= Catholic Bible =

Catholic Church canon of Bible books

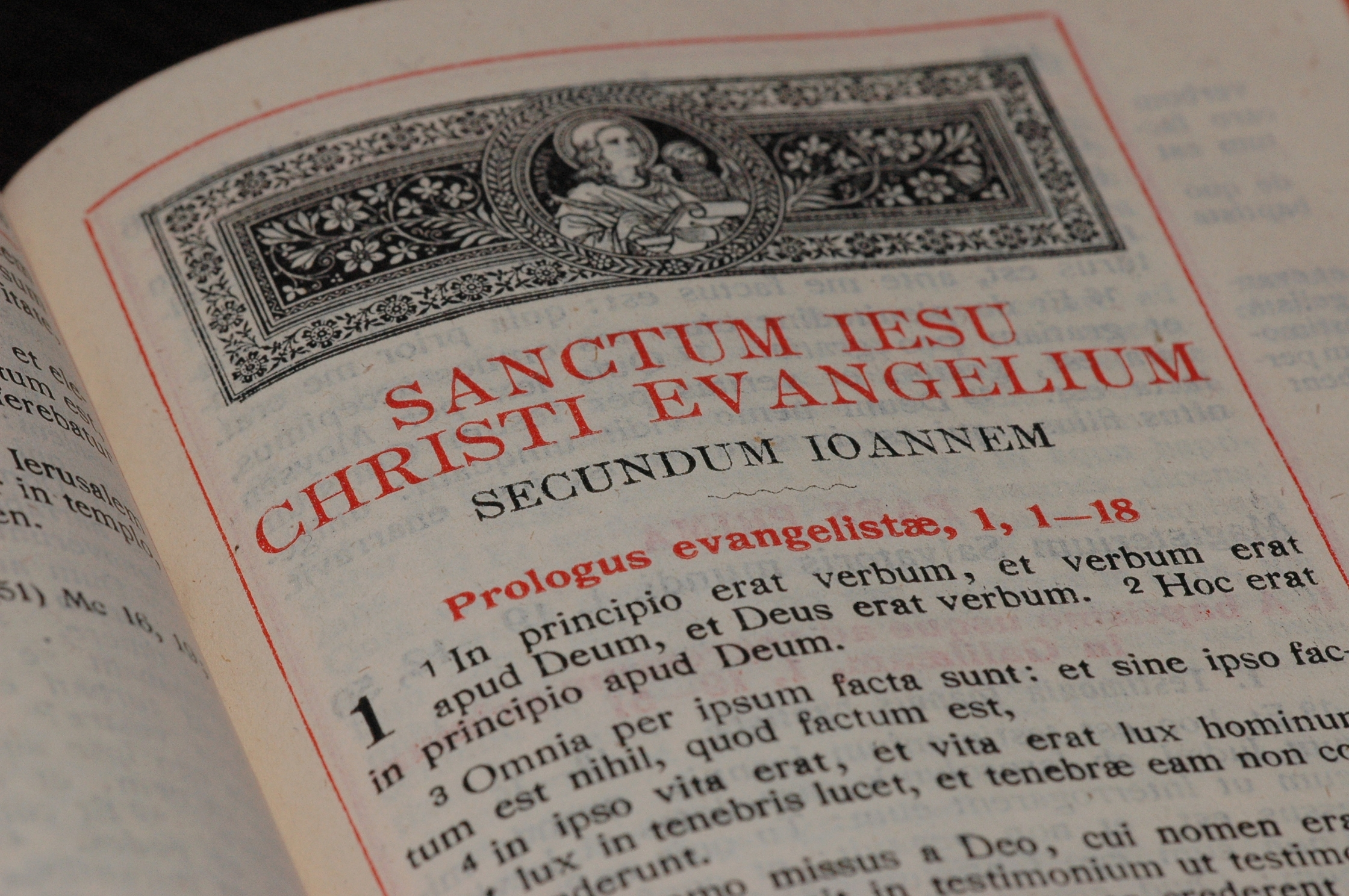
The prologue of the Gospel of John, Sixto-Clementine Vulgate, 1922 edition

The Catholic Bible is the Christian Bible intended for use in Catholic liturgy, whose revision, translation or version was produced by Catholics and reflects a Catholic understanding of scripture, in accordance with the prescriptions of Catholic canon law, and is often approved by the Catholic Church. More generally, it can refer to editions of the Christian Bible that includes the 73-book canon recognized by the Catholic Church. (Note: There are 76 to 79 books recognized by the Eastern Orthodox Churches, 81 by the Ethiopian Church, and 66 are recognized by most Protestant Churches.) Both the Catholic and Eastern Orthodox canons include some of the deuterocanonical books (and parts of books) of the Old Testament which are in the Greek Septuagint, but are absent from the Hebrew Masoretic Text.

According to the Decretum Gelasianum (a work written by an anonymous scholar between AD 519 and 553), Catholic Church officials cited a list of books of scripture presented as having been made canonical at the Council of Rome (382). Later, the Catholic Church formally affirmed its canon of scripture with the Synod of Hippo (393), followed by a Council of Carthage (397), another Council of Carthage (419), the Council of Florence (1431–1449), and the Council of Trent (1545–1563). The canon consists of 46 books in the Old Testament and 27 books in the New Testament, for a total of 73 books in the Catholic Bible.

== Books included ==
The Catholic Bible is composed of 73 books: an Old Testament of 46 books (including seven deuterocanonical books and additional deuterocanonical content in two books) and a New Testament of 27 books.

=== Old Testament (46 books) ===
The seven deuterocanonical books are indicated by an asterisk (*) and the two books with additional deuterocanonical material by a plus sign (+).

- Pentateuch (5): Genesis, Exodus, Leviticus, Numbers, Deuteronomy
- Historical books (16): Joshua, Judges, Ruth, 1 Samuel, 2 Samuel, 1 Kings, 2 Kings, 1 Chronicles, 2 Chronicles, Ezra, Nehemiah, Tobit (*), Judith (*), Esther (+), 1 Maccabees (*), 2 Maccabees (*)
- Poetic Books (7): Job, Psalms, Proverbs, Ecclesiastes, Song of Songs, Wisdom of Solomon (*), Sirach (*)
- Prophetic books (18): Isaiah, Jeremiah, Lamentations, Baruch (*), Ezekiel, Daniel (+), Hosea, Joel, Amos, Obadiah, Jonah, Micah, Nahum, Habakkuk, Zephaniah, Haggai, Zechariah, Malachi

The Sixto-Clementine Vulgate and the original Douay–Rheims Bible also included in an appendix three books whose canonicity was questioned: 1 Esdras, 2 Esdras, and Prayer of Manasseh.

=== New Testament (27 books) ===
- The Gospels (4): Matthew, Mark, Luke, John
- Historical book (1): Acts of the Apostles
- Pauline epistles (13): Romans, 1 Corinthians, 2 Corinthians, Galatians, Ephesians, Philippians, Colossians, 1 Thessalonians, 2 Thessalonians, 1 Timothy, 2 Timothy, Titus, Philemon
- Hebrews (1)
- General epistles (7): James, 1 Peter, 2 Peter, 1 John, 2 John, 3 John, Jude
- Prophetic book (1): Apocalypse of John

== Canon law ==
The term "Catholic Bible" also refers to an edition of the Bible published in accordance with the prescriptions of Catholic canon law, which states:

Books of the sacred scriptures cannot be published unless the Apostolic See or the conference of bishops has approved them. For the publication of their translations into the vernacular, it is also required that they be approved by the same authority and provided with necessary and sufficient annotations. With the permission of the Conference of Bishops, Catholic members of the Christian faithful in collaboration with separated brothers and sisters can prepare and publish translations of the sacred scriptures provided with appropriate annotations.

— Canon 825 of the 1983 Code of Canon Law

== Principles of translation ==
Without diminishing the authority of the texts of the books of Scripture in the original languages, the Council of Trent declared the Vulgate the official translation of the Bible for the Latin Church, but did not forbid the making of translations directly from the original languages. Ronald Knox, the author of what has been called the Knox Bible, a formal equivalence mode bible, wrote: "When I talk about translating the Bible, I mean translating the Vulgate." Today, the version of the Bible that is used in official documents in Latin is the Nova Vulgata, a revision of the Vulgate.

The original Bible text is, according to Catholics, "written by the inspired author himself and has more authority and greater weight than any, even the very best, translation whether ancient or modern".

The principles expounded in Pope Pius XII's encyclical Divino afflante Spiritu regarding exegesis or interpretation, as in commentaries on the Bible, apply also to the preparation of a translation. These include the need for familiarity with the original languages and other cognate languages, the study of ancient codices and even papyrus fragments of the text and the application to them of textual criticism, "to insure that the sacred text be restored as perfectly as possible, be purified from the corruptions due to the carelessness of the copyists and be freed, as far as may be done, from glosses and omissions, from the interchange and repetition of words and from all other kinds of mistakes, which are wont to make their way gradually into writings handed down through many centuries".

The Catholic Bible, therefore, contains a translation of scripture that valid Church authorities have found to be in conformity with Catholic teaching and have also approved for use by Catholics for personal prayer and study or, in some cases, also in liturgy. This approval is typically indicated by the presence of an imprimatur. However, in the interest of collaborating with other Christian traditions in joint translation projects, the Dicastery for Promoting Christian Unity states:

In some circumstances, it may be wise to consider a preface including a joint recommendation by ecclesiastical authorities instead of a formal nihil obstat and imprimatur.

— Guidelines for Interconfessional Cooperation in Translating the Bible, section 2.8

== Catholic English versions ==
The following are English versions of the Bible that correspond to the description above and canon law:

Abbreviation	Name	Date
DRB	Douay–Rheims Bible	1582, 1609, 1610 (Note: The New Testament was published in 1582, the Old Testament in two volumes, one in 1609, the other in 1610. The Old Testament was followed by three Apocrypha books which are in the appendix of the Clementine Vulgate; Prayer of Manasseh, 3 Esdras, and 4 Esdras.)
DRB	Douay–Rheims Bible Challoner Revision	1749–1752
CB	Confraternity Bible	1941 (Note: NT released in 1941. The OT contained material from the Challoner Revision until the entire OT was completed in 1969. This Old Testament became the basis for the 1970 NAB)
Knox	Knox Bible	1950
KLNT	Kleist–Lilly New Testament	1956 (Note: New Testament only; Gospels by James Kleist, rest by Joseph Lilly.)
RSV–CE	Revised Standard Version Catholic Edition	1966
JB	Jerusalem Bible	1966
NEB	New English Bible	1970
NAB	New American Bible	1970
TLB–CE	The Living Bible Catholic Edition	1971
NJB	New Jerusalem Bible	1985
CCB	Christian Community Bible	1988
REB	Revised English Bible	1989
NRSV–CE	New Revised Standard Version Catholic Edition	1993
GNT–CE	Good News Translation Catholic Edition (Note: Formerly known as the Today's English Version)	1993
RSV–2CE	Revised Standard Version, Second Catholic Edition	2006
CTS–NCB	CTS New Catholic Bible	2007 (Note: The Jerusalem Bible except for the Book of Psalms, which is replaced by the Grail Psalms, and with the word "Yahweh" altered to "the Lord", as directed by the Congregation for Divine Worship and the Discipline of the Sacraments for Bibles intended to be used in the liturgy.)
NABRE	New American Bible Revised Edition	2011/1986 (OT/NT)
NLT-CE	New Living Translation Catholic Edition	2015
ESV-CE	English Standard Version Catholic Edition	2017
NCB	New Catholic Bible (St. Joseph New Catholic Bible) (Note: Approved by the Catholic Bishops' Conference of the Philippines)	2019
RNJB	Revised New Jerusalem Bible	2019

In 2013, The Message - Catholic / Ecumenical Edition was also published, with the deuterocanonical books translated by a Catholic scholar, William Griffin.

In 2017, the Good News Translation (GNT)—commonly known as the Good News Bible (GNB)—released a new Catholic Edition in the UK, primarily published by the British & Foreign Bible Society.

== Languages with a Catholic translation of the Bible ==
Precise details of how many languages a full Catholic version of the Bible has been translated into that correspond to the description above and canon law are hard to establish but by 2025 the Global Bible Catalogue contained over 1200 entries in 191 languages for Bibles that included deuterocanonical books.

Recent translations include a translation in both official written languages of Norway, Bokmål and Nynorsk, and Kibeembe in the Republic of Congo, both published in 2024.

== Differences from Catholic lectionaries ==
Lectionaries for use in the liturgy differ somewhat in text from the Bible versions on which they are based. Many liturgies, including the Roman, omit some verses in the biblical readings that they use.

Another difference concerns the usage of the Tetragrammaton. Yahweh appears in some Bible translations such as the Jerusalem Bible (1966) throughout the Old Testament. Long-standing Jewish and Christian tradition holds that the name is not to be spoken in worship or printed in liturgical texts out of reverence. A 2008 letter from the Congregation for Divine Worship and the Discipline of the Sacraments explicitly forbids the use of the name in worship texts, stating: "For the translation of the biblical text in modern languages, intended for the liturgical usage of the Church, what is already prescribed by n. 41 of the Instruction Liturgiam authenticam is to be followed; that is, the divine tetragrammaton is to be rendered by the equivalent of Adonai/Kyrios; Lord, Signore, Seigneur, Herr, Señor, etc."

Currently, there is only one lectionary reported to be in use corresponding exactly to an in-print Catholic Bible translation: the Ignatius Press lectionary based on the Revised Standard Version, Second Catholic (or Ignatius) Edition (RSV-2CE) approved for liturgical use in the Antilles and by former Anglicans in the personal ordinariates.

In 2007 the Catholic Truth Society published the "CTS New Catholic Bible", consisting of the original 1966 Jerusalem Bible text revised to match its use in lectionaries throughout most English-speaking countries, in conformity with the directives of the Congregation for Divine Worship and the Discipline of the Sacraments and the Pontifical Biblical Commission.

In 2012, the United States Conference of Catholic Bishops "announced a plan to revise the New Testament of the New American Bible Revised Edition so a single version can be used for individual prayer, catechesis and liturgy" in the United States. After developing a plan and budget for the revision project, work began in 2013 with the creation of an editorial board made up of five people from the Catholic Biblical Association (CBA). The revision is now underway and, after the necessary approvals from the bishops and the Vatican, is expected to be done around the year 2025.

== Differences from other editions of the Christian Bible ==
The contents page for the 80‑book Bible in the King James Version, listing "The Books of the Old Testament", "The Books called Apocrypha", and "The Books of the New Testament"

The Catholic edition of the Bible differs in the number and order of books from those typically found in the Protestant edition of the Bible, as Catholic editions retain in their canon seven books that are regarded as non-canonical in Protestantism. (Note: Though Protestantism regards them as non-canonical, many Protestant editions traditionally include these books and others as an intertestamental section known as the Apocrypha, totaling 80 books, e.g. the King James Version with Apocrypha.) As such, its canon of Old Testament texts is somewhat larger than that in editions used by Protestants, which are typically based exclusively on the shorter Hebrew and Aramaic Masoretic Text.

On the other hand, its canon, which does not accept all the books that are included in the Septuagint, is shorter than that of some churches of Eastern and Oriental Orthodoxy, which recognize other books as sacred scripture. According to the Greek Orthodox Church, "The translation of the Seventy [the Septuagint] was for the Church the Apostolic Bible, to which both the Lord and His disciples refer. [...] It enjoys divine authority and prestige as the Bible of the indivisible Church of the first eight centuries. It constitutes the Old Testament, the official text of our Orthodox Church and remains the authentic text by which the official translations of the Old Testament of the other sister Orthodox Churches were made; it was the divine instrument of pre-Christ evangelism and was the basis of Orthodox Theology." The Greek Orthodox Church generally considers Psalm 151 to be part of the Book of Psalms, the Prayer of Manasseh as the final chapter of 2 Chronicles, and accepts the "books of the Maccabees" as four in number, but generally places 4 Maccabees in an appendix. (Note: There are differences from Western usage in the naming of some books (see, for instance, Esdras#Naming conventions).)

The Bible of the Tewahedo Churches differs from the Western and Greek Orthodox Bibles in the order, naming, and chapter/verse division of some of the books. The Ethiopian "narrow" biblical canon includes 81 books altogether: The 27 books of the New Testament; the Old Testament books found in the Septuagint and that are accepted by the Eastern Orthodox (more numerous than the Catholic deuterocanonical books); (Note: See Deuterocanonical books#In Eastern Orthodoxy) and in addition Enoch, Jubilees, 1 Esdras, 2 Esdras, Rest of the Words of Baruch and 3 books of Meqabyan. A "broader" Ethiopian New Testament canon includes 4 books of "Sinodos" (church practices), 2 "Books of Covenant", "Ethiopic Clement", and "Ethiopic Didascalia" (Apostolic Church-Ordinances). This "broader" canon is sometimes said to include with the Old Testament an 8-part history of the Jews based on the writings of Titus Flavius Josephus, and known as "Pseudo-Josephus" or "Joseph ben Gurion" (Yosēf walda Koryon).

== See also ==
- Biblical canon
- Chapters and verses of the Bible
- Christian biblical canons
- Congregation for the Doctrine of the Faith
- Council of Trent
- Dei verbum
- Divino afflante Spiritu
- Dynamic and formal equivalence
- Encyclopaedia Biblica
- International Commission on English in the Liturgy
- Liturgiam authenticam
- Pontifical Biblical Commission
- Protestant Bible
- Second Vatican Council
