= New American Bible Revised Edition =

English translation of the Bible

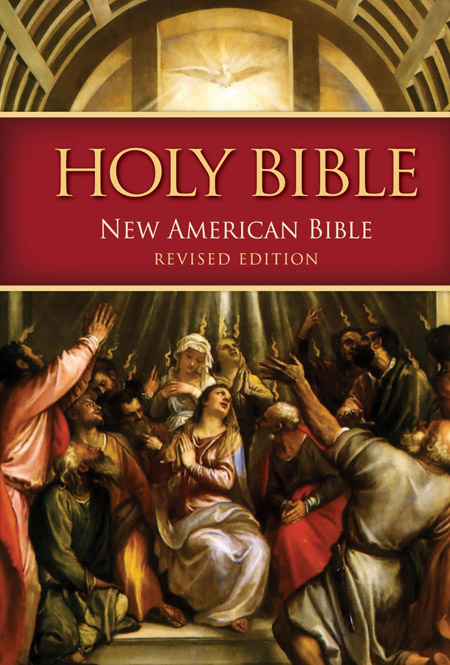
- Full name: New American Bible Revised Edition
- Abbreviation: NABRE
- Complete Bible published: March 9, 2011
- Derived from: Confraternity Bible, New American Bible
- Textual basis: OT (2011 revision): Masoretic Text with Dead Sea Scrolls and minor Septuagint influence.; Deuterocanonicals: Septuagint and Dead Sea Scrolls.; NT: (1986 revision): UBS Greek New Testament (3rd ed.), consultations of Novum Testamentum Graece (26th ed.)
- Translation type: Formal equivalence (from the Preface), moderate use of dynamic equivalence.
- Reading level: High School
- Copyright: Confraternity of Christian Doctrine
- Webpage: bible.usccb.org/bible
- Genesis 1:1–3 In the beginning, when God created the heavens and the earth—and the earth was without form or shape, with darkness over the abyss and a mighty wind sweeping over the waters— Then God said: Let there be light, and there was light. John 3:16 For God so loved the world that he gave his only Son, so that everyone who believes in him might not perish but might have eternal life.

The New American Bible Revised Edition (NABRE) is an English-language Catholic translation of the Bible, the first major update in 20 years to the New American Bible (NAB), which was translated by members of the Catholic Biblical Association and originally published in 1970. Released on March 9, 2011, the NABRE consists of the 1986 revision of the NAB New Testament with a fully revised Old Testament approved by the United States Conference of Catholic Bishops in 2010.

The NABRE is approved for Catholic personal use. Although the revised Lectionary based on the original New American Bible is still the sole translation approved for use at Mass in the dioceses of the United States, the NABRE New Testament is currently being revised so that American Catholics can read the same Bible translation in personal study and devotion that they hear in Mass.

== Background ==
The first edition of the New American Bible was published in 1970. The New Testament had been updated in 1986, and the Psalms in 1991, but the rest of the Old Testament had not been revised. In August 1990, the Catholic Biblical Association passed a resolution urging revision of the remainder of the Old Testament.

In a press statement, the USCCB cited three reasons for the necessity of revising the Old Testament. The new translation:

1. Aims to utilize modern scholastic advances in biblical study and adapt to changes in linguistics in order to render a more accurate translation in contemporary English.
2. Takes advantage of recently discovered ancient manuscripts like the Dead Sea Scrolls which provide better access to the historical textual tradition.
3. Uses the best manuscript-translating traditions available in order to translate more literally and accurately than previous translations.

The press statement said that the New American Bible Revised Edition would in many ways be a more literal translation than the original New American Bible.

== Translation history ==
This revision was begun in 1994 by scholars of the Catholic Biblical Association, and was completed in 2002. The translators used the Masoretic Text as their primary textual basis, with occasional corrections from the Septuagint or Dead Sea Scrolls. The bishops reviewed these translations, and sent them back to the scholars for revisions. The revisions were completed in 2008, and were approved by the USCCB at their November 2008 meeting. However, they would not allow it to be published with the 1991 translation of the Psalms. They decided to delay publication of the Old Testament until a revision of the Psalms, already in progress, could be completed.

=== Psalms ===
The 1991 NAB Psalter had initially been approved for liturgical use by the Vatican in 1992, but this approval was revoked in 1994, after changes to the policy regarding inclusive language. In April 2002, Father Joseph Jensen, one of the leading translators of that Psalter, announced a plan to revise it. This revision was completed in June 2003. Following further revisions, this new Psalter was approved by the USCCB in 2010.

== Changes to the Old Testament ==
=== Vocabulary ===
One of the more important changes found in the New American Bible Revised Edition is the substitution of various words and phrases for language which carries a modern connotation which is quite different from the original suggested meanings. Examples include changing "cereal" to "grain" and "booty" to "plunder."

Similarly, "holocaust" has been changed to "burnt offering". The word "holocaust" in modern English has become used almost exclusively to refer to the genocide of the Jewish people during World War II. In order to capture the biblical meaning, the translators chose the phrase "burnt offering" to replace "holocaust" throughout the text in reference to sacrifices made to God.

=== Gender-neutral language ===
Vatican norms for translation of the Bible direct that "[t]he translation of scripture should faithfully reflect the Word of God in the original human languages, without 'correction' or 'improvement' in service of modern sensitivities". The NABRE tried to use inclusive language while still following the Vatican's guidelines for translation. However, accuracy was a greater concern than inclusivity. Robert Miller II, who helped translate the Psalms, said that while there was not as much inclusive language in the new translation, this did not come from an attempt to "backtrack on the use of inclusive language" but rather "to use language as close as possible to the Hebrew." While the NABRE does use some horizontal inclusive language (referring to people), it does not contain vertical inclusive language (referring to God), which is prohibited by the USCCB.

== Sample changes ==
New American Bible	New American Bible Revised Edition
Leviticus 2:1 "When anyone wishes to bring a cereal offering to the LORD, his offering must consist of fine flour."	Leviticus 2:1 "When anyone brings a grain offering to the LORD, the offering must consist of bran flour."
Isaiah 49:24 "Thus says the LORD: Can booty be taken from a warrior?"	Isaiah 49:24 "Can plunder be taken from a warrior [?]"
Joel 3:1-5 Then afterward I will pour out my spirit upon all mankind. Your sons and daughters shall prophesy, your old men shall dream dreams, your young men shall see visions; Even upon the servants and the handmaids, in those days, I will pour out my spirit. And I will work wonders in the heavens and on the earth, blood, fire, and columns of smoke; The sun will be turned to darkness, and the moon to blood, At the coming of the Day of the LORD, the great and terrible day. Then everyone shall be rescued who calls on the name of the LORD; For on Mount Zion there shall be a remnant, as the LORD has said, And in Jerusalem survivors whom the LORD shall call.	Joel 3:1-5 It shall come to pass I will pour out my spirit upon all flesh. Your sons and daughters will prophesy, your old men will dream dreams, your young men will see visions. Even upon your male and female servants, in those days, I will pour out my spirit. I will set signs in the heavens and on the earth, blood, fire, and columns of smoke; The sun will darken, the moon turn blood-red. Before the day of the LORD arrives, that great and terrible day. Then everyone who calls upon the name of the LORD will escape harm. For on Mount Zion there will be a remnant, as the LORD has said, And in Jerusalem survivors whom the LORD will summon.
Sirach 51:1-4a I give you thanks, O God of my father; I praise you, O God my savior! I will make known your name, refuge of my life; you have been my helper against my adversaries. You have saved me from death, and kept back my body from the pit, From the clutches of the nether world you have snatched my feet; you have delivered me, in your great mercy From the scourge of a slanderous tongue, and from lips that went over to falsehood; From the snare of those who watched for my downfall, and from the power of those who sought my life; From many a danger you have saved me, from flames that hemmed me in on every side.	Sirach 51: 1-4a I give you thanks, Lord and King, I praise you, God my savior! I declare your name, refuge of my life, because you have ransomed my life from death; You held back my body from the pit, and delivered my foot from the power of Sheol. You have preserved me from the scourge of the slanderous tongue, and from the lips of those who went over to falsehood. You were with me against those who rise up against me; You have rescued me according to your abundant mercy From the snare of those who look for my downfall, and from the power of those who seek my life. From many dangers you have saved me, from flames that beset me on every side.

== Completion and use ==
While the NABRE represents a revision of the NAB towards conformity towards Liturgiam Authenticam, there have not been any announced plans to use the NABRE for the lectionary in the United States. The USCCB announced the approval is for "private use and study" while Masses will continue to use a lectionary taken from "an earlier, modified version of the NAB translation."

The release garnered widespread press coverage by national news sources such as NPR and USA Today.

== Future editions ==
In 2012, the USCCB "announced a plan to revise the New Testament of the New American Bible Revised Edition so a single version can be used for individual prayer, catechesis and liturgy." After they developed a plan and budget for the revision project, work began in 2013 with the creation of an editorial board made up of five people from the Catholic Biblical Association (CBA). On November 11, 2025, it was announced that the revised translation would be published on Ash Wednesday, February 10, 2027, with a new name, the Catholic American Bible (CAB).

== See also ==
- Catholic Bible
- Douay–Rheims Bible
- Confraternity Bible
- Divino afflante Spiritu
- International Commission on English in the Liturgy
