= Pope Francis bibliography =

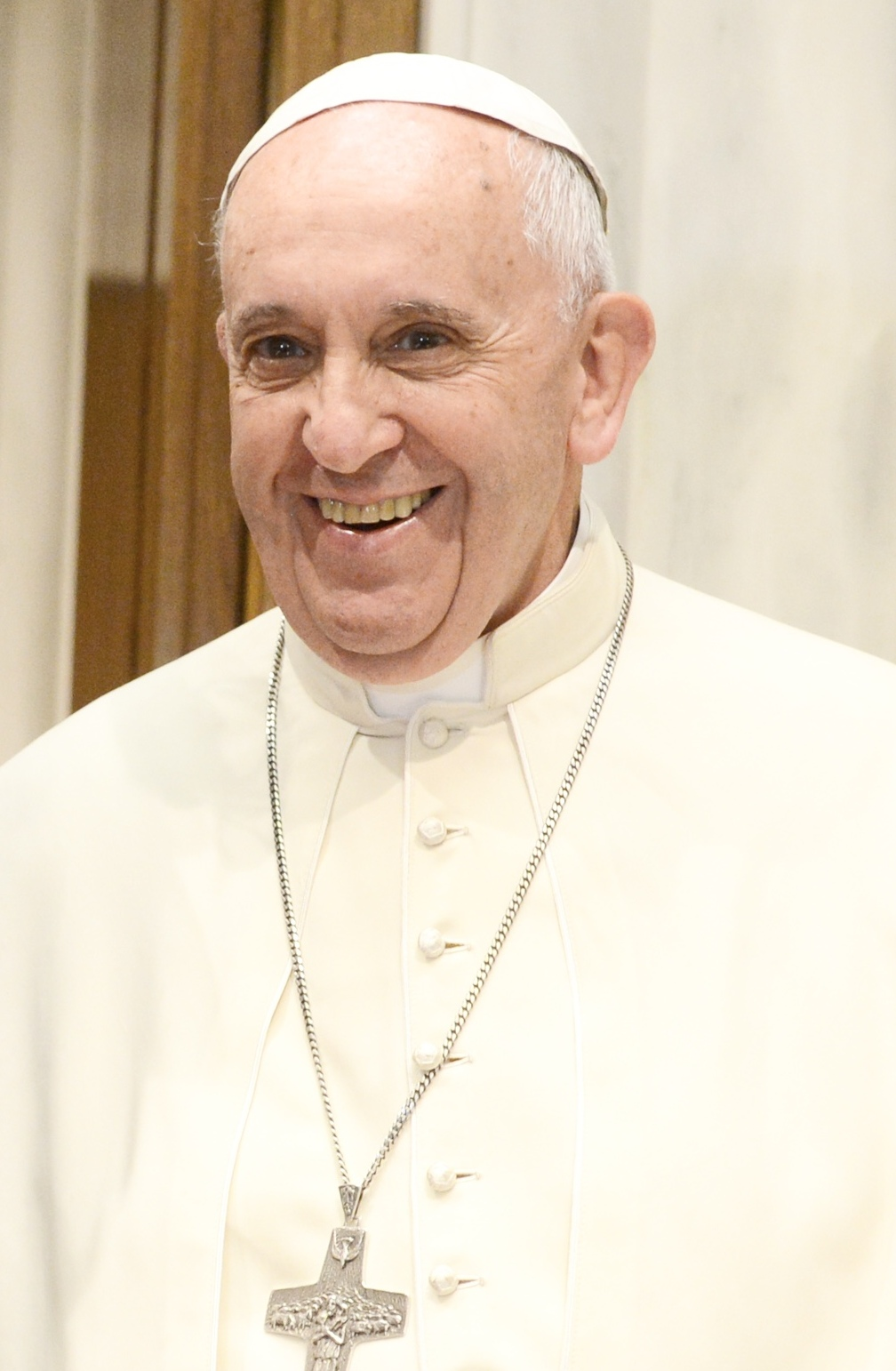

Pope Francis's bibliography included several books, apostolic letters, constitutions, encyclicals, exhortations, and one bull, as well as several writings from before his papacy, where he was credited as Jorge Mario Bergoglio. His collected works can be viewed on the official website of the Holy See, which also contains his speeches, homilies, and other messages.

== Apostolic Letters ==
=== Issued motu proprio ===
- Sanctuarium in ecclesia (February 11, 2017) Text
- Maiorem hac dilectionem (July 11, 2017) Text
- Magnum principium (September 3, 2017) Text
- Summa familiae cura (September 8, 2017) Text
- Imparare a congedarsi (February 12, 2018) Text
- Law on the Government of Vatican City State (November 25, 2018) Text (IT)
- On the Pontifical Commission Ecclesia Dei (January 17, 2019) Text
- New statue of the auditor general (January 21, 2019) Text (IT)
- Communis vita (March 19, 2019) Text
- On the protection of minors and vulnerable persons (March 26, 2019) Text
- Vos estis lux mundi (May 7, 2019) Text
- Aperuit Illis (September 30, 2019) Text
- For the change of name of the Vatican Secret Archive to the Vatican Apostolic Archive (October 22, 2019) Text
- Regarding the office of dean of the college of cardinals (December 21, 2019) Text
- Law No. CCCLI on the Vatican City State Judicial System (March 16, 2020) Text (IT)
- On transparency, control and competition in the procedures for awarding public contracts of the Holy See and Vatican City State (May 19, 2020) Text
- Authenticum charismatis (November 1, 2020) Text
- Ab inito (November 21, 2020) Text
- Regarding certain competencies in economic and financial matters (December 26, 2020) Text
- Spiritus Domini (January 10, 2021) Text
- On amendments in matter of justice (February 8, 2021) Text
- Regarding the containment of expenditures for employees of the Holy See, the Governorate of Vatican City State, and other connected Entities (March 23, 2021) Text
- Regarding provisions on transparency in the management of public finances (April 26, 2021) Text
- Amending the jurisdiction of the judicial bodies of Vatican City State (April 30, 2021) Text
- Antiquum ministerium (May 10, 2021) Text
- Traditionis custodes (July 16, 2021) Text
- Fratello sole (June 28, 2024) Text

=== Other ===
- Misericordia et misera (November 20, 2016) Text
- Admirabile signum (December 1, 2019) Text
- Scripturae Sacrae affectus (September 30, 2020) Text
- Patris Corde (December 8, 2020) Text
- Cando lucis aeternae (March 25, 2021) Text

== Books ==
- Bergoglio, Jorge (1982). Meditaciones para religiosos [Meditations for the Religious] (in Spanish). Buenos Aires: Diego de Torres. OCLC 644781822.
- Bergoglio, Jorge (1992). Reflexiones en esperanza [Reflections of Hope] (in Spanish). Buenos Aires: Ediciones Universidad del Salvador. OCLC 36380521.
- Bergoglio, Jorge (2003). Educar: exigencia y pasión: desafíos para educadores cristianos [To Educate: Exactingness and Passion: Challenges for Christian Educators] (in Spanish). Buenos Aires: Editorial Claretiana. ISBN 9789505124572.
- Bergoglio, Jorge (2003). Ponerse la patria al hombro: memoria y camino de esperanza [Putting the Motherland on One's Shoulders: Memoir and Path of Hope] (in Spanish). Buenos Aires: Editorial Claretiana. ISBN 9789505125111.
- Bergoglio, Jorge (2005). La nación por construir: utopía, pensamiento y compromiso: VIII Jornada de Pastoral Social [The Nation to Be Built: Utopia, Thought, and Commitment] (in Spanish). Buenos Aires: Editorial Claretiana. ISBN 9789505125463.
- Bergoglio, Jorge (2006). Corrupción y pecado: algunas reflexiones en torno al tema de la corrupción [Corruption and Sin: Some Thoughts on Corruption] (in Spanish). Buenos Aires: Editorial Claretiana. ISBN 9789505125722.
- Bergoglio, Jorge (2006). Sobre la acusación de sí mismo [On Self-Accusation, (or from the Italian, Humility: The Road towards God)] (in Spanish). Buenos Aires: Editorial Claretiana. ISBN 978-950-512-549-4.
- Bergoglio, Jorge (2007). El verdadero poder es el servicio [True Power Is Service] (in Spanish). Buenos Aires: Editorial Claretiana. OCLC 688511686.
- Bergoglio, Jorge (2009). Seminario: las deudas sociales de nuestro tiempo: la deuda social según la doctrina de la iglesia [Seminar: the Social Debts of Our Time: Social Debt According to Church Doctrine] (in Spanish). Buenos Aires: EPOCA-USAL. ISBN 9788493741235.
- Bergoglio, Jorge; Skorka, Abraham (2010). Sobre el cielo y la tierra [On Heaven and Earth] (in Spanish). Buenos Aires: Editorial Sudamericana. ISBN 9789500732932.; Bergoglio, Jorge; Skorka, Abraham (2013). On Heaven and Earth: Pope Francis on Faith, Family, and the Church in the Twenty-First Century. New York: Random House. ISBN 978-0-7704-3506-6.
- Bergoglio, Jorge (2010). Seminario Internacional: consenso para el desarrollo: reflexiones sobre solidaridad y desarrollo [International seminar: Consensus about Development: Reflexions on Solidarity and development] (in Spanish). Buenos Aires: EPOCA. ISBN 9789875073524.
- Bergoglio, Jorge (2011). Nosotros como ciudadanos, nosotros como pueblo: hacia un bicentenario en justicia y solidaridad [Ourselves as Citizens, Ourselves as a People: towards a Bicentenary in Justice and Solidarity] (in Spanish). Buenos Aires: Editorial Claretiana. ISBN 9789505127443.
- Pope Francis (2013). Open Mind, Faithful Heart: Reflections On Following Jesus. Translated by Joseph V. Owens, SJ. New York: Crossroad Publishing Company. ISBN 978-0-8245-1997-1.
- Bergoglio, Jorge (1995). La vida sagrada y su misión en la Iglesia y en el mundo (PDF) (in Spanish). Argentina Catholic University: Faculty of Theology. OCLC 806712655.
- Egan, Edward Michael; Bergoglio, Jorge (2001). Episcopus minister Evangelii Iesu Christi propter spem mundi: relatio post disceptationem. The Catholic Church. The Synod of Bishops. Ordinary General Assembly. E Civitate Vaticana. OCLC 749998123.
- Bergoglio, Jorge (2003). "For Man". In Buzzi, Elisa (ed.). A Generative Thought: An Introduction to the Works of Luigi Giussani. Montreal: McGill-Queen's University Press. pp. 79–83. ISBN 978-0-7735-2612-9.
- John Paul, Pope; Castro, Fidel (2004). Bergoglio, Jorge (ed.). Diálogos entre Juan Pablo II y Fidel Castro [Dialogues Between John Paul II and Fidel Castro] (in Spanish). Buenos Aires: Ciudad Argentina. ISBN 9789875070745.
- Bergoglio, Jorge (2007). "Buscar el camino hacia el futuro, llevando consigo la memoria de las raíces". Humanitas (in Spanish) (47). National Humanities Institute: 468–483. OCLC 176911626.
- Castiñeira de Dios, José María (2007). El santito Ceferino Namuncurá: relato en verso (in Spanish). Foreword by Jorge Bergoglio. Buenos Aires: Lumen. ISBN 9789870007340.
- Spadaro, Antonio (2013). A Big Heart Open to God: A Conversation with Pope Francis. New York: HarperOne. ISBN 978-0-06-233377-3.
- Official Vatican transcript in English of IEC Catechesis The Eucharist: Gift from God for the life of the world (2008) (originally given in Spanish), 49th International Eucharistic Congress, Quebec, Canada
- Agencia Informativa Católica Argentina (1999–2012). Documentos de los obispos: Homilías y documentos del cardenal Bergoglio (in Spanish)
- Life: My Story Through History (2024)
- Hope: The Autobiography (2025)

== Bulls ==
- Misericordiae Vultus (April 11, 2015) Text

== Constitutions ==
- Quo firmiores (1 May 2013) Latin text
- Quo aptius spirituali (23 December 2013) Latin text
- Patrimonium Ecclesiarum (23 December 2013) Latin text
- Cum ad aeternam (28 December 2013) Latin text
- Attenta deliberatione (12 May 2014) Latin text
- Quo aptius (12 May 2014) Latin text
- Christi voluntate (9 June 2014) Latin text
- Ad totius dominici gregis (25 June 2014) Latin text
- Undecim abhinc annos (11 July 2014) Latin text
- Contemplationi faventes (23 October 2014) Latin text
- Inter eximias (6 November 2014) Latin text
- Cum ad provehendam (22 December 2014) Latin text
- Multum fructum (19 January 2015) Latin text
- Quae maiori (19 January 2015) Latin text
- Vultum Dei quaerere (29 June 2016) English text
- Veritatis gaudium (8 December 2017) English text
- Episcopalis communio (15 September 2018) English text
- Pascite gregem Dei (23 May 2021) English text
- Praedicate evangelium (19 March 2022) English text
- In Ecclesiarum Communione (6 January 2023) Italian text

== Encyclicals ==
- Lumen fidei (June 29, 2013) Text
- Laudato si' (June 18, 2015) Text
- Fratelli tutti (October 3, 2020) Text
- Dilexit nos (October 24, 2024) Text

== Exhortations ==
- Evangelii gaudium (November 24, 2013) Text
- Amoris laetitia (March 19, 2016) Text
- Gaudete et exsultate (March 19, 2018) Text
- Christus vivit (March 25, 2019) Text
- Querida Amazonia (February 2, 2020) Text
- Laudate Deum (October 4, 2023) Text
- C'est la confiance (October 15, 2023) Text
