= Propitiation =

Appeasing or making well-disposed a deity

Propitiation is the act of appeasing or making well-disposed a deity, thus incurring divine favor or avoiding divine retribution. It is related to the idea of atonement and sometimes mistakenly conflated with expiation. The discussion here encompasses usage only in the Christian tradition.

== Christian theology ==
In Romans 3:25 the King James Version, New King James Version, New American Standard Bible, and the English Standard Version translates "propitiation" from the Greek word hilasterion. Concretely it specifically means the lid of The Ark of The Covenant. The only other occurrence of hilasterion in the NT is in Hebrews 9:5, where it is translated as "mercy seat" in all of the Bible translations named above as well as the Revised Standard Version and the New Revised Standard Version.

For many Christians it has the meaning of "that which expiates or propitiates" or "the gift which procures propitiation". 1 John 2:2 (KJV) reads: "And he is the propitiation for our sins: and not for ours only, but also for the sins of the whole world." There is frequent similar use of hilasterion in the Septuagint, Exodus 25:17–22 ff. The mercy seat was sprinkled with blood on Yom Kippur (Leviticus 16:14), representing that the righteous sentence of the Law had been executed, changing a judgment seat into a mercy seat (Hebrews 9:11–15; compare with "throne of grace" in Hebrews 4:14–16; place of communion, (Exodus 25:21–22).

Another Greek word, hilasmos, is used for Christ as our propitiation in 1 John 2:2; 4:10; and in the Septuagint (Leviticus 25:9; Numbers 5:8; Amos 8:14). The thought in the OT sacrifices and in the NT fulfillment, is that Christ completely satisfied the just demands of the Holy Father for judgment on sin, by his death at Calvary (Hebrews 7:26–28). TDNT, however, takes a different view of Hebrews: "If the author uses the ritual as a means to portray Christ's work, he also finds that in the new covenant the literal offerings of the ritual are replaced by the obedience of Christ (10:5ff.; cf. Ps. 40) and the Christian ministry of praise and mutual service (13:15-16; cf. Ps. 50). In other words, total self-giving, first that of Christ, and then, on this basis, that of his people, is the true meaning of sacrifice.

God, in view of the cross, is declared righteous in having been able to justify sins in the OT period, as well as in being able to forgive sinners under the New Covenant (Romans 3:25,26; cf. Exodus 29:33, note).

Writing in Harper's Bible Dictionary (1952), Methodist theologian Edwin Lewis summarizes Paul's teaching in Romans 3 that God's attitude toward sin is revealed "through the redemption that is in Christ Jesus" (Rom. 3:23-26). "The nature of sin must be set forth through the very means through which reconciliation is to be brought about: this means the sacrificial death of Jesus Christ, which is therefore 'a propitiation' (v. 25 KJV). ... God's righteousness, which makes sin a barrier to fellowship, and God's love, which would destroy the barrier, are revealed and satisfied in one and the same means, the gift of Christ to be the Mediator between Himself and men."

== Propitiation and expiation ==
=== Book of Common Prayer ===
The Church of England's Book of Common Prayer (1662), following the prayer of confession before reception of Holy Communion, the priest is to offer "comfortable words" which consist of a series of four verses from the New Testament. The final text is from 1 John 2:1-2 (KJV): "If any man sin, we have an Advocate with the Father, Jesus Christ the righteous; and he is the propitiation for our sins." The same text was used in the American editions of 1789 and 1928. However, in the Episcopal Church's 1979 Book of Common Prayer, in the Rite One form, "propitiation" was changed to read "perfect offering," and with the rest of verse 2 added: "and not for ours only, but for the sins of the whole world."

=== Reformation theology ===
The case for translating hilasterion as "expiation" instead of "propitiation" was put forward by British scholar C. H. Dodd in 1935 and at first gained wide support. Scottish scholars Francis Davidson and G.T. Thompson, writing in The New Bible Commentary, first published in 1953, state that "The idea is not that of conciliation of an angry God by sinful humanity, but of expiation of sin by a merciful God through the atoning death of His Son. It does not necessarily exclude, however, the reality of righteous wrath because of sin." The Anglican theologian and biblical scholar Austin Farrer, writing a quarter century after Dodd, argued that Paul's words in Romans 3 should be translated in terms of expiation rather than propitiation: "God himself, says St Paul, so far from being wrathful against us, or from needing to be propitiated, loved us enough to set forth Christ as an expiation of our sins through his blood."

Hilasterion is translated as "expiation" in the Revised Standard Version and the New American Bible (Revised Edition), and as "the means of expiating sin" in the New English Bible and the Revised English Bible. The New Revised Standard Version and the New International Version translate this as "sacrifice of atonement".

Dodd argued that in pagan Greek the translation of hilasterion was indeed to propitiate, but that in the Septuagint (the oldest Greek translation of the Hebrew OT) that kapporeth (Hebrew for "covering") is often translated with words that mean "to cleanse or remove". This view was initially challenged by Roger Nicole in twenty-one arguments. Later it was also challenged by Leon Morris who argued that because of the focus in the book of Romans on God's wrath, that the concept of hilasterion needed to include the appeasement of God's wrath. Writing in the New Bible Dictionary, Morris states that "Propitiation is a reminder that God is implacably opposed to everything that is evil, that his opposition may properly be described as 'wrath', and that this wrath is put away only by the atoning work of Christ."

Presbyterian scholar Henry S. Gehman of Princeton Theological Seminary in his New Westminster Bible Dictionary (1970) argued that for hilasterion in Romans 3:25 and hilasmos in 1 John 2:2 and 4:10, "In these cases RSV more properly has 'expiation,' which means the extinguishing of guilt by suffering a penalty or offering a sacrifice as an equivalent. ... It is God who sent forth his Son to be the expiation of sin. Through the death of Christ sins are expiated or annulled, and fellowship is restored."

Likewise, the Anglican theologian and biblical scholar Reginald H. Fuller, writing in The Oxford Companion to the Bible, has noted that while the precise meaning of hilasterion is disputed, and while some translate it as "propitiation", this, he says, "suggests appeasing or placating an angry deity-- a notion hardly compatible with biblical thought and rarely occurring in that sense in the Hebrew Bible. It requires God as its object, whereas in this hymn [Romans 3:24-25] God is the subject: 'whom God put forward.' ... Accordingly, the rendering 'expiation' is the most probable."

In his semantic study of hilasterion David Hill, of the University of Sheffield, claims that Dodd leaves out several Septuagint references to propitiation, and cites apocryphal sources.

Many Reformed theologians stress the idea of propitiation because it specifically addresses dealing with God's wrath, and consider it to be a necessary element for understanding how the atonement as penal substitution makes possible Christ's propitiation for sins by dying in the place of sinners. Critics of penal substitutionary atonement state that seeing the Atonement as appeasing God is a "pagan" idea that makes God seem tyrannical.

J. I. Packer in Knowing God, first published in 1973, designates a distinct difference between pagan and Christian propitiation: "In paganism, man propitiates his gods, and religion becomes a form of commercialism and, indeed, of bribery. In Christianity, however, God propitiates his wrath by his own action. He set forth Jesus Christ, says Paul, to be the propitiation of our sins."

John Stott writes that propitiation "does not make God gracious...God does not love us because Christ died for us, Christ died for us because God loves us". John Calvin, quoting Augustine from John's Gospel cx.6, writes, "Our being reconciled by the death of Christ must not be understood as if the Son reconciled us, in order that the Father, then hating, might begin to love us". Continuing the quote: "... but that we were reconciled to him already, loving, though at enmity with us because of sin. To the truth of both propositions we have the attestation of the Apostle, 'God commendeth his love toward us, in that while we were yet sinners, Christ died for us,' (Rom. 5: 8.) Therefore, he had this love towards us even when, exercising enmity towards him, we were the workers of iniquity. Accordingly, in a manner wondrous and divine, he loved even when he hated us."

Packer also cites God's love as the impetus that provides Christ's sacrifice for the reconciliation of mankind and hence the removal of God's wrath. According to Packer, propitiation (and the wrath of God that propitiation implies) is necessary to properly define God's love; God could not be righteous and "His love would degenerate into sentimentality (without Christ's death containing aspects of propitiation).The wrath of God is as personal, and as potent, as his Love."

Thus the definition of Christian propitiation asserted by Calvin, Packer and Murray holds that within God there is a dichotomy of love and anger, but through propitiation love trumps anger, abolishing it. "'The doctrine of the propitiation is precisely this that God loved the objects of His wrath so much that He gave His own Son to the end that He by His blood should make provision for the removal of this wrath... (John Murray, The Atonement, p. 15)'"

=== Contemporary Catholic theology ===
The Latin Vulgate translates hilasterion in Romans 3:25, and hilasmos in 1 John 4:10, as propitiationem, and this is carried over to the Douay-Rheims Bible as "propitiation". This was also the case with the Confraternity Bible (New Testament 1941). However the promulgation of the encyclical Divino Afflante Spiritu in 1943, and the Second Vatican Council document Dei verbum in 1965, led to increased engagement with biblical manuscripts in the original languages, and ecumenical cooperation in Bible translation. A Catholic Edition of the Revised Standard Version New Testament was published in 1965. And an imprimatur was granted in 1966 to the Oxford Annotated Bible with the Apocrypha by Richard Cardinal Cushing of Boston. Another ecumenical edition of the RSV was published as the Common Bible in 1973. In 1970 the first edition of the New American Bible was published. In both the RSV and the NAB, hilasterion in Romans 3:25, and hilasmos in 1 John 2:2 and 4:10, are translated as "expiation."

The NAB includes a note on the use of "expiation" in Romans 3:25, explaining that "this rendering is preferable to 'propitiation,' which suggests hostility on the part of God toward sinners. As Paul will be at pains to point out (5:8-10), it is humanity that is hostile to God."

Raymond E. Brown in the New Jerome Biblical Commentary argues that in the NT sacrifice (hilasterion) does not appease God's wrath but is best expressed from its Jewish roots (76.89–95) as atonement or expiation (82.73). Recent Catholic studies have depended heavily on the Trinitarian perspective presented by Jesuit theologian Edward J. Kilmartin:

Sacrifice is not, in the first place, an activity of human beings directed to God and, in the second place, something that reaches its goal in the response of divine acceptance and bestowal of divine blessing on the cultic community. Rather, sacrifice in the New Testament understanding – and thus in its Christian understanding – is, in the first place, the self-offering of the Father in the gift of his Son, and in the second place the unique response of the Son in his humanity to the Father, and in the third place, the self-offering of believers in union with Christ by which they share in his covenant relationship with the Father.

Jesuit theologian Robert Daly has explained the background for this renewed understanding. Daly points out that the initiative is entirely with the Father who "loved us and sent his Son as expiation for our sins" (1 John 4:10 NAB), and that "when we see the sacrifice of Christ and the sacrifice of the Mass as a Trinitarian event, we see that, strictly speaking, there are no recipients." He compares the Eucharist to a marriage ceremony that receives its meaning by becoming the reality of one's life.

The French Jesuit theologian and biblical scholar Stanislas Lyonnet has explained the Johannine usage of the term, "When St. John in two different places alludes first to the heavenly intercession of Christ before the Father (1 John 2.2), and then to the work accomplished here below by His death and resurrection (1 Jn 4.10), he declares that He is or that the Father has made Him a 'hilasmos for our sins.' This term certainly carries the same meaning which it always has in O.T. Greek (Vulgate Ps 130.4) and which the Latin word propitiatio also always conveys in the liturgy: through Christ and in Christ, the Father achieves the plan of His eternal love (1 Jn 4.8) in 'showing Himself propitious,' that is in 'pardoning' men, by an efficacious pardon which really destroys sins, which 'purifies' man and communicates to him God's own life (1 Jn 4.9)."

Along similar lines, the entry on "sacrifice" in the Theological Dictionary of the New Testament, after reviewing the epistles of Paul and Hebrews, concludes that "total self-giving, first that of Christ, and then, on this basis, that of his people, is the true meaning of sacrifice." And Cardinal-theologian Walter Kasper, in his book The God of Jesus Christ, concludes that what Jesus effected was to give suffering "eternal import, the import of love." Kasper points out that Gregory of Nyssa and Augustine of Hippo, working out of the New Testament, speak of a God who can freely choose to feel compassion, which implies suffering. Kasper adds that: "It is Origen who gave us the clearest statement. In Origen's words: 'First God suffered, then he came down. What was the suffering he accepted for us? The suffering of love.' Origen adds that it is not just the Son but also the Father who suffers so. This is made possible by God's freedom in love."

Currently, however, some scripture scholars contend that using the word "propitiation" was a mistranslation by Jerome from the Greek hilastērion into the Latin Vulgate, and is misleading for describing the sacrifice of Jesus and its Eucharistic remembrance. One expression of the conclusion of theologians is that sacrifice "is not something human beings do to God (that would be propitiation) but something which God does for human kind (which is expiation)."

== See also ==
- Atonement, Atonement in Christianity, and Atonement in Judaism
- Indulgence
- Justification (theology)
- Penal substitution
- Substitutionary atonement
