= Christian Community Bible =

Series of Catholic bible translations in various languages

- Abbreviation: CCB
- Language: English
- Complete Bible published: 1988
- Textual basis: OT: Hebrew text NT: Greek text
- Translation type: Dynamic equivalence
- Genesis 1:1–3 In the beginning, when God began to create the heavens and the earth, the earth had no form and was void; darkness was over the deep and the Spirit of God hovered over the waters. God said, “Let there be light”; and there was light. John 3:16 Yes, God so loved the world that he gave his only Son that whoever believes in him may not be lost, but may have eternal life.

The Christian Community Bible (CCB) is a translation of the Christian Bible in the English language originally produced in the Philippines.

It is part of a family of translations in multiple languages intended to be more accessible to ordinary readers, particularly those in Third World countries. The primary features of these translations are the use of the language of ordinary people and the inclusion of extensive commentaries aimed at helping its readers to understand the meaning of the biblical texts.

== Version in English ==
=== History ===
The Christian Community Bible began to be produced in 1986 when Rev. Alberto Rossa, a Claretian missionary in the Philippines, saw the need for an English version. With the help of the French priest Bernard Hurault, the translation was finished in 18 months. The work was published in 1988. The editors of the Christian Community Bible consider it to be a very accurate translation from the Hebrew and Greek biblical texts. New editions are currently coordinated by the Pastoral Bible Foundation and are currently published by Claretian Publications (also known as Claretian Communications).

=== Features ===
The editors of the Christian Community Bible have slightly reorganized the books of the bible with respect to the usual Catholic canon. While the New Testament books are found in the same order as they are found in other bibles, this is not the case for the Old Testament (the Hebrew Bible and the deuterocanonical books). According to the introduction to the seventeenth edition: "Here we kept, in broad outlines, the distribution of the books according to the three categories present in the Jewish or Hebrew bible". The result is that the Christian Community Bible's order is a blend of the Jewish and Catholic order (here represented by the Douay–Rheims Bible). The King James Version is also listed for comparison purposes:

Tanakh (Jewish Bible)	Christian Community Bible	Douay–Rheims Bible	King James Version
Torah or Pentateuch
Genesis	Genesis	Genesis	Genesis
Exodus	Exodus	Exodus	Exodus
Leviticus	Leviticus	Leviticus	Leviticus
Numbers	Numbers	Numbers	Numbers
Deuteronomy	Deuteronomy	Deuteronomy	Deuteronomy
Nevi'im or Prophets	Historical books		
Joshua	Joshua	Joshua	Joshua
Judges	Judges	Judges	Judges
see below	see below	Ruth	Ruth
Samuel	1 Samuel	1 Samuel	1 Samuel
Samuel	2 Samuel	2 Samuel	1 Samuel
Kings	1 Kings	1 Kings	1 Kings
Kings	2 Kings	2 Kings	2 Kings
Chronicles see below	1 Chronicles	1 Paralipomenon	1 Chronicles
Chronicles see below	2 Chronicles	2 Paralipomenon	2 Chronicles
Ezra (includes Nehemiah) see below	Ezra	1 Esdras	Ezra
Ezra (includes Nehemiah) see below	Nehemiah	2 Esdras (Nehemias)	Nehemiah
	see below	Tobit	
	see below	Judith	
see below	see below	Esther	Esther
	1 Maccabees (Note: The Latin Vulgate, Douay–Rheims, and Revised Standard Version Catholic Edition place First and Second Maccabees after Malachi; other Catholic translations place them after Esther.)	1 Machabees	
	2 Maccabees	2 Machabees	
		Wisdom books	
see below	see below	Job	Job
see below	see below	Psalms	Psalms
see below	see below	Proverbs	Proverbs
see below	see below	Ecclesiastes	Ecclesiastes
see below	see below	Song of Solomon	Song of Solomon
	see below	Wisdom	
	see below	Ecclesiasticus	
	Major prophets		
Isaiah	Isaiah	Isaias	Isaiah
Jeremiah	Jeremiah	Jeremias	Jeremiah
see below	see below	Lamentations	Lamentations
	see below	Baruch (Note: In Catholic Bibles, Baruch includes a sixth chapter called the Letter of Jeremiah. Baruch is not in the Protestant Bible or the Tanakh.)	
Ezekiel	Ezekiel	Ezechiel	Ezekiel
see below	see below	Daniel (Note: In Catholic and Orthodox Bibles, Daniel includes three sections not included in Protestant Bibles. The Prayer of Azariah and Song of the Three Holy Children are included between Daniel 3:23-24. Susanna is included as Daniel 13. Bel and the Dragon is included as Daniel 14. These are not in the Protestant Old Testament.)	Daniel
	Minor prophets		
The Twelve Prophets	Hosea	Osee	Hosea
The Twelve Prophets	Joel	Joel	Joel
The Twelve Prophets	Amos	Amos	Amos
The Twelve Prophets	Obadiah	Abdias	Obadiah
The Twelve Prophets	Jonah	Jonah	Jonah
The Twelve Prophets	Micah	Micaeus	Micah
The Twelve Prophets	Nahum	Nahum	Nahum
The Twelve Prophets	Habakkuk	Habacuc	Habakkuk
The Twelve Prophets	Zephaniah	Sophonias	Zephaniah
The Twelve Prophets	Haggai	Aggaeus	Haggai
The Twelve Prophets	Zechariah	Zacharias	Zechariah
The Twelve Prophets	Malachi	Malachias	Malachi
see below	Daniel	see above	see above
Ketuvim or Writings (Note: These books are found among the historical and wisdom books of the Christian canons.)			
Psalms	see below	see above	see above
Proverbs	see below	see above	see above
Job	Job	see above	see above
see above	Proverbs	see above	see above
see below	Ecclesiastes	see above	see above
Song of Songs	Song of Songs	see above	see above
Ruth	Ruth	see above	see above
Lamentations	Lamentations	see above	see above
Ecclesiastes	see above	see above	see above
Esther	Esther	see above	see above
	Tobit	see above	
	Judith	see above	
	Baruch	see above	
	Wisdom	see above	
	Sirach	see above	
see above	Psalms	see above	see above
Daniel	see above	see above	see above
Ezra (includes Nehemiah)	see above	see above	see above
Chronicles	see above	see above	see above

== Versions in other languages ==
There are versions of the Christian Community Bible in 10 languages: Indonesian (Kitab Suci Komunitas Kristiani), Chinese (mùlíng shèngjīng), Cebuano (Biblia sa Kristohanong Katilingban), Chavacano, French (Bible des Peuples), Ilonggo (Biblia Sang Katilingban Sang Mga Kristiano), Korean, Quechuan, Spanish (Biblia Latinoamericana) and Tagalog (Biblia ng Sambayanang Pilipino).

=== Chinese ===
The Pastoral Bible was published in 1999 in traditional Chinese (subsequently also available in simplified Chinese). Since its publication, this translation has been in the centre of a controversy regarding the translation process and the content of its commentaries. Because of the criticisms, some regard this translation as being a poor translation unsuitable for lay people without extensive prior theological training; at the same time, despite these criticisms, there are also people who recommend this translation to lay people.

=== French ===
The Bible des Peuples (literally "Bible of the Peoples") is a version translated by Bernard and Louis Hurault and published in 1998. The version is still considered controversial by some in the Jewish community because of replacement theology overtones in its notes.

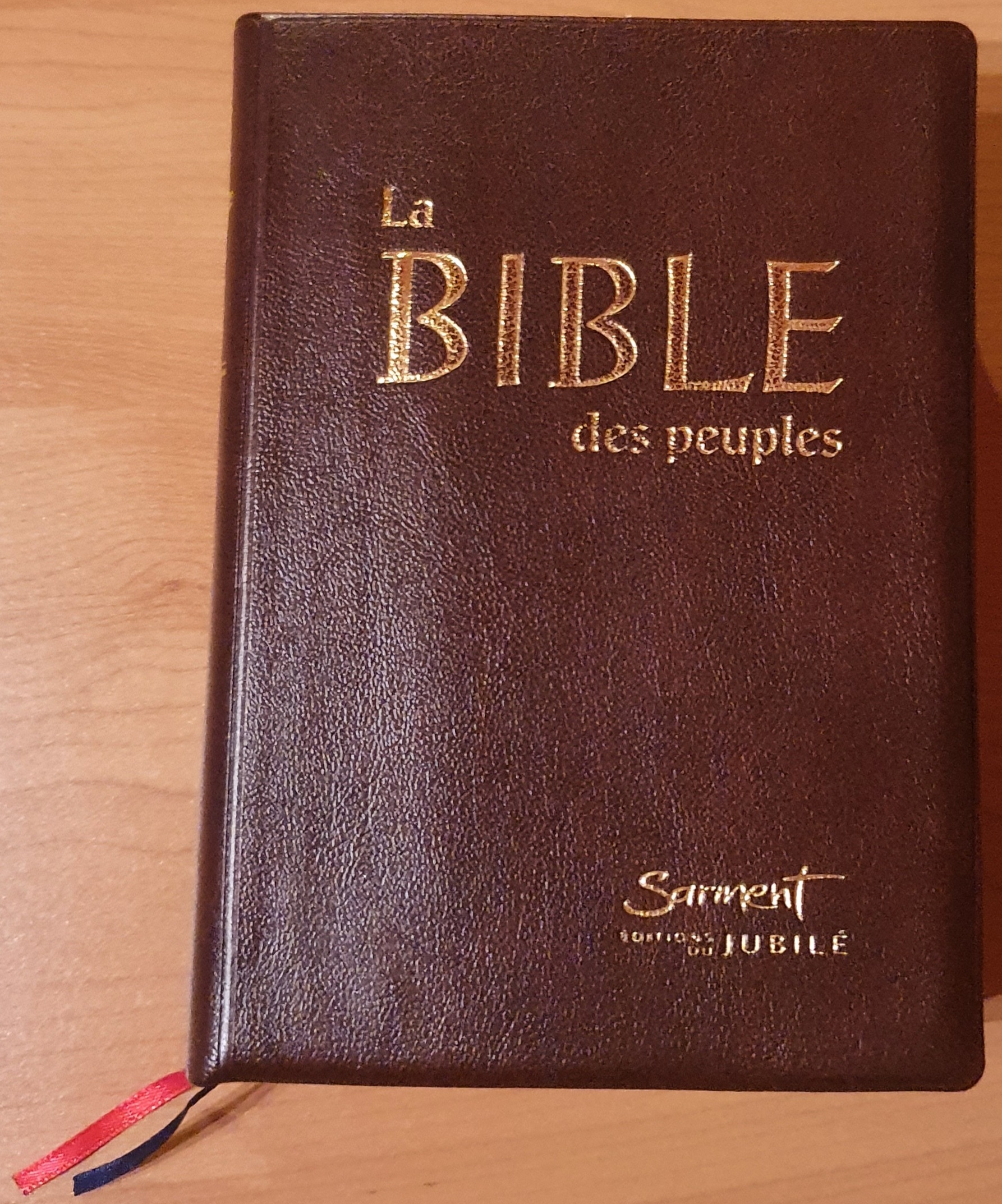
The French edition of the Christian Community Bible

A previous version in French language, called Bible des Communautés chrétiennes (literally "Bible of the Christian Communities"), was translated by Bernard and Louis Hurault and published in 1994. Its imprimatur was rescinded in 1995 amid accusations of having antisemitic overtones in its commentaries.

=== Spanish ===
The Biblia Latinoamérica (literally "Latin America Bible") was begun in 1960 by Rev. Bernardo Hurault in Chile and published in 1972. Hurault decided that a Bible that can be understood by ordinary poor people is needed, and that this Bible should include commentaries to help its readers understand it. He began translating from Hebrew and Greek to Spanish, incorporating his own homilies and questions from his own congregation as commentaries.

This edition was deemed unfit for liturgical use in Argentina (by the CEA). The Congregation for the Doctrine of the Faith along with the bishops of Argentina ordered the elimination or extensive revision of notes, introductions and photographs of a contentious and misleading, often politically driven (see Liberation theology), character.

== See also ==
- Catholic Bible
- Latin Vulgate
- Council of Trent
- Divino afflante Spiritu
- Second Vatican Council
- Dei verbum
- Liturgiam authenticam
