= Revised Standard Version Catholic Edition =

1966 English translation of the Bible

RSV Catholic Edition
- Full name: Revised Standard Version, Catholic Edition
- Abbreviation: RSV-CE or RSVCE
- OT published: 1966
- NT published: 1965
- Derived from: Revised Standard Version with Protestant Apocrypha
- Textual basis: OT: Biblia Hebraica Stuttgartensia with limited Dead Sea Scrolls and Septuagint influence; Deuterocanon: Septuagint with Vulgate influence; NT: Novum Testamentum Graece
- Translation type: Formal equivalence
- Version revision: 2006
- Copyright: Copyrighted 1946, 1952, 1957, 1965, 1966, 2006 by the Division of Christian Education of the National Council of the Churches of Christ in the USA
- Genesis 1:1–3 In the beginning God created the heavens and the earth. The earth was without form and void, and darkness was upon the face of the deep; and the Spirit of God was moving over the face of the waters. And God said, "Let there be light"; and there was light. John 3:16 For God so loved the world that he gave his only Son, that whoever believes in him should not perish but have eternal life.

The Revised Standard Version, Catholic Edition (RSV-CE or RSVCE) is an English translation of the Bible first published in 1966 in the United States. In 1965, the Catholic Biblical Association adapted, under the editorship of Bernard Orchard and Reginald C. Fuller, the ecumenical National Council of Churches' Revised Standard Version (RSV) for Catholic use. It contains the deuterocanonical books of the Old Testament placed in the traditional order of the Vulgate. The editors' stated aim for the RSV Catholic Edition was "to make the minimum number of alterations, and to change only what seemed absolutely necessary in the light of Catholic tradition."

Noted for the formal equivalence of its translation, it is widely used and quoted by Roman Catholic scholars and theologians, and is used for scripture quotations in the Catechism of the Catholic Church.

== Background and Historical Context ==
The 1943 encyclical of Pope Pius XII, Divino afflante Spiritu, encouraged translations of the Catholic Bible from the original languages instead of the Vulgate alone, as had been the tradition since the Council of Trent. "It was in fact with a view to filling this rather obvious gap in the shortest possible time that some Catholic scholars considered the possibility of so editing the Revised Standard Version, on its appearance in 1952, as to make it acceptable to Catholic readers." The proposal to make a Catholic edition received a warm reception from the American Protestant committee that produced the original RSV, but there proved to be many obstacles in bringing it to fruition. Ultimately, the Catholic edition of the RSV New Testament was not published until 1965.

Though the changes in the Catholic edition were generally minor, its publication was a testament to the swelling ecumenical feelings of the time. In the same year, shortly before the end of Vatican II, Pope Paul VI promulgated Dei verbum, which states that "since the word of God should be accessible at all times, the Church by her authority and with maternal concern sees to it that suitable and correct translations are made into different languages, especially from the original texts of the sacred books. And should the opportunity arise and the Church authorities approve, if these translations are produced in cooperation with the separated brethren [i.e., Protestants] as well, all Christians will be able to use them."

The complete Bible with the Catholic edition of the RSV Old Testament followed shortly afterward in 1966. No changes were made to the text of the Old Testament, but seven books of the Protestant Apocrypha (including the additional portions of Esther and Daniel) were reordered to reflect their status as part of the Catholic Old Testament canon, while three other books that had been included in the RSV Apocrypha were excluded as noncanonical: 1 or 3 Esdras, 2 or 4 Esdras, and the Prayer of Manasseh.

== RSV Second Catholic Edition (RSV-2CE) ==
Cover of The Ignatius Bible (RSV-2CE), designed by Christopher J. Pelicano, featuring Christ Pantocrator at the center and the Four Evangelists Tetramorph at the corners

In early 2006, Ignatius Press released the Revised Standard Version, Second Catholic Edition (RSV-2CE). The Ignatius Edition "was revised according to [the norms of] Liturgiam authenticam, 2001" and "approved under the same [i.e. 1966] imprimatur by the Secretariat for Doctrine and Pastoral Practices, National Council of Catholic Bishops, February 29, 2000." To that end, Ignatius Press submitted its proposed revisions to the United States Conference of Catholic Bishops and to the Congregation for Divine Worship, making specifically-requested changes to those portions of the text in liturgical use as lectionary readings. As with the original RSV and its first Catholic edition, the translation copyright remains in the hands of the National Council of Churches. The RSV-2CE is the basis for Ignatius Press' The Ignatius Catholic Study Bible: New Testament, and is likewise used in Midwest Theological Forum's The Didache Bible, a study Bible with commentaries based on the Catechism of the Catholic Church. The full Ignatius Catholic Study Bible, including both the Catholic Old Testament and the New Testament, was published in Fall 2024. The RSV-2CE is also the translation used in the English-language version Great Adventure Catholic Bible, published by Ascension Press. Father Mike Schmitz reads from this translation in his podcast, The Bible in a Year.

The Second Catholic Edition removed archaic pronouns (thee, thou) and accompanying verb forms (didst, speaketh), revised passages used in the lectionary according to the Vatican document Liturgiam authenticam and elevated some passages out of RSV footnotes when they favored Catholic renderings. For instance, the RSV-2CE renders "almah" as "virgin" in Isaiah 7:14, restores the term "begotten" in John 1:18 and other verses, uses the phrase "full of grace" instead of "favored one" in Luke 1:28, and substitutes "mercy" for "steadfast love" (translated from the Hebrew hesed) throughout the Psalms.

=== Liturgical use and endorsements ===
Catholic authors Scott Hahn, Curtis Mitch, and Jimmy Akin use the RSV-2CE.

Although the revised lectionary based on the New American Bible is the only English-language lectionary that may be used at Roman Rite Catholic Mass in the United States, the Revised Standard Version, Second Catholic Edition has been approved for liturgical use in Ordinariate Catholic parishes for former Anglicans around the world. To that end, Ignatius Press has published a lectionary based on the RSV-2CE, approved for use by the Episcopal Conference of the Antilles and by the Congregation for Divine Worship and the Discipline of the Sacraments for use in the personal ordinariates. The Personal Ordinariate of Our Lady of Walsingham in the United Kingdom has adopted the RSV-2CE as "the sole lectionary authorized for use" in its liturgies.

In November 2015, the Catholic Bishops' Conference of England and Wales decided to ask approval to use it in a new lectionary for England and Wales. However, ultimately the English Standard Version, a later revision of the RSV, was chosen as the basis for the new lectionary in that country.

== See also ==
- The Catholic Living Bible (imprimatur and nihil obstat for deuterocanonical books only)
- New Revised Standard Version Catholic Edition
- Good News Translation Catholic Edition
- New Living Translation Catholic Edition
- English Standard Version Catholic Edition
