= Magnum principium =

2017 apostolic letter by Pope Francis

Magnum principium ("The Great Principle") is an apostolic letter issued by Pope Francis motu proprio ("on his own authority") and dated 3 September 2017. It modified the 1983 Code of Canon Law to shift responsibility and authority for translations of liturgical texts into modern languages to national and regional conferences of bishops and restrict the role of the Congregation for Divine Worship and the Discipline of the Sacraments (CDW). It was made public on 9 September 2017 and its effective date was 1 October of the same year.

While directly concerned only with liturgical texts, it represented a significant initiative in the program long advocated by Francis of changing the role of the Roman Curia in the Catholic Church and fostering "shared decision-making between local churches and Rome". (Note: In his exhortation Evangelii gaudium (2013), the first major work of his papacy, Francis addressed the need to alter the balance between Rome and national or regional conferences of bishops: "The Second Vatican Council stated that ... episcopal conferences are in a position 'to contribute in many and fruitful ways to the concrete realization of the collegial spirit.' Yet this desire has not been fully realized, since a juridical status of episcopal conferences which would see them as subjects of specific attributions, including genuine doctrinal authority, has not yet been sufficiently elaborated. Excessive centralization, rather than proving helpful, complicates the Church's life and her missionary outreach.") That he used canon law to achieve his aims demonstrated, in the view of liturgist Rita Ferrone, the intensity of his commitment to this project.

== Background ==
The "Great Principle" to which the opening words of the letter referred, established by the Second Vatican Council, asserted that liturgical prayer should "be accommodated to the comprehension of the people so that it might be understood".

For several decades the Catholic Church has increased the use of the vernacular in place of Latin in its liturgies. The Sacred Congregation of Rites, predecessor of the CDW, granted permission for the use of local languages in several countries with expanding missionary activity, including Mandarin Chinese in Mass except for the Canon in 1949 and Hindi in India in 1950. For rituals other than Mass, it gave permission for the use of a French translation in 1948 and a German one in 1951.

The Council's Constitution on the Sacred Liturgy, Sacrosanctum Concilium, issued by Pope Paul VI on 4 December 1963, discussed the use of the vernacular in the context of the need to enhance lay participation in liturgies. It suggested an increased use of the "mother tongue" of the congregation and instructed local groups of bishops to consider the role of the vernacular. It "opened up the possibility of linguistic change but did not make it mandatory".

As local groups of bishops and Vatican authorities disputed the quality and nature of translations, the CDW's instruction Liturgiam Authenticam, issued on 28 March 2001 with the approval of Pope John Paul II, ruled that texts "insofar as possible, must be translated integrally and in the most exact manner, without omissions or additions in terms of their content, and without paraphrases or glosses. Any adaptation to the characteristics or the nature of the various vernacular languages is to be sober and discreet." One side in the ongoing debate promoted the philosophy of translation called dynamic equivalence, roughly "sense-for-sense" translation, rather than the more literal word-for-word translation that John Paul said was required. (Note: An oft-cited example of these approaches to translation are the Latin words used in the consecration pro multis, variously translated as "for many", "for the many", "for all men", or "for all".)

In the 21st century, Catholic bishops in Germany decided not to work with a commission Pope Benedict XVI erected to guide their translation efforts and then found their own translations rejected by the CDW. French, Italian and Spanish translations were rejected as well. The CDW also dictated much of the work and staffing of the multi-national board, the International Commission on English in the Liturgy (ICEL), created to produce English translations, which have met with criticism. The bishops of Japan contested the Vatican's right to judge the quality of a translation into Japanese, questioning both the quality of the review and the subsidiary position in which the CDW's review placed them.

== Content ==
In Magnum principium, Francis outlined the mission of the translation effort of liturgical texts:

The goal of the translation of liturgical texts and of biblical texts for the Liturgy of the Word is to announce the word of salvation to the faithful in obedience to the faith and to express the prayer of the Church to the Lord. For this purpose it is necessary to communicate to a given people using its own language all that the Church intended to communicate to other people through the Latin language. While fidelity cannot always be judged by individual words but must be sought in the context of the whole communicative act and according to its literary genre, nevertheless some particular terms must also be considered in the context of the entire Catholic faith because each translation of texts must be congruent with sound doctrine.

While acknowledging the role Latin continues to play in Catholic liturgy, he expressed confidence that translations could achieve a similar status, that over time "vernacular languages themselves [...] would be able to become liturgical languages, standing out in a not dissimilar way to liturgical Latin for their elegance of style and the profundity of their concepts".

Where the Council fathers spoke of the participation of the laity, Francis wrote of "their right to a conscious and active participation in liturgical celebration".

He recognized the role of the CDW and said that to promote "vigilant and creative collaboration full of reciprocal trust" between the CDW and conferences of bishops he thought "some principles handed on since the time of the [Second Vatican] Council should be more clearly reaffirmed and put into practice".

Magnum principium modified two clauses in canon 838 of the Code of Canon Law. Before its modifications the passage at issue read:

§2 It is the prerogative of the Apostolic See to regulate the sacred liturgy of the universal Church, to publish liturgical books and review their vernacular translations, and to be watchful that liturgical regulations are everywhere faithfully observed.

§3 It pertains to Episcopal Conferences to prepare vernacular translations of liturgical books, with appropriate adaptations as allowed by the books themselves and, with the prior review of the Holy See, to publish these translations.

The revised text read (highlighting in original):

§2. It is for the Apostolic See to order the sacred liturgy of the universal Church, publish liturgical books, recognise adaptations approved by the Episcopal Conference according to the norm of law, and exercise vigilance that liturgical regulations are observed faithfully everywhere.

§3. It pertains to the Episcopal Conferences to faithfully prepare versions of the liturgical books in vernacular languages, suitably accommodated within defined limits, and to approve and publish the liturgical books for the regions for which they are responsible after the confirmation of the Apostolic See.

=== Accompanying Note ===
A note accompanying the release of Magnum principium authored by Archbishop Arthur Roche, secretary of the CDW, explained that the CDW was tasked with confirming a translation, that the process "leaves responsibility for the translation, presumed to be faithful, to [...] the bishops' conference", and "presupposes a positive evaluation of the faithfulness and congruence of the produced texts with respect to the Latin text". The CDW's role is to ratify the bishop's approval, not to review the translation itself. The CDW still has a role in reviewing "adaptations", that is, additions to liturgical texts, rather than translations per se. The term adaptations, as used by liturgists, refers to modifications introduced into a liturgy to incorporate or reflect local culture, which can include practices, movement, costume, and music as well as text. The more common term for this undertaking is inculturation. The note also stated that "The object of the changes is to define better the roles of the Apostolic See and the Conferences of Bishops in respect to their proper competencies which are different yet remain complementary."

== October 2017 letter clarifications ==
In October 2017, Cardinal Robert Sarah, then prefect of the CDW, sent a commentary (of which Sarah was not the author) on Magnum principium to the pope; the commentary was published on many websites.

However, in a letter made to "avoid any misunderstanding" and published 22 October, Pope Francis rebuked Sarah's view. Francis clarified that "now the norm concedes to episcopal conferences the faculty of judging the worth and coherence of one or another term in translations from the original, even if in dialogue with the Holy See". He added that now, with Magnum principium, these translations did not need to conform to all points of Liturgiam authenticam. He furthermore stated that while the CDW still had to approve all official liturgical translations, this approval process "no longer supposes a detailed, word by word examination, except in obvious cases that can be presented to the bishops for further reflection".

The pope also said that the new process should not lead "to a spirit of 'imposition' on the episcopal conferences of a translation done by the congregation", but that it should promote dialogue and cooperation.

The pope concluded his letter by asking Sarah to send the letter "to all Episcopal Conferences" and to "the members and consultors" of the CDW.

== Reactions ==
In The Tablet, Christopher Lamb wrote that Magnum principium "throws open the possibility that the 2011 English Roman Missal–which became mired in disagreement with claims that the Vatican had overly controlled the process–could be changed. The onus will now be on local bishops to take the initiative." In America, liturgist John F. Baldovin wrote: "those conferences which have been experiencing tension with the Vatican over revised translations, like the French-speaking and German-speaking, now have much more breathing room in deciding what is best for translating liturgical texts".

Cardinal Blaise Cupich thought Francis was "reconnecting the church with the Second Vatican Council" by "giving in this document an authoritative interpretation of the council as it relates to the responsibilities of bishops for the liturgical life of the church". The Bishops of England and Wales "welcome[d] the Holy Father's Motu Proprio [...] and the affirmation of the role of the Bishops' Conference in the oversight of the Liturgy".

Cardinal Reinhard Marx of Munich-Freising said that German bishops felt "great relief" and the Episcopal Conference of Germany thanked Francis for underlining the "genuine doctrinal authority" of episcopal conferences.

== Postquam Summus Pontifex ==
On 22 October 2021, the Congregation for Divine Worship released the decree Postquam Summus Pontifex. The decree is an interpretation as well as corrections of previous documents, to correct what is found to be contrary to Magnum principium in such previous document, i.e. "in the Institutiones generales and in the Prænotanda of the liturgical books, as well as in the Instructions, Declarations, and Notifications published by this Dicastery according to the old norms of §§ 2 and 3 of can. 838". For example, those changes apply to Liturgiam authenticam.

== See also ==
- Dei verbum
- Divino afflante Spiritu
- Liturgiam authenticam
- Liturgical movement
- Liturgical reforms of Pope Pius XII
- Verbum Domini
