= Knox Bible =

1940s translation of the Bible by Ronald Knox

The Knox Bible
- Full name: The Holy Bible: A Translation From the Latin Vulgate in the Light of the Hebrew and Greek Originals
- Language: English
- OT published: 1949
- NT published: 1945
- Authorship: Ronald Knox
- Publisher: Burns & Oates, London
- Religious affiliation: Catholic Church
- Genesis 1:1–3 God, at the beginning of time, created heaven and earth. Earth was still an empty waste, and darkness hung over the deep; but already, over its waters, stirred the breath of God. Then God said, Let there be light; and the light began. John 3:16 God so loved the world, that he gave up his only-begotten Son, so that those who believe in him may not perish, but have eternal life.

The Holy Bible: A Translation From the Latin Vulgate in the Light of the Hebrew and Greek Originals is a Catholic version of the Bible in three volumes (later published in one volume editions) translated by Monsignor Ronald Knox, an English theologian, priest, and crime writer. It is more commonly known as the Knox Bible or Knox Version.

It is based on the Clementine Vulgate of 1592, with adjustments. Originally two different renditions of the Psalms were provided, to reflect the recent introduction of the Pian Psalter.

== Origin and publication ==
In 1936, Ronald Knox was requested by the Catholic hierarchies of England and Wales to undertake a new translation of the Vulgate with use of contemporary language and in light of Hebrew and Greek manuscripts. When the New Testament was published in 1945, it was not intended to replace the Rheims version but to be used alongside it, as Bernard Griffin, the Archbishop of Westminster, noted in the preface.

With the release of Knox's version of the Old Testament in 1950, the popularity of translations based on the Vulgate waned as church authorities promoted the use of Bibles based primarily on Hebrew and Greek texts following the 1943 encyclical Divino afflante Spiritu. The Knox Bible was, however, one of the approved vernacular versions of the Bible used in the lectionary readings for Mass from 1965 to the early 1970s, along with the Confraternity Bible.

== Style ==
The style of the translation is in idiomatic English and much freer in renderings of passages than the Douay version. With the Deuterocanonical books, the interpretation of the passages was brought closer to the Septuagint. When the Latin appeared to be doubtful, the translation of the text was based on other languages, with the Latin translation placed in the footnote.

== Later editions ==
Templegate Publishers produced a facsimile of the New Testament in 1997.

The Anglican Archbishop of Canterbury, Rowan Williams, commented on the new Baronius Press edition, saying: "Ronald Knox's translation of the Bible remains an exceptional achievement both of scholarship and of literary dedication. Again and again it successfully avoids conventional options and gives the scriptural text a fresh flavour, often with a brilliantly idiosyncratic turn of phrase. It most certainly deserves republication, study and use".

== See also ==
- Catholic Bible
