= New American Bible =

English-language Catholic Book translation

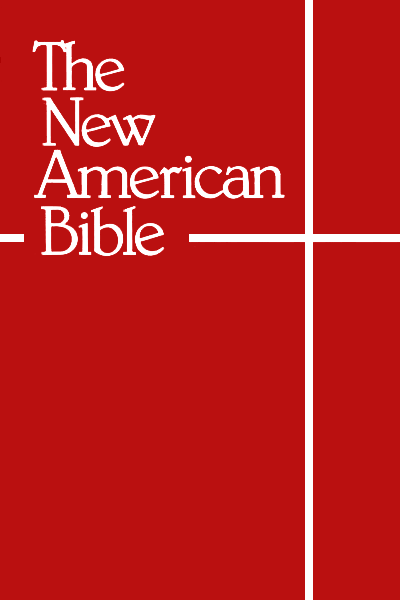
- Full name: The New American Bible
- Abbreviation: NAB
- Complete Bible published: 1970
- Derived from: Confraternity Bible
- Textual basis: NT: Novum Testamentum Graece 25th edition. OT: Biblia Hebraica Stuttgartensia with Septuagint and Dead Sea Scrolls influence. Deuterocanonicals: Septuagint, Dead Sea Scrolls, and some Vulgate influence.
- Translation type: Formal equivalence (from the Preface), moderate use of dynamic equivalence.
- Reading level: High School
- Revision: New American Bible Revised Edition
- Religious affiliation: Catholic Church
- Webpage: bible.usccb.org/bible
- Genesis 1:1–3 In the beginning, when God created the heavens and the earth, the earth was a formless wasteland, and darkness covered the abyss, while a mighty wind swept over the waters. Then God said, "Let there be light," and there was light. John 3:16 Yes, God so loved the world that he gave his only Son, that whoever believes in him may not die but may have eternal life.

The New American Bible (NAB) is a Catholic English translation of the Bible first published in 1970. Stemming originally from the Confraternity Bible, a translation of the Vulgate by the Confraternity of Christian Doctrine, the project transitioned to translating the original biblical languages in response to Pope Pius XII's 1943 encyclical Divino afflante Spiritu. The translation was sponsored by the U.S. bishops' committee on the Confraternity of Christian Doctrine and carried out in stages by members of the Catholic Biblical Association of America (CBA) "from the Original Languages with Critical Use of All the Ancient Sources" (as the title pages state). These efforts eventually became The New American Bible under the liturgical principles and reforms of the Second Vatican Council (1962–1965). A revision of the New Testament was published in 1986.

Since 1998, the NAB with revised NT is the basis of the sole English-language lectionary approved for use during Mass in the United States. The 1970 NAB is also approved for use in the Episcopal Church in the United States.

== First edition ==
The first edition of The New American Bible was published on September 30, 1970. It was compiled by 51 scholars from 1944 to 1970, overseen by an editorial board headed by Father Stephen J. Hartdegen. It was translated from Hebrew, Greek, and Aramaic, rather than from the Latin Vulgate, as previous Catholic translations of the Bible into English had been; it also incorporated then-newly discovered documents such as the Dead Sea Scrolls and the Masada manuscript.

== New Testament revision ==
A revised edition of the New Testament translation of The New American Bible was published in 1986. Protestant biblical scholar Bruce M. Metzger has called the revision "a substantial improvement over the previous edition."

== Psalms revision ==
A revised version of the Psalms was published in 1991.

== Revised Edition ==
In 1994, work began on a revision of the Old Testament.

In September 2008, the Ad Hoc Committee accepted the final book of the Old Testament, namely, Jeremiah. In November of that year, the United States Conference of Catholic Bishops approved the complete Old Testament, including footnotes and introductions, but they would not permit it to be published with the Book of Psalms of 1991, for which permission for liturgical use had been withdrawn in 1994—the 1998 edition of the lectionary for the U.S. used the Grail Psalms instead, which the Holy See approved and which replaced the original NAB Psalter for lectionaries for Mass in the United States. The Psalms were again revised in 2008 and sent to the Bishops Committee on Divine Worship but also rejected in favor of the revised Grail Psalter. A final revision of the NAB Psalter was undertaken using suggestions that the Ad Hoc Committee vetted and to more strictly conform to the instruction Liturgiam Authenticam.

In January 2011, it was announced that the Revised Edition of the NAB would be published on March 9 of that year.

== Future editions of the NAB ==
In 2012, the USCCB "announced a plan to revise the New Testament of the New American Bible Revised Edition so a single version can be used for individual prayer, catechesis and liturgy." On November 11, 2025, it was announced that the revised translation would be published in 2027 with a new name, The Catholic American Bible (CAB).

== See also ==
- Catholic Bible
- Dei verbum
- International Commission on English in the Liturgy (ICEL)

== Bibliography ==
- The New World Dictionary-Concordance to the New American Bible (first ed.). World, Collins (New York). 1970. pp. 772. ISBN 0-529-04540-0. LCCN 72-777415. OCLC 318462709 – via Internet Archive. (with imprimatur of Hector Cunial in Latin: Archiepiscopus Soleropolitan, Vicesregens Vicariatu Urbis, Vicesgerens Typis Pontificis Universitatis Gregorianae, as it is also attested in Gregorianum. Vol. 53. 1972. p. 4.
