= Ego eimi =

First person singular present active indicative of the verb "to be" in ancient Greek

Ego eimi (Ancient Greek: ἐγώ εἰμι [eɡɔ̌ː eːmí]) "I am", "I exist", is the first person singular present active indicative of the verb "to be" in ancient Greek. The use of this phrase in some of the uses found in the Gospel of John (particularly in John 8:58) is considered to have theological significance by many Christians.

== Classical Greek ==
Earlier philologists drew a firm distinction between εἰμί used as a copula (‘X is Y’) (Note: This copula is often omitted in the present tense.) and accented ἔστι(ν) with a post-posed subject expressing existence, often translated into English as "there is/are". More modern scholarship argues that treating “copular be” and “existential be” as rigidly separate categories can be misleading.

== Koine Greek ==
Absolute (self-identifying) use in Hellenistic Greek broadly continues classical usage:

- Septuagint 2 Samuel (or 2 Kings) 2:19-20 "And Asahel chased closely after Abner and did not turn to the right or the left in following Abner. And Abner looked over to his behind and said, "Is it you, Asahel?" And he said, "I am." ("ego eimi")"
- Gospel of John 9:8-9 "The neighbors and those who had seen him before as a beggar began to ask, "Is this not the man who used to sit and beg?" Some were saying, "It is he." Others were saying, "No, but it is someone like him." He kept saying, "I am he." ("ego eimi")"

In comparison not absolute usage also remains largely similar:

- Septuagint Exodus 3:14 "And God said to Moses, saying "I am the One who exists (Note: Alternatively: the One who is (NETS 2007))." ("ego eimi ho on") And he said, "Thus you shall say to the sons of Israel, 'The One who exists (Note: Alternatively the One who is (NETS 2007)) ("ho on") has sent me to you.' "

== Christian exegesis ==
=== Patristic exegesis ===
Ambrose (ca. 340-400) took "I am" not as merely related to Abraham, but a statement including from before Adam. In his Exposition of the Christian Faith, Book III wrote: "In its extent, the preposition “before” reaches back into the past without end or limit, and so “Before Abraham was, [ἐγώ εἰμι]” clearly does not mean “after Adam,” just as “before the Morning Star” does not mean “after the angels.” But when He said “before [πριν],” He intended, not that He was included in any one's existence, but that all things are included in His, for thus it is the custom of Holy Writ to show the eternity of God."

John Chrysostom (ca. 349-407) attached more theological significance to ego eimi, In his 55th Homily on John: "But wherefore said He not, Before Abraham was, "I was" (ἐγώ ἦν), instead of "I Am" (ἐγώ εἰμι)? As the Father uses this expression, I Am (ἐγώ εἰμι), so also does Christ; for it signifies continuous Being, irrespective of all time. On which account the expression seemed to them to be blasphemous."

=== Modern Evangelical exegesis ===
The texts of particular uses of interest to many Christians are the series in Gospel of John 4:26, 6:20, 8:24, 8:28, 8:58, (excluding the man born blind, John 9:9) 13:19, 15:1, 18:5, which collectively are often identified as John's "'I am' statements".

In Protestant commentaries it is often stated that "whenever John reports Jesus as saying ego eimi, a claim to deity is implicit." In commentaries the English "I am" is sometimes capitalised "I AM" to demonstrate a connection with how the English Bibles often capitalize words where the Hebrew text has the Tetragrammaton (YHWH), e.g. as the use of "LORD" in the King James Version. For example; "These mighty words come from the Greek words ego eimi, which is more accurately translated, "I AM!". This is also found in some Catholic commentaries. This connection is made because it is assumed that ego eimi is related to I am that I am or Hebrew Ehyeh-Asher-Ehyeh in Exodus 3:14.

=== Catholic ===
Modern Catholic scholarship also tends to see a theophany presented in the preponderance of the "I am" statements in the Gospels. Raymond Brown sees a play on words in the story recounted in John 6:20 where the disciples in the boat are terrified when they see a man walking towards them on the water, and Jesus reassures them, ‘I AM; do not be afraid.’ Brown sees a twofold meaning: the obvious story line meaning of 'it is I' and a higher sacral meaning inherent in Jesus' walking calmly on the storm-tossed waves and then bringing them safely ashore.

== Grammatical issues ==
=== Predicate ===
The absence of an immediate predicate ("I am X") may still require an implied predicate. For example A. T. Robertson in discussing John 8:24 notes the lack of a predicate after the copula eimi. But identifies either an implied predicate:

- "either "that I am from above" (verse 23), "that I am the one sent from the Father or [I am] the Messiah" (7:18,28), "that I am the Light of the World" (8:12), "that I am the Deliverer from the bondage of sin" (8:28,31f.,36),

or:

- "that I am" without supplying a predicate in the absolute sense as the Jews (De 32:39) used the language of Jehovah (cf. Isa 43:10 where the very words occur; hina pisteusete hoti ego eimi). K. L. McKay considers the John "I am" statements to be primarily normal use with predicate, "I am X", "I am the true vine" etc.

=== Verbal tense and aspect ===
==== "...I am" ====
It is generally considered, for example by Daniel B. Wallace, that if that the intention of John was to state "I was" then the text should instead contain the corresponding past tense form which is ego ēn "I was", as in English and elsewhere in the New Testament.

- KJV (1611) RV, RSV, NRSV, ESV, NIV: "Before Abraham was, I am."
- ASV, NASB (1995): "before Abraham was born, I am."
- The Passion Translation "I have existed long before Abraham was born, for I AM!”
- YLT "Verily, verily, I say to you, Before Abraham's coming -- I am."
- NKJV "Most assuredly, I say to you, before Abraham was, I AM." (Good News Translation GNT; International Standard Version ISV; Phillips; Jubillee Bible 2000; Modern English Version MEV and other translations render it in capital letters "I AM" as well, to indicate the Title element)

==== "...I have been" ====
However in John 8:58 a few Bibles have renderings of eimi in past tenses:

- The United Bible Societies Hebrew New Testament has ani hayiti "I was" not ani hu "I am."
- George R. Noyes, Unitarian - The New Testament (Boston, 1871). "Before Abraham was born I was already what I am." and (in the 1904 edition) "I was."
- The Twentieth Century New Testament (TCNT) supervised by J. Rendel Harris and Richard Francis Weymouth (Britain, 1900). "I have existed before Abraham was born."
- James Moffatt, The Bible A New Translation (New York, 1935). "I am here – and I was before Abraham!"
- J. M. P. Smith and E. J. Goodspeed An American Translation (1935) "I existed before Abraham was born!"
- The New World Translation (1950, 1984) "before Abraham came to be, I have been."; (2013) "before Abraham came into existence, I have been."
- J. A. Kleist S.J. and J. L. Lilly C.M., Roman Catholic - The New Testament (Milwaukee, 1956). "I was before Abraham."
- William F. Beck, Lutheran - The New Testament in the Language of Today (St. Louis, 1963). "I was in existence before Abraham was ever born."
- Kenneth N. Taylor, The Living Bible (Wheaton, 1979). "I was in existence before Abraham was ever born!"
- The poet Richard Lattimore, The Four Gospels and the Revelation (New York, 1979). "I existed before Abraham was born."
- ed. Stanley L. Morris, The Simple English Bible (1981) "I was alive before Abraham was born."
- C. B. Williams, The New Testament in the Language of the People (Nashville, 1986). "I most solemnly say to you, I existed before Abraham was born."

This reading is supported by a minority of modern scholars:

Jason BeDuhn, cites Herbert Weir Smyth's grammar which shows examples in classical narratives of where a use of Greek present can be translated by English present perfect progressive, and BeDuhn argues for a "past progressive" translation such as "I have been." Thomas A. Howe accused BeDuhn of producing insufficient evidence for the claim that it is an idiom. BeDuhn has objected to Howe's critique, describing it as "a mess of circular argument, special pleading, and irrelevant 'evidence.'" Robert Bowman and BeDuhn conducted a lengthy online discussion in 2005 regarding the translation of this verse. The emails were collated and are available online here.

Kenneth L. McKay considers ego eimi in John 8:58 to be used emphatically as in "I exist" meaning I have been in existence, therefore that Jesus has existed longer than Abraham, and considers John 8:58 "quite unlikely" to be a reference to Exodus 3:14. Against this Daniel B. Wallace replies that McKay's reading would not apply in first person discourse.

=== Before + participle genesthai ===
In Greek the structure prin A ______, B ____ ("before A ___, B ___") does not indicate tense in the first verb after prin (before), whether this is "before becomes/became/will become" can only be inferred from the second clause "B ____" after the comma. For example: prin genesthai "before it will happen" (John 14:29) implies a future "it will become" even though the "I have told you" is past.

This Greek structure resembles Wycliffe's 1395 translation from the Latin:

Therfor Jhesus seide to hem, Treuli, treuli, Y seie to you, bifor that Abraham schulde be, Y am.

==== Sozzini ====
In the case of John 8:58 since the structure "before" + deponent does not carry any indication of tense in Greek, some have considered that the more natural context of "before γενέσθαι + present verb" would be future, "before Abraham becomes". However the interpretation πρὶν Ἀβραὰμ γενέσθαι as "before Abraham becomes" is rare, and Fausto Sozzini and Valentinus Smalcius were perhaps the first to advocate the reading "before Abraham becomes [father of many nations] I am [he, namely, the Messiah]".

==== Calvin ====
Another consideration, advanced by John Calvin, is the comparison of Abraham 'coming into existence', "γενέσθαι", compared with Jesus declaring his existence with present tense "eimi", implies an eternal pre-existence. He considers this to be contextually more probable and additionally sees a connection to Hebrews 13:8 "Jesus Christ is the same yesterday and today and forever."
