= Grail Psalms =

Book of Psalms with translation by A. J. Maas

The Grail Psalms refers to various editions of an English translation of the Book of Psalms, first published completely as The Psalms: A New Translation in 1963 (Note: While 1963 is the copyright date for the complete set, some of the psalms were published in other books earlier. For example, the book "Twenty Four Psalms and a Canticle: arranged for singing" has on page 6, "© Ladies of the Grail, (England) 1956". Psalm 2 has slightly different words to the version published in 1963, but Psalms 8 and 22 have the same words.) by the Ladies of the Grail. The translation was modeled on the French La Bible de Jérusalem, according to the school of Fr. Joseph Gelineau: a simple vernacular, arranged in sprung rhythm to be suitable for liturgical song and chant (see: Gelineau psalmody). All official Catholic English translations of the Liturgy of the Hours use the Grail Psalms.

== History ==
The Grail Psalms were already popular before the Second Vatican Council revised the liturgies of the Roman Rite. Because the Council called for more liturgical use of the vernacular instead of Latin, and also for more singing and chanting (as opposed to the silent Low Mass and privately recited Divine Office, which were the predominantly celebrated forms of the Roman rite before the Council), the Grail Psalms were utilised as the official liturgical Psalter by most of the English-speaking world.

The Grail Psalms were utilized by the International Commission on English in the Liturgy in their translation of The Liturgy of the Hours in 1973. They were also utilized, with some minor alterations, in a parallel translation of the Liturgy of the Hours titled The Divine Office in 1974. As these are the only two officially recognized Roman Catholic translations of the canonical hours in English, the Grail became the de facto liturgical Psalter. Some Episcopal Conferences, such as that of England and Wales, also adopted the Grail for the Responsorial Psalms in the Lectionary for Mass. The Ruthenian Catholic Church adopted the Grail Psalms for chanting in 2007.

A separate edition of the Grail Psalms, revised with inclusive language, was produced in 1986. It was expressly forbidden for liturgical use. The 1994 ICEL Psalter issued for study and comment was another alternative to the Grail Psalms, but never approved for liturgical use. The Imprimatur to this text was later revoked.

In 2001, Pope John Paul II promulgated the encyclical Liturgiam authenticam, which called for a more literal translation of liturgical texts. This led to an interest in updating the Grail. In 2008, Conception Abbey completed a wide-scale revision in accordance with this instruction, published under the title The Revised Grail Psalms. This version is used in the edition of The Liturgy of the Hours published by Paulines Publications Africa, now promulgated for use in every Bishops' Conference of Africa.

In 2010, the Holy See granted recognitio of The Revised Grail Psalms with certain modifications; this modified edition is the one in force for several Bishops' Conferences including the United States Conference of Catholic Bishops.

In the General Assembly of the USCCB of November 2014, the U.S. Bishops voted to adopt a further revision of the Revised Grail Psalms. In 2019 the USCCB acquired the rights to the Revised Grail from the monks of Conception Abbey, and released a new revision titled Abbey Psalms and Canticles, which would "gradually be incorporated into the Church’s official liturgical books". The Bishops of England and Wales confirmed in January 2021 that this version would be adopted for the psalms and canticles used in the lectionary and in the Liturgy of the Hours.

== Example comparison between the Grail (1963), Revised Grail (2010) and Abbey (2018) ==
From Psalm 63 (62):2–9.

GRAIL PSALMS (1963)	REVISED GRAIL PSALMS (2010)	ABBEY PSALMS AND CANTICLES (2018)
2 O Gód, you are my Gód, for you I lóng; for yóu my sóul is thírsting. My bódy pínes for yóu like a drý, weary lánd without wáter. 3 So I gáze on yóu in the sánctuary to sée your stréngth and your glóry. 4 For your lóve is bétter than lífe, my líps will spéak your práise. 5 So I will bléss you áll my lífe, in your náme I will líft up my hánds. 6 My sóul shall be fílled as with a bánquet, my móuth shall praíse you with jóy. 7 On my béd I remémber yóu. On yóu I múse through the níght 8 for yóu have béen my hélp; in the shádow of your wíngs I rejóice. 9 My sóul clíngs to yóu; your ríght hand hólds me fást.	2 O God, you are my God; at dawn I seek you; for you my soul is thirsting. For you my flesh is pining, like a dry, weary land without water. 3 I have come before you in the sanctuary, to behold your strength and your glory. 4 Your loving mercy is better than life; my lips will speak your praise. 5 I will bless you all my life; in your name I will lift up my hands. 6 My soul shall be filled as with a banquet; with joyful lips, my mouth shall praise you. 7 When I remember you upon my bed, I muse on you through the watches of the night. 8 For you have been my strength; in the shadow of your wings I rejoice. 9 My soul clings fast to you; your right hand upholds me.	2 O God, you are my God; at dawn I seek you; for you my soul is thirsting. For you my flesh is pining, like a dry, weary land without water. 3 I have come before you in the sanctuary, to behold your strength and your glory. 4 Your loving mercy is better than life; my lips will speak your praise. 5 I will bless you all my life; in your name I will lift up my hands. 6 My soul shall be filled as with a banquet; with joyful lips, my mouth shall praise you. 7 When I remember you upon my bed, I muse on you through the watches of the night. 8 For you have been my strength; in the shadow of your wings I rejoice. 9 My soul clings fast to you; your right hand upholds me.
