= Joseph Lilly =

Joseph L. Lilly, C.M. (1893–1952), was an American Vincentian priest and Scripture scholar. In 1923, he was one of the first editors of The Vincentian.

After his ordination, Lilly pursued Biblical studies. He also completed a doctorate in Sacred Theology at the Pontifical University of Saint Thomas Aquinas. Angelicum in Rome.

Toward the end of his life, together with James Kleist, S.J., he became involved in a project to provide a more modern translation acceptable for Roman Catholics. This was published in 1956 as the Kleist-Lilly translation. It never gained widespread acceptance, however, and was later obscured by the translations being produced by Confraternity of Christian Doctrine, which culminated in the New American Bible in 1970.

At the same time, Lilly was teaching Scripture to the high school students at St. Thomas Seminary, a minor seminary of the Archdiocese of Hartford in Connecticut. In the final years of his life, Lilly was also involved with the Vincentian Motor Missions. This was an ancient practice of the Vincentians, going back to their founder, St. Vincent de Paul, in which they would form itinerant preaching teams, through which the Vincentians would work to bring the Catholic faith to rural and remote areas, additionally allowing their seminarians to hone their preaching skills.

== Works ==
- J. L. Lilly, "The Appearances of the Risen Christ - Alleged Discrepancies in the Gospel Accounts of the Resurrection 1940 p98-111
- The Psalms: a translation and commentary. Author, Joseph L. Lilly. Publisher, St. Thomas seminary, 1941.
- J. A. Kleist (Gospels) and J. L. Lilly (Acts and Epistles), The New Testament (Milwaukee, 1956)
- Motor Missions Scripture Questions 1955, posthumous.
