= Bawlpu =

Medicine man and priest in traditional Mizo village

The Bawlpu is a term to refer to a medicine man in a traditional village of the Mizo people, he was called by the villagers to cure sickness and diseases. He performed rituals and sacrifices to heal the sick through propitiation and exorcism. An animal sacrifice will be made by the Bawlpu as per the requirement after the examination of the sick to cure the disease.

In traditional Mizo belief, evil spirits were believed to cause sickness among human beings. So, anyone who suffered from any illness have to consulted Bawlpu for his intervention to cure by acting as a gobetween evil spirits and human beings.
