= Directory for Masses with Children =

Catholic directive for the liturgy

The Directory for Masses with Children implemented the directive of bishops at the Second Vatican Council to make the Roman Catholic Eucharistic liturgy a more participatory and comprehensible experience for all the faithful. Planning for this directory began at the first Synod of Bishops in Rome in 1967, which entrusted the work to the Congregation for Divine Worship. It was promulgated by Pope Paul VI on November 1, 1973.

== Features ==
=== Introduction ===
The Directory pertains to preadolescent children,(6) presumably under ten, and explains that since children are profoundly formed by the religious experience of infancy and early childhood. we “may fear spiritual harm if over the years children repeatedly experience in the Church things that are barely comprehensible.”(2) Also, speaking of today, “the circumstances in which children grow up are not favorable to their spiritual progress” and some parents are not fulfilling the promises made at their child's baptism.(1)

=== Chapter I ===
Here are listed human values that children should experience in the Eucharistic celebration according to their stage of development: "community activity, exchange of greetings, capacity to listen and to seek and grant pardon, expression of gratitude, experience of symbolic actions, a meal of friendship, and festive celebration."(9) The objective is the same as for adults, "active, conscious, and authentic participation." There is special emphasis on conveying the meaning of the Eucharistic prayer, with the Directory recommending three times that children take part by acclamations of gratitude and praise, including sung acclamations, during the prayer.(12,30,52) In 1974 the International Commission on English in the Liturgy produced three Eucharistic prayers especially for children; two of these have acclamations interspersed throughout the prayer.

=== Chapter II ===
When some children are present at adult Masses, "great care" should be taken that the children not feel neglected. They should be addressed directly at the beginning and end of Mass and at some point in the homily,(17) perhaps have the whole homily addressed to them in a way that adults may also benefit,(19) or might have their own Liturgy of the Word in a nearby room.(17) Also, where the bishop permits, some adaptations described in Chapter III may be employed in adult Masses with children present.(19)

=== Chapter III ===
At children's Masses in which only a few adults participate, “the principles of active and conscious participation are in a sense even more significant.” Suggestions include involving them in the preparation and in ministries during the Mass as much as possible,(22) freer use of introductory comments,(23) and insertion of motives for giving thanks before the priest begins the dialogue of the preface.(22) A suitable adult may be invited to give the homily, and it is noted that a variety of voices helps keep children from becoming bored.(24) Singing, of “great importance in all celebrations, (is) especially encouraged in every way for Masses celebrated with children.”(30) Recorded music may also be used in children's Masses.(32)

The introductory rite should give them a sense of coming together as one community.(40) Introductory comments should precede the readings and help the children to listen better and more fruitfully.(47) In 2013 the United States Conference of Catholic Bishops produced a simplified lectionary covering all Masses with children. "Sometimes the homily intended for children should become a dialogue with them."(48) "If only a single reading is chosen, there may be singing after the homily."(46) Consistent with the General Ritual where the union of voices conveys the deeper meaning of the bread, there should be singing during the communion procession.(54) Before being dismissed the children need a brief repetition and application of what they have heard, expressing the connection between the liturgy and life.(54)

== Resources ==
- Jungmann, JA (1966). "Constitution on the Sacred Liturgy". In Vorgrimler, H (ed.). Commentary on the Documents of Vatican II. Vol. 1. London; Frieiburg: Burns & Oates; Herder & Herder. pp. 1–80.
- "A Second Look at the Directory for Masses with Children". 3 September 2010.
