= Bernardo Hurault =

Biblical scholar and translator

- Born: August 15, 1924; Paris, France
- Died: 14 December 2004; Concepción, Chile
- Organization: Christian Community Bible

Bernardo Hurault (15 August 1924 in Paris – 14 December 2004 in Concepción, Chile) was a French Claretian priest and biblical scholar, and originator of the Christian Community Bible translations.

== Biography ==
Hurault was the priest and translator of the La Biblia Latinoamericana, a work published in 1970 and characterized by accessible language with pastoral notes intended to contextualize details and meanings of the texts of the Bible. La Biblia Latinoamérica has sold over 36 million copies.

Later, in 1986 Hurault relocated to the Philippines and began to supervise translations into English and the native languages of the Philippines. The version appeared in English, then in Tagalog, Cebuano and Ilongo. In 1990, he embarked on the project to publish a version in Chinese, first for those outside China, and then for the people of mainland China. His last years were spent in the Philippines, but he died at eighty years in the city of Concepcion (Chile), on December 14, 2004.
