= Didier Rimaud =

French Jesuit, composer and poet (1922–2003)

- Born: 6 August 1922; Carnac, Brittany, France
- Died: 24 December 2003 (aged 81); Francheville, France
- Education: l’Externat St Joseph; Lycée St Marc
- Occupations: Composer; poet

Didier Rimaud (6 August 1922 – 24 December 2003) was a French Jesuit, poet, composer, musician, hymn writer and translator.

== Early life and education ==
Rimaud was born in Carnac, Brittany on 6 August 1922. He was one of eight children in a military family; his family connections included Emile Rimauld and Bishop Pierre-Marie Belmont.

He studied at l’Externat St Joseph and the Lycée St Marc at Lyon. He became a Jesuit in 1941.

== Career ==
Rimaud wrote several books, including A Force de Colombe - Chantes et Poèmes, Des Grillons et des Anges, Contachanters and Les Psaumes, poèmes de Dieu, prière des hommes.

Rimaud received the prix Broquette-Gonin for literature in 1981.

He also released several albums of music. He collaborated with Jacques Berthier, Joseph Gelineau, Jo Akepsimas and Christian Villeneuve.

He wrote music until the day of his death.

== Death ==
Riamud died on 24 December 2003 in Francheville.
