= James Kleist =

James Aloysius Kleist, S.J. (Zabrze, 1873 -St. Louis, 1949) was a German-born American Jesuit scholar of Koine Greek and patristic literature.

Kleist attended school in Gleiwitz, then Beuthen, and in 1892 entered the novitiate of the Society of Jesus at Bleijenbeek castle in Afferden, the Netherlands, after which he was sent to the United States. For a year he taught at St. Ignatius High School in Cleveland, Ohio. Then, for four years, he lectured to the young Jesuits of the Buffalo Mission of the German Province, Missouri. In 1902, Kleist came to Saint Louis, where he worked on revising Kaegi's 1884 Greek primer.

Kleist joined with Joseph Lilly, C.M., to produce a more modern English translation of the Bible than the Douai Bible then in common usage among Catholics. Under their editorship, the work was laid to produce to the Kleist-Lilly translation, published posthumously in 1954, although work was completed by Christmas 1948. It never gained widespread acceptance, though, and was later totally supplanted by the translations produced by the Confraternity of Christian Doctrine, which culminated in the publication of the New American Bible in 1970.

== Works ==
- A short grammar of classical Greek (1902). Author: Adolf Kaegi 1884, revised James Aloysius Kleist St. Louis, Mo., B. Herder 1902
- The epistles of St. Clement of Rome and St. Ignatius of Antioch 1946
- Classical essays presented to James A. Kleist, S.J., published by The Classical Bulletin (Saint Louis University) 1946.
- Teaching of the Twelve Apostles

Posthumous

- with T. J. Lyman. The Psalms in Rhythmic Prose. 1954.
- J. A. Kleist and J. L. Lilly, The New Testament (Milwaukee, 1954)
- Kleist, JA Psychiatry and Catholicism. VanderVeldt,
