= Gelineau psalmody =

Choral music genre

Gelineau psalmody is a method of singing the Psalms that was developed in France by Catholic Jesuit priest Joseph Gelineau around 1953, with English translations appearing some ten years later. Its chief distinctives are:

- a responsorial structure, with the congregation singing a repeating antiphon between the psalm verses which are sung by a choir or cantor;
- unlike plainchant or Anglican chant, the verses have a regular metre.

== Text ==
Gelineau was himself part of the working group of the French La Bible de Jérusalem and he developed a revised version of that psalter which respected the rhythms of the Hebrew original. This was later translated into English as the Grail Psalms translation of the Psalter.

== Verse ==
The psalm verse uses a "pulsed tone" technique, with a variable number of syllables between the main pulses (barlines). Each line has a prescribed number of accented syllables, even though the total number of syllables varies from line to line. In that sense, it may be regarded as similar to the song Three Blind Mice: each line contains the same number of bars (pulses), but the number of syllables varies from three ("Three blind mice") to eleven "Did ever you see such a thing in your life". But unlike that song, Gelineau insists "the words must never be allowed to fall into set musical rhythmical patterns which are opposed to the natural relative lengths of their syllables when correctly spoken." It is thus a form of sprung rhythm.

== Antiphon ==
Unlike the chant-like verses, the antiphon is more like a short hymn-verse in a regular metre. The tempo of the antiphon is directly related to that of the verse: the one-beat-in-the-bar verse equals the beat unit, typically crotchet (quarter note) or dotted crotchet, of the antiphon. There should be no break between psalm and antiphon: each should follow the other without interruption.

== Recordings ==
- Psalm 23
- Psalm 145
- Psalm 147
- Explanation and exemplification
