= Catholic American Bible =

English-language Catholic Book translation

- Full name: The Catholic American Bible
- Abbreviation: CAB
- Complete Bible published: February 10, 2027 (Anticipated)
- Derived from: New American Bible Revised Edition, Abbey Psalms and Canticles
- Religious affiliation: Catholic Church

The Catholic American Bible (CAB) is an upcoming English translation of the Bible with an anticipated release on February 10, 2027 (Ash Wednesday of that year). The CAB is planned to be the new basis of the Lectionary and Liturgy of the Hours in the United States.

According to Ascension Press, the CAB is planned to include:

- A modified version of the Old Testament from the New American Bible Revised Edition
- The Abbey Psalms and Canticles as the source for the Book of Psalms
- A newly revised New Testament
