= Responsorial psalmody =

Liturgical use of Psalms

Responsorial psalmody primarily refers to the placement and use of the Psalm within the readings at a Christian service of the Eucharist. The Psalm chosen in such a context is often called the responsorial psalm. They are found in the liturgies of several Christian denominations, including those of Catholicism, Lutheranism and Anglicanism.

The "responsorial" aspect is used in two related but different ways: the liturgical position of the psalm as a 'response' to the first (Old Testament) reading, and one possible manner of reciting it. The RSCM summarises these two aspects: "It is responsorial because it is sung in response to the first reading, not because it has a refrain or response for the people to sing. The whole psalm is therefore the response."

== Liturgical position ==
The Catholic Dictionary defines the responsorial psalm as:

Antiphonal psalm that is said or read before the Gospel at Mass. Normally the psalm is taken from the lectionary and has some bearing on the particular text from Scripture. After the second reading and before the Gospel the Alleluia is either sung or read, followed by its appropriate verse. If the Alleluia or the verse before the Gospel is not sung, it may be omitted. Except on Easter Sunday and Whitsunday, the sequences (special festive hymns) are optional.

The New Catholic Encyclopedia points out that not only the psalm but also the gradual and alleluia were also originally 'responsorial' chants. "The title 'responsorial psalm' is not given because there is a response or antiphon for the people to sing. The 'response' referred to is the reflection of the assembly on the proclamation of the reading which just took place."

The use of the psalm "helps the assembly to meditate on and respond to the word that has just been proclaimed". It is for the entire assembly, ordained and lay, congregation and musicians: "The psalm is not only something addressed to the listeners by the cantor, but a prayer addressed to God. In this moment the cantor leads the faithful praying to God, and even the priest or bishop celebrating responds: together all of us gathered in worship praise God through the psalm, and we become the chorus of that prayer through reciting or singing the refrain."

=== History ===
This pattern to the psalm response developed from the early Church. An antiphon or verse was sung by all followed by extended verses of the psalm for the day with an intervening antiphon every so often. Fathers of the Church mentioning this format include Augustine, John Chrysostom and Leo the Great. The responsorial psalm was seen as an integral part of the liturgy with its own significance. This is in contrast to some of the other singing such as the Introit. Originally the deacon was the singer of this psalm and versicle; over time the role moved to the subdeacon then to the choir. The singer did not go all the way to the top of the platform but rather stood on a lower step. This reserved reverence for the subsequent proclamation of the Gospel which alone was proclaimed from the top. The positioning from the step, in Latin gradus, gave rise to the alternative name "gradual". Recent studies indicate that Pope Celestine I introduced responsorial singing after the reading to the Western Church in the early 400s. The role of the congregation in responding to the psalm does not seem to have continued beyond the mid-400s, as more elaborate musical styles could not be performed except by trained choirs.

== Liturgical recitation ==
More usually, the term refers to an antiphonal manner of reciting the psalm, with a choir or cantor and to which the congregation interjects a periodic 'response'. Gelineau psalmody in the Roman Catholic tradition from the 1950s (so pre-dating the Second Vatican Council) describes it thus: "The psalm-verses are then sung by soloist(s) or choir, and after each verse everyone repeats the antiphon (Responsorial or Antiphonal Psalmody)".

The responsorial psalm is the assembly's acclamation of the proclamation of God's Word in our midst: proclamation followed by acclamation.

The refrain can be used in several ways. It can be sung only at the beginning and end of the psalm, allowing a focus for the uninterrupted psalm text. Or it can be sung repetitively through the psalm, after every few verses or where the natural breaks in the psalm text occur.

Eucharistic liturgies consider it normative that the responsorial psalm be sung for three reasons: the genre of the psalms as lyrical compositions; the psalm is a response to the spoken word structure does not customarily respond to speech with more speech; this is the only time in the liturgy when a psalm is used for its own sake and not to accompany a ritual action. The psalm is often sung at the ambo or lectern, because it is, at heart, one of the readings of the Word of God.
