= Scripturae Sacrae affectus =

Apostolic letter from Pope Francis

Scripturae Sacrae affectus Latin for 'Devotion to sacred Scripture' Apostolic letter of Pope Francis
- Signature date: 30 September 2020
- Text: In Latin; In English
- AAS: 112 (10): 855-872

Scripturae Sacrae affectus (Devotion to Sacred Scripture) is an apostolic letter from Pope Francis published on 30 September 2020 to celebrate the 16th centenary of the death of Jerome.

== See also ==
- Verbum Domini
- Vulgate
- Nova Vulgata
- Catholic Bible
