= Cando lucis aeternae =

Apostolic letter issued by Pope Francis

Candor lucis aeternae (Splendor of Light Eternal) is an apostolic letter that was issued by Pope Francis on 25 March 2021. The letter was written in honor of the 700th anniversary of the death of the Italian poet Dante Alighieri and is one of several papal letters to the author, with previous ones having written by Benedict XV, Paul VI, John Paul II, and Benedict XVI.

== Release ==
The apostolic letter was published on 25 March, the date of which coincided with both the Feast of the Annunciation within the Catholic Church and Dante Day (Dantedì) in Italy. To celebrate the anniversary, commemorations were held by the Pontifical Council for Culture, which included a virtual exhibit titled Viaggiare con Dante (Traveling with Dante), a virtual education project on Dante held by the Vatican museums, a Florence conference on the theology of Dante, and more.

Pope Francis wrote the letter to urge others, Catholics and non-Catholics alike, to read Dante's Divine Comedy.

== Content ==
Divided into nine paragraphs, Pope Francis's letter begins with an excursus on the previous Pope's thoughts on Dante, followed by the poet's own life. Francis refers to the Divine Comedy as "an integral part of our culture" and "embodies that patrimony of ideals and values that the Church and civil society continue to propose." Francis also discusses what he sees as the two main pillars within Dante's work, "an innate desire in the human heart" and "fulfilment in the happiness bestowed by the vision of the Love who is God." He also writes on three prominent female figures in the work, Mary, Mother of Jesus, Beatrice Portinari, and Saint Lucy (who represent charity, hope, and faith respectively); as well as the role that Francis of Assisi (who the pontiff chose his name in honor of) plays in the poem.
