= Life: My Story Through History =

2024 autobiography by Pope Francis

- Author: Pope Francis
- Audio read by: Stephen Colbert
- Genre: Autobiography
- Published: 2024
- Publisher: HarperOne
- ISBN: 9780063387522

Life: My Story Through History is a 2024 autobiography by Pope Francis.
