= Joseph Gelineau =

Roman Catholic priest and composer

Joseph Gelineau, S.J., (31 October 1920 – 8 August 2008) was a French Jesuit priest and composer, mainly of modern Christian liturgical music. He was a member of the translation committee for La Bible de Jérusalem (1959).

Gelineau was born in Champ-sur-Layon, Maine-et-Loire. Having entered the Society of Jesus in 1941, he studied Catholic theology in Lyon and music in Paris. He was one of the founders of the international study group on music and liturgy Universa Laus.

Heavily influenced by Gregorian chant, he developed his Gelineau psalmody which is used worldwide. His psalm tones were designed to express the asymmetrical, three to four line design of the psalm texts. He collaborated with the Dominican Raymond-Jacques Tournay and Raymond Schwab to rework the Jerusalem Bible Psalter. Their joint effort produced the Psautier de la Bible de Jerusalem and recording Psaumes, which won the Gran Prix de L' Academie Charles Cros in 1953. Later he composed numerous chants for the ecumenical French Taizé Community. He was associated with the Institut Catholique de Paris.

He also collaborated with Didier Rimaud.

He died in Sallanches, aged 87.

== Selected recordings ==
- Hymnes de Joseph Gelineau 4CD, Studio SM
- Psaumes de Joseph Gelineau 4CD, Studio SM
- Psalms: A New Way Of Singing, vinyl album, Grail, UK
