= Verbum Domini =

2010 apostolic exhortation by Pope Benedict XVI

Verbum Domini Latin for 'The Word of the Lord' Apostolic exhortation of Pope Benedict XVI
- Signature date: 30 September 2010
- Number: 2 of 4 of the pontificate
- Text: In English

Verbum Domini (The Word of the Lord) is a post-synodal apostolic exhortation issued by Pope Benedict XVI which deals with how the Catholic church should approach the Bible. He issued it following the XII Ordinary General Assembly of the Synod of Bishops, which had met in October 2008 to discuss "The Word of God in the Life and Mission of the Church".

Verbum Domini is dated September 30, 2010, the feast of St. Jerome, the patron saint of biblical studies.

The document has been seen as a development of the Second Vatican Council's Dogmatic Constitution on Divine Revelation (Dei verbum). It uses the Prologue of John's Gospel (John 1:1–1:18) as a guide because it reveals Jesus, the "Word made flesh" who "dwelt among us" (John 1:14).

The apostolic exhortation states that God seeks dialogue with humankind. In the Incarnation, the Word became flesh and lived among us.

== See also ==
- Scripturae sacrae affectus
