= ICEL Psalter =

1995 translation of the Book of Psalms

The ICEL Psalter is a 20th-century translation of the Book of Psalms, translated by the International Commission on English in the Liturgy (ICEL). The psalter was published by Liturgical Training Publications in 1995 with the imprimatur of Cardinal William Henry Keeler. The approval of Keeler, the president of the United States Conference of Catholic Bishops, paved the way for its use in Roman Catholic liturgy in the US.

Because of controversies surrounding ICEL's use of dynamic equivalence and gender-inclusive language, by order of Cardinal Joseph Ratzinger, who later became Pope Benedict XVI, the imprimatur was revoked in 1998 by Bishop Anthony Pilla.
