= Sprung rhythm =

Poetic rhythm mimicking natural speech

Sprung rhythm is a poetic rhythm designed to imitate the rhythm of natural speech, and in which the number of unstressed syllables in each foot can vary. The British poet Gerard Manley Hopkins said he discovered this previously unnamed poetic rhythm in the natural patterns of English in folk songs, spoken poetry, Shakespeare, Milton, et al. He used diacritical marks on syllables to indicate which should be stressed in cases "where the reader might be in doubt which syllable should have the stress" (acute, e.g. shéer) and which syllables should be pronounced but not stressed (grave, e.g., gleanèd).

Some critics believe he merely coined a name for poems with mixed, irregular feet, like free verse. However, while sprung rhythm allows for an indeterminate number of syllables to a foot, Hopkins was very careful to keep the number of feet per line consistent across each individual work, a trait that free verse does not share. Sprung rhythm may be classed as a form of accentual verse, as it is stress-timed, rather than syllable-timed, and while sprung rhythm did not become a popular literary form, Hopkins's advocacy did assist in a revival of accentual verse more generally.

== See also ==
- Grail Psalms
