= Confraternity Bible =

Editions of the Catholic Bible

- Full name: The Holy Bible - Confraternity Version
- Abbreviation: CB
- Language: Modern English
- NT published: 1941
- Authorship: Members of the Catholic Biblical Association of America
- Derived from: Douay Rheims Bible compared with the Greek biblical manuscripts
- Religious affiliation: Catholic Church
- Genesis 1:1–3 In the beginning God created the heavens and the earth; the earth was waste and void; darkness covered the abyss, and the spirit of God was stirring above the waters. God said, "Let there be light," and there was light. God saw that the light was good. John 3:16 For God so loved the world that he gave his only-begotten Son, that those who believe in him may not perish, but may have life everlasting.

The Confraternity Bible is an edition of the Catholic Bible translated under the auspices of the Confraternity of Christian Doctrine (CCD) between 1941 and 1969.

== Description ==
The Confraternity Bible was created to replace the standard English-language Bible for Catholics at the time, the Douay-Rheims, which dated from the late 16th and early 17th centuries and had been extensively updated by Bishop Richard Challoner in the mid 18th century. The aim of the Confraternity version was to update the Bible into "intelligible, modern English". The translation was done by members of the Catholic Biblical Association of America, and sponsored by the Confraternity of Christian Doctrine, which is where the name "Confraternity Bible" originates. Initially, the Bible was simply a modern English translation of the Latin Vulgate, and the New Testament was completed this way and published in 1941.

However, in 1943, Pope Pius XII published the encyclical Divino Afflante Spiritu, which stated future translations were to be made from the original languages, not just the Vulgate. As a result, when the Old Testament began to be published in 1952, the translations had been made from the Hebrew Masoretic Text. The Old Testament was finally finished in 1969. The next year those translations were incorporated into the New American Bible, paired with a new translation of the New Testament and book of Genesis.

== Publication history ==
Volumes were released serially by St. Anthony Guild Press in New Jersey as they were completed. Their publishing history is as follows:

- The Book of Genesis – 1948: this was a unique translation, the only one that was revised for the 1970 NAB
- The Book of Psalms – 1950 and 1955, reprinted 1959
- The Octateuch: Genesis to Ruth – 1952 (published as Volume One)
- The Sapiential Books (Job to Sirach) – 1955 (published as Volume Three — with Volume Two left to be filled in later)
- The Prophetic Books (Isaias to Malachias) – 1961 (published as Volume Four)
- The Historical Books – Samuel to Maccabees (1 Samuel to Esther; 1 and 2 Maccabees) – 1969 (published as Volume Two)

Because of the hybrid nature of the various printings of the Confraternity Bible, it has been referred to as the "Douay-Confraternity Bible", referencing the fact that the Old Testament section was made up partly of books from the Challoner-Douay Old Testament and partly from books translated or revised by the CCD Publishers released "Confraternity Bibles" up to 1969, always indicating to what extent they featured Confraternity translations of the Old Testament. They typically included some variation on the following description of the edition's Old Testament contents: "With the New Confraternity of Christian Doctrine Translation of the First Eight Books, the Seven Sapiential Books, and the Eighteen Prophetic Books of the Old Testament. The balance is in the Douay Version."

== See also ==
- Council of Trent
