= Catholic Biblical Association =

Society for academic study of the Bible

Catholic Biblical Association of America
- Abbreviation: CBA
- Formation: 1936; 90 years ago
- Founded at: New York City, US
- Headquarters: Washington, D.C., US
- Members: 1,200 (2011)
- President: Amy-Jill Levine
- Chair of the board: Harold W. Attridge
- Executive director: Archie Wright
- Website: catholicbiblical.org

The Catholic Biblical Association of America (CBA) is an American learned society dedicated to the academic study of the Bible. The suggestion to form a permanent association of biblical scholars was made at the beginning of 1936 at a meeting in Washington, D.C., held to plan for the preparation of a revised translation of the New Testament. The proposed organization was formally founded, as "The Catholic Biblical Association of America", by some fifty charter members who met for this purpose in New York City on October 3, 1936, and is not affiliated with the Catholic Church or made up of exclusively Catholic members. Membership now numbers more than 1,200. Those who hold an advanced degree in biblical studies are eligible to be elected to membership, irrespective of any religious affiliation. Since 1939, the CBA has published the Catholic Biblical Quarterly, a peer-reviewed academic journal. Other publications include Old Testament Abstracts and the Catholic Biblical Quarterly Monograph Series.

== NAB New Testament Revision Project ==
In 2012, the United States Conference of Catholic Bishops (USCCB) "announced a plan to revise the New Testament of the New American Bible Revised Edition so a single version can be used for individual prayer, catechesis and liturgy." The USCCB approved the initiation of a revision of the New American Bible New Testament (NAB NT) and entrusted the work to the Confraternity of Christian Doctrine (CCD). After they developed a plan and budget for the revision project, work began in 2013 with the creation of an editorial board made up of five people from the Catholic Biblical Association (CBA), to which additional members of the revision team were added in 2014. Once approved by the bishops and the Vatican, the revised NAB will serve as a single translation for use in the liturgy, for study, and for catechism. The work is expected to be completed around 2025.

== See also ==
- Confraternity Bible
