= Confraternity of Christian Doctrine =

Religious education programs of the Catholic Church normally designed for children

The Confraternity of Christian Doctrine (CCD) is an association established in Rome in 1562 for the purpose of providing religious education. The abbreviated name is colloquially used for the catechesis or religious education program of the Catholic Church, normally designed for children.

== Background ==
In the thirteenth century, the Apostles' Creed and the Lord's Prayer formed the general basis of religious instruction. All the faithful within the Catholic Church were required to know them by heart, and parish priests were commanded to explain them on Sundays and festivals. Eventually, the range of instruction was widened to include the Commandments, the sacraments, and the virtues and vices.

In 1281 the Synod of Lambeth, England, ordered priests to explain these truths of faith four times a year. The Provincial Council of Lavours, France, in 1368, expanded this and commanded priests to give instruction on all Sundays and feast days. This council also published a catechism to serve as a textbook for the clergy in giving instructions in Christian doctrine, which was followed in all the dioceses of Languedoc and Gascony. Similar manuals were published elsewhere.

Partly in response to the challenge to uniformity posed by the Reformation, the Council of Trent stated that church reform must begin with the religious instruction of the young. The Council issued the "Catechismus ad Parochos" and decreed that, throughout the Church, instructions in Christian doctrine should be given on Sundays and festivals.

== History ==
In 1536, the Abbot Castellino da Castello had inaugurated a system of Sunday schools in Milan. Around 1560, a wealthy Milanese nobleman, Marco de Sadis-Cusani, having established himself in Rome, was joined by a number of zealous associates, both priests and laymen, and pledged to instruct both children and adults in Christian doctrine. In 1562, Pope Pius IV made the Church of Sant' Apollinare their central institution; but they also gave instructions in schools, in the streets and lanes, and even in private houses. As the association grew, it divided into two sections: the priests formed themselves into a religious congregation, the Fathers of Christian Doctrine, while the laymen remained in the world as "The Confraternity of Christian Doctrine".

Encouragement from the Holy See was quickly forthcoming. In 1571, Pope Pius V, in the Brief Ex debito pastoralis officii, recommended that bishops establish it in every parish. In 1607, Pope Paul V, by the Papal Brief Ex credito nobis, erected it into an archconfraternity, with St. Peter's Basilica in Rome as its headquarters. In 1686, a rescript of the Sacred Congregation of Indulgences urged its establishment wherever possible.

From Rome it spread rapidly over Italy, France and Germany. It found advocates in Robert Bellarmine and Francis de Sales, and Charles Borromeo established it in every parish of his diocese.

Pope Pius X was a strong proponent of CCD. In 1905, in his letter Acerbo nimis, he mandated the establishment of the Confraternity of Christian Doctrine (catechism class) in every parish.

The First Provincial Council of Westminster urged that its members should be used in both Sunday and day-schools.

If the central confraternity in a diocese is affiliated to the Archconfraternity of Santa Maria del Pianto in Rome, all others participate in all the confraternity indulgences.

== Similar groups ==
Similar in scope and character to the CCD are the Pieuses Unions de la Doctrine Chrétienne, founded by the Sisters of Perpetual Adoration at Brussels in 1851, for giving religious instruction to boys and girls. In Brussels, they were (as of 1913) found in about thirty parishes. In 1894, Pope Leo XIII erected it into an archconfraternity for Belgium.

The Archconfraternity of Voluntary Catechists (loosely corresponding to the French Oeuvre des Catéchismes) was founded to help parish priests in giving religious instructions to children attending the primary schools in Paris and other parts of France, after these had been laicized. In 1893, Pope Leo XIII gave it the rank of an archconfraternity with power to affiliate all similar confraternities in France. The indulgences granted to all these confraternities are numerous.

In 1902, the Confraternity of Christian Doctrine was established in the Archdiocese of New York by Archbishop Michael A. Corrigan, as proposed by Marion Gurney, who was its first secretary.

== Contemporary usage ==
The Confraternity of Christian Doctrine is now commonly referred to by its abbreviation, CCD, or simply as "Catechism", and provides religious education to Catholic children attending secular schools. Inconsistently, CCD has also been offered under a spectrum of banners and acronyms, but all serve the same parochial function of providing a course of study that has been pre-approved by the diocese as meeting the requirements for children not enrolled in a Catholic school (i.e., public school students) to engage with the sacraments at the same time as their diocese-sponsored peers.

While CCD remains the official shorthand of the institution, occasionally parishes have opted to style their individual program as PSR (Parish School of Religion), SRE (Special Religious Education), and PRP (Parish Religious Program), especially when it occurs as a condensed extended-day summer program.

Similar to children's Sunday schools in Protestant churches, CCD education is provided by both members of the clergy and lay staff. Unlike Protestant Sunday programs, CCD does not afford participating children an excuse from the weekend Mass they attend with their family unit. Catholic culture in America often necessitates or at least prefers that instructors hold credentials in education, ministry, or both, in addition to professing that one lives in strict adherence to church teaching and customs. CCD attendance is considered by the Holy See to be vital to children's development as Catholics and an important complement to the limited liturgic participation they regularly experience while accompanying their family to church throughout the year. These classes not only educate children about Jesus and the Catholic faith but more practically prepare children to fully participate in adult spiritual life by providing a secure foundation to receive the sacraments of Penance (confession), the Eucharist (Holy Communion), and Confirmation.

Organisations called Confraternity of Christian Doctrine have been established in many countries and organise modern CCD programs.

The national Confraternity of Christian Doctrine in the United States is a non-profit subsidiary of the United States Conference of Catholic Bishops based in Washington, DC. It notably owns the copyright on the New American Bible, the translation incorporated in the lectionary for Mass used in the United States. The organization operates an international grant-funding program in conjunction with the Catholic Biblical Association, using royalties to support "Catholic biblical literacy and Catholic biblical interpretation".

== See also ==
- Catholic spirituality
- Confraternity Bible
- New American Bible
