= International Commission on English in the Liturgy =

The International Commission on English in the Liturgy (ICEL) is a commission set up by a number of Catholic episcopal conferences of English-speaking countries for the purpose of providing English translations of the liturgical books of the Roman Rite, the originals of which are in Latin.

Decisions to adopt these translations are made by the episcopal conference of the country concerned, and these decisions are reviewed by the Holy See before being put into effect.

== Constitution ==
Bishops from English-speaking countries who were in Rome for the Second Vatican Council set up the Commission in 1963 in view of their intention to implement the Council's authorization to use more extensively the vernacular language, instead of Latin, in the liturgy. On 15 September 2003, ICEL was formally established as a mixed commission of several bishops conferences in accordance with the Congregation for Divine Worship's instruction Liturgiam authenticam (2001).

Eleven bishops conferences are full members of ICEL, each of them represented by a bishop. Those full members of ICEL are the conferences of Australia, Canada, England and Wales, India, Ireland, New Zealand, Pakistan, the Philippines, Scotland, South Africa, and the United States of America. Another 15 are associate members: those of the Antilles, Bangladesh, CEPAC (Pacific islands), Gambia - Liberia - Sierra Leone, Ghana, Kenya, Malaysia - Singapore, Malawi, Nigeria, Papua New Guinea and Solomon Islands, Sri Lanka, Tanzania, Uganda, Zambia, and Zimbabwe. The eleven member bishops are assisted by the ICEL secretariat in Washington, which coordinates the work of specialists throughout the world who work on preparing translations.

== Work done ==
Liturgical books that have appeared in ICEL translations (some of which have been superseded) include:

The Roman Missal, and some supplementary texts such as the Simple Gradual, and Eucharistic Prayers for Masses with Children
Parts of the Roman Ritual: rites for the sacraments whose administration is not reserved for bishops, funerals, religious profession, etc.
Parts of the Roman Pontifical: the rites of confirmation and ordination, blessing of a church and altar, consecration to a life of virginity, etc.
Parts of the Liturgy of the Hours. The ICEL Psalter was rejected, and published editions of the Liturgy of the Hours use instead the 1983 Grail Psalter. Even the ICEL elements used in the United States edition of the Liturgy of the Hours were not accepted by other episcopal conferences, which preferred to authorize a different translation.
The Ceremonial of Bishops
The Roman Martyrology has not yet been translated into English.
In late 2013, work was proceeding on:
- The Order of Confirmation
- The Order of Celebrating Marriage
- The Order of Dedication of a Church and an Altar
- Exorcisms and Certain Supplications
- Supplement to the Liturgy of the Hours

Once translations have been drafted by ICEL, an initial version known as a "Green Book" is issued to bishops for review and comment. In the light of their comments, a further edition, a "Grey Book" is issued, on which the bishops vote. Once voting is complete, the text is submitted to the Congregation for Divine Worship for approval.

== Roman Missal ==
Of all the books that ICEL translated, the Roman Missal is the one that Catholics in general are most familiar with. The first translation that ICEL produced appeared in 1973, less than four years after the Latin original had appeared. In keeping with the 1969 Vatican instruction on translation Comme le prévoit, it was not a literal translation of the Latin texts but sought what has come to be called "dynamic equivalence", capturing the meaning of the prayer but avoiding technical terms: "no special literary training should be required of the people; liturgical texts should normally be intelligible to all, even to the less educated". The resulting English translation of the Roman Missal (called Sacramentary in the United States) received wide acceptance, but was also criticized for straying too far from the Latin originals and for occasional banality in the language.

By 1998, ICEL completed a new version in English of the Roman Missal. This translation included richer translations of the Latin texts, but it also included original compositions prepared by ICEL, particularly alternative collects based on the Sunday Lectionary, an alternative contemporary form of the Easter Proclamation (Exsultet), variant texts in the Order of Mass, and some options in the rubrics, particularly around the celebration of weekday Masses. This new translation was approved by all the bishops' conferences that were members of ICEL and was submitted to the Congregation of Divine Worship for confirmation, as required by canon law. The Congregation, whose work on a new edition of the Roman Missal in Latin was already well advanced – part of it was published in 2000 and the entire volume in 2002 – refused its consent for adoption of the proposed new English version based on the earlier Latin edition.

On 28 March 2001, the Congregation for Divine Worship issued the Instruction Liturgiam authenticam, which included the requirement that, in translations of the liturgical texts from the official Latin originals, "the original text, insofar as possible, must be translated integrally and in the most exact manner, without omissions or additions in terms of their content, and without paraphrases or glosses. Any adaptation to the characteristics or the nature of the various vernacular languages is to be sober and discreet." In the following year, the third typical edition of the revised Roman Missal in Latin was released. These two texts made clear the need for a new official English translation of the Roman Missal, particularly because even the 1973 ICEL version was at some points an adaptation rather than a translation. An example was the rendering of the response "Et cum spiritu tuo" ("And with your spirit") as "And also with you".

To correspond with the demands of the Congregation for Divine Worship, there was a change in the leadership of the ICEL in 2002. After this ICEL prepared a new English translation of the Roman Missal, which followed the principle of "formal equivalence" mandated by Liturgiam Authenticam. The completed translation received the approval of the Holy See in April 2010 and was put into effect in most countries at the end of November 2011. Before and after its implementation, this translation generated controversy both because of its language and syntax, and because of the process by which it was prepared.

== Chairmen ==
List of Chairmen of the ICEL
No.	Chairman	Dates	Notes
1	Francis Joseph Grimshaw	(d. 1965)	Archbishop of Birmingham, England and Wales
2	Paul John Hallinan	(d. 1968)	Archbishop of Atlanta, United States
3	Gordon Gray		Archbishop of St. Andrews and Edinburgh, Scotland
4	Emmett Carter		Archbishop of Toronto, Canada
5	Denis Hurley	1975–1991	Archbishop of Durban, South Africa
6	Daniel Edward Pilarczyk	1991–1997	Archbishop of Cincinnati, United States
7	Maurice Taylor	1997–2002	Bishop of Galloway, Scotland
8	Arthur Roche	2002–2012	Bishop of Leeds, England and Wales
9	Arthur J. Serratelli	2012–2019	Bishop of Paterson, United States
10	Hugh Gilbert	2019–present	Bishop of Aberdeen, Scotland

== See also ==
- English Language Liturgical Consultation
