= Liturgiam authenticam =

2001 Roman Catholic document

Liturgiam authenticam (titled: De usu linguarum popularium in libris liturgiae Romanae edendis (Note: English: On the Use of Vernacular Languages in the Publication of the Roman Liturgy)) is an instruction of the Congregation for Divine Worship and the Discipline of the Sacraments, dated 28 March 2001.

This instruction included the requirement that, in translations of the liturgical texts or of the Bible, "the original text, insofar as possible, must be translated integrally and in the most exact manner, without omissions or additions in terms of their content, and without paraphrases or glosses. Any adaptation to the characteristics or the nature of the various vernacular languages is to be sober and discreet." (n. 20)

== Content ==
=== Use of the Nova Vulgata ===
Liturgiam authenticam established the Nova Vulgata as "the point of reference as regards the delineation of the canonical text". Concerning the translation of liturgical texts, the instruction states:

Furthermore, in the preparation of these translations for liturgical use, the Nova Vulgata Editio, promulgated by the Apostolic See, is normally to be consulted as an auxiliary tool, in a manner described elsewhere in this Instruction, in order to maintain the tradition of interpretation that is proper to the Latin Liturgy. [...] [I]t is advantageous to be guided by the Nova Vulgata wherever there is a need to choose, from among various possibilities [of translation], that one which is most suited for expressing the manner in which a text has traditionally been read and received within the Latin liturgical tradition

However, the instruction specifies (n. 24) that translations should not be made from the Nova Vulgata, but "must be made directly from the original texts, namely the Latin, as regards the texts of ecclesiastical composition, or the Hebrew, Aramaic, or Greek, as the case may be, as regards the texts of Sacred Scripture". Therefore, the instruction does not recommend a translation of the Bible or of the liturgy based upon the Latin Nova Vulgata; the Nova Vulgata must simply be used as an "auxiliary tool" (n. 24).

== Reactions ==
The American Catholic Biblical Association reacted negatively to the publication of the instruction. In reaction to this, Cardinal Medina wrote in Notitiae to answer criticisms and misunderstandings concerning the instruction.

Bruce Harbert, a former executive secretary of ICEL, considered the instruction a "courageous document on texts", saying that "It's not easy to write prescriptively on language, but I thought it did so very well. The time had come when some guidance had to be given."

Following the publication of Liturgiam authenticam, a revised translation of the Roman Missal was published in 2010.

In 2005, the Protestant Church of Germany withdrew from an ecumenical Bible translation project due to concern that Liturgiam authenticam was fundamentally irreconcilable with Protestant goals in Biblical translation.

== Later developments ==
In December 2016, Pope Francis authorized a commission to study Liturgiam authenticam.

== See also ==
- Magnum principium
- Mass of Paul VI § Revision of the English translation
- Nova Vulgata
