= Dei verbum =

Catholic Dogmatic Constitution on Divine Revelation

Dei verbum, the Second Vatican Council's Dogmatic Constitution on Divine Revelation, was promulgated by Pope Paul VI on 18 November 1965, following approval by the assembled bishops by a vote of 2,344 to 6. It is one of the principal documents of the Second Vatican Council.

The phrase "Dei verbum" is Latin for "Word of God" and is taken from the first line of the document, as is customary for titles of major Catholic documents.

== History ==
An initial Schema Constitutionis Dogmaticae de Fontibus Revelationis ("On the Sources of Revelation") was prepared by the Council's Preparatory Theological Commission before a period of world-wide consultation led to the formation of a draft for the bishops to consider. A subcommission of the Preparatory Theological Commission was appointed to prepare the draft, which was finalised after discussions during November 1961 and approved by Pope John XXIII in July 1962. Joseph Ratzinger, then one of the periti or expert advisors, but later Pope Benedict XVI, privately objected to the "negative tone" of the draft document and its lack [of] theological finesse". The final version of the Constitution was promulgated by Pope Paul VI on 18 November 1965.

== Contents ==
=== Preface ===
The preface links the document to its biblical foundations (quoting 1 John 1:2-3) and to the work of two earlier Councils, the Council of Trent (1545-63) (Note: The Council of Trent established a definitive list of which books form part of the scriptural canon, affirmed God as their ultimate "author", fixed the Latin Vulgate as the Catholic Church's primary text, and specified that the Church was the "definitive interpreter" of biblical meaning. Trent did not address "revelation" as a topic as such.) and the First Vatican Council (1869-70).

=== Revelation, sacred tradition and sacred Scripture ===
Chapter I deals with "Revelation itself", while Chapter II deals with the "handing on" of this revelation.

In Chapter II, section 7 refers to the revelation of the Gospel, encountered by the first apostles in hearing Jesus speak and "living with him". This section refers to "the apostles and apostolic men" (Latin: Apostolis virisque apostolicis), without defining who they were. (Note: Cf. "[the] apostles and other men associated with the apostles" in the Catechism of the Catholic Church.)

Further, under the heading "Handing On Divine Revelation", the Constitution states among other points:

Hence there exists a close connection and communication between sacred Tradition and sacred Scripture. For both of them, flowing from the same divine wellspring, in a certain way merge into a unity and tend toward the same end. For Sacred Scripture is the word of God inasmuch as it is consigned to writing under the inspiration of the divine Spirit, while sacred tradition takes the word of God entrusted by Christ the Lord and the Holy Spirit to the Apostles, and hands it on to their successors in its full purity, so that led by the light of the Spirit of truth, they may in proclaiming it preserve this word of God faithfully, explain it, and make it more widely known. Consequently it is not from Sacred Scripture alone that the Church draws her certainty about everything which has been revealed. Therefore both sacred tradition and Sacred Scripture are to be accepted and venerated with the same sense of loyalty and reverence.

The Word of God is transmitted both through the canonical texts of Sacred Scripture, and through Sacred Tradition, which includes various forms such as liturgy, prayers, and the teachings of the Apostles and their successors. The Church looks to Tradition as a protection against errors that could arise from private interpretation.

=== Interpretation of sacred Scripture ===
The teaching of the Magisterium on the interpretation of Scripture was summarized in paragraph 12, expressly devoted to biblical interpretation and the task of the interpreter. Avery Dulles observed that Dei Verbum distinguished between two levels of meaning, the literal sense intended by the biblical writers and the further understanding that may be attained due to context within the whole of Scripture.

=== The Old Testament ===
In Chapter IV (paragraphs 14-16), Dei verbum affirms the saying of Augustine that "the New Testament is hidden in the Old, and that the Old Testament is manifest in the New" (paragraph 16). (Note: The Council's consideration of the Old Testament is significantly extended in the Pontifical Biblical Commission's The Jewish People and their Sacred Scriptures in the Christian Bible, published in 2002.)

=== The New Testament ===
Chapter V (paragraphs 17-20) covers the New Testament, especially the four gospels, which are "of apostolic origin" and "have a special preeminence" within sacred scripture.

=== Sacred Scripture in the Life of the Church ===
Finally, the Council directs that "easy access to Sacred Scripture should be provided for all the Christian faithful". Treasured translations include the Greek Septuagint translation of the Old Testament, which the church has "accepted as her own", and the Latin Vulgate, but the objective of accessibility requires that "suitable and correct translations are made into different languages, especially from the original texts of the sacred books". Approved ecumenical cooperation on biblical translation is to be commended.

Frequent reading of the divine Scriptures is encouraged for all the Christian faithful, together with the guidance that prayer should accompany the reading of Sacred Scripture, "so that God and man may talk together". Some are ordained to preach the Word, while others reveal Christ in the way they live and interact in the world.

== Scholarly opinion ==
The schema, or draft document, prepared for the first council session (October–December 1962) reflected the conservative theology of the Holy Office, led by Cardinal Alfredo Ottaviani. Pope John intervened directly to promote instead the preparation of a new draft which was assigned to a mixed commission of conservatives and progressives, and it was this on which the final document was based. Wording in the first draft, which alluded to the several or "double" sources of revelation, was removed the final document, where the term "divine revelation" points to revelation having only one "source".

The doctrines of Dei verbum bear a striking similarity to the writings of St. John Henry Newman in An Essay on the Development of Christian Doctrine. Dei verbum espouses Newman's concept of the "development of doctrine", writing "there is a growth in the understanding of the realities and the words which have been handed down. This happens through the contemplation and study made by believers, who treasure these things in their hearts." For his contributions to Dei verbum and many other parts of Vatican II, Pope Paul VI called it "Newman's Council". Dennis Hamm has also identified Pope Leo XIII's encyclical letter Providentissimus Deus, Pius XII's Divino Afflante Spiritu, and a document issued shortly before the Council by the Pontifical Biblical Commission, Sancta Mater Ecclesia: An instruction on the Truth of the Gospels (21 April 1964) as other doctrinal writings which had "contributed conspicuously" to the formation of the ideas expressed in the constitution.

The final draft was also significantly influenced by the work of the Dominican theologian Yves Congar, who had been appointed a peritus at the council.

Joseph Ratzinger identified three overall themes in Dei verbum:

1. the new view of the phenomenon of tradition;
2. the theological problem of the application of critical historical methods to the interpretation of Scripture; and
3. the biblical movement that had been growing from the turn of the twentieth century.

Regarding article 1 of the preface of Dei verbum, Ratzinger wrote: "The brief form of the Preface and the barely concealed illogicalities that it contains betray clearly the confusion from which it has emerged."

== Biblical infallibility and inerrancy ==
The Catechism states that "the books of Scripture firmly, faithfully, and without error teach that truth which God, for the sake of our salvation, wished to see confided to the Sacred Scriptures."

Nevertheless, the Catechism clearly states that

the Christian faith is not a "religion of the book". Christianity is the religion of the "Word" of God, "not a written and mute word, but incarnate and living". If the Scriptures are not to remain a dead letter, Christ, the eternal Word of the living God, must, through the Holy Spirit, "open (our) minds to understand the Scriptures."

The Catechism goes on to state that

In Sacred Scripture, God speaks to man in a human way. To interpret Scripture correctly, the reader must be attentive to what the human authors truly wanted to affirm, and to what God wanted to reveal to us by their words.

[...]

But since Sacred Scripture is inspired, there is another and no less important principle of correct interpretation, without which Scripture would remain a dead letter. "Sacred Scripture must be read and interpreted in the light of the same Spirit by whom it was written."

There was a controversy during the Council on whether the Roman Catholic Church taught biblical infallibility or biblical inerrancy. Some have interpreted Dei verbum as teaching the infallibility position, while others note that the conciliar document often quotes previous documents such as Providentissimus Deus and Divino afflante Spiritu that suggest inerrancy.

== See also ==
- Divino afflante Spiritu
- Verbum Domini
