= Divino afflante Spiritu =

1943 papal encyclical letter issued by Pope Pius XII

Divino afflante Spiritu Latin for '[By] the divine inspiration of the Spirit' Encyclical of Pope Pius XII
- Signature date: 30 September 1943
- Subject: On Sacred Scripture
- Number: 5 of 41 of the pontificate
- Text: In English
- AAS: 35 (10): 297-325

Divino afflante Spiritu (English: "[By] the divine inspiration of the Spirit" ) is a papal encyclical letter issued by Pope Pius XII on 30 September 1943 calling for new translations of the Bible into vernacular languages, using the original languages as a source instead of the Latin Vulgate.

Catholic biblical scholar Raymond E. Brown, SS, described Divino afflante Spiritu as a "Magna Carta for biblical progress".

== Context ==
The Vulgate, made mostly by Jerome, had formed the textual basis for all Catholic vernacular translations of the Bible until Pius XII's encyclical. Divino afflante Spiritu inaugurated the modern period of Roman Catholic biblical studies by encouraging the study of textual criticism (or 'lower criticism'), pertaining to text of the Scriptures themselves and transmission thereof (for example, to determine correct readings) and permitted the use of the historical-critical method (or 'higher criticism'), to be informed by theology, Sacred Tradition, and ecclesiastical history on the historical circumstances of the text, hypothesizing about matters such as authorship, dating, and similar concerns.

== Content ==
The encyclical appeared on the feast of Jerome to commemorate the 50th anniversary of Pope Leo XIII's 1893 encyclical Providentissimus Deus. With Providentissimus Deus, Pope Leo gave the first formal authorization for the use of critical methods in biblical scholarship.

Previously, Catholic translations of the Bible into modern languages were usually based on the Latin Vulgate, the text used in the Liturgy. They generally referred back to the source texts (in Biblical Hebrew, Biblical Aramaic and Biblical Greek) only to clarify the exact meaning of the Latin text.

In his encyclical, Pius stressed the importance of diligent study of the original languages and other cognate languages to arrive at a deeper and fuller knowledge of the meaning of the sacred texts:

We ought to explain the original text which was written by the inspired author himself and has more authority and greater weight than any, even the very best, translation whether ancient or modern. This can be done all the more easily and fruitfully if to the knowledge of languages be joined a real skill in literary criticism of the same text.

It is likely that in the detailed presentation of the work of textual criticism, Pius was sharing what he had learned from the expertise of his confessor, the Jesuit priest Augustin Bea, rector of the Pontifical Biblical Institute and a professor of textual criticism.

== See also ==
- Afflatus
- Dei verbum
- École Biblique
