= Saint Benedict Press =

Saint Benedict Press, LLC
- Parent company: Goodwill Publishers
- Founded: 2006
- Country of origin: United States
- Headquarters location: Gastonia, North Carolina
- Key people: Conor Gallagher (President/CEO)
- Publication types: Books, Booklets, DVDs
- Nonfiction topics: Catholicism
- Imprints: Catholic Courses; Catholic Scripture Study International; Basilica Press
- Official website: www.saintbenedictpress.com

Saint Benedict Press, LLC is a Catholic publisher founded in Charlotte, North Carolina, in 2006, now operating in Gastonia. It is a division of Goodwill Publishers.

== History ==
The Saint Benedict Press Classics line began in 2006, starting with public domain classic Catholic titles as a direct competitor against TAN Books and Publishers. The Catechism of the Council of Trent, The Life of Our Lord Jesus Christ four volume set, Come Rack, Come Rope, Dark Night of the Soul, Dialogue of Saint Catherine of Siena, Way of Divine Life and the Rule of Saint Benedict were among the first titles produced. In addition to the public domain titles, SBP published four versions of the New American Bible.

In 2008, SBP acquired TAN Books out of bankruptcy. In July 2009, TAN relocated from Rockford, Illinois, to a new facility in Charlotte. Although wholly owned by SBP, TAN is marketed as a sister publisher to SBP, with its own line of imprints.

Since the acquisition of TAN Books and its catalog of classic titles, Saint Benedict Press has focused a significant portion of its own imprint's product line on books written by living authors. Critics from different philosophies have given positive responses to the new works. The progressive Catholic publication National Catholic Reporter said the book The Abbess of Andalusia provided insight to Flannery O'Connor's Catholicism. National Review gave positive reviews to both The Essential Belloc (co-edited by the Opus Dei priest C. John McCloskey) and The Mystery of Predestination by apologist John Salza. Inside Catholic discussed the evidence of Purgatory presented in the book Hungry Souls.

== Imprints ==
- Saint Benedict Press: Publishes works by contemporary authors on a variety of Catholic subjects from an orthodox perspective, as well as a line of Bibles including the Revised Standard Version Catholic Edition, the New American Bible Revised Edition, and the Douay–Rheims Bible (co-branded with TAN Books). In recent years, the SBP imprint has been used primarily for resources marketed toward parish large-group ministry and Scripture study.
- Catholic Courses: A series of DVDs and study materials on a variety of subjects, intended for large-group study in a parish setting.
- Catholic Scripture Study International: A series of DVDs and study materials written by Catholic Bible scholars, including Scott Hahn, Steve Ray, and Mike Aquilina.
- Basilica Press: Publishes The Shepherd's Voice Series, a series of pamphlets expounding the teachings of contemporary bishops and cardinals on topics currently facing the Church, as well as books by contemporary Catholic authors including Patrick Madrid and Mark Shea. SBP has been the exclusive publisher of Basilica Press since April 2016.

== Personalities ==
=== Editors ===
Since 2009, SBP's acquisitions editor has been Todd Agliloro. Agliloro is a blogger for Inside Catholic (formerly Crisis magazine) and a former editor for the Sophia Institute Press.

=== Authors ===
==== Living ====
- Mike Aquilina
- C. John McCloskey
- Scott J. Bloch
- Brian Robertson
- Elizabeth Fiocelli
- Lorraine V. Murray
- Fred Berretta
- John Salza
- Thomas Colyandro
- G.C. Dilsaver
- Dave Armstrong
- Fr. Marie Dominque Philippe, O.P.
- Phillip Campbell

==== Deceased ====
- Fr. Jean-Pierre de Caussade
- Saint John of the Cross
- Saint Catherine of Siena
- John Henry Newman
- Anne Catherine Emmerich
- Saint Ignatius of Loyola
- Saint Bonaventure
- Saint Therese of Lisieux
- Saint Francis de Sales
- Saint Alphonsus Liguori
- Saint Teresa of Avila

== See also ==
- Ascension (publisher)
- Augustine Institute
- Ignatius Press
- Word on Fire
