= Dave Armstrong (Catholic apologist) =

American Catholic apologist (born 1958)

- Born: 1958 (age 67–68); Detroit, Michigan, U.S.
- Education: Bachelor of Arts in Sociology (cum laude), Wayne State University, 1982
- Occupations: Catholic apologist, author, blogger
- Spouse: Judy Armstrong
- Children: 4
- Writing career
- Language: English
- Genres: Catholic apologetics, theology
- Notable works: The Catholic Answer Bible, A Biblical Defense of Catholicism, The Catholic Verses
- Notable awards: Catholic Website of the Year (1998, Envoy Magazine)

Dave Armstrong (born 1958) is an American Catholic apologist, author, and blogger.

His blog, which includes material from his previous website, contains more than 2500 articles defending Christianity. It is award-winning and has had over two million visitors. He has written over 18 books, including The Catholic Answer Bible.

== Professional background ==
Raised as a Methodist in Detroit, Michigan, Armstrong converted to non-denominational, Arminian evangelicalism in 1977, with strong affinities to the Jesus Movement and Messianic Judaism, and then to Catholicism in 1990, largely as a result of reading John Henry Cardinal Newman's Essay on the Development of Christian Doctrine. He was received into the Catholic Church in February 1991 by Father John Hardon, SJ. Armstrong's conversion story was one of eleven in Patrick Madrid's Surprised by Truth.

Armstrong began his website, "Biblical Evidence for Catholicism," in March 1997 and it was described in a magazine article in 2002 as "well-known among both Catholic and Protestant apologists, garnering an estimated 200,000 or more hits annually...a virtual Catholic Encyclopedia". The site received the "Catholic Website of the Year" award from the Catholic apologetics periodical Envoy Magazine in 1998.

Armstrong's website has achieved notice in the Protestant community; its C. S. Lewis links page has been cited as a further reference source in the evangelical periodical, Christianity Today. Moreover, secular newspapers like the Los Angeles Times have cited the same Lewis web page. In 2004, Christian History magazine lauded Armstrong's Malcolm Muggeridge links page as "...the best website from which to explore Muggeridge is hosted by Roman Catholic apologist Dave Armstrong."

Armstrong's website was online for ten years (until March 2007), and his present blog (of the same name) first started operation in February 2004, eventually incorporating all of his previous website articles, and adding many additional ones (currently "more than 2500"). It has received over two million visitors since that time.

In 2002, The Catholic Answer Bible (later revised with a co-author as the New Catholic Answer Bible) was the first of Armstrong's books to be published by Our Sunday Visitor. In 2003 Sophia Institute Press published the first of its five Armstrong books, A Biblical Defense of Catholicism. He now has authored eighteen volumes.

Armstrong has appeared on nationally syndicated Catholic radio talk shows, including Catholic Connection with Teresa Tomeo and two interviews on Catholic Answers Live. He's also served as a staff member of The Coming Home Network as Forum Coordinator and Head Moderator of their Internet Discussion Forum, from 2007 to 2010.

== Personal background ==
He has been married to his wife Judy since October 1984, and the couple has three sons and a daughter. Armstrong holds a Bachelor of Arts in sociology (cum laude) from Wayne State University, Detroit, 1982.

== Book reviews ==
- A Biblical Defense of Catholicism, by Michael J. Miller, in Homiletic & Pastoral Review, May 2004.
- The Catholic Verses, by Michael J. Miller, in Homiletic & Pastoral Review, October 2005.
- The One-Minute Apologist, by Carl E. Olson, in National Catholic Register, August 26 - September 1, 2007 issue.
- Multiple reviews of 100 Biblical Arguments Against Sola Scriptura (Fr. Dwight Longenecker / Devin Rose / Brandon Vogt / Nick Hardesty / Jeff Miller / Pedro Vega) [May–August 2012]

== Published works ==
=== Books ===
- "Confessions of a 1980s' Jesus Freak," (pp. 241–252) in Surprised by Truth, edited by Patrick Madrid (Basilica Press, 1994). ISBN 978-0-964261-08-2
- "The Imitation of Mary," chapter 5 (pp. 31–35) in The Catholic Answer Book of Mary, edited by Fr. Peter M. J. Stravinskas (Our Sunday Visitor, 2000). ISBN 0-879733-47-0
- A Biblical Defense of Catholicism [Foreword by John Hardon, SJ] (Sophia Institute Press, 2003; originally completed in May 1996) ISBN 1-928832-95-4
- The Catholic Verses: 95 Bible Passages That Confound Protestants (Sophia Institute Press, 2004) ISBN 1-928832-73-3
- The New Catholic Answer Bible (co-author, Dr. Paul Thigpen, Our Sunday Visitor, 2005; 44 of 88 apologetics inserts; NAB version; revised 2011 with revised NAB) ISBN 978-1-592761-86-9
- The One-Minute Apologist: Essential Catholic Replies to Over Sixty Common Protestant Claims (Sophia Institute Press, 2007) ISBN 978-1-933184-23-4
- The Wisdom of Mr. Chesterton: The Very Best Quotes, Quips & Cracks from the Pen of G. K. Chesterton (Saint Benedict Press / TAN Books, 2009) ISBN 978-1-935302-19-3
- Bible Proofs for Catholic Truths: A Source Book for Apologists and Inquirers (Sophia Institute Press, 2009) ISBN 978-1-933184-57-9
- 100 Biblical Arguments Against Sola Scriptura (Catholic Answers, May 2012) ISBN 978-1-933919-59-1
- The Quotable Newman: A Definitive Guide to His Central Thoughts and Ideas [Foreword by Joseph Pearce] (Sophia Institute Press, 12 October 2012) ISBN 978-1-933184-84-5

=== Articles ===
- "The Real Martin Luther," The Catholic Answer, January/February 1993, 32–37.
- This Rock, September 1993, 14–16.
- The Catholic Answer, September/October 1995, 8–11.
- "The Pre-Eminence of St. Peter: 50 New Testament Proofs," The Catholic Answer, January/February 1997, 32–35.
- "To Orthodox Critics of Catholic Apostolicity: Unity Still Sought," The Catholic Answer, November/December 1997, 32–35, 38–39, 62.
- The Coming Home Journal, January–March 1998, 12–13.
- "The Imitation of Mary," The Catholic Answer, May/June 1998, 8–11.
- The Coming Home Journal, July–December 1998, 12–13, 31.
- The Coming Home Journal, July–December 1998, 18–20.
- "The Communion of Saints," The Catholic Answer, November/December 1998, 8–12.
- The Latin Mass, Fall 1999, Vol. 8, No. 4, 65–71.
- The Coming Home Journal, July–December 1999, 16–18.
- cover story on the Eucharist, Envoy Magazine, January/February 2000, cover and 1, 34–40.
- Our Sunday Visitor, July 2002.
- (in Spanish) Our Sunday Visitor, July 2002.
- This Rock, February 2004, 20–22.
- This Rock, April 2004, 25–27.
- "A Quick Ten-Step Refutation of Sola Scriptura," This Rock, September 2004, 18–21.
- This Rock, November 2004.
- "'Can I Get a Quote on That?': An Interview With Dave Armstrong," Gilbert Magazine (Vol. 13, No. 5, March 2010, pp. 14–17; interviewer: Dale Ahlquist. This periodical is published by the American Chesterton Society, and was devoted primarily to Armstrong's book, The Wisdom of Mr. Chesterton.
- "Ten Deficiencies of Sola Scriptura as a Rule of Faith," Catholic Answers Magazine, May / June 2012, 22–25.
