= The Da Vinci Hoax =

2004 nonfiction book

The Da Vinci Hoax: Exposing the Errors in the Da Vinci Code
- Author: Carl E. Olsen and Sandra Miesel
- Language: English
- Subject: Criticism of The Da Vinci Code
- Genre: Non-fiction
- Publisher: Ignatius Press
- Publication date: 2004
- Publication place: United States
- Media type: Print (Hardcover and Paperback), eBook

The Da Vinci Hoax: Exposing the Errors in the Da Vinci Code is a non-fiction book written by Carl E. Olsen and Sandra Miesel for the express purpose of critiquing Dan Brown's novel The Da Vinci Code. The book was first published in 2004 by Ignatius Press.

According to Olsen and Miesel, they wrote the book out of concern that Brown's novel was popularizing fringe theories, pseudo-history, and beliefs which are used as the basis of the novel's plot. Brown had defended these as factually grounded, despite criticism from historians and theologians. The authors argue that such ideas mislead the public by portraying Christianity—particularly the Roman Catholic Church—as built on fabrications and secrets allegedly hidden for centuries.

The authors assert that the novel's underlying claims are rooted in discredited gnostic texts and modern feminist reinterpretations, presented as revelations but lacking historical credibility. They provide detailed refutations of the historical, theological, and artistic claims made in Brown's novel, particularly those related to Jesus, Mary Magdalene, the Council of Nicaea, and the role of Constantine in shaping early Christianity.

== Reception ==
The Da Vinci Hoax received generally favorable attention among religious scholars, Catholic publications, and Christian media, who praised its thoroughness and polemical clarity.

The book was endorsed by several Catholic bishops and used in parish reading groups as an apologetic response to Brown’s work.

A review in the National Catholic Register called it "an indispensable guide for readers who felt overwhelmed or confused by the sensationalism of Brown’s book," noting its accessible language and strong scholarly foundation.

Mainstream secular publications were more mixed. While some reviewers appreciated the authors’ command of church history, others saw the tone as overly defensive or lacking in literary nuance. The New York Times did not review the book, but religious commentary platforms such as Crisis Magazine and Catholic Answers praised its academic rigor and moral urgency.

By 2006, the book had sold over 100,000 copies, largely through Catholic bookstores and religious networks.

== See also ==
- Inaccuracies in The Da Vinci Code
- Criticism of The Da Vinci Code
- Gnosticism
- Historical Jesus
