= Reactions to the Da Vinci Code film in the Philippines =

The Da Vinci Code is a 2006 American mystery-thriller film directed by Ron Howard. The screenplay was written by Akiva Goldsman and based on Dan Brown's 2003 novel The Da Vinci Code. It was distributed worldwide by Sony Pictures.

The Da Vinci Code was released in the Philippines on May 18, 2006. Due to controversial and inaccurate historical interpretations and perceived anti-Catholic elements, the film proved highly controversial in the Philippines, a highly religious country in Southeast Asia in which Catholicism is widely practised. Many organisations protested and organised boycotts against the showing of The Da Vinci Code in the Philippines.

== Initial reactions ==
The Philippine Alliance Against Pornography (PAAP) appealed to Philippine President Gloria Macapagal Arroyo to stop the showing of The Da Vinci Code in the Philippines. They branded the film as "the most pornographic and blasphemous film in history" and also requested the help of Pope Benedict XVI, the Catholic Bishops' Conference of the Philippines (CBCP) and other religious groups to stop the showing of the film. The PAAP also compared Dan Brown to Adolf Hitler.

However, Cecille Guidote Alvarez, Philippine Presidential Adviser on Culture and the Arts, said Malacañang will not interfere in controversy about the film and leaves the decision to the Movie and Television Review and Classification Board's (MTRCB) rating. Eventually, MTRCB decided to give The Da Vinci Code an R-18 rating (restricted to those under 18 years of age) despite PAAP's opposition for showing it.

== Reactions ==
=== Religious leaders ===
Jaro Archbishop Angel Lagdameo, president of the CBCP, expressed through a pastoral letter that even though The Da Vinci Code is a work of fiction, it "shapes the imagination, stirs emotions and forms mental associations" and added that "Brown has created the impression that his fiction is historical fact." Earlier, Lipa Archdiocese Archbishop Ramon Arguelles, CBCP senior member requested the MTRCB to prohibit the film for its alleged "blasphemy".

Cardinal Gaudencio Rosales, Archbishop of Manila, said that the film is a "vicious attack on the divinity of Jesus Christ". He also added that "not since the time of the Presbyter Arius was there an attack on the divinity of Jesus Christ, which was as vicious and as momentarily profitable as this venture of Dan Brown and Sony Film Productions." The CBCP and Rosales did not demand a ban of the film, instead considering it an evangelistic challenge for the Catholic Church and issued guidelines for Filipino Catholics on watching it.

Mario Sobrejuanite, vice chairman of the Catholic Bishops Conference of the Philippines-Catholic Initiative for Enlightened Movie Appreciation (CBCP-Cinema), rated The Da Vinci Code as R-18 and stated that the film is something that Catholics should not be afraid of. However, the CBCP-Cinema rated the moral assessment on the film as "disturbing."

Moro Islamic Liberation Front Deputy Chairman Khaled Musa supported the push to ban the film, arguing that it was also blasphemous to Muslims because it attributes "accusations not befitting" Jesus Christ as a prophet in Islam. Musa said that screening the film would not bring any good to the people, comparing it to the Jyllands-Posten Muhammad cartoons controversy, and concluded that freedom of expression should not "invade" freedom of religion.

=== Government ===
The city council of Manila passed a resolution to ban the film, labelling it as "offensive and contrary to established religious beliefs which cannot take precedence over the right of the persons involved in the film to freedom of expression". The Councilors who concur to the resolution cited the Revised Penal Code of the Philippines stating that showing a film that offends a religion is a crime, while Councilors who opposed the decision noted that the film is only fiction and for entertainment. It was stated that cinema owners not heeding to the ban would face a one-year jail term and a Php 5,000 fine, and those persons selling DVD or VCD copies of the film could be fined Php 3,000 and jailed for up to six months. It was not banned in any of the other cities in Metro Manila, making the film easily accessible to citizens living in the capital.

Filipino congressman Bienvenido Abante Jr., who is also president of the Metropolitan Baptist Church of the Philippines, filed House Bill 3269 which sought to abolish the MTRCB for allowing a "demonic and diabolical" film to be shown.
