= The Bible in a Year =

American Catholic podcast

- Genre: Catholic, Christian
- Language: English

Cast and voices
- Hosted by: Mike Schmitz

Publication
- Original release: January 1 – December 31, 2021

Related
- Website: media.ascensionpress.com

The Bible in a Year is an American podcast hosted by Fr. Mike Schmitz, a Catholic priest based in Duluth, Minnesota.

== About ==
The podcast was created and recorded daily throughout 2021. Each of the 365 episodes discussed different aspects of the Bible and faith. The podcast follows a reading plan, The Great Adventure Bible Timeline, inspired by Bible scholar Jeff Cavins. Cavins was a regular guest of the podcast, introducing each new biblical time period with Fr. Schmitz.

It achieved a high level of popularity and became the most-downloaded podcast on Apple's platform for several weeks in early 2021, and again in early 2022. The podcast is produced by Ascension Press. An Ascension staff member, Lauren Joyce, suggested that its success could be attributable to a need for faith during the COVID-19 pandemic, which limited in-person religious services; podcasting in general increased in popularity during the pandemic.

== See also ==
- List of religion and spirituality podcasts
