= Jeff Cavins =

American biblical scholar (born 1957)

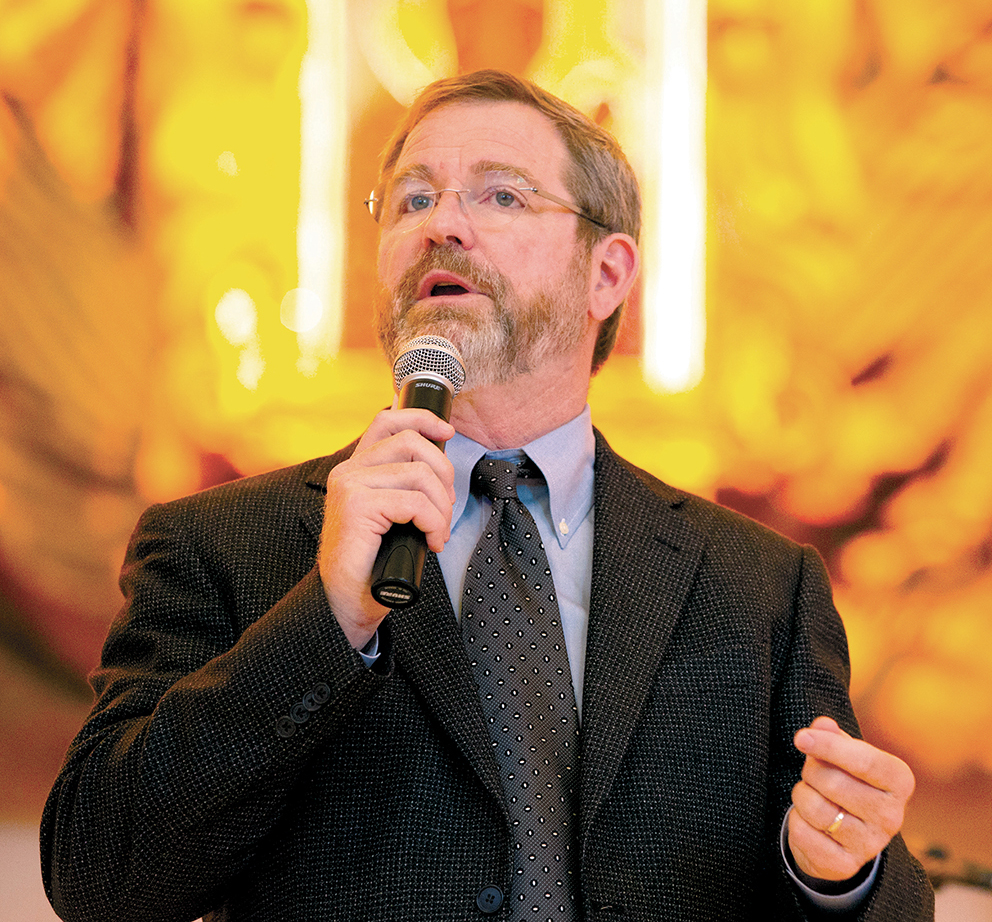
- Cavins speaking at a seminar in 2014
- Born: November 8, 1957 (age 68)
- Occupations: Evangelist, author, and biblical scholar

Academic background
- Education: Antioch University (B.A.); Franciscan University of Steubenville (M.A.)
- Website: Holy Land Pilgrimage and Tours

Jeff Cavins (born November 8, 1957) is an American Catholic evangelist, author and biblical scholar. He was a Protestant pastor before he rejoined the Catholic Church. He is the creator of The Great Adventure Bible Study program, was the founding host of the Life on the Rock show on EWTN and was a host of Morning Air on Relevant Radio.

== Biography ==
=== Early life ===
Cavins grew up outside of Minneapolis in a Catholic family. In college, he met his future wife Emily. While attending Christ for the Nations Institute, he noticed how many born-again Christians were attracted to the Bible, unlike the adherents of his own faith, whom he felt were "dead." He subsequently left the Catholic Church after a public dispute with a bishop.

=== Evangelical pastor ===
While working for a Christian radio station, Cavins trained to become a Protestant pastor. After completing a program at The Institute of Ministry in Bradenton, Florida, he returned to Minnesota as the first pastor of Open Arms ministry. While there, he developed the first iteration of his Bible Timeline program, which focuses on understanding the narrative books of the Bible, using a color-coded timeline to display the supporting books for each element. This later became the basis for his Great Adventure Bible Study program.

=== Return to Catholicism and Steubenville ===
Cavins decided to return to the Catholic Church after 12 years as an evangelical pastor. In 1996 he introduced his Great Adventure Bible Timeline to Franciscan University of Steubenville, where he taught Introduction to Scripture. Later that year, Franciscan University professor Scott Hahn partnered with him to film Our Father's Plan, a thirteen-part series based on the Timeline program, to be broadcast on EWTN. Cavins received his MA in theology from Franciscan University of Steubenville in 1999.

== Evangelization projects ==
=== The Great Adventure Bible Study Program ===
Cavins developed The Great Adventure Bible Study program, which organizes the Bible into a reading plan structured on the narrative parts of the text.

=== Podcast ===
The Great Adventure Bible Timeline was used, in 2021, as the framework for the popular The Bible in a Year podcast, hosted by Fr Mike Schmitz with some commentary by Cavins. The podcast was the number-one podcast in America for 17 days in 2021 and for five days in 2022.

=== Television ===
In 1996 Mother Angelica, then president of EWTN, asked Cavins to develop a weekly live program for young people. The Cavins family moved to Birmingham, Alabama, and launched Life on the Rock, which he hosted for six years.

=== Books ===
Cavins has authored a number of books:

- My Life on the Rock, Walking with God: A Journey Through the Bible
- I’m Not Being Fed! Discovering the Food that Satisfies the Soul
- Praise God and Thank Him: Biblical Keys to a Joyful Life
- When You Suffer: Biblical Keys for Hope and Understanding
- Pope Fiction: Answers to 30 Myths & Misconceptions About the Papacy (with Patrick Madrid)
- The Activated Disciple: Taking Your Faith to the Next Level

He has co-edited the Amazing Grace series of books.

=== Archdiocese of St. Paul and Minneapolis ===
In 2008 he took over as director of the Archbishop Harry J. Flynn Catechetical Institute in St. Paul, Minnesota, which prepares adults for teaching catechetics in the home, at parishes, and in parochial schools. In 2014, Cavins was named director of evangelization for the Archdiocese of St. Paul and Minneapolis.

=== Year of Mercy ===
In 2016, Cavins presented a video reflection as part of a multi-part series in response to the Extraordinary Jubilee of Mercy declared by Pope Francis.

=== Detroit Amazing Parish Conference ===
In April 2016, Cavins was a featured panelist at the Amazing Parish Conference, speaking to parishes in the Archdiocese of Detroit about ways that parishes can engage their parishioners to become more involved with the church.

== Awards ==
- "Envoy of the Year" for Excellence in Evangelization, 1997
- "Unity Award" for best Catholic television show, 2000
- "Christ Brings Hope Award" from Relevant Radio
- “Pillar Award” from Museum of the Bible, 2026

== Personal life ==
Cavins is married to Emily, with whom he has three daughters. He resides in Minnesota.

== See also ==
- Mary Healy (theologian)
