= Kenneth Baker (Jesuit) =

American academic administrator and priest (1929–2026)

Fr. Kenneth Ward Baker, S.J. (November 12, 1929 – August 6, 2026) was an American Roman Catholic priest in the Society of Jesus. Besides his pastoral duties as a priest he served as a professor of theology and a university president. He also worked to bring the message of the Roman Catholic Church into more forms of communication media, most notably as editor-in-chief in the magazine the Homiletic and Pastoral Review which has been called "one of the most important magazines for priests in the English speaking world".

== Background ==
Kenneth Ward Baker was born in Tacoma, Washington on November 12, 1929, to Catherine and Kenneth Baker Sr. Baker was born a month after the onset of the Great Depression. Under the economic stressors of the time Baker's parents' marriage dissolved and they got a divorce. Baker was given to Daniel and Mary Browne, his maternal grandparents, to raise. Baker had little contact with his parents and shared his grandparents home with their two youngest children, who were his aunt and uncle.

Baker's grandfather Daniel Browne worked as a dock worker and a construction foreman. Browne had traveled west from Nova Scotia and arrived at Spokane around 1900. He moved his family to Tacoma near the new port of Puget Sound in 1920. The booming trade with Asia increased the wealth of Tacoma and it was a large fashionable city when Baker grew up there.

He had not been baptized by his parents and neither his father nor his grandfather were Catholic. His grandmother was a practicing Catholic and desired that he attend parochial school at St. Leo Jesuit parish (rather than the local nearby public school). To facilitate this Baker was baptized at the age of five, and reportedly "thought very little of it, seeing it as just another part of starting school."

=== Schooling ===
The parish school of St. Leo's was staffed by Franciscan Sisters who instructed Baker and his fellow students in their studies and in the Catholic faith. At this time Baker showed no signs of developing a vocation to the priesthood and at one point when the Sisters asked the boys in his class which of them would like to grow up and be priests, Baker was the only one who did not raise his hand. The young Baker got into "various kinds of trouble like other boys his age" and making use of the Catholic sacrament of confession officiated by Fr. Augustine Krebsbach.

Baker had intended to the Catholic parochial school Bellarmine High, but circumstances prevented this. Baker's grandfather had suffered a stroke and was no longer able to work and his grandmother made the only income for the family, bringing in $6.00 a week as a restaurant cook.

Rather than force Baker to attend public high school his uncle, who owned a restaurant, offered to pay the first year of the Jesuit Bellarmine high school's tuition of $80. His uncle also offered Baker a job so that by working weeknights and weekends he could earn the money to continue going to Catholic school. Baker began as a dishwasher and moved up to fry cook. Baker was able to earn enough to buy a 1938 Dodge four door sedan at the age of sixteen.

Three different US military branches had bases in Tacoma and when World War II was being fought many servicemen came into the restaurant, some of the waitresses made money on the side by engaging in prostitution using the job as a contact point for customers. To Baker this worldly behavior was a sharp contrast from the way the Jesuit scholastics teaching at Bellarmine high comported themselves.

He spent much of his spare time in student activities including dances and parties, sometimes taking girls from two nearby Catholic girls' schools out for a movie and a hamburger with rootbeer.

With his junior year in high school Baker became a serious student as he began to consider joining the navy to become a pilot or being the first in his family to attend college. At this time he also became more serious about his faith, attending Mass daily as devotion for Lent. Baker in an attempt to get elected to the school council paid five dollars to a friend who flew an airplane to drop leaflets on the school yard in support of his election. A strong wind blew the leaflets away from the school and onto the football field where the principal made Baker collect them. He did not win the election.

As a high school senior Baker began regularly dating a cheerleader named Pat from a rival school. To Baker's surprise that same year the chaplain at Bellarmine high suggested he consider joining the novitiate of the Society of Jesus. While unaware of any priestly vocation Baker wanted to learn more about the Jesuit way of life. After informing his girlfriend (who was unhappy but supportive) Baker began a two-year trial period as a Jesuit novice on August 15, 1947.

== Jesuit training ==
In the monastic framework of the novitiate, Baker grew to enjoy the regular regimen of prayer, instruction, and work. After the two-year trial period ended, Baker was committed to join the Jesuits and on the Feast of Assumption 1949 he took the perpetual vows of poverty, chastity and obedience in the Society of Jesus and began an eleven-year program to become a priest. In accordance with Jesuit training Baker took two years of classical study and then three years of philosophy. He then went on to teach Latin and Greek as a scholastic at Gonzaga Preparatory School in Spokane. Baker enjoyed teaching and pictured a future serving in that role.

Aware of Baker's interest in teaching his Provincial offered him a chance to study theology at the Austrian Jesuit University of Innsbruck. Although Baker's focus had been the Classics he accepted the offer. Living in the Austrian highlands Baker soon became fluent in German and became an expert skier.

Within a year at Innsbruck he was passionate about his new focus studying theology and became deeply interested in theological matters and movements within the Catholic Church. On July 26, 1960, Baker was ordained a priest at Holy Trinity church in Innsbruck. In 1961 Baker completed his formal study of theology and received the Licentiate degree.

Returning to America and Washington State, Baker was prepared to enter the period of tertianship, where young Jesuit priests are placed in pastoral situations to prepare them for the future. His tertianship was placed on hold, however, when the Jesuit Provincial asked him to fill in temporarily as a philosophy professor for Gonzaga University. For two years Baker taught logic, philosophy of man, and philosophy of God and then entered his tertianship (which he completed in 1963).

Desiring to study more about Christian Scripture Baker received permission to pursue a graduate degree at Marquette University. In 1967 he earned a Ph.D. and then was sent to Gonzaga University to serve as an assistant professor of the theological faculty.

== Teaching at Gonzaga University ==
Returning to Gonzaga, Baker felt that a change had overcome many of his fellow priests and the nuns working there. Some among the nuns were removing their habits and placing less emphasis on their religious identity. Baker also felt disquieted by priests, seminarians, and nuns gathering for informal "beer parties" on campus. Investigating such parties, Baker felt that they were leading to an "unhealthy spirit, a breakdown in the commitment to a complete and exclusive following of Christ, a haze dimming the witness to the reality of eternal life."

Advocating for a stricter obedience to the papacy, Baker became chairman of the theology department for Gonzaga in 1968. His position was ""Both arms around the Pope, that's my principle." In the summer of 1968, Pope Paul VI issued Humanae Vitae, reaffirming the Catholic doctrine against the use of man-made birth control. While a wave of dissent arose throughout Catholic universities across North America, Gonzaga's faculty remained loyal and gave a series of lectures in support of the encyclical. Baker supported the document by preaching from the pulpit of Spokane's Jesuit Church.

With a growing experience in academics and administration, Baker fine-tuned his ideas on what was required to restore and emphasize Catholic identity within Catholic educational institutions. While many Catholic educational institutions were seen as "secularizing" by turning over control to lay boards of directors, Baker advocated the opposite, defending the preservation of ecclesiastical affiliation and the Jesuit spirit of solidarity and service. Baker's sermon during the opening Mass of the Jesuit University of Seattle drew special attention for its emphasis on this subject, and he was instrumental in assuring that Jesuit control remained in the revised charter of Gonzaga.

== President of Seattle University ==
In late November 1969 the Jesuit Provincial called Baker into his office and informed him that the president of Seattle University was being replaced and that he, then forty-years-old, was being appointed to the position.

=== Previous conditions ===
In the years previous to Baker's presidency, a construction boom had taken place at Seattle University under the presidency of Fr. Albert A. Lemiuex (who had led the university since 1948 – soon after it changed its name from Seattle College). University leaders had projected the increased enrollment of the 1950s would continue. Loans were taken out to fund the construction of buildings to handle these projections, such as the student residency building Campion Hall (which required a loan of 3.6 million dollars). But the projections proved wrong and rather than the forecast enrollment of 6,000 students in 1969, a decline in student numbers occurred, resulting in a student body of 1,076, which left the university saddled with near empty buildings and in dire financial trouble.

In addition to financial problems at the university, Baker had to deal with student unrest. During the early stages of the Vietnam War, the majority of Seattle University students had been supportive of the military endeavor. After the 1968 Tet Offensive, the majority of student opinion swung against the war and protests on campus rose drastically. By 1970 hundreds of students were taking part in rallies and teach-ins. The protesters took especial issue with the presence of ROTC on campus.

Also previous to Baker's presidency the Black Student Union (BSU) accused the university of institutional racism for a denial of funding for their proposal to host the first separate black homecoming. On January 14, 1970, the BSU, through its spokesperson Bobby Davis, stated that the $3,700 given to the homecoming committee consisting of only white students was giving money "to a white group to go out and put on a white homecoming for a black team. This is the kind of monolithic amerliorism that black people have to contend with. Your Neil Diamond, or whoever, he is, can only be relevant to white, completely bourgeois people." Later when the student government refused to increase the BSU's budget the group threatened a boycott in which black basketball players would refuse to play. The boycott did not take place, but on January 19, 1970, weeks before Baker took office a bomb exploded between the Liberal Arts and Garrand buildings causing costly structural damage, but no injuries or loss of life.

=== Baker's tenure ===
Baker, who had been chosen "for both his economic and political conservatism" was installed as the 17th head of Seattle University on February 1, 1970. He was the fifth man to hold the title President (between the school's founding in 1891 to 1936 the job's title was Administrator).

He began a series of severe budget cuts, all the while receiving continuous demands for more funding from the heads of different academic programs. In a February 26, 1970 interview with the student newspaper The Spectator he said "S.U. is not a monstrous, sleek fat cow with hundreds of teats that every group can suck on endlessly. The little milk left is all spoken for while there are many hungry mouths." Some students and faculty began to hold that Baker's cuts were discriminatory and biased.

==== Vietnam protests ====
A few months into Baker's presidency news of the U.S. invasion of Cambodia and the Kent State shootings inspired student radicalism and riots on the campus of Seattle University. Baker became convinced that many of the riots "were manufactured by professional agitators." In March 1970 Xavier Hall was set on fire by arsonists timing it to the on campus appearance of Barry Goldwater. Baker received death threats from revolutionary organizations and for three weeks was under 24-hour police protection. On one occasion his office was broken into and his furniture was smashed, twice large groups of students forced their way into his office to shout complaints and demands and in effect keeping him captive. Baker found their demands and objections unreasonable and "perceived that the agitation was designed to wreak havoc on the school" so he stood firm.

==== Racial tensions ====
In addition to student unrest over the Vietnam War, racial tensions again surfaced at Seattle University during Baker's presidency in the spring of 1970. William Cooley, Chairman of the Faculty Urban Affairs Committee publicly stated that the campus was "permeated by racism." His comments were recalled during unrest caused by a hiring decision.

Dr. Anita Yourglich, chairperson of the sociology department had sought out a candidate for an interim vacancy position. Her final two candidates "were Ray Napierkowski, a 1969 honors graduate from Seattle U, or William Hodge, a Black teaching assistant from the University of Washington with a master’s degree in sociology." When she selected Napierkowski her fellow faculty encouraged her to reconsider fearing that the choice would be perceived as racist. Yourglich stated that she had chosen Napierkowski for his statistics and research background. The news of this decision caused outrage among much of the faculty and student body who held the university lacked commitment to affirmative action in hiring educators.

Interviewed by the student newspaper The Spectator, Yourglich stated that the first priority of her job was to advance the understanding of Sociology "As far as need for a black image at S.U. in general and the sociology department in particular is concerned, I do not feel my first obligation lies in this area." And that "blackness" is not a requirement to advance the aims of the sociology department. The editors of The Spectator felt the decision was part of a pattern of resistance against the hiring of minority faculty members at the university and published an editorial memorandum blasting the school for racial imbalance in employment, running it alongside the interview with Yourglich.

==== Major demonstration ====
On May 15, 1970, a day after the editorial in The Spectator, a major campus demonstration began at 6:45 in the morning with over 150 demonstrators "made up of members of Seattle U’s Afro-American Movement for Equality (SAAME), unaffiliated Seattle U students, and activists from Seattle Community College (now Seattle Central Community College) and the University of Washington." Not all the protesters had the same agenda. The members of SAAME were demanding Hodge be hired, while other S.U., SCC and UW students were angry about the extension of the war into Cambodia and were protesting the presence of the ROTC on campus - calling for it to be disbanded. The protesters blocked the entrance to the Chieftain building which stored ROTC's weapons used for the cadets' Wednesday drills. To avoid conflict the cadets rerouted their activities. Emboldened by this success the protesters marched to the Liberal Arts and Pigott building, blocked the entrances and chanted anti-War slogans. Some students climbed the flagpole and turned the American flag upside to mimic an official signal of distress.

Baker initially was charitable to the students asking that faculty not punish them academically for either attending or participating in the demonstrations. He told the protesters "I sympathize with you for your consciences. ...I support you." As the demonstration continued in some places the protests became "small riots". In response, the next day, Baker issued a memo forbidding unapproved demonstrations and rallies. Hearing of this several students led by black student leaders on May 18, 1970, descended upon the Liberal Arts building demanding an audience with Baker. When they were refused "the students invaded the president’s office. Belligerently shouting, students caused significant damages to the space—overturning tables, knocking the president’s books off of his bookshelf and breaking his table lamps." Five of the students involved, including Bobby Davis and Emile Wilson, were suspended on May 19, 1970. On May 20, 1970, students of the Afro-American Movement for Equality held another demonstration of around 300 people, which included Seattle University students and outside activists. During this rally six protesters were arrested after trashing the Seattle University Student Union cafeteria.

Interviewed by the local media Baker told reporters that he would remain firm and not let the protesters “break SU so we’ll have to turn it over to the state and make it a black university,” he promised he would “not tolerate anarchical activity on campus. This is not a return to the jungle."

At the Student Conduct Review Board Emile Wilson, who had been at both the take over of Baker's office and was among those arrested days later was defended by his personal friend Fr. McGoldrick, S.J.. In a decision approved by Fr. McGoldrick the board reinstated all of the suspended students and the criminal charges against Wilson were dropped. (Wilson with the tutoring of Fr. McGoldrick would later become the university's first Rhodes Scholar.)

=== Resignation ===
Baker's stance against the agitated students did not receive universal support, some school benefactors and other people of influence demanded he be fired and replaced by someone with a more conciliatory approach. Feeling his drive to implement his vision of Catholic education would be unachievable in the current climate Baker resigned the University Presidency on November 1, 1970, after having served nine months. In his resignation letter Baker addressed the student protesters directly, saying "Although I have had differences with some of you, I respect you and admire the maturity that has been developed here over the years."

Baker was seen as a "stern conservative" during his tenure, which has been summarized in the Seattle University literature as follows: "Baker’s budget cuts were necessary, but his outspoken style antagonized students and faculty alike." The university trustees replaced Baker with Father Louis Gaffney, SJ. who preached "contagious optimism", and was able to secure "generous help from the university’s benefactors" and different terms from the university's creditors. Gaffney continued on Baker's path of further cutting budgets. He also made a major reorganization of campus departments and increased outreach efforts and fund-raising.

Despite Baker's departure, trouble at Seattle University did not completely cease and on May 6, 1972, a large bomb detonated under the steps of the ROTC building, blowing out all the windows on the facing side of Loyola Hall. Seattle University would continue to struggle with financial problems, until the 1976 presidency of Fr. William J. Sullivan (the fifth president in six years). Sullivan made even further cuts in administration and cut funding for the schools nationally recognized basketball program. The SU basketball program had been seen as "a leader in the area of racial integration and diversity" which had played for the NCAA championship in 1958, and over decades of success had produced several players that went on to the NBA (including Hall of Famer Elgin Baylor). Seattle University dropped out of the West Coast Conference and Division I and entered the small-college National Association of Intercollegiate Athletics level. With the withdrawal to the NAIA the school stopped the $450,000 yearly deficit the program was running. The percentage of Jesuit faculty continued to decline, and at the end of Sullivan's tenure had fallen to 10%.

His stance against the radicalised students was noticed by conservative commentator William F. Buckley, Jr. who invited him as a guest on his television show "Firing Line" that filmed in New York City.

== Editor of Homiletic and Pastoral Review ==
While in New York in December 1970 Baker accompanied fellow Jesuit Daniel Lyons (who was later laicized in 1976) to a restaurant. Lyons suggested that the nearly bankrupt Homiletic and Pastoral Review be purchased and Baker should serve as its Editor-in-Chief. The Jesuit Provincial gave his approval and Lyons made a company that bought the magazine on a payment-plan that extended for three years. Baker moved from Washington state to New York to take up his new position. The first issue under his editing was issued in April 1971 with an editorial by him titled "Catholic and Proud of it", and Baker's principle for the magazine was that they "came out four square in favor of the Pope and the magisterium."

The magazine was seen as a conservative voice faithful to Catholicism in an age of tumult brought about by dissent against Humane Vitae. It's subscriptions increased by four thousand and many priests wrote in thankful for such a voice calling it "beacon of light in a dark storm."

Baker's associate Fr. Lyons founded Catholic Views Broadcasts, Inc. in 1974 which produced fifteen-minute interview programs with Catholic commentators addressing social issues for over 100 radio stations. When Lyons left the active ministry in 1975, Baker took over as its director. Baker began publishing a lay-orientated magazine as well in 1978 titled Key to Happiness which got a subscription of 25,000.

Baker was assisted in his media work by being given office space in the New York residence of Cardinal Paul Yü Pin (who had been expelled from China by the Communist Party in 1949). Baker learned Chinese cuisine while working alongside the Cardinal's staff and published a book on understanding the menu of Chinese restaurants with Fr. Paul Chan of the Chinese Catholic Information Center.

He went on to build three community television stations to offer Catholic programming and promote the faith.

Besides his media work over the years Baker also attended the annual bishop's meeting as well as the International Synod in Rome. In addition he gave retreats and led European pilgrimages, besides providing spiritual direction for three convents in the New York City area.

In 2010 Baker stepped down from being the editor of the Homiletic & Pastoral Review after 40 years and was succeeded by his friend and fellow Jesuit scholar Fr. David Vincent Meconi.

After 2010 Baker continued as Editor Emeritus with the magazine writing a monthly editorial and book reviews.

== Death ==
Baker died in Los Gatos, California on August 6, 2026, at the age of 96.

== Bibliography ==
- In 1962 Baker used his knowledge of German to translate Joseph Ratzinger and Karl Rahner's book Primacy and Episcopate into English
- In 1973 Baker translated the Philosophical Dictionary adapted to American usage.
- 1983 Fundamentals of Catholicism a three volume work.
- 1990 A Baker's Decade: Editorially Speaking (All Editorials appearing in "The Homiletic and Pastoral Review" from April 1971 Through Aug-Sept 1981).
- 1998's Inside the Bible: A Guide to Understanding Each Book of the Bible a popular introduction to the Christian Scriptures.
- 2012 Doctrinal Sermons on the Catechism of the Catholic Church
- 2012 The Will of God: Finding and Fulfilling Your Purpose in Life
- 2013 Jesus Christ - True God and True Man: A Handbook on Christology for Non-Theologians
- In 2014 he translated Rahner's Spiritual Exercises into English.

== Television ==
In the late 1980s Baker started two community television stations to promote Catholicism. In addition to televising EWTN, the stations were created to make original programming as well.

In 1987 Baker as President of Catholic Views Broadcast Inc started a community television station at Blue Island, Illinois airing to the Chicago area on UHF channel 54, with the call letters W54AP. In 1989 he started another community television station on UHF channel 53 under the call letters K53CH in Minneapolis, Minnesota.

With the FCC analog to digital conversion, the Illinois station in 2004 moved from channel 54 to 48 and its call-sign became W48DD. The station was sold in 2005 and switched from Catholic to ethnic programming, changing its call-sign to WFBBT-CA.

The Minneapolis station, also due to the analog to digital conversion, was moved from channel 53 to 19 under the call letters of K19ER in 2003. In 2010 the station moved to channel 16 - its new call letters became K16HY-D. In 2009 Baker turned over the Minneapolis station to St. Michael's Broadcasting and its president Michael Bird who continued to broadcast Catholic programming.

Baker appeared on "Mother Angelica Live" and hosted a thirteen-part series on the Bible for EWTN. He also recorded video lectures on Catholic theology concerning the doctrine of the Trinity and the Catholic exegesis of the Old Testament which are distributed by International Catholic University.
