= Ignatius Press =

Catholic publishing house

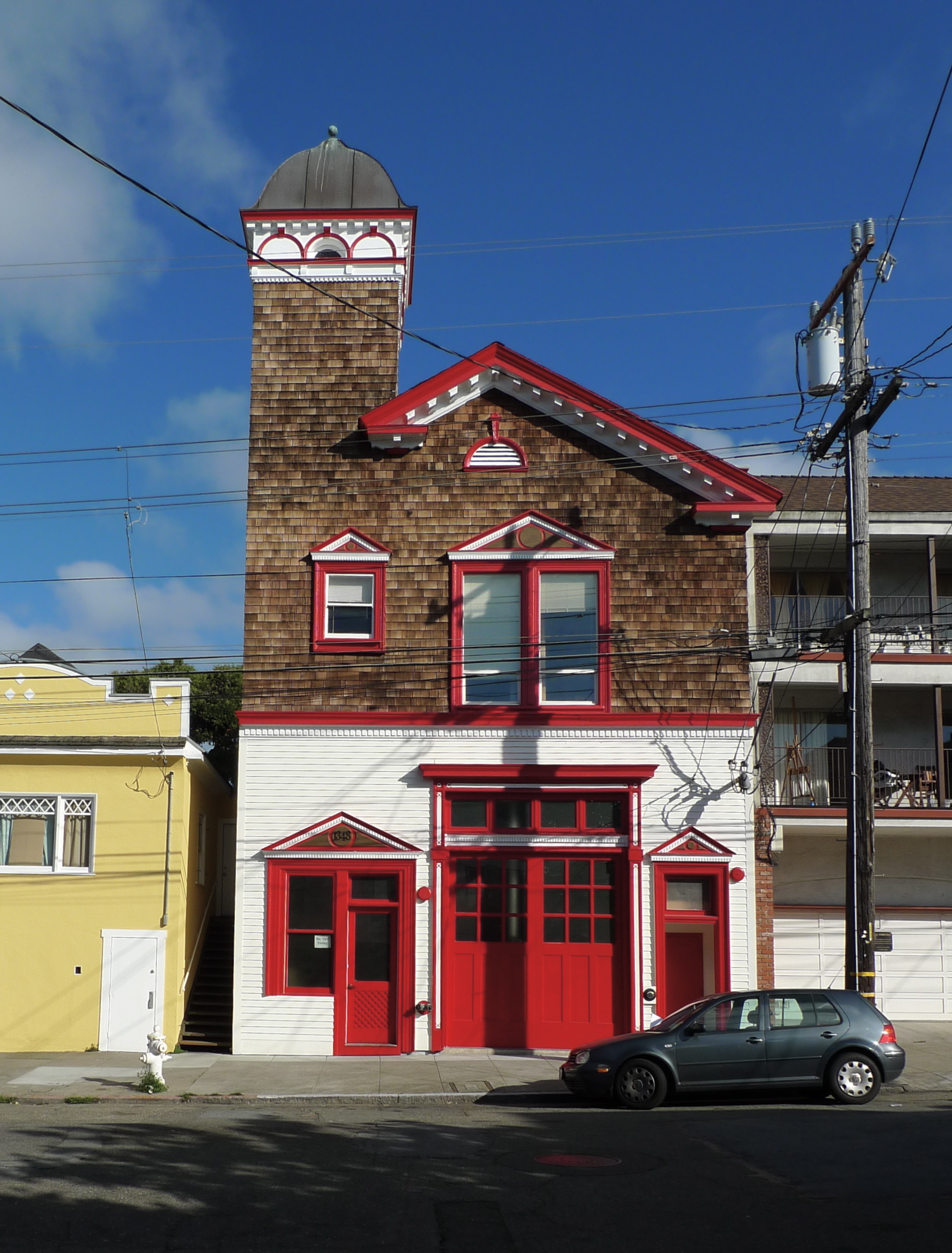
- Parent company: Guadalupe Associates
- Founded: 1978
- Founder: Joseph Fessio
- Country of origin: United States
- Headquarters location: San Francisco
- Distribution: Midpoint Trade Books
- Nonfiction topics: Catholic Church
- Official website: ignatius.com

Ignatius Press is a Catholic theological publishing house based in San Francisco, California, United States.

It was founded in 1978 by Father Joseph Fessio, a former pupil of both Henri de Lubac and Josef Ratzinger (later Pope Benedict XVI). Named after Ignatius of Loyola, founder of the Jesuit order, it is the primary English-language publisher of the works of Pope Benedict XVI, Hans Urs von Balthasar, Henri de Lubac, Robert Cardinal Sarah, Peter Kreeft, Adrienne von Speyr, Robert Spitzer, and others.

In an interview in 1998, Fessio said Ignatius Press's objective "is to support the teachings of the Church". The Press also produces The Catholic World Report, Homiletic and Pastoral Review, Ignatius Insight and the blog Ignatius Insight Scoop.

== History ==
Fr. Joseph Fessio founded the St. Ignatius Institute at the University of San Francisco, a four-year Great Books program. Guadalupe Associates, Inc., was founded in 1977 as the nonprofit parent company of the planned Ignatius Press. Ignatius Press was founded the following year. In an interview published by Catholic World News, Fessio stated that one of the main objectives of Ignatius Press was to print English translations of contemporary European theologians.

The first book Ignatius Press published was a translation of Louis Bouyer's Woman in the Church in 1979. This was followed the same year by a translation of Hans Urs von Balthasar's Heart of the World.

In October 2014, leading up to the Synod on the Family, Ignatius Press sent over 100 copies of a book countering suggestions to permit divorced and civilly remarried Catholics receive communion. Fessio later said that the books never reached the bishops, suggesting they had been stolen from the mailboxes. A Vatican spokesman denied the allegation.

Ignatius Press has a full list of publications with a number of new offerings each spring and fall. Among the reprints it has issued are works by G. K. Chesterton and Hilaire Belloc. In addition to publishing the works of Pope John Paul II, Ignatius Press has published newer works by Cardinal Joseph Ratzinger (later Pope Benedict XVI), Peter Kreeft, Scott Hahn, Joseph Pearce, Christopher Derrick, Michael D. O'Brien, and Mike Aquilina. It also publishes various study and devotional editions of the Ignatius Bible, making use of the Revised Standard Version, Second Catholic Edition, a translation revised according to Liturgiam authenticam and noted for its formal equivalence.

In 2014, Ignatius Press entered into a distribution agreement with the Catholic Truth Society to "bring the famous CTS bookstands to North America". Additionally, it entered a collaboration with the Pope Benedict XVI Institute for Sacred Music and Divine Worship (Archdiocese of San Francisco) and Lighthouse Catholic Media to publish an annual congregational missal that is fully consistent with the directives of the apostolic constitution Sacrosanctum Concilium.

== See also ==
- Ascension (publisher)
- Augustine Institute
- Saint Benedict Press
- Word on Fire
