= TAN Books =

Catholic publishing company

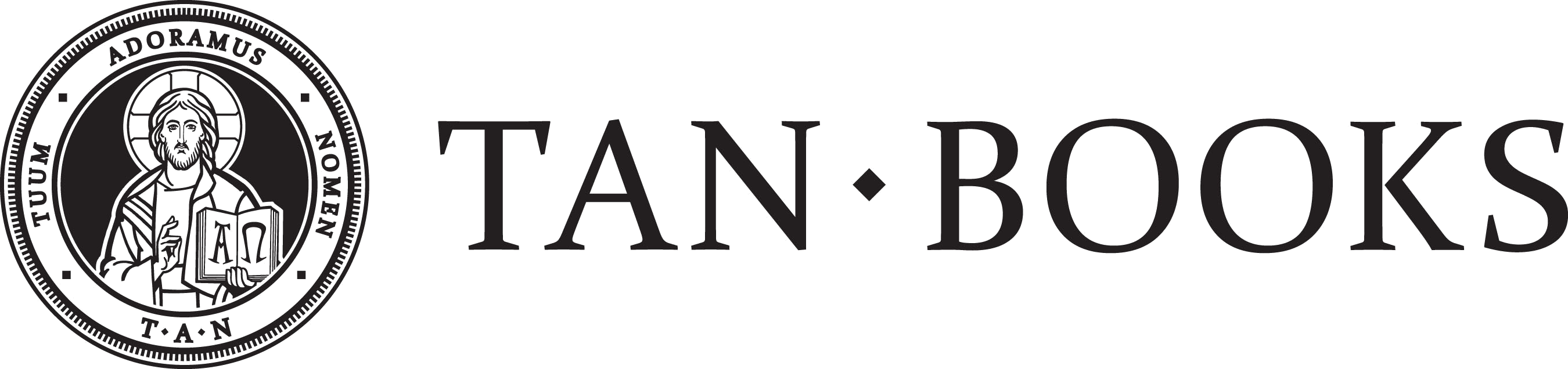
- Parent company: Good Will Publishers
- Status: Active
- Predecessor: St. Benedict Press
- Founded: 1967
- Headquarters location: Gastonia, North Carolina, USA
- Key people: Conor Gallagher (CEO)
- Publication types: Books, Bibles, Missals, Prayer Cards, Spiritual Guides
- Nonfiction topics: Traditional Catholic Theology, Lives of the Saints, Spiritual Warfare, Liturgical Living, Prayer and Devotion, Biographies, Hagiographies, Mystical and Contemplative Literature, Catholic Education and Homeschooling, Apologetics, Mystical Theology, Family and Vocation, Church History and Culture
- Imprints: Confraternity of the Precious Blood; Neumann Press; American Chesterton Society
- Official website: www.tanbooks.com

TAN Books is an American traditionalist Catholic book publishing and distribution company dedicated to preserving and promoting the perennial teachings of the Church. Founded in 1967 and now based in North Carolina, TAN specializes in classic Catholic literature, spiritual formation, and educational resources for individuals and families seeking to grow in holiness.

== History ==
TAN Books was founded in 1967 as TAN Books and Publishers in Rockford, Illinois, by Thomas Aquinas Nelson (not to be confused with the founder of the Bible-publishing firm Thomas Nelson) to keep in print books teaching traditionalist Catholicism in the wake of the Second Vatican Council. Over the next 40 years, TAN published hundreds of new and classic titles on theology, Scripture, Church history, traditional devotions (including St. Louis de Montfort’s The Secret of the Rosary, which was printed in more than 4 million copies), and the lives of saints, many of which were reprints of titles from noteworthy American Catholic publishers such as Benziger Brothers and B. Herder Book Company. TAN began publishing the Douay–Rheims Bible in 1971.

Saint Benedict Press acquired TAN in 2008. “TAN Books and Publishers” became “TAN Books” after its acquisition, with the “TAN” acronym now standing for Tuum Adoramus Nomen (Latin for “Let Us Adore Thy Name”).

== Imprints ==
TAN Books: Publishes reprints of classic Catholic works on theology, Scripture, traditional devotions, the Tridentine Mass, and lives of the saints, as well as new titles on these subjects by contemporary authors and a line of newly-typeset Douay–Rheims Bibles (co-branded with Saint Benedict Press). In addition, the former "Saint Benedict Press Classics" series is now marketed under the "TAN Classics" moniker. TAN has also, in recent years, published resources aimed toward Catholic homeschooling families; the company has also released a line of audiobooks for some of its new and classic titles.

Confraternity of the Precious Blood: TAN currently serves as the distributor of titles issued by the Confraternity (associated with the Brooklyn-based Sisters Adorers of the Precious Blood), including My Daily Bread, My Imitation of Christ, My Daily Psalm Book, and Christ in the Gospel.

Neumann Press: Acquired by TAN Books in 2013, Neumann Press republishes classic Catholic children's works, history books, and novels aimed at students from primary to secondary school.

American Chesterton Society: Since May 2015, TAN Books has been the exclusive distributor of works published by the Society, which specializes in contemporary titles written in the tradition of Catholic philosopher G. K. Chesterton.

== See also ==
- List of book distributors
