= Word on Fire =

Catholic media organization

- Founder: Robert Barron
- Founded at: Des Plaines, Illinois, U.S.
- Type: Non-profit Catholic new media organization
- Headquarters: Rochester, Minnesota, U.S.
- Chief executive officer: Stephen Grunow
- Affiliations: Catholic Church
- Website: wordonfire.org

Word on Fire is a Catholic media organization founded by Bishop Robert Barron that uses digital and traditional media to introduce Catholicism to the broader world. It rose to prominence through Barron's work as a priest engaging with new media, and has been noted as an effective model for sharing information about Catholicism to the public. The organization is holds studios and office space in Rochester (Minnesota) where Barron serves as bishop of the Diocese of Winona-Rochester.

== Media formats ==
Barron initially worked through radio and television, hosting the Word on Fire radio show on Relevant Radio and the Word on Fire with Father Barron television show on WGN America. Barron eventually expanded to online distribution through social media, and is active in distributing videos on YouTube. In addition to this, Word on Fire distributes media, such as DVDs and books, for individual and group study.

In 2025, Word on Fire was selected, along with Ascension Press, to be one of two publishers for the 2nd American edition of the Liturgy of the Hours.

== Catholicism series (2011) ==
In 2011, Word on Fire published Catholicism, a ten-part video documentary series that explores the cultural, spiritual, and historical elements of Catholicism. Offered on DVD, the series was also broadcast on PBS stations, prompting PBS's ombudsmen to issue a statement clarifying to the public that it was neither distributed by PBS nor produced using PBS funding, the latter of which was expressed as a concern by PBS viewers.

The series has received much praise from figures like papal biographer George Weigel, Cardinal Timothy Dolan, and Cardinal Francis George for its effort in pursuing the new evangelization in the modern world.

== See also ==
- Ascension (publisher)
- Augustine Institute
- Ignatius Press
- Saint Benedict Press
