= Ascension (publisher) =

Catholic publishing and media company

- Status: Active
- Founded: 1998; 28 years ago
- Country of origin: United States
- Headquarters location: Exton, Pennsylvania
- Distribution: Worldwide
- Key people: Jonathan Strate (President)
- Publication types: Books, Bibles, educational materials, podcasts, videos, and apps
- Nonfiction topics: Catholicism, Bible study, Catechesis, prayer, and theology
- Official website: ascensionpress.com

Ascension (also known as Ascension Press) is an American Catholic publishing and media company based in Exton, Pennsylvania. Founded in 1998, its productions include The Bible in a Year, The Catechism in a Year, Ascension Presents, and the Ascension app.

== History ==
Ascension Press was founded in 1998. Its first publication was Did Adam and Eve Have Belly Buttons?

The company subsequently published The Great Adventure, a Catholic Bible study program developed by Jeff Cavins. The program presents salvation history through a chronological framework known as the Bible Timeline and became the basis for parish studies, youth resources, and The Great Adventure Catholic Bible used in The Bible in a Year.

Ascension later expanded publishing to include books and formation resources on Scripture, sacramental preparation, theology, prayer, marriage, and religious education.

In 2015, Ascension launched Ascension Presents on YouTube. During the early 2020s, it expanded into daily podcasts and an app, launching The Bible in a Year in 2021 and both The Catechism in a Year and the Ascension app in 2023.

Ascension was ranked eighth on Fortune's 2024 list of the 100 Best Small Workplaces in the United States and 52nd in 2025.

== Publishing ==
Ascension publishes Catholic books, Bibles, catechetical resources, and study programs.

Ascension published the Catechism of the Catholic Church, Ascension Edition in 2022. The edition uses a color-coded system for the Catechism's four pillars. It received first place in the general-interest category of the Association of Catholic Publishers’ 2023 Excellence in Publishing Awards and was subsequently named the association’s Resource of the Year.

Later that year, following the closure of the publishing division of the United States Conference of Catholic Bishops, Ascension was selected to sell certain remaining USCCB titles.

In 2025, Ascension and Word on Fire were selected to publish editions of the second English edition of the Liturgy of the Hours.

Later in 2025, the USCCB selected Ascension as one of the publishers of the new liturgical edition of the New American Bible Revised Edition, which will be called the Catholic American Bible. Ascension announced plans to publish the translation in several formats.

== Podcasts and digital media ==
Ascension produces Catholic podcasts, videos, and digital study resources. Ascension Presents, launched in 2015, is a YouTube channel featuring educational and devotional videos about Catholic theology, morality, prayer, Scripture, and religious practice. Fr. Mike Schmitz became one of the channel’s main presenters.

The Bible in a Year with Fr. Mike Schmitz and featuring Jeff Cavins, began in January 2021. The podcast follows a 365-day reading plan based on the Great Adventure Bible Timeline. It reached number one on Apple Podcasts in the United States shortly after its launch and remained at the top of the chart for 17 consecutive days. Ascension reported that the podcast surpassed one billion worldwide downloads in March 2026.

The format was subsequently adapted into Spanish, Malayalam, Hungarian, and Slovak editions.

In January 2023, Ascension launched The Catechism in a Year, also hosted by Fr. Mike Schmitz. The podcast presents the complete text of the Catechism of the Catholic Church through 365 daily episodes and reached number one on Apple Podcasts following its debut.

Other productions include The Rosary in a Year, hosted by Fr. Mark-Mary Ames, and The Bible in 10 Minutes, an animated overview of the biblical narrative.

In 2026, Ascension announced The Bible in a Year: Family Edition, a daily video podcast hosted by Fr. Josh Johnson and designed for families with children beginning January 1, 2027.

The Ascension app provides access to biblical and catechetical texts, podcasts, reading plans, commentary, and related study materials.

== See also ==
- Augustine Institute
- Ignatius Press
- Our Sunday Visitor
- Saint Benedict Press
- Word on Fire
- The Bible in 10 Minutes
