= Kimberly Hahn =

American Catholic apologist and writer (born 1957)

Kimberly Hahn (née Kirk; born 1957) is an American Catholic apologist and author, and member of the Steubenville City Council. She is the eldest child of Jerry and Patricia Kirk, and is married to apologist and author Scott Hahn.

Hahn was born into a Presbyterian family and her father was a minister. She studied Communication Arts at Grove City College in Pennsylvania, graduating in 1979. She married fellow student Scott Hahn on August 18 that year. She then worked as a secretary for a year while her husband began studies for a Master of Divinity degree at Gordon-Conwell Theological Seminary. She enrolled the following year and earned a Master of Arts in Theology in 1982.

While studying for her M.A., Hahn carried out research into the history of Christian attitudes towards contraception. She discovered that every Christian Church without exception had condemned the practice until 1930, and that some of the most famous Protestant reformers — Luther, Calvin, Zwingli, and Knox — had condemned it strongly. She also read Catholic author John Kippley, who likened contraception to the practice of feasting and deliberately vomiting. At that stage, Scott and Kimberly both had strong objections to many Catholic teachings, but, after prayer, Bible study, and reflection, they both became convinced that on that issue, at least, the Catholic position was biblical. They changed to Natural Family Planning for a while, then decided to leave the timing of pregnancies entirely to God. Their first son, Michael, was born in 1982.

Scott was received into the Catholic Church at Easter 1986. His reception caused a great deal of distress to Kimberly, as described in their book, Rome Sweet Home. However, after struggling for a few more years with issues such as transubstantiation and, in particular, the veneration of Mary, she was herself received into the Catholic Church at Easter 1990. She is now a well-known Catholic apologist, a homeschooling mother of six children, and author of three books. She gives talks about Catholicism, feminism, and contraception, both nationally and internationally.

On November 3, 2015, Hahn was elected to the Steubenville City Council as Councilwoman-at-Large, winning with 56% of the vote citywide. She sits on the Service, Planning, Transportation and Economic Development Committees of Council. She has 23 Grandchildren.

== Publications ==
Books:

- Rome Sweet Home (co-written with Scott Hahn), Ignatius Press, 1993. ISBN 0-89870-478-2
- Catholic Education Homeward Bound (co-written with Mary Hasson), Ignatius Press, 1996. ISBN 0-89870-566-5
- Life-Giving Love (co-written with Scott Hahn), Charis Books, 2001. ISBN 1-56955-292-4
- Genesis to Jesus (co-written with Michael Barber), Servant Books, 2007. ISBN 978-0-86716-837-2
- Chosen and Cherished: Biblical Wisdom for Your Marriage, Servant Books, 2007. ISBN 978-0-86716-848-8

Audio cassettes:

- Knowing the Will of God (Whispers of the Soul), 1997. ISBN 1-57058-155-X
- Catholic Marriage Covenant (with Scott Hahn, 1997). ISBN 1-57058-076-6
- Life-Giving Love (with Scott Hahn, 1997). ISBN 1-57058-019-7
- Secrets For Successful Evangelization (with Scott Hahn, 1999). ISBN 1-57058-081-2
- Unser Weg nach Rom (Our Way to Rome) (with Scott Hahn, 2001). ISBN 3-7171-1069-1
- The Venerable Beads (with Scott Hahn, 2002). ISBN 1-57058-391-9
- A Kingdom Divided (with Scott Hahn, 2002). ISBN 1-57058-429-X
- Women of Courage - Women of Hope, Saint Joseph Communications, 2003. ISBN 1-57058-548-2
