= Carl E. Olson =

American non-fiction author (born 1969)

Carl E. Olson (born April 17, 1969) is an American theologian, a Christian apologist and non-fiction author.

== Early life and education ==
Olson was born in Hot Springs, Montana, and raised in Plains, Montana. After graduating from high school in 1987, he studied graphic design and fine art for two years at Phoenix Institute of Technology and Northwest Nazarene College. He then attended Briercrest Bible College in Saskatchewan, Canada from 1989 to 1991, graduating with an associate degree. In the fall of 1991 he moved to Portland, Oregon, where he worked as a graphic designer and illustrator. After marrying in 1994, he converted to the Catholic Church in 1997, from what he describes as a Protestant fundamentalist organisation. In 2000, he graduated from the University of Dallas with a master's degree in theological studies.

== Career ==
Olson's first book Will Catholics Be "Left Behind? A Catholic Critique of the Rapture and Today's Prophecy Preachers was published by Ignatius Press in 2003. His second book The Da Vinci Hoax was co-authored with Sandra Miesel and was published in June 2004. He also wrote the Introduction to Pied Piper of Atheism: Philip Pullman and Children's Fantasy (Ignatius Press, 2008), which was co-authored by Miesel and Pete Vere. His third book Did Jesus Really Rise From the Dead? Questions and Answers About the Life, Death, and Resurrection of Jesus was published in 2016, as well as Called To Be the Children of God: The Catholic Theology of Human Deification, which he co-edited with Fr. David Vincent Meconi, S.J.

Olson is the editor of The Catholic World Report and Ignatius Insight, the online magazine of Ignatius Press. He is a frequent contributor to the Catholic newspaper Our Sunday Visitor, for which he writes a weekly Scripture column titled "Opening the Word." He has written hundreds of articles, book reviews, and columns for a variety of periodicals and newspapers, including First Things, National Catholic Register, and Catholic Answers Magazine. In addition to his writing, Olson has appeared on Fox, BBC Radio, CNN, EWTN, and other television and radio networks.

Olson lives in Eugene, Oregon, with his wife and two children.

== Books ==
- Carl E. Olson and Sandra Miesel, The Da Vinci Hoax: Exposing the Errors in the Da Vinci Code, Ignatius Press, 2004;
- Carl E. Olson, Will Catholics Be Left Behind? A Critique of the Rapture and Today's Prophecy Preachers, Ignatius Press, 2009;
- Carl E. Olson and David V. Meconi SJ, Called to Be the Children of God: The Catholic Theology of Human Deification, Ignatius Press, 2016;
- Carl E. Olson, Did Jesus Really Rise from the Dead? Questions and Answers about the Life, Death, and Resurrection of Jesus, Ignatius Press, 2016;
- Carl E. Olson, Praying the Our Father in Lent, Catholic Truth Society, 2021;
- Carl E. Olson, Prepare the Way of the Lord, Catholic Truth Society, 2021.
