= The Catholic World Report =

Catholic news magazine

- Editor: Carl E. Olson
- Categories: Catholic Church
- Frequency: Monthly
- Total circulation: 21,000 (1999)
- Founder: Joseph Fessio
- First issue: 1991
- Final issue: December 2011 (print)
- Company: Ignatius Press
- Website: catholicworldreport.com
- ISSN: 1058-8159
- OCLC: 1096926243

The Catholic World Report is an international news magazine published by Ignatius Press that covers issues related to the Catholic Church. It was founded by Joseph Fessio in 1991 as a print monthly. Its circulation was approximately 20,000 in 1995. From December 2011 it ceased print publication and transitioned to an online-only format. Its editors have included Robert Moynihan (1991–1993), Philip Lawler (1993–2005), Domenico Bettinelli, George Neumayr, and Carl E. Olson (2012–present).

CWR is often characterised as a conservative publication. Andrew Brown, a religion correspondent for The Independent, described it in 1993 as "a right-wing Catholic news magazine with an excellent record for accuracy". It has been a vocal critic of clerical sex abuse and associated corruption in the Catholic Church since the early 1990s. It campaigned against the liturgical use of the New American Bible Revised Edition, a modern translation which uses gender-neutral language.
