= Augustine Institute =

American Catholic theology graduate school

- Other name: AI
- Motto: Fecisti Nos Ad Te (Latin)
- Motto in English: You Have Made Us for Yourself
- Type: Private Catholic non-profit coeducational
- Established: 2005
- Religious affiliation: Catholic
- Academic affiliations: ATS
- President: Timothy C. Gray
- Provost: Christopher Blum
- Faculty: 24
- Students: 550
- Location: 16805 New Halls Ferry Road, Florissant, Missouri, US
- Campus: Urban
- Colors: Gold & blue
- Website: www.augustineinstitute.org

The Augustine Institute (AI) is a private Catholic graduate theology school. Located in Florissant, Missouri, the school offers master's degree programs and distributes Catholic media materials, including the Catholic Standard Version (CSV), a new Bible translation.

== History ==
Jonathan Reyes founded the Augustine Institute in Denver in 2005, in response to post-modern culture inspired by Pope John Paul II's call for a New Evangelization.

On May 19, 2007, the first class of 11 students graduated. In 2012, AI relocated from Teikyo Loretto Heights to Greenwood Village in the Denver Tech Center. As of Fall 2019, it had 328 enrolled students or 144.1 full-time-equivalent, the third-largest Catholic lay ecclesial ministry program in the United States.

In 2015, the Augustine Institute merged with Lighthouse Catholic Media in "a new strategic alliance."

In April 2024, the Augustine Institute acquired the 284-acre former Boeing Leadership Center (BLC) in Florissant, Missouri. The institute transitioned its operations to the new campus, with its headquarters and Graduate School of Theology opening in time for the fall 2024 semester.

== Academics ==
The Augustine Institute offers four graduate degree programs: MA in Theology, MA in Pastoral Theology, MA in Catholic Education, and MA in Biblical Studies. With the exception of the MA in Biblical Studies, all of the degree programs can be earned either on campus or through distance education.

The MA in Theology degree curriculum focuses on the theological foundations for effective catechesis and evangelization. The required core curriculum consists of eight courses that provide students with a foundation in Theology, Evangelization, Sacred Scripture, and Church History. In addition, students have four elective options. The institute also offers MA Theology students an optional Concentration in Sacred Scripture, which includes additional requirements.

The MA in Pastoral Theology was renamed and made available online in 2022. It consists of twelve courses, nine required and three elective. What distinguishes this program from others is the way it is based on the four pillars of priestly and religious formation: (1) Theological Formation; (2) Spiritual Formation; (3) Pastoral, Evangelistic, and Catechetical Formation, and (4) Human Formation.

The MA in Catholic Education was launched in 2023 with the aim of contributing to "the ongoing renewal of Catholic schools," according to the school's Provost, Christopher Blum. The program is "grounded in Scripture and Catholic doctrine" and "offers pedagogical training from a Catholic and classical perspective."

The MA in Biblical Studies is offered only on campus and involves a 2 year, 48-unit-credit-hour program of study. The curriculum includes 16 courses, including language courses, courses in exegesis and the theological framework of Biblical interpretation, and two electives. Enrollment requirements include an "undergraduate degree in a related field or demonstrably strong formation in humanities, philosophy, and theology"; a cumulative GPA of 3.70 or higher, and a competitive GRE score.

=== Authorization and Accreditation ===
The Colorado Department of Higher Education authorizes the Augustine Institute to grant degrees. In October 2018, the Colorado Commission on Higher Education renewed the Augustine Institute's authorization.

As of 2025, the Augustine Institute is fully accredited by the Association of Theological Schools in the United States and Canada and approved for comprehensive distance education.

=== Educational Philosophy ===
Inspired by St. Augustine of Hippo's approach to theology and evangelization, the Institute "is committed to the pursuit of wisdom in service of Christian mission." It describes its distance education program as taking place "through high-definition videos, live-streamed interactive course offerings, telephone calls, promptly answered emails, lively online discussion, and substantive feedback on assignments." The vision of distance education it proposes has been described as representing "creative fidelity to the Catholic tradition."

The Augustine Institute's programs emphasize fidelity to the magisterium, especially as expressed in the apostolic constitution Ex corde Ecclesiae. Some Catholic dioceses use the institute's academic programs to help train their permanent deacons. The school stays closely connected to its local Catholic bishop, who is a member of the institute's Board of Trustees.

== Publications ==
The Augustine Institute publishes Faith & Culture: The Journal of the Augustine Institute.

In addition to producing study guides and leader guides to accompany video programs, the Augustine Institute publishes books in partnership with Ignatius Press, including the What Every Catholic Should Know series. The Augustine Institute also publishes the English Standard Version Catholic Edition Bible in North America in partnership with Crossway Books. In 2022, the Institute published the Gospel of Matthew of its new Catholic Standard Version translation, the first step in a plan to "publish elegant editions of the four Gospels, the Psalms, and other important portions of Scripture," culminating in a complete CSV Bible translation.

=== Faculty publications ===
- Michael Patrick Barber, The Historical Jesus and the Temple: Memory, Methodology, and the Gospel of Matthew (Cambridge University Press, 2023).
- Mark Giszczak, Wisdom of Solomon, Catholic Commentary on Sacred Scripture (Grand Rapids: Baker Academic, 2024).
- Elizabeth Klein, Augustine's Theology of Angels (Cambridge: Cambridge University Press, 2018).
- Brant Pitre, Jesus and Divine Christology (Grand Rapids: Eerdmans, 2024).
- Brant Pitre and Michael P. Barber (with John Kincaid, not a member of the AI Faculty), Paul, A New Covenant Jew: Rethinking Pauline Theology (Grand Rapids: Eerdmans, 2019).
- James B. Prothro, The Bible and Reconciliation: Confession, Repentance, and Restoration, Catholic Biblical Theology of the Sacraments Series (Grand Rapids: Baker Academic, 2023).
- James B. Prothro, A Pauline Theology of Justification: Forgiveness, Friendship, and Life in Christ, Lectio Sacra (Eugene: Cascade Books, 2023).

== Media ==
Founded in 2015, through a partnership with Ignatius Press and Lighthouse Catholic Media, the Augustine Institute operates a video, audio and ebook platform for Catholic content called Formed, which reaches over 5,000 parishes and one million subscribers "with content from 75 Catholic content providers, making it the largest collaboration of Catholic apostolates, parishes, diocese and organizations worldwide." The Formed platform is used by many Catholic parishes to facilitate their catechetical efforts and train group leaders with Bible studies, sacramental preparation and faith formation programs.

The Augustine Institute also houses "a team of creative storytellers who craft captivating cinematic experiences" called Augustine Institute Studios. Their multi-part video productions include The Search (2020), Presence: The Mystery of the Eucharist (2018), Signs of Grace (2018), Divine Mercy in the Second Greatest Story Ever Told (2016), Forgiven (2016), Beloved (2015), Reborn (2015), and Symbolon (2014).

The Augustine Institute Radio Theatre has produced four audio drama series: Brother Francis: The Barefoot Saint of Assisi (2016), The Trials of St. Patrick (2017), Ode to Saint Cecilia (2017), and The Legends of Robin Hood (2019). The 10-part audio drama, Brother Francis, won the 2018 Audie Award for Audio Drama, while The Trials of St. Patrick was a finalist for the Inspirational/Faith-Based Fiction award in the same year. The audio drama, The Legends of Robin Hood, won five ATC Seneca awards for Best Original Score, Best Sound Design, Best Supporting Actor, and Best Leading Actor.

== See also ==
- Ascension (publisher)
- Ignatius Press
- Saint Benedict Press
- Word on Fire
