= Homiletic and Pastoral Review =

Catholic Clergy journal

- Cover of the January 2011 issue
- Editor: John P. Cush
- Categories: Catholicism
- Founder: Joseph F. Wagner
- Founded: 1900
- Company: Ignatius Press
- Country: United States
- Language: English
- Website: www.hprweb.com
- ISSN: 0018-4268

Homiletic and Pastoral Review (HPR), formerly the Homiletic Monthly and Catechist, is an American Catholic clerical magazine. As of 2022, the editor-in-chief was Fr John Cush, professor of theology at Saint Joseph's Seminary in Yonkers, New York. Founded in 1900, HPR is one of the most well-respected pastoral journals in the world and the first of its kind in America. At its height, the paper edition of the journal was carried by 191 university libraries. It has featured noted contributors such as James V. Schall, Alice von Hildebrand, Paul Vitz, Kenneth Whitehead, Donald DeMarco, Regis Scanlon, and John F. Harvey.

== History ==
In 1900 Joseph F. Wagner decided to start a magazine for the Catholic clergy in the U.S.A. He called it The Homiletic Monthly and Catechist, the name it carried until it was changed to the present name in 1919. The format was always simple: each issue included a sample sermon for each Sunday and Feast Day along with some aids for teaching catechism to children. It stayed that way until 1919.

Editor until 1916 was Msgr. John F. Brady of St. Joseph's Seminary in Dunwoodie, N.Y., the seminary of the Archdiocese of New York. He was succeeded by two Dominican friars, Fathers John A. McHugh, O.P. and Charles J. Callan, O.P. They changed the name of the periodical to The Homiletic and Pastoral Review (HPR) because they wanted to offer more than sermons. They expanded the scope of HPR, adding articles, official church documents, a "Questions Answered" section and book reviews.

Their tenure was exceptional in the annals of Catholic journalism in the United States. Fr. McHugh was co-editor for 34 years when he died in 1950. Fr. Callan carried on as sole editor until 1957, when Father Adian M. Carr, O.F.M. Conv., started as associate editor. Beginning in 1957, Fr. Carr wrote editorials that appear on the last page of every issues; this tradition has remained in place until today.

Fr. Callan retired in 1961 and Fr. Carr became the new editor. Callan's tenure had lasted 45 years. In addition to their editorial work, Callan and McHugh founded a parish in Hawthorne, N.Y. and taught at the Maryknoll Seminary in Ossining, N.Y. Both being scholars, they also published 30 books on Scripture and Theology.

In 1970 Fr. Carr received permission to leave the Franciscans and join the Trappist monks in Monks Corner, S.C. (Within five years he was named Prior of the abbey, and a few years after that he was elected Abbot.) The last issue of HPR he edited was April 1970. For three months there was no editor until John F. Wagner, president of the company, appointed Msgr. Vincent A. Yzermans of Freeport, Minn., who served as editor until 1971. Fr. Kenneth Baker assumed editorship in April 1971 and remained in this position until 2010. In the spring of 2010, Fr. David Vincent Meconi, S.J., became editor of HPR and served as such for a dozen years until leaving the priesthood after credible allegations of sexual abuse of a minor. Notably, Fr. Meconi announced in October 2011 that the print version of the Homiletic and Pastoral Review would be discontinued at the end of the year. An online version continues.

== Today ==
The journal is currently owned and published by Ignatius Press, which purchased it in 1995.

In September 2022, the Reverend John P. Cush was named editor-in-chief. He is joined by Sister Mary Micaela Hoffman, associate editor; Mr. Christopher Siuzdak, book review editor; and S.E. Greydanus, managing editor.
