= Lorraine Murray =

American novelist and columnist

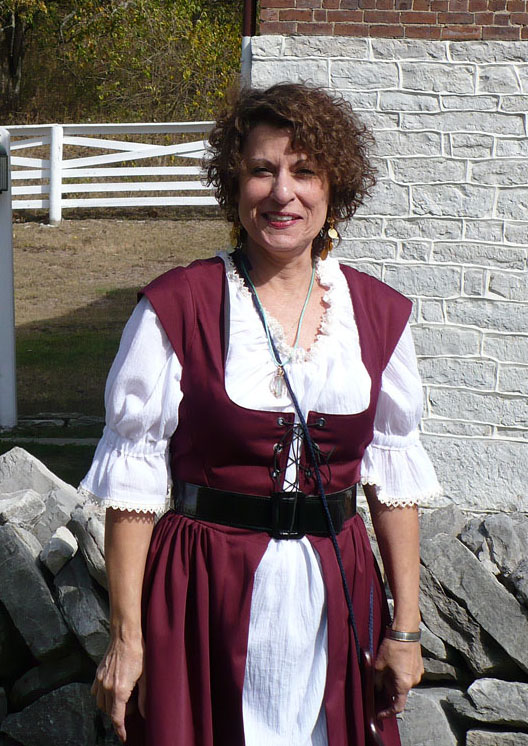
- Occupations: Author; Columnist
- Writing career
- Genre: Religious

Lorraine Grace Viscardi Murray is an American author and columnist.

== Life ==
Murray was born in Yonkers, New York and grew up in Miami. She received her bachelor's degree in English from the University of Florida and was elected to Phi Beta Kappa. She received her doctorate in philosophy from the University of Florida.

A radical feminist and atheist for over 20 years, she returned to Catholicism in her forties, a conversion journey she wrote about in her book, Confessions of an Ex-Feminist. Her other books include How Shall We Celebrate?, Why Me? Why Now?: Finding Hope When You Have Breast Cancer, and Grace Notes: Embracing the Joy of Christ in a Broken World. She has also written a biography of Southern writer Flannery O'Connor, "The Abbess of Andalusia: Flannery O'Connor's Spiritual Journey." She also wrote three cozy mystery novels featuring amateur detective Francesca Bibbo. These are Death in the Choir, Death of a Liturgist, and Death Dons a Mask. Her essays on Christian themes appear in the Atlanta Journal-Constitution, The Georgia Bulletin, and the National Catholic Register. She is the widow of Tolkien artist Jef Murray, who died in 2015.

She won the first place Catholic Press Association award for "Best regular column - family life" in 2014.

She won the second place Catholic Press Association award for "Best regular column – general commentary" in 2006.

== Bibliography ==
- Grace Notes: Embracing the Joy of Christ in a Broken World (2002). Resurrection Press. pp. 173. ISBN 978-1-878718-69-3
- Why Me? Why Now?: Finding Hope When You Have Breast Cancer (2003). Ave Maria Press. pp. 128. ISBN 978-0-87793-992-4
- "A Wedding Day Resurrection", Georgia Bulletin, November 16, 2006.
- Confessions of an Ex-Feminist (2008). Ignatius Press. pp. 150. ISBN 978-1-58617-225-1
- Death in the Choir (2009). Tumblar House. pp. 186. ISBN 978-0-9791600-7-3
- The Abbess of Andalusia: Flannery O'Connor's Spiritual Journey (2009). Saint Benedict Press. pp. 256. ISBN 978-1-935302-16-2
- Death of a Liturgist (2010). Saint Benedict Press. pp. 224. ISBN 978-1-935302-46-9
- Death Dons a Mask (2013). Tumblar House. pp. 312. ISBN 978-0-988353-73-2
