= Criticism of The Da Vinci Code =

Controversy surrounding The Da Vinci Code

The Da Vinci Code, a popular suspense novel by Dan Brown, generated criticism and controversy after its publication in 2003. Many of the complaints centered on the book's speculations and misrepresentations of core aspects of Christianity and the history of the Catholic Church. Additional criticisms were directed toward the book's inaccurate descriptions of European art, history, architecture, and geography.

Charges of copyright infringement were leveled by the novelist Lewis Perdue and by the authors of the 1982 book The Holy Blood and the Holy Grail, which puts forward the hypothesis that the historical Jesus married Mary Magdalene, and that their children or their descendants emigrated to what is now Southern France, and married into families that became the Merovingian dynasty, whose claim to the throne of France is championed today by the Priory of Sion. In 2006, a court ruled in Brown's favor, stating that while he referenced the book in parts of his novel, he did not substantially copy it. A similar suit was filed in 2007 by author Jack Dunn, who accused Brown of plagiarizing his 1997 novel The Vatican Boys.

== Fact or fiction ==
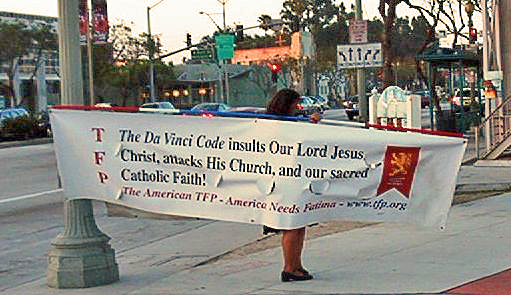
A woman protesting against The Da Vinci Code film outside a movie theater in Culver City, California. The TFP acronym in the banner stands for the American Society for the Defense of Tradition, Family and Property.

Brown prefaces his novel with a page titled "Fact" asserting that certain elements in the novel are true in reality, and a page at his website repeats these ideas and others. In the early publicity for the novel, Dan Brown made repeated assertions that, while the novel is a work of fiction, the historical information in it is all accurate and well-researched. For example:

Martin Savidge: When we talk about da Vinci and your book, how much is true and how much is fabricated in your storyline?
Dan Brown: 99 percent of it is true. All of the architecture, the art, the secret rituals, the history, all of that is true, the Gnostic gospels. All of that is … all that is fiction, of course, is that there's a Harvard symbologist named Robert Langdon, and all of his action is fictionalized. But the background is all true.

Matt Lauer: How much of this is based on reality in terms of things that actually occurred?
Dan Brown: Absolutely all of it. Obviously, there are—Robert Langdon is fictional, but all of the art, architecture, secret rituals, secret societies, all of that is historical fact.

These claims in the book and by the author, combined with the presentation of religious ideas that some Christians regard as offensive, led to a great deal of controversy and debate, which found its way into political discourse in the media. In May 2006, The Independent reported that Ruth Kelly, a senior British Government Minister, had been scrutinized about her membership in Opus Dei during her early years as an Education Secretary.

== Religious disputes ==
=== Mary Magdalene ===
The novel asserts that Mary Magdalene was of the Tribe of Benjamin, but historians dispute this claim, and there is no mention of this in the Bible or in other ancient sources. According to Sandra Miesel and Carl E. Olson, writing in their 2004 book, The Da Vinci Hoax, state the fact that Magdala was located in northern Israel, whereas the tribe of Benjamin resided in the south, weighs against it.

In Chapter 58 it is suggested that the marriage of Jesus and Mary Magdalene created a "potent political union with the potential of making a legitimate claim to the throne." Olson and Miesel not only state that this assertion is without any historical basis, but question why Solomon's kingship would have any purpose or meaning today that would motivate a large-scale conspiracy. The authors also question why if Jesus were merely a "mortal prophet", as the novel suggests, a royal goddess would have any interest in him. Olson and Miesel quote Chicago archbishop Francis Cardinal George, who remarked, "Jesus isn't God but Mary Magdalene is a goddess? I mean, what does that mean? If he's not God, why is he married to a goddess?" Olson and Miesel also argued that having Davidic blood in Jesus' time would not have been unique, since all of his stepfather Joseph's relatives, which included twenty generations of kings of Judah, had it as well. The authors also state that the Benjamites were not considered "rightful" heirs to the throne; that the New Testament does not mention Mary Magdalene's tribal affiliation; that she was likely not from the tribe of Benjamin; and that her connection with that tribe is traced to the 1982 book Holy Blood, Holy Grail, which does not substantiate the idea.

Characters in the book also claim that Mary Magdalene was labeled a prostitute by the Church. This stems from a controversy about the identity of one or more persons mentioned in the New Testament. The Latin Church traditionally identified Mary Magdalene, Mary of Bethany, and the unnamed "sinful woman" who anoints Jesus's feet in Luke 7:36–50, as referring to the same person. Eastern and Protestant churches have traditionally interpreted them as referring to two or three different individuals. The unnamed woman caught in adultery from John's gospel has also often been identified with the unnamed sinful woman of Luke's gospel. The conflation of these figures is now rejected by the majority of biblical scholars, regardless of tradition. But Pope Gregory I gave famous sermons based on this identification in the late 6th century, and for many centuries it remained a popular exegetical opinion. The identification was a major controversy in the years leading up to the Reformation, and some Protestant leaders rejected it. During the Counter-Reformation, the Catholic Church emphasized Mary Magdalene as a model of penance. Catholic doctrine has never definitively held that Mary of Bethany or the unnamed women should be identified with Mary Magdalene. There is no evidence that this opinion was used to defame Mary, who was and still is considered a saint to whose honor churches have been built. She is also respected as a witness to Christ's resurrection as written in the Gospels.

==== Alleged marriage to Jesus ====
The story claims the "Holy Grail" is not a chalice but a bloodline sprung from the marital union of Jesus and Mary Magdalene. This idea is not original to Brown; it was previously hypothesized by others, including Michael Baigent and Richard Leigh in The Holy Blood and the Holy Grail. Many textual and historical scholars have characterized this claim as unsupported by evidence.

Women in the Gospels were usually identified with husbands or male relatives, especially if they shared their names with others. For example, there are many mentions of women called "Mary", all designated differently (any possible identification with each other nonwithstanding). There is Mary "the mother of Jesus", Mary Magdalene, Mary "the mother of James and Joses", Mary "[the mother] of James", "the other" Mary, Mary "the wife of Cl[e]opas" and Mary of Bethany, the sister of Lazarus and Martha. Mary Magdalene stands out from most of the other Marys as she is not directly associated with any man. Mary "Magdalene" means "Mary of Magdala", just as Jesus "the Nazarene" means "Jesus of Nazareth." Some researchers have claimed that, if indeed she was married to Jesus, she would have been designated, following custom, Mary "the wife of Jesus" instead.

According to The Da Vinci Hoax, the use of the term "bride of Christ" for the Church in some of the letters of Paul (Ephesians 5:25–27, 2 Corinthians 11:2–3) and the Book of Revelation suggests that Jesus was not married. The authors of that work also speculate that the recorded words of Jesus that "those people who can remain celibate, for the kingdom of heaven's sake should do so" (Matt. 19:12) were made in response to criticisms of his own celibacy.

In the novel, a line of the Gospel of Philip is quoted where Mary Magdalene is referred to as Jesus's "companion", and a character of The Da Vinci Code says that Aramaic scholars know that this means "wife". James M. Robinson, an authority on the Gnostic gospels, has responded to this passage by pointing out that "companion" was not necessarily a sex-related term; the English term derives from an Old French one, itself actually derived from the Late Latin "companionem", an accusative form of the term "companio", originally referring to someone one broke bread with at a table, or a messmate — panis being the Latin word for "bread". In addition, "the Gospel of Philip is in Coptic, translated from Greek, so there is no word in the text for Aramaic scholars to consider. The Gospel of Philip depicts Mary as Jesus's koinonos, a Greek term indicating a 'close friend', 'companion' or, potentially, a lover. In the context of Gnostic beliefs, Gnostic writings use Mary to illustrate a disciple's spiritual relationship with Jesus, making any physical relationship irrelevant."

==== Mary Magdalene in Leonardo's The Last Supper ====
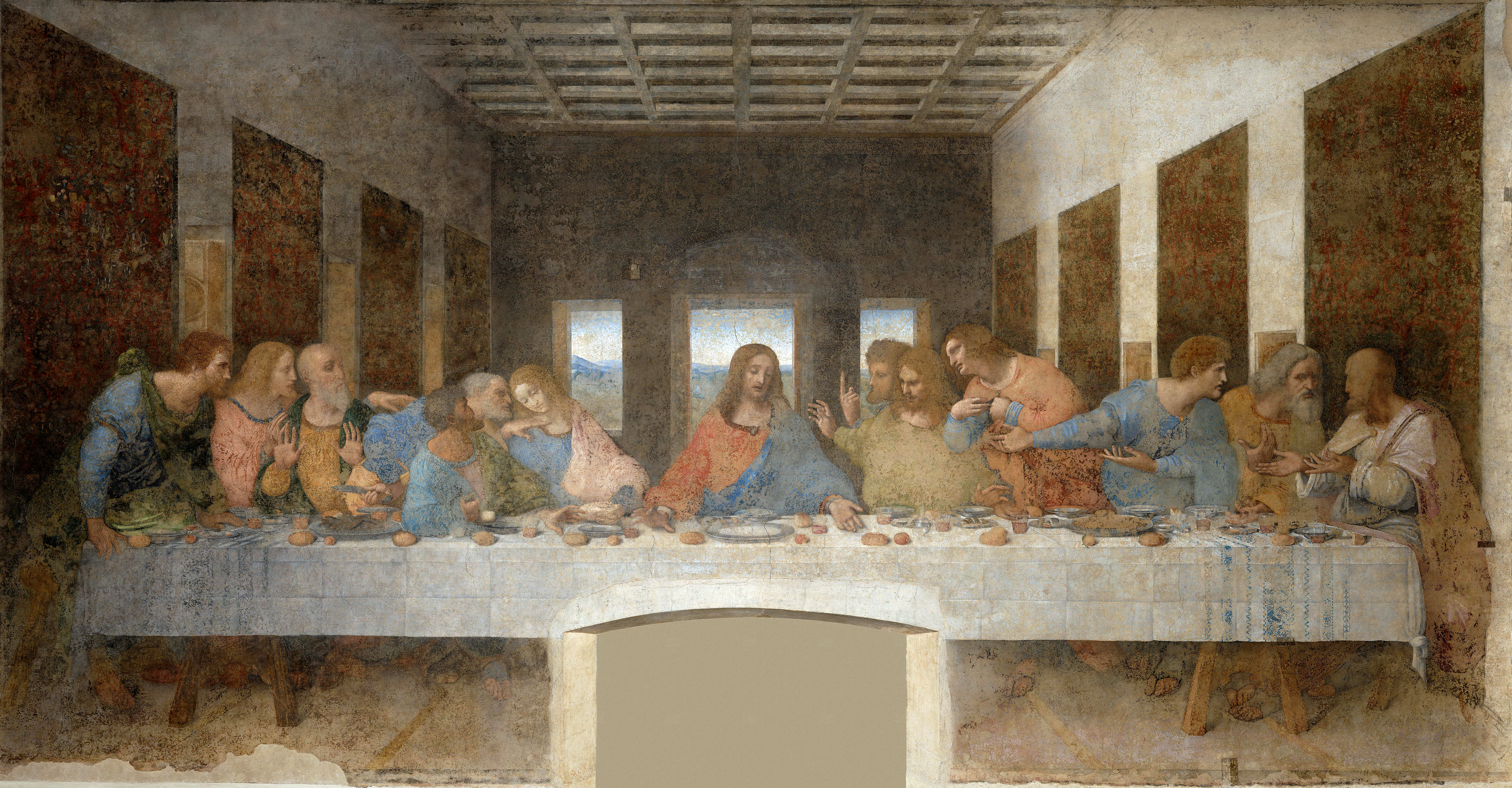
The Last Supper

Many art historians dispute that Leonardo da Vinci's famous The Last Supper depicts Mary Magdalene beside Jesus.

=== Jesus in Church teaching ===
According to Sir Leigh Teabing in Chapter 55 of the novel, the early Church consolidated its power by suppressing ideas about the sacred feminine and elevating the mortal prophet Jesus into a divine being. The novel claims that belief in Jesus's divinity was established at the First Council of Nicaea. According to Religion Facts, the questions discussed by the Council were not whether he was divine, as the New Testament authors already believe that he was, but what his precise relationship to God was. In particular, the Council decided upon the question of whether Jesus was homoousios, "of one substance" with God the Father, or whether instead Jesus was the first created being, inferior to the Father but like him, but still superior to all other beings (see Arianism), or whether he was merely of like substance to the father, or homoiousios.

=== Portrayal of Gnosticism ===
The novel claims Constantine wanted Christianity to unify the Roman Empire but thought it would appeal to pagans only if it featured a demigod similar to pagan heroes, so he destroyed the Gnostic Gospels that said Jesus was a human prophet and promoted the gospels of Matthew, Mark, Luke and John, which portray Jesus as divine.

Historically, however, Gnosticism did not portray Jesus as merely human. In fact, the Gnostic Jesus was less human than the Jesus of orthodox Christianity. While orthodox Christianity generally considered Christ both divine and human, many Gnostic sects considered Christ purely divine, his human body being a mere illusion (see Docetism). Many Gnostics saw matter as evil, and believed that a divine spirit would never have taken on a material body. Some varieties of Gnosticism went so far as to hold that the God of the Jews is only a demiurge who has trapped humanity in a fleshly prison; and that Christ is an emanation of the true God, sent to free humanity from that bondage to the flesh. (See Marcionism, Aeon, Archon).

=== Sacred feminine ===
Characters in the book claim Christianity has suppressed the sacred feminine, the representation of the earth or mother Goddess's mystic power that's often linked to symbols of fertility and reproduction, such as Venus and Isis.

Early Christian devotion to female martyrs (such as Perpetua and Felicity) and the apocryphal writings about figures like St. Thecla seem to indicate that women did play a role in the early Church, far more than either Brown or some modern critics of Christianity acknowledge, though historical evidence does not suggest men and women shared all roles of office. The Catholic and Orthodox Churches particularly venerate the Virgin Mary, who gave birth to Jesus, but the book deems this a desexualised aspect of femininity that suppresses the sacred feminine. Brown echoes scholars such as Joseph Campbell in saying this image of Mary derives from Isis and her child Horus. Miesel and Olson counters that the "Mother and child" symbol, as a universal part of the general human experience, can be found in other faiths; so Christianity did not copy this element from Egyptian mythology.

Christian documents and traditions tend to stress the virtues of chaste womanhood in keeping with general Christian encouragement of chastity for both genders. The Gnostics were not uniformly pro-female: for example, in the Gospel of Thomas's famous ending verse where Jesus says he will make Mary into a male to make her worthy to enter the Kingdom.

=== Goddess worship ===
==== Israelites ====
While the character Robert Langdon claims in the book that early Israelites worshipped the goddess Shekinah as Yahweh's equal, this is contradictory to Jewish theology. Judaism is and was a monotheistic religion, and belief in a goddess counterpart to God is considered illogical and expressly forbidden (though there is scholarship that suggests the goddess Asherah was worshipped in pre-monotheist, Yahwist Israel and Judah as the consort of Yahweh). In fact, the term Shekinah (derived from Hebrew for "dwelling") does not appear in early Judaism at all, but later Talmudic Judaism used it to refer to the God's "dwelling" or presence among his people. The term describes a spiritual radiance. Critics argue that this comes from an understanding of Kabbalah, which speaks of God as having "male" and "female" attributes in the Sephirot.

=== The Bible ===
Carl Olson and Sandra Miesel state that contrary to the book's claims, the Gnostic Gospels (e.g. the Gospels of Thomas, Philip, Mary Magdalene, and the Judas) also do not focus more on Jesus' humanity. The other known Gospels, for the most part, treat Jesus as more otherworldly and lack the humanizing detail of the Biblical accounts. The assertion of "more than eighty gospels" written, with only the familiar four chosen as canonical, greatly exaggerates the number of Gnostic Gospels written.

The assertions that the Dead Sea Scrolls, discovered in 1947 (not the 1950s as Brown predicates), contain lost or hidden Gospels is also false. The scrolls contain books of the Hebrew Scriptures, apocryphal and pseudepigraphic books, and manuals used by the Essenes (a Jewish community) at Qumran. No definite Christian documents—orthodox, Gnostic, or otherwise—have ever been found at this site.

The texts of the Nag Hammadi library are not "the most ancient texts in Christianity", but later Gnostic texts (usually dated to the 2nd and 3rd century CE), which were written after the canonical Gospels. Contrarily to Brown's statements, these Gospels do not focus on Jesus's humanity, but depict Jesus as more otherworldly and lack the humanizing detail of the canonical Biblical accounts. The only exception to this is the Gospel of Thomas, which is a collection of sayings (logia) attributed to Jesus; however, such sayings (most of which are strikingly similar to the ones found in the Canonical Gospels) do not focus on Jesus's life nor on his humanity/divinity, but on his teachings.

=== Opus Dei ===
The depiction of Opus Dei as a monastic order which is the Pope's "personal prelature" is inaccurate. In fact, there are no monks in Opus Dei, which has primarily lay membership and whose celibate lay members are called numeraries. But it may be explained by the fact that Silas is referred to as a monk mostly by the protagonists, Langdon and Neveu, who are shown to have little knowledge of Opus Dei. The word numerary is used to refer to Silas, by actual Opus Dei members such as the person at Opus Dei centre in London. Moreover, Opus Dei encourages its lay members to avoid practices that are perceived as fundamentalist to the outside world. The term personal prelature does not refer to a special relationship to the Pope; it means an institution in which the jurisdiction of the prelate is not linked to a territory but over persons, wherever they be.

Silas, the murderous "Opus Dei monk", uses a cilice and flagellates himself. Some members of Opus Dei do practice voluntary mortification of the flesh, which has been a Christian tradition since at least St. Anthony in the third century, and it has also been practiced by Mother Teresa, Padre Pio, the child visionaries of Our Lady of Fatima, and slain archbishop Óscar Romero. Saint Thomas More and Catherine of Aragon, Queen of England both wore hairshirts in the Tudor era.

Critics have accused the book of depicting the order as misogynistic, a claim which the order's defenders say has no basis in reality because half of the leadership positions in Opus Dei are held by women.

Critics have also stated that the novel's allegations of dealings between Pope John Paul II and the order concerning the Institute for the Works of Religion also have no basis in reality. The book states that due to these dealings, Opus Dei's founder was declared a saint just 20 years after his death. In reality, Josemaría Escrivá was canonized 27 years after his death; admittedly faster than some others—but this is attributed to the streamlining of the canonization process and John Paul II's decision to make Escriva's sanctity and message known.

In the novel, the head of Opus Dei travels alone and makes momentous decisions on his own. In real life, the head of Opus Dei is usually accompanied by two other priests called custodes or guardians. Decision making in Opus Dei is "collegial": i.e., the head has only one vote.

== Historical disputes ==
=== Leonardo da Vinci ===
The contention that the Mona Lisa was painted by Leonardo da Vinci as an androgynous "whole" humanity that represented both genders is contested by Olson and Miesel's book, in which they state that reputable art historians have explained that it is simply a masterful portrait of a woman. Olson and Miesel also take issue with the idea that Leonardo painted the Mona Lisa as a self-portrait, and that this idea is based on the fact that points of congruency are found between Leonardo's face and the Mona Lisa's. Olson and Miesel respond that points of congruency can be found among many faces, which is how computer morphing of faces is facilitated.

The title of the book is not consistent with naming conventions, because "Da Vinci" was not Leonardo's surname. As Tom Chivers of The Daily Telegraph comments, "[Leonardo] was from Vinci, or of Vinci. As many critics have pointed out, calling it The Da Vinci Code is like referring to Lawrence of Arabia as Mr. Of Arabia, or asking What Would Of Nazareth Do?".

=== Knights Templar ===
The allegation that Pope Clement V burned the Templars to ashes and threw the ashes into the Tiber River in Rome is false. The last leaders of the Knights Templar were killed in France in 1314 by King Philip IV of France, being burned at the stake on a small island in the Seine. Pope Clement's administration was not in Rome as he had moved the papal headquarters to Avignon.

=== The Holy Blood and The Holy Grail ===
The legend of the Holy Grail alleged that a sacred relic (in many versions, either the cup used at the Last Supper, or the cup said to have been used by Joseph of Arimathea to collect blood of Christ – or both) existed, which would bring untold blessings to any pure knight who found it. The story appeared around the time of the Crusades and is featured in Thomas Malory's Le Morte d'Arthur. In Old French, the Holy Grail was written as San Graal. However, The Da Vinci Code, taking cues from The Holy Blood and the Holy Grail, interprets this as "Sang Réal" and translated this as "royal blood". In early Grail romances, graal in fact denotes a large dish for fish, itself a Christian religious symbol, but clearly removed from the traditional cup. The idea of a cup seems to have developed quickly during the late 12th and early 13th centuries, influenced both by non-canonical religious legends, such as that of Joseph of Arimathea, and by pagan stories involving magic containers that, for example, produced endless food.

=== France ===
Several claims about the Church of Saint-Sulpice in Paris are disputed. While there is a brass line running north–south through the church, it is not a part of the Paris Meridian. The line is instead more of a gnomon or sundial/calendar, meant to mark the solstice and equinoxes. This note has been on display in the church:

Contrary to fanciful allegations in a recent best-selling novel, this [the line in the floor] is not a vestige of a pagan temple. No such temple ever existed in this place. It was never called a Rose-Line. It does not coincide with the meridian traced through the middle of the Paris Observatory which serves as a reference for maps where longitudes are measured in degrees East or West of Paris. Please also note that the letters P and S in the small round windows at both ends of the transept refer to Peter and Sulpice, the patron saints of the church, and not an imaginary "Priory of Sion."

The reference to Paris having been founded by the Merovingians (Chapter 55) is false; in fact, the city was settled by Gauls by the 3rd century BC. The Romans, who knew it as Lutetia, captured it in 52 BC under Julius Caesar, and left substantial ruins in the city, including an amphitheater and public baths. The Merovingians did not rule in France until the 5th century AD, by which time Paris was at least 800 years old.

== Scientific disputes ==
Brown characterized the cycle of Venus as "trac[ing] a perfect pentacle across the ecliptic sky every four years". This was corrected to "eight years" in some later editions, such as the British paperback and the April 2003 printing of the US hardback.

Steve Olson, author of Mapping Human History: Genes, Race, and Our Common Origins, writing in an article in Nature, says that the notion that a small number of people living today could be the only descendants from any particular person who lived millennia ago, such as Jesus and Mary, is statistically flawed. According to Olson, "If anyone living today is descended from Jesus, so are most of us on the planet."

== Allegations of plagiarism ==
A number of copyright infringement lawsuits have been brought alleging plagiarism in The Da Vinci Code.

=== Lewis Perdue ===
On April 11, 2005, novelist Lewis Perdue sued Brown and his publisher Random House for plagiarizing his novels The Da Vinci Legacy (1983) and Daughter of God (1999), claiming "there are far too many parallels between my books and The Da Vinci Code for it to be an accident." On August 4, 2005, District Judge George B. Daniels granted a motion for summary judgment and dismissed the suit, ruling that "a reasonable average lay observer would not conclude that The Da Vinci Code is substantially similar to Daughter of God. Any slightly similar elements are on the level of generalized or otherwise unprotectable ideas." He affirmed that The Da Vinci Code does not infringe upon copyrights held by Perdue.

=== Michael Baigent and Richard Leigh ===
In February 2006, Michael Baigent and Richard Leigh, two of the three authors of Holy Blood, Holy Grail, took the UK publisher of The Da Vinci Code to court for breach of copyright, alleging plagiarism. Some sources suggested the lawsuit was a publicity stunt intended to boost sales of The Holy Blood and the Holy Grail (a boost which did in fact occur). However, the projected court costs of over 1 million pounds outweigh or at least substantially reduce the financial benefit of the lawsuit.

Dan Brown repeatedly said in his defense that history cannot be plagiarized and therefore the accusations of the two authors were false. Leigh stated, "It's not that Dan Brown has lifted certain ideas because a number of people have done that before. It's rather that he's lifted the whole architecture – the whole jigsaw puzzle – and hung it on to the peg of a fictional thriller". Dan Brown has admitted some of the ideas taken from Baigent and Leigh's work were indispensable to the book but stated that there were many other sources also behind it. However, he claimed that neither he nor his wife had read Baigent and Leigh's book when he produced his original "synopsis" of the novel. Among Michael Baigent and Richard Leigh's arguments were that the given name of the character Sir Leigh Teabing's is the same of Richard Leigh's surname, and that "Teabing" is an anagram of "Baigent".

On April 7, 2006, High Court judge Sir Peter Smith rejected Baigent and Leigh's claim, ruling in favor of Random House. In his judgement, Smith explained that The Holy Blood and the Holy Grail did not have a central theme in the way its authors suggested, stating, "It was an artificial creation for the purposes of the litigation working back from the Da Vinci Code", and that while Brown did reference the previous book as a basis for certain parts of his novel, he did not substantially copy their work. However, in the published extracts of his judgement, Smith also criticized the non-appearance of Blythe Brown and the vagueness of Brown's evidence, saying, "He has presented himself as being a deep and thorough researcher...evidence in this case demonstrates that as regards DVC [The Da Vinci Code] that is simply not correct with respect to historical lectures...The reality of his research is that it is superficial."

Smith also included a code in his judgment, consisting of apparently random letters that were italicized, and which form a pair of messages. The letters in the first paragraphs spell smithy code and the rest appear as follows "jaeiextostgpsacgreamqwfkadpmqzv". This was subsequently decoded to read "Smithy Code Jackie Fisher who are you Dreadnought", a reference to the British admiral whom Judge Smith admires.

=== Jack Dunn ===
In 2007 author Jack Dunn filed a copyright infringement lawsuit in Massachusetts against Brown, Random House, and Sony Pictures, claiming that Brown plagiarized his 1997 novel The Vatican Boys when writing The Da Vinci Code. Dunn stated, "Dan Brown took huge elements from my book. Of course everybody can write about Opus Dei and have copyright protection, but in both 'The Vatican Boys' and 'The Da Vinci Code' the head of the Opus Dei hires a mercenary to find them a relic so that he can become the most powerful man in Christendom." Judge Michael Ponsor dismissed the case in 2007, ruling, "No prior case recognizing a theory of copyright infringement based on the sort of thematic or structural similarity posited by the plaintiff has been offered in his memorandum opposing summary judgment, nor has the court found one." In 2017 Marketwatch reported that Dunn was preparing to bring a lawsuit against Brown's publisher Penguin Random House in the United Kingdom.

== Christian response ==
At a conference on April 28, 2006, Archbishop Angelo Amato, the secretary of the Congregation for the Doctrine of the Faith, a Vatican curial department, specifically called for a boycott of the film version of The Da Vinci Code, characterizing the film as "full of calumnies, offenses, and historical and theological errors." The film was rated as "morally offensive" by the U.S. Conference of Catholic Bishops.

In India, home to 28 million Christians (2.3% of the population), the Central Board of Film Certification gave the film an adult rating on condition that disclaimers saying it was a work of fiction were inserted at the beginning and end of the film.

In contrast, some Catholic groups sought to use interest in this book and film as a means to educate Catholics and non-Catholics on the history of the Christian Church, and what it teaches regarding Jesus Christ. Similarly, other Christians have looked to use the film as a tool for evangelism.
