= Ken Whitehead =

Canadian soccer player

Personal information
- Full name: Kenneth Whitehead
- Date of birth: 11 April 1955 (age 71)
- Place of birth: Vancouver, British Columbia, Canada
- Height: 5 ft 9 in (1.75 m)
- Position: Forward

College career
Years	Team	Apps	(Gls)
1975–1976	Simon Fraser	37	(41)

Senior career*
Years	Team	Apps	(Gls)
1977	Los Angeles Aztecs	1	(0)

International career
1976	Canada Olympics	1	(0)
- * Club domestic league appearances and goals

Kenneth Whitehead (born 11 April 1955) is a Canadian former soccer player who competed at the 1976 Summer Olympics.

He played for Simon Fraser University in 1975 and 1976 and still holds the SFU single season record for most points in a season (61) and most goals in a season (28) in 1976. Despite playing only 37 games, he sits 7th in all-time scoring. SFU won the NAIA championship in Ken's final year.

He played professional soccer with the Los Angeles Aztecs in 1977.
