= Lighthouse Catholic Media =

Nonprofit Catholic media distributor

- Parent company: Augustine Institute
- Founded: 2005
- Founder: Mark Middendorf, Terry Barber and Dave Durand
- Status: Active
- Genre: Catholic media
- Country of origin: United States
- Location: Greenwood Village, Colorado
- Official website: www.lighthousecatholicmedia.com

Lighthouse Catholic Media is a nonprofit corporation that distributes CDs and digital downloads of Catholic-themed content. Lighthouse has provided CD programs to over 7,500 Roman Catholic parishes throughout the United States and Canada and has distributed over 10 million audio CDs on Catholic topics. Some Catholic radio stations in the U.S., such as WBVM, broadcast Lighthouse productions as part of their regular program schedule.

== History ==
Lighthouse Catholic Media was founded in 2005, by Mark Middendorf, Terry Barber and Dave Durand. Middendorf was inspired to start Lighthouse Catholic Media after listening to cassette tapes by Scott Hahn and other Catholic speakers. Using his business knowledge garnered from a successful career in corporate sales, Middendorf began distributing tapes to family and friends. He then met Terry Barber, founder of St. Joseph Communications (one of Middendorf's early tape suppliers), and Dave Durand and started Lighthouse Catholic Media as a full-time pursuit. Middendorf notes, "The Lord puts the people He wants us to meet along our path - we simply need to be open ourselves to recognize these beacons of light along the road and orient ourselves to His inspirations."

Lighthouse makes available audio CDs and MP3s at a relatively low cost in order to ensure that they are affordable for as many people as possible. In the last few years, Lighthouse has developed a comprehensive Parish Kiosk program. The Parish Kiosk program distributes CD display cases to Catholic parishes throughout the United States and Canada. The kiosks are stocked with a variety of Lighthouse CDs available for free, although donations are requested.

Lighthouse Catholic Media has recently announced plans to distribute audio CDs in India where more than 17 million Catholics reside. Additionally, they are planning to distribute in Australia and Ireland in the near future. In 2015, the organization purchased facilities in DeKalb, Illinois, for expanded distribution of its CDs and literature. Lighthouse CDs are also made available to radio stations for broadcast. WBVM, a Catholic radio station in Tampa, Florida, includes Lighthouse productions as part of its regular program schedule, for example.

In 2015, the Lighthouse Catholic Mediamerged with the Augustine Institute in “a new strategic alliance.”

In the beginning of 2022, Mark Middendorf was named as the 4th President of Ave Maria University but maintains his position with Lighthouse as well.

== Military download program ==
Lighthouse Catholic Media also distributes their audio downloads through a partnership with the Archdiocese of the United States Military headed by Archbishop Timothy Broglio.
