= C. John McCloskey =

American Catholic priest

The Reverend C. John McCloskey
- Church: Catholic Church
- Diocese: Archdiocese of Washington

Orders
- Ordination: 1981 by Roger Etchegaray

Personal details
- Born: Charles John McCloskey III; October 12, 1953 Washington D.C.
- Died: February 23, 2023 (aged 69) Fairfax, Virginia

Charles John McCloskey III (October 12, 1953 – February 23, 2023) was a Catholic member of the Priestly Society of the Holy Cross. He was a well-known author and spiritual director and a former director of the Catholic Information Center (CIC) in Washington, D.C..

He worked on Wall Street at Citibank and Merrill Lynch for a number of years before becoming a priest. He was ordained in 1981 by Cardinal Roger Etchegaray. McCloskey sexually abused a woman while director of the Catholic Information Center; a settlement was reached with her in 2005.

== Biography ==
McCloskey was born in 1953. He grew up in Bethesda, Maryland. He attended St. Jane de Chantal Elementary School, class of 1967, St. John's College High School, class of 1971. He graduated in economics from Columbia University, class of 1975, and with his doctorate in theology (S.T.D.) from University of Navarra (Spain) in 1982.

He was ordained a priest for the Prelature of the Holy Cross and Opus Dei at the Shrine of Torreciudad (Spain) in 1981.

On February 23, 2023, McCloskey died from complications related to advanced Alzheimer's disease. A funeral Mass was held on March 1, 2023, at Catherine of Siena Catholic Church in Great Falls, Virginia. He is interred at Gate of Heaven Cemetery in Silver Spring, Maryland.

== Writing, television appearances, and pastoral activities ==
McCloskey was known for his pastoral writings, which appeared in "The Catholic Thing," and on Catholicity.com, etc. He also wrote a book, The Essential Belloc - A Prophet for Our Times.

He appeared on Eternal Word Television Network (EWTN), where he hosted series on Cardinal Newman, Catholic authors, Ecclesial Movements, Great Moments in Church History", "Your Vocation: God's Call in Your Life", and "St. Thomas More Faithful Statesman."

In addition to having been the director of the Catholic Information Center (CIC) in Washington, D.C., McCloskey engaged in ministry in Princeton, New Jersey and Chicago, Illinois. He helped many people convert to Catholicism, including well-known individuals, such as Newt Gingrich, Sam Brownback, Lawrence Kudlow, Robert Novak, and Bernard Nathanson.

== Sexual misconduct scandal ==
In November 2002, the Prelature of Opus Dei received a complaint from an adult woman accusing McCloskey of sexual misconduct while he was serving as the director of the Catholic Information Center in Washington, DC. Following an investigation, Opus Dei found the accusation to be credible, and McCloskey was removed as director of the Catholic Information Center. Restrictions were placed on his pastoral assignments (particularly involving women), and Opus Dei settled with the woman for $977,000 in 2005.

== Education ==
- BA (1975) in economics, Columbia University
- Sacred Theology, Pontifical University of the Holy Cross
- Doctorate in Sacred Theology (STD), University of Navarra

== Books ==
- (2010) The Essential Belloc - A Prophet for Our Times, ISBN 978-1-935302-36-0
