= Mike Schmitz =

American Catholic priest (born 1974)

The Reverend Father Mike Schmitz
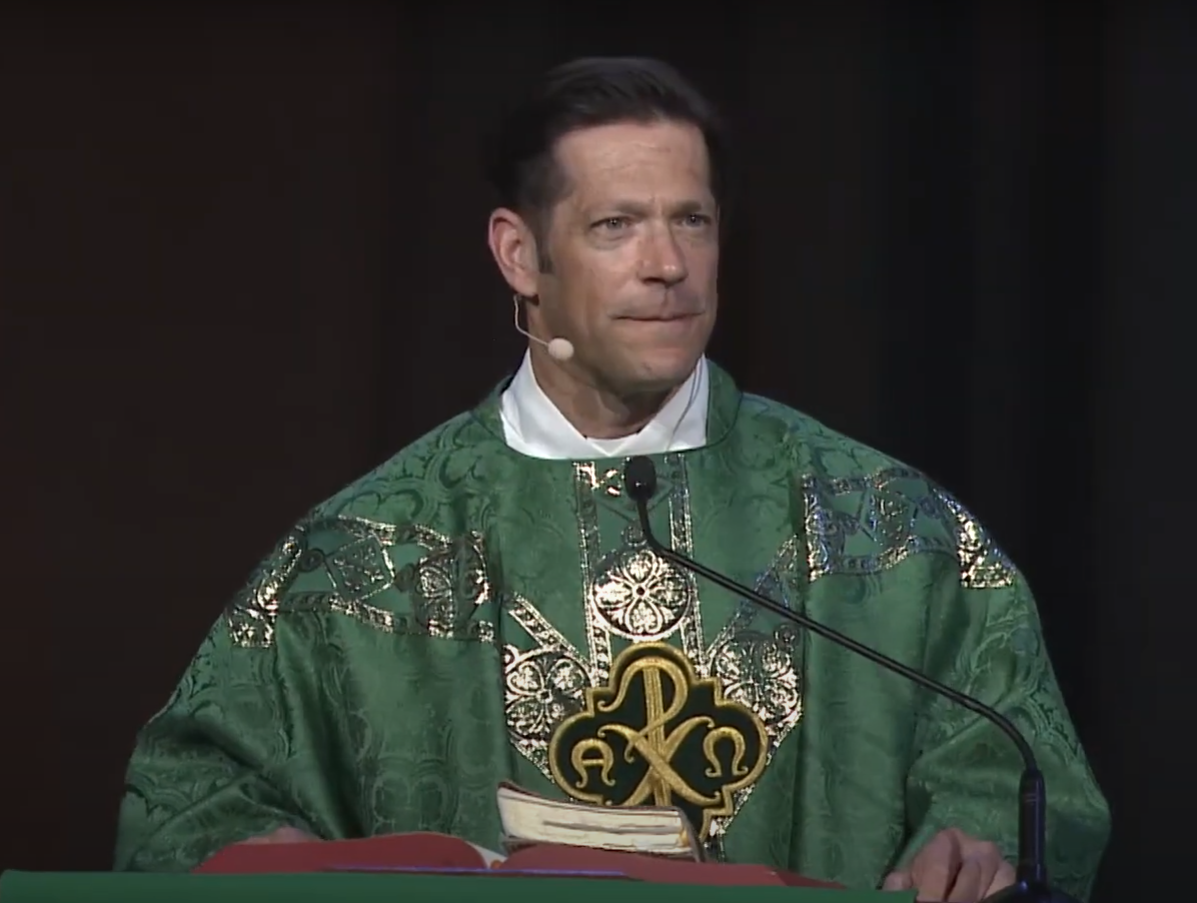
- Schmitz in 2022
- Church: Catholic Church
- Diocese: Duluth

Orders
- Ordination: June 6, 2003 by Dennis Marion Schnurr

Personal details
- Born: Michael Thomas Schmitz; December 14, 1974 (age 51) Oak Park, Illinois, U.S.
- Denomination: Catholicism
- Education: College of Saint Benedict and Saint John's University; Saint Paul Seminary

Ordination history of Mike Schmitz
History
Priestly ordination
- Ordained by: Dennis Marion Schnurr (Duluth)

Michael Thomas Schmitz (born December 14, 1974) is an American Catholic priest, speaker, author, and podcaster. He serves as director of youth and young adult ministry in the Diocese of Duluth and Newman Center chaplain at the University of Minnesota Duluth. Schmitz is most notable for his social media presence, including YouTube videos and The Bible in a Year podcast produced by Ascension Press.

== Early life and education ==
Michael Thomas Schmitz was born in Oak Park, a suburb of Chicago, where his father attended medical school. He is the fourth of six children, born to Peter Schmitz, an orthopedic surgeon, and Gudrun "Goodie" Schmitz (née Amundsen). Schmitz is of Irish and Norwegian descent; his paternal grandmother comes from County Cork. The family then relocated to Brainerd, Minnesota, where his father practiced medicine. Schmitz was baptized on March 1, 1975 at the Church of the Assumption, Richfield, Minnesota (south of Minneapolis). He attended St. Francis of the Lakes Catholic School for elementary school, Brainerd High School, and St. John's University, where he majored in Theology.

Despite being brought up in a Catholic family, Schmitz was largely indifferent to religion until the age of 15. After spending time as a missionary in Central America, Schmitz attended Saint Paul Seminary School of Divinity and was ordained in 2003 for the Diocese of Duluth. Schmitz is currently the director of youth and young adult ministry for the diocese as well as the Newman Center chaplain at the University of Minnesota Duluth.

== Media career ==
Since 2015, Schmitz has been the host of Ascension Presents, a YouTube series produced by Ascension Press offering Catholic perspectives on cultural and societal issues. Beginning in 2017, these talks have also been offered as podcasts.

Ascension Presents

YouTube information
- Channel: Ascension Presents
- Years active: 2014-present
- Subscribers: 1.1 million
- Views: 166 million
- Last updated: March 6, 2025

On January 1, 2021, Schmitz and Ascension launched a new podcast, The Bible in a Year, which consists of 365 daily episodes reading the entire Bible (including the Deuterocanonical books). In each episode, he reads and discusses sections of the Bible, also adding his own commentary and prayer. The podcast achieved massive success.

Schmitz was the keynote speaker at the 2022 March for Life rally, an annual pro-life event in Washington, DC.

On June 29, 2022, Schmitz and Ascension announced they would be launching another podcast, The Catechism in a Year, which premiered on January 1, 2023. The format is similar to The Bible in a Year, consisting of 365 daily episodes where Schmitz reads and discusses sections of the Catechism, adding in his own prayer and commentary.

The Bible in 10 Minutes, a YouTube video uploaded on July 9, 2024 by The Bible in a Year and produced by Ascension and Coronation Media, features Schmitz retelling the stories of Adam and Eve, Moses, David, and Jesus, condensing the narrative into under 10 minutes. As of September 2026, the video had garnered over two million views since its release.

== Books ==
- Made for Love: Same-Sex Attraction and the Catholic Church (2018)
- How to Make Great Decisions (2019)
- A World Undone (November 20, 2020)
- Pocket Guide to the Sacrament of Reconciliation (2021)
- Bible in a Year Companion, Volumes 1-3 (2021)
- Catechism in a Year Companion, Volumes 1-3 (2023)
- Unshakeable: Building a Life of Virtue in a World of Chaos (2025)

== See also ==
- Bishop Robert Barron
- Catholic Church in the United States
