= Patrick Madrid =

American author and radio host (born 1960)

Patrick Thaddeus Madrid
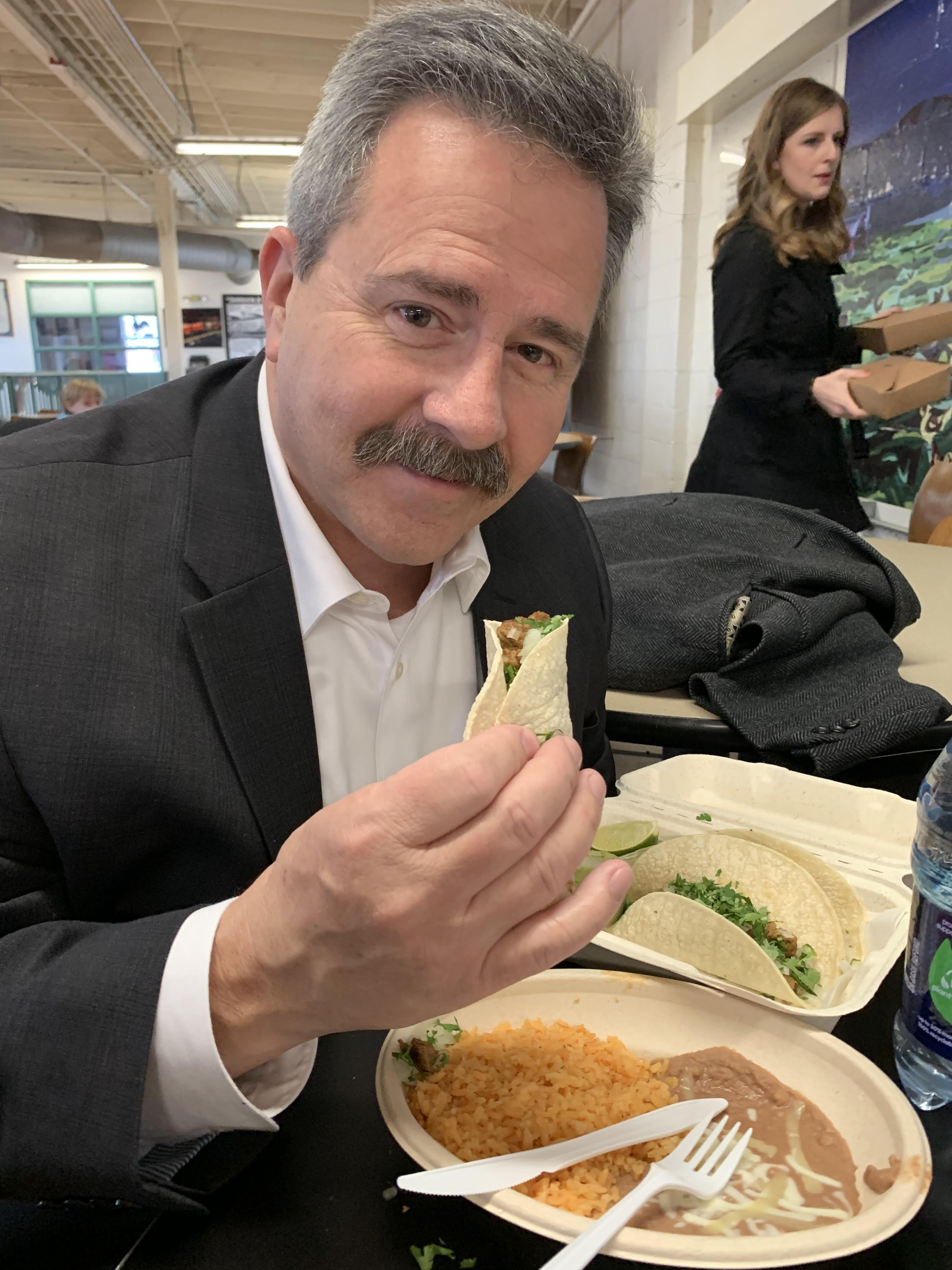
- Madrid in 2019
- Born: November 8, 1960 (age 65); Los Angeles, California, U.S.
- Education: University of Phoenix (BS); Pontifical College Josephinum (BPhil), (MA)
- Occupations: Author; radio host; public speaker; apologist
- Years active: 1987–present
- Organizations: Relevant Radio; Holy Apostles College and Seminary; Saint Patrick's Seminary and University; Catholic Answers
- Spouse: Nancy Madrid (m. 1981)
- Children: 11
- Website: patrickmadrid.com

Patrick Madrid (born November 8, 1960) is an American Catholic, author, and radio host. His many books include Why Be Catholic? (Penguin Random House), Life Lessons: 50 Things I Learned in My First 50 Years (Ignatius Press), and How to Do Apologetics (Our Sunday Visitor). His books have sold over one million copies, including foreign-language editions.

He hosts the “Patrick Madrid Show” radio program on Relevant Radio, three hours daily.

Aside from his radio presence, Madrid is best known for his work in Catholic apologetics. He worked for eight years (1988 to 1996) at Catholic Answers, serving as vice president. He has published numerous articles on Scripture, Church history, patristics, apologetics, and evangelization in various Catholic and Protestant periodicals and has contributed scholarly articles on apologetics in the New Catholic Encyclopedia.

== Early life and education ==
Patrick Madrid was born on November 8, 1960, in Lynwood, California, a near suburb of Los Angeles. His father, Bernard Madrid served for four years in the U.S. Coast Guard as a sailor, after which he had a long career as an electronics engineer. His mother, Gretchen, was a housewife. Madrid is the oldest of their eight children, one of whom died shortly after birth of pulmonary complications. Growing up in Southern California, Madrid was baptized at Saint Mary of the Assumption Catholic Church in Whittier and was raised primarily in Orange County, attending the Mission San Juan Capistrano Grammar School for several years.

Madrid earned a Bachelor of Science degree in business management from the University of Phoenix as well as a B.Phil. in philosophy and an M.A. in dogmatic theology (cum laude) from the Pontifical College Josephinum in Columbus, Ohio. He did graduate studies in theology at the University of Dallas. He has taught undergraduate courses on apologetics and the sacraments as an adjunct professor on the theology faculty at Franciscan University of Steubenville.

== Career ==
Patrick Madrid has been a Catholic apologist since 1987. He hosts The Patrick Madrid Show on Relevant Radio weekdays 9-noon ET, discussing current events, modern culture, apologetics, and a variety of "God topics." Madrid does not have guests or conduct interviews on his show, but instead, engages listeners with personal commentary and interacts extensively with callers. He has conducted thousands of apologetics seminars in English and Spanish at parishes, conferences, and universities across the United States, as well as throughout Europe, Canada, in Latin America, Asia, Australia, New Zealand, and Israel. Since 1990, he has been a regular presenter at the Franciscan University of Steubenville's "Defending the Faith" summer apologetics conferences and has been a guest lecturer in theology at Christendom College in their "Major Speakers" program. Madrid has engaged in at least a dozen formal public debates with Protestant, Mormon, and other non-Catholic spokesmen.

He founded what is now known as the Envoy institute in 1996 with the launch of Envoy Magazine, which reached a peak circulation of approximately 12,000 paid subscribers. The magazine was discontinued in 2011 when it lost its institutional funding source.

He currently serves as an adjunct professor of apologetics at Holy Apostles College and Seminary and at Saint Patrick's Seminary and University in Menlo Park, California.

== Views on social issues ==
On The Patrick Madrid Show, Madrid has discussed gender identity, homosexuality, and Islam, framing these topics in terms of Catholic teaching.

=== Gender identity and homosexuality ===
In a 2022 broadcast responding to listener questions about gender identity, Madrid recommended Abigail Shrier's Irreversible Damage and Ryan T. Anderson's When Harry Became Sally. In a 2024 call, a listener accused him of promoting transphobic views; Madrid responded by saying that if gender could be self-identified, he could identify as a Harvard graduate. In 2024, he took the pro–same-sex marriage side in a staged debate with Fr. Mike Schmitz at Franciscan University of Steubenville, while stating that it did not reflect his own view.

=== Islam and immigration ===
In a 2009 blog post, Madrid wrote that Spaniards he spoke with during a visit expressed uniformly negative views of Muslims, based on fears that Islam was overtaking Spain through immigration and birth rates; he described this as "depressing" and paired it with an article, credited to Robert Spencer's Jihad Watch, asserting that a proposed European Union anti-discrimination directive would criminalize objections to Islamic practices and homosexuality. A 2025 episode of his show addressed multiculturalism, immigration's effect on Western identity, and Muslims praying in European churches.

=== Other ===
In 2023, a social media post in which Madrid objected to an "evil eye" amulet included with an online purchase drew complaints that he had insulted a cultural tradition; Madrid replied that the symbol appears across many cultures and is incompatible with Christian practice.

== Personal life ==
He and his wife, Nancy, have 11 children and 29 grandchildren.

A life-long avid fan of the Beatles, after playing trumpet in grammar school since the fourth grade, Madrid switched to the bass guitar at the age of 14, playing in various area garage bands, and eventually played bass for several years in Geneva Brown, an obscure Southern California rock band. He sometimes refers humorously on his radio show to his garage-band days by commenting on a particular word or phrase drawn news sources that he says would make for a "good garage band name."

== Books ==
- Surprised by Truth (Saint Benedict Press), 1994 ISBN 0964261081
- Any Friend of God’s Is a Friend of Mine (Saint Benedict Press), 1996 ISBN 096426109X
- Pope Fiction: Answers to 30 Myths and Misconceptions about the Papacy (Saint Benedict Press), 1999 ISBN 0964261006
- Surprised by Truth 2 (Sophia Institute Press), 2000 ISBN 1928832180
- Search and Rescue (Sophia Institute Press), 2001 ISBN 9781928832270
- Where Is That in the Bible? (Our Sunday Visitor), 2001 ISBN 0879736933
- Surprised by Truth 3 (Sophia Institute Press), 2002 ISBN 1928832598
- Why Is That in Tradition? (Our Sunday Visitor), 2002 ISBN 1931709068
- Answer Me This (Our Sunday Visitor) 2003 ISBN 1931709580
- More Catholic than the Pope (Our Sunday Visitor), 2004 ISBN 1931709262
- Does the Bible Really Say That? (Servant Books), 2006 ISBN 0867167742
- A Pocket Guide to Apologetics (Our Sunday Visitor), 2006 ISBN 1592762085
- A Pocket Guide to Purgatory (Our Sunday Visitor), 2007 ISBN 1592762948
- 150 Bible Verses Every Catholic Should Know (Servant Books), 2008 ISBN 0867169028]
- The Godless Delusion: A Catholic Challenge to Modern Atheism (Our Sunday Visitor), 2010 ISBN 1592767877
- Envoy for Christ: 25 Years as a Catholic Apologist (Servant Books), 2012 ISBN 161636484X
- A Year With the Bible: Scriptural Wisdom for Daily Living (St. Benedict Press), 2012 ISBN 1618904167
- Why Be Catholic? 10 Answers to a Very Important Question (Penguin Random House, 2013) ISBN 0307986438
- On a Mission: Lessons from Saint Francis de Sales (Servant Books), 2013 ISBN 161636436X
- Scripture and Tradition in the Church (Sophia Institute Press), 2014 ISBN 1622822137
- Now What? A Guide for New (and Not So New) Catholics (Servant Books), 2015 ISBN 1616367210
- How to Do Apologetics (Our Sunday Visitor), 2015 ISBN 1612785832
- Life Lessons: 50 Things I Learned in My First 50 Years (Ignatius Press), 2016 ISBN 1621641147
- Surprised by Life (Sophia Institute Press), 2017 ISBN 1622823737
- InQUIZition: Rack Your Brain & Stretch Your Knowledge (Sophia Institute Press, 2022)
- FORTHCOMING BOOKS:
- What Am I Doing Here?
