= Scott Hahn =

American Catholic theologian and apologist (born 1957)

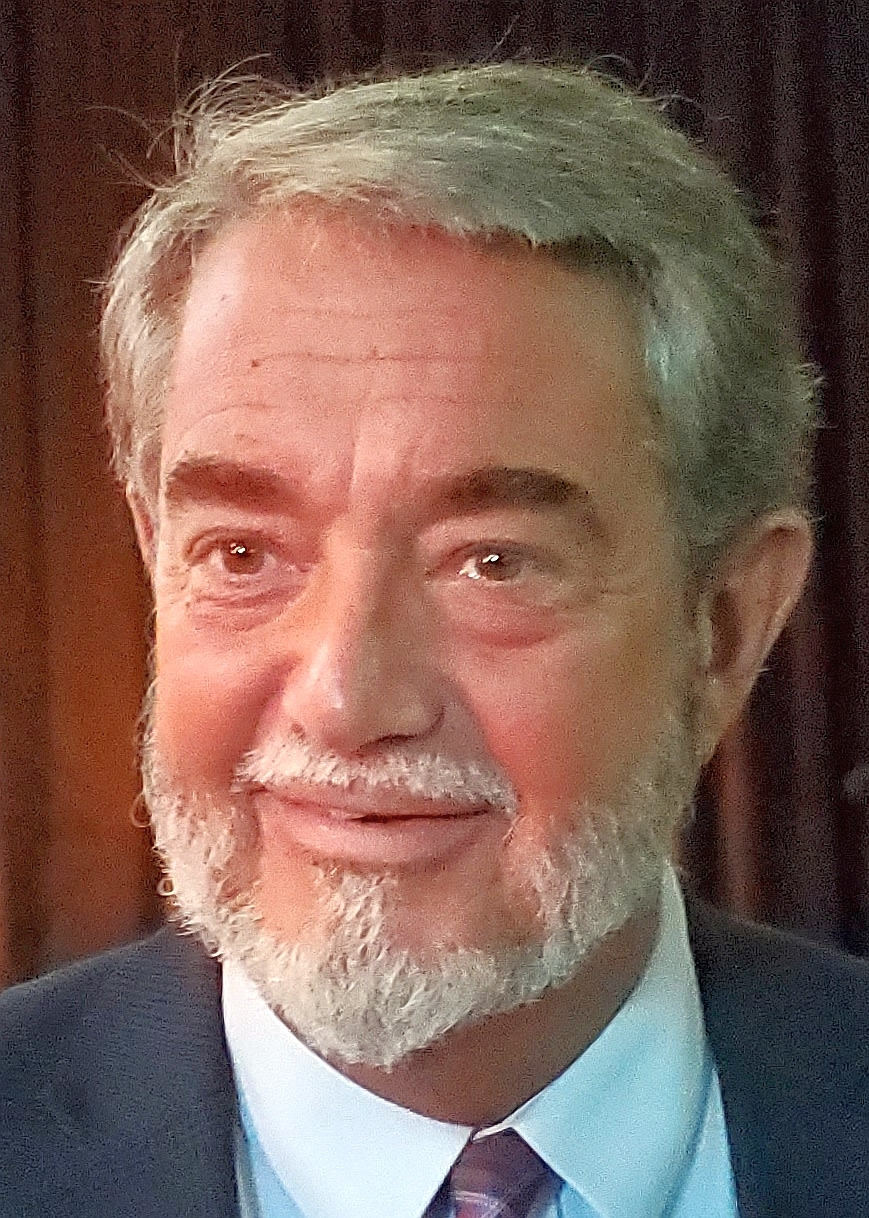
- Hahn in 2019
- Born: October 28, 1957 (age 69); Bethel Park, Pennsylvania, U.S.
- Occupations: Professor; Author; Speaker; Christian apologist
- Title: Father Michael Scanlan Chair of Biblical Theology and the New Evangelization
- Spouse: Kimberly Hahn (m. 1979)
- Children: 6

Academic background
- Education: Grove City College (BA); Gordon-Conwell Seminary (MDiv); Marquette University (PhD)
- Thesis: Kinship by Covenant: A Biblical Theological Analysis of Covenant Types and Texts in the Old and New Testaments

Academic work
- Institutions: Franciscan University of Steubenville

Scott Walker Hahn (born October 28, 1957) is an American Catholic author, theologian and apologist.

Hahn is the author of over 50 books regarding Catholic theology, Church history and Bible studies. Hahn currently teaches at the Franciscan University of Steubenville in Ohio. He has also lectured at the Pontifical College Josephinum in Columbus, Ohio.

Hahn was a Presbyterian minister before converting to Catholicism. His popular works include Rome Sweet Home and The Lamb's Supper: The Mass as Heaven on Earth. His lectures have been featured in multiple audio distributions through Lighthouse Catholic Media. Hahn is known for his research on Early Christianity during the Apostolic Age and various theoretical works concerning the early Church Fathers.

== Biography ==
=== Education ===
Hahn received his B.A. degree magna cum laude in 1979 from Grove City College in Pennsylvania with a triple major of theology, philosophy and economics. He obtained his M.Div. degree summa cum laude from Gordon–Conwell Theological Seminary in 1982. In May 1995, he was awarded a Ph.D. degree in systematic theology from Marquette University (Phi Beta Kappa).

Hahn's dissertation is titled "Kinship by Covenant: A Biblical Theological Analysis of Covenant Types and Texts in the Old and New Testaments". A version was published by Yale University Press in 2009 as Kinship by Covenant: A Canonical Approach to the Fulfillment of God's Saving Promises. Harvard professor Jon D. Levenson described it as "a learned and well-written volume interprets covenant as the red thread running through both testaments of the Christian Bible."

=== Conversion to Catholicism ===
After receiving his education at Gordon–Conwell Theological Seminary, Hahn started out as a pastor at Trinity Presbyterian Church in Fairfax, Virginia. Since that time, he has held a variety of positions at institutes, seminaries, and universities.

As a young man, Hahn was convinced that the Catholic Church was in error and boasted of having converted some Catholics into embracing a purer Christianity. His conversion began when he and his wife became convinced that contraception was contrary to God's law. He was bothered that the Catholic Church was the only tradition that upheld the ancient teaching of prohibiting contraception that Protestants abandoned in the early 20th century, such as at the 1930 Lambeth Conference. Hahn continued to study various issues relating to salvation, faith, and good works, as well as the Protestant doctrine of sola scriptura.

According to his book Rome Sweet Home, a key factor behind his conversion is his research on what he saw as the key to the Bible: the covenant. This is a sacred kinship bond that brought people into a family relationship. God established a series of covenants and the new covenant established by Jesus Christ is an establishment of a worldwide family. He believes that Jesus and the apostles used family-based language to describe his work of salvation: God is Father, Christ is Son and the firstborn among brethren, heaven as a marriage feast, the Church is the spouse of God, Christians as children of God.

This new family, according to Hahn, is headed by Christ and the Pope is his "prime minister" to whom he has given the keys of the kingdom, a process that he believes is also present in the Old Testament. Hahn writes that the Catholic Church, whose head is called "Holy Father", is the worldwide family described by the Bible and that the Protestant doctrines of sola fide and sola scriptura are not biblical because they are not found in the Bible. In his view, the Bible stresses charity and works as necessary for saving faith, i.e., justification, and, therefore, salvation. He also points to the Church as "the pillar and bulwark of the truth", quoting 1 Timothy 3:15.

Hahn converted to Catholicism at Easter 1986 in Milwaukee, Wisconsin. He came to be called "Luther in reverse", from his wife's words.

Hahn's wife, Kimberly, had a similar conversion at a slightly later date, entering the Catholic Church at Easter 1990 in Joliet, Illinois. Rome Sweet Home describes their process of conversion together.

In Ordinary Work, Extraordinary Grace, he narrated the influence of Opus Dei in his conversion and what made him feel that Opus Dei was his specific calling within the Catholic Church: (1) its members' devotion to the Bible; (2) its ecumenism, since Opus Dei was the first Catholic institution to welcome non-Catholics as cooperators; (3) the upright lives of its members; (4) they were ordinary people, who lived theology; (5) holy ambition: "a devout work ethic"; (6) the practice of hospitality in answering his questions; (7) prayer: "They made time for intimate prayer every day."

=== Current work ===
Hahn founded and is currently the president of the St. Paul Center for Biblical Theology, a Catholic non-profit research and educational institute committed to the promotion of biblical literacy among the Catholic laity and biblical fluency among Catholic clergy.

Some of his projects include online and parish-based Bible studies, a book series, pilgrimages, and a scholarly journal, Letter and Spirit. He is also the founder and director of the Institute of Applied Biblical Studies.

A popular speaker, Hahn has given over 800 talks in the US and other countries on theological and biblical topics related to the Catholic faith and appears regularly on the Eternal Word Television Network (EWTN). His talks have also been featured in multiple audio titles distributed by Lighthouse Catholic Media. He has also written numerous books (see list below) and is the co-editor of the Ignatius Catholic Study Bible.

Since 1990, Hahn has taught at the Franciscan University of Steubenville, where he is the Father Michael Scanlan, TOR, Chair of Biblical Theology and the New Evangelization. He was awarded Doctor of Humanities – honoris causa, by the Pontifical Catholic University of Puerto Rico in 2004. In 2014, Francis Cardinal George appointed Hahn to the newly established McEssy Distinguished Visiting Professorship in Biblical Theology at Mundelein Seminary in Chicago.

== Personal life ==
Hahn is married to Kimberly Hahn, who co-runs their Catholic apostolate, the St. Paul Center for Biblical Theology. They have six children together and 26 grandchildren.

== Books ==
- Rome Sweet Home: Our Journey to Catholicism (co-written with Kimberly Hahn), Ignatius Press, 1993. ISBN 0-89870-478-2
- Catholic for a Reason (with Leon Suprenant, editor), Emmaus Road Publishing, 1998. ISBN 0-9663223-0-4
- A Father Who Keeps His Promises, Servant Publications, 1998. ISBN 0-89283-829-9
- The Lamb's Supper: The Mass as Heaven on Earth, Doubleday, 1999. ISBN 0-385-49659-1
- Hail, Holy Queen: The Mother of God in the Word of God, Doubleday, 2001. ISBN 0-385-50168-4
- First Comes Love: Finding Your Family in the Church and the Trinity, Doubleday, 2002. ISBN 0-385-49662-1
- Lord Have Mercy: The Healing Power of Confession, Doubleday, 2003. ISBN 0-385-50170-6
- Swear to God: The Promise and Power of the Sacraments, Doubleday, 2004. ISBN 0-385-50931-6
- Letter and Spirit: From Written Text to Living Word in the Liturgy, Doubleday, 2005. ISBN 0-385-50933-2
- Ordinary Work, Extraordinary Grace, Doubleday, 2006. ISBN 978-0-385-51924-3
- Reasons to Believe: How to Understand, Explain, and Defend the Catholic Faith, Doubleday, 2007. ISBN 978-0-385-50935-0
- Answering the New Atheism: Dismantling Dawkins' Case Against God, (with Benjamin Wiker), Emmaus Road Publishing, 2008. ISBN 978-1-931018-48-7
- Kinship by Covenant: A Canonical Approach to the Fulfillment of God's Saving Promises, Yale University Press, 2009. ISBN 978-0-300-14097-2
- Signs of Life: 40 Catholic Customs and Their Biblical Roots, Image, 2009. ISBN 978-0-385519496
- Catholic Bible Dictionary, Image, 2009. ISBN 978-0385512299
- Covenant and Communion: The Biblical Theology of Pope Benedict XVI, Baker Brazos Press, 2009. ISBN 978-1-58743-269-9
- Hope for Hard Times, Our Sunday Visitor, 2009. ISBN 978-1592767106
- Faith and Revelation: Core Subject I: The Revelation of Jesus Christ in Scripture, Midwest Theological Forum, 2009. ISBN 978-1-948139-87-8
- Many Are Called: Rediscovering the Glory of the Priesthood, Image, 2010. ISBN 978-0-307590770
- Politicizing the Bible: The Roots of Historical Criticism and the Secularization of Scripture 1300-1700 (co-written with Benjamin Wiker), The Crossroad Publishing Company, 2013. ISBN 978-0824599034.
- Consuming the Word: The New Testament and The Eucharist in the Early Church, Image, 2013. ISBN 978-0307590817
- The Church: Core subject IV: Jesus Christ’s Mission Continues in the Church, Midwest Theological Forum, 2013. ISBN 978-1-962548-01-4
- Evangelizing Catholics: A Mission Manual for the New Evangelization, Our Sunday Visitor, 2014. ISBN 978-1612787732
- Angels and Saints: A Biblical Friendship with God's Holy Ones, Image, 2014. ISBN 978-0307590794
- Joy to the World: How Christ's Coming Changed Everything and Still Does, Image, 2014. ISBN 978-0804141123
- God's Covenant with You: The Bible Tells a Story, 2015. ISBN 978-0955538049
- The Creed: Professing the Faith Through the Ages, Emmaus Road Publishing, 2016. ISBN 978-1941447772
- Romans (Catholic Commentary on Sacred Scripture), Baker Academic, 2017. ISBN 978-1-4934-1136-8
- The First Society: The Sacrament of Matrimony and the Restoration of the Social Order, Emmaus Road Publishing, 2018. ISBN 978-1947792548
- The Fourth Cup: Unveiling the Mystery of the Last Supper and the Cross, Image, 2018. ISBN 978-1524758790
- Hope to Die: The Christian Meaning of Death and the Resurrection of the Body, (with Emily Stimpson Chapman), Emmaus Road Publishing, 2020. ISBN 978-1645850304
- It is Right and Just: Why the Future of Civilization Depends on True Religion, (with Brandon McGinley, Emmaus Road Publishing, 2020. ISBN 978-1645850724
- Holy Is His Name: The Transforming Power of God’s Holiness in Scripture, Emmaus Road Publishing, 2022. ISBN 978-1645852551
- Understanding the Scriptures: Elective A: Sacred Scripture, Midwest Theological Forum, 2025. ISBN 978-1-962548-18-2

Books in Spanish:

- La evangelización de los católicos. Manual para la misión de La Nueva Evangelización, Palabra, 2015. ISBN 978-84-9061-179-1
- Fe y revelación: Conocer a Dios a través de la Sagrada Escritura, Midwest Theological Forum, 2015. ISBN 978-84-220-1808-7
- Comprender las Escrituras, Midwest Theological Forum, 2016. ISBN 978-1-939231-45-1
- Esperanza para momentos difíciles, Palabra, 2016. ISBN 978-84-9061-356-6
- La Iglesia: Sacramento de Salvación, Midwest Theological Forum, 2017. ISBN 978-1-939231-48-2
