= Iced tea (disambiguation) =

Iced tea is a cold tea drink.

Iced tea may also refer to:

- IcedTea, a Java-related build and integration project

== See also ==
- Icet (disambiguation)
  - International Consultation on English Texts (ICET)
  - Ice-T (born 1958), rapper
    - Ice-T VI: Return of the Real, a 1996 album by Ice-T
  - ICE T, a German high speed train
  - Aechmea 'Ice-T', a cultivar (plant type)
- ISTEA, Intermodal Surface Transportation Efficiency Act
- Long Island Iced Tea, a type of alcoholic mixed drink typically made with tequila, vodka, light rum, triple sec, gin, and a splash of cola, which gives the drink the same amber hue as its namesake
