= English versions of the Nicene Creed =

Nicene Creed; English versions with Modern English commentary

The Nicene Creed, composed in part and adopted at the First Council of Nicaea (325) and revised with additions by the First Council of Constantinople (381), is a creed that summarizes the orthodox faith of the Christian Church and is used in the liturgy of most Christian confessions. It has been translated into the Modern English language by various groups within the last 100 years.

== Versions in current liturgical use ==
=== Catholic Church ===
==== Latin Rite of the Catholic Church ====
The Latin and English translations for use in the Mass of the Roman Rite is found in the Order of Mass. It begins with "Credo" – "I believe" – and is a personal (not congregational) affirmation of faith. Including the Nicene Creed, the English translation of the Holy Sacrifice of the Mass was revised in 2011 by the International Commission on English in the Liturgy. The Nicene Creed as found on the United States Conference of Catholic Bishops website is as follows:

I believe in one God,
the Father almighty,
maker of heaven and earth,
of all things visible and invisible.

I believe in one Lord Jesus Christ,
the Only Begotten Son of God,
born of the Father before all ages.
God from God, Light from Light,
true God from true God,
begotten, not made, consubstantial with the Father;
through him all things were made.
For us men and for our salvation
he came down from heaven,
and by the Holy Spirit was incarnate of the Virgin Mary,
and became man.
For our sake he was crucified under Pontius Pilate,
he suffered death and was buried,
and rose again on the third day
in accordance with the Scriptures.
He ascended into heaven
and is seated at the right hand of the Father.
He will come again in glory
to judge the living and the dead
and his kingdom will have no end.

I believe in the Holy Spirit, the Lord, the giver of life,
who proceeds from the Father and the Son,
who with the Father and the Son is adored and glorified,
who has spoken through the prophets.

I believe in one, holy, catholic and apostolic Church.
I confess one Baptism for the forgiveness of sins
and I look forward to the resurrection of the dead
and the life of the world to come. Amen.

Within the Latin Church, the Ordinariate Form of the Roman Rite uses the following translation, taken from the Book of Common Prayer:

I believe in one God,
the Father Almighty,
maker of heaven and earth,
and of all things visible and invisible;

And in one Lord Jesus Christ,
the Only Begotten Son of God,
begotten of his Father before all worlds,
God of God, Light of Light,
very God of very God,
begotten, not made,
being of one substance with the Father;
by whom all things were made;
who for us men and for our salvation
came down from heaven,
and was incarnate by the Holy Ghost of the Virgin Mary,
and was made man;
and was crucified also for us under Pontius Pilate;
he suffered and was buried;
and the third day he rose again according to the Scriptures,
and ascended into heaven,
and sitteth on the right hand of the Father;
and he shall come again, with glory,
to judge both the quick and the dead;
whose kingdom shall have no end.

And I believe in the Holy Ghost the Lord, the Giver of Life,
who proceedeth from the Father and the Son;
who with the Father and the Son together is worshipped
and glorified;
who spake by the Prophets.
And I believe one holy Catholic and Apostolic Church;
I acknowledge one Baptism for the remission of sins;
and I look for the resurrection of the dead,
and the life of the world to come. Amen.

An explanation of the Creed can be found in the Catechism of the Catholic Church.

=== Ecumenical versions ===
==== 1975 ecumenical version (ICET) ====
The International Consultation on English Texts published an English translation of the Nicene Creed, first in 1970 and then in successive revisions in 1971 and 1975. These texts were adopted by several churches. The Roman Catholic Church in the United States, which adopted the 1971 version in 1973, and the Catholic Church in other English-speaking countries, which in 1975 adopted the version published in that year, continued to use them until 2011. The 1975 version was included in the 1978 Lutheran Book of Worship, the 1979 Episcopal Church (United States) Book of Common Prayer, though in both cases with one variation: in the line "For us men and for our salvation", they omitted the word "men." The ICET text and the versions adapted by various denominations use the plural "we" form which corresponds to the original text from the First Council of Nicaea and the First Council of Constantinople which begin the creed with "Πιστεύομεν" (pisteuomen, "we believe").

This is the ICET version currently used in The Episcopal Church (as of 1979).

We believe in one God,
the Father, the Almighty,
maker of heaven and earth,
of all that is seen and unseen.

We believe in one Lord, Jesus Christ,
the only Son of God,
eternally begotten of the Father,
God from God, Light from Light,
true God from true God,
begotten, not made,
of one Being with the Father.
Through him all things were made.
For us and for our salvation
he came down from heaven:
by the power of the Holy Spirit
he became incarnate from the Virgin Mary,
and was made man.
For our sake he was crucified under Pontius Pilate;
he suffered death and was buried.
On the third day he rose again
in accordance with the Scriptures;
he ascended into heaven
and is seated at the right hand of the Father.
He will come again in glory to judge the living and the dead,
and his kingdom will have no end.

We believe in the Holy Spirit, the Lord, the giver of life,
who proceeds from the Father and the Son.
With the Father and the Son he is worshiped and glorified.
He has spoken through the Prophets.
We believe in one holy catholic and apostolic Church.
We acknowledge one baptism for the forgiveness of sins.
We look for the resurrection of the dead,
and the life of the world to come. Amen.

— Episcopal Church Book of Common Prayer (1979), The Book of Common Prayer. New York: Church Hymnal Corporation. 1979. pp. 358–359.

==== 1988 ecumenical version (ELLC) ====
The English Language Liturgical Consultation (ELLC), the successor body to ICET, published in 1988 the book Praying Together, which included a revision of the 1975 ICET text. Variations of this text are gaining acceptance among mainline Protestant churches: it is used by the Methodist Church with little if any change, and by the Evangelical Lutheran Church in America. Other denominations use it with modifications that vary between the churches: see, for instance, the discussion within The ELLC Texts: A Survey of Use and Variation, which does not include recent use of the ELLC text by the ELCA in Evangelical Lutheran Worship (2006).

==== Ruthenian Catholic Church ====
The Ruthenian Catholic Church, a sui iuris Eastern Catholic Church, uses a text which was previously found on their website but has now been archived.

It is as follows:

I believe in one God, the Father Almighty, Creator of heaven and earth, of all things visible and invisible;

and in one Lord Jesus Christ, Son of God, the only-begotten, born of the Father before all ages. Light from light, true God from true God, begotten, not made, one in essence with the Father; through Him all things were made.

For us and for our salvation, he came down from heaven and was incarnate from the Holy Spirit and the Virgin Mary, and became man.

He was crucified for us under Pontius Pilate, and suffered and was buried. He rose on the third day according to the scriptures. He ascended into heaven and is seated at the right hand of the Father,

and he is coming again in glory to judge the living and the dead, and his kingdom will have no end.

And in the Holy Spirit, the Lord, the Creator of Life, who proceeds from the Father.

Together with the Father and the Son he is worshiped and glorified; he spoke through the prophets.

In one, holy, catholic and apostolic Church.

I profess one baptism for the remission of sins. I expect the resurrection of the dead and the life of the world to come. Amen.

==== Ukrainian Catholic Church ====
The Ukrainian Catholic Church, a sui iuris Eastern Catholic Church professes the Nicene Creed in the following way:

I believe in one God, the Father, the Almighty, maker of heaven and earth, of all that is seen and unseen.

I believe in one Lord, Jesus Christ, the only Son of God, eternally begotten of the Father. Light from Light, true God from true God, begotten, not made, one in being with the Father. Through Him all things were made.

For us men and for our salvation He came down from heaven: by the power of the Holy Spirit He was born of the Virgin Mary, and became man.

For our sake He was crucified under Pontius Pilate; He suffered, died, and was buried. On the third day He rose again in fulfillment of the Scriptures; He ascended into heaven and is seated at the right of the Father.

He will come again in glory to judge the living and the dead, and His kingdom will have no end.

I believe in the Holy Spirit, the Lord, the giver of life, who proceeds from the Father.

With the Father and the Son He is worshipped and glorified. He has spoken through the Prophets.

I believe in one, holy, catholic, and apostolic Church.

I acknowledge one baptism for the forgiveness of sins. I look for the resurrection of the dead, and the life of the world to come. Amen.

=== Oriental Orthodox Churches ===
==== Malankara Orthodox Syrian Church and Jacobite Syrian Christian Church ====
The Malankara Orthodox Syrian Church has an English translation of the Nicene Creed. It goes as follows:

We believe in One True God,
The Father Almighty, Maker of heaven and earth and of all things visible and invisible;
And in the One Lord Jesus Christ, the Only-Begotten Son of God, begotten of the Father before all world, Light of Light, True God of True God, begotten, not made, being of one essence with the Father, and by Whom all things were made; Who for us men and for our salvation came down from heaven;
†And was incarnate of the Holy Spirit and of the Holy Virgin Mary, Mother of God, and became man;
†And was crucified for us in the days of Pontius Pilate and suffered, and died, and was buried;
†And on the third day, He rose again according to His will, and ascended into heaven, and sits at the right hand of the Father, and shall come again in His great glory to judge both the living and the dead, whose kingdom shall have no end;
And in the one Living Holy Spirit, the life-giving Lord of all, Who proceeds from the Father, and Who with the Father and the Son is worshipped and glorified, Who spoke through the prophets and apostles;
And in the One, Holy Catholic and Apostolic Church; and we confess one baptism for the remission of sins, and look for the resurrection of the dead and the new life in the world to come. Amen.

==== Mar Thoma Syrian Church ====
We believe in one true God, the Father Almighty.

Maker of heaven and earth and of all things visible and invisible.

We believe in one Lord Jesus Christ, the only begotten Son of God, begotten of the Father before all the world. Light of Light, very God of very God, begotten, not made: who for us men and for our salvation came down from heaven and was incarnate by the Holy Spirit of the Virgin Mary, and was made man. He was crucified also for us in the days of Pontius Pilate. Suffered and died was buried. The third day He rose again by His Father’s holy will, ascended into heaven and sits at the right hand of the Father. He will come again with glory to judge both the living and the dead and of His kingdom, there will be no end.

We believe in the Holy Spirit, the Lord and giver of life, who proceeds from the Father, who with the Father and Son together is worshiped and glorified, who spoke by the prophets and apostles.

We believe in one, holy, catholic and apostolic church; we acknowledge one baptism for the remission of sins and look forward to the resurrection of the dead and the new life of the world to come. Amen.

=== Eastern Orthodox Churches ===
The text used by the Orthodox Church in America may be found at their website.

The text used by the Greek Orthodox Archdiocese of America may be found at their website.

The text used by the Antiochian Orthodox Christian Archdiocese of North America may be found at their website.

The text used by the Russian Orthodox Church Outside Russia is:

I believe in one God, the Father Almighty, Maker of Heaven and earth, and of all things visible and invisible. And in one Lord Jesus Christ, the Son of God, the Only-begotten, begotten of the Father before all ages; Light of Light: true God of true God; begotten, not made; of one essence with the Father, by Whom all things were made; Who for us men, and for our salvation, came down from the heavens, and was incarnate of the Holy Spirit and the Virgin Mary, and became man; And was crucified for us under Pontius Pilate, and suffered, and was buried; And arose again on the third day according to the Scriptures; And ascended into the heavens, and sitteth at the right hand of the Father; And shall come again, with glory, to judge both the living and the dead; Whose kingdom shall have no end. And in the Holy Spirit, the Lord, the Giver of Life; Who proceedeth from the Father; Who with the Father and the Son together is worshipped and glorified; Who spake by the prophets. In One, Holy, Catholic, and Apostolic Church. I confess one baptism for the remission of sins. I look for the resurrection of the dead, And the life of the age to come. Amen.

=== Anglican Communion ===
The 1979 Book of Common Prayer of the Episcopal Church in the United States of America version has the 1975 ecumenical (ICET) version (see above). The version in the Church of England's Common Worship of 2000 is the 1988 ecumenical (ELLC) version, but amended at the Incarnatus to read: "was incarnate from the Holy Spirit and the Virgin Mary, and was made man." The Anglican Church of Canada's Book of Alternative Services (1985) uses the 1975 ICET version but omits the Filioque ("and the Son") phrase in accordance with the 1978 Lambeth Conference Statement, and the Anglican-Orthodox Joint Doctrinal Commission. But in many churches of the Anglican Communion the version in the 1662 Book of Common Prayer is still the one in use:

I believe in one God the Father Almighty,
Maker of heaven and earth,
And of all things visible and invisible:

And in one Lord Jesus Christ, the only-begotten Son of God,
Begotten of his Father before all worlds,
God of God, Light of Light,
Very God of very God,
Begotten, not made,
Being of one substance with the Father,
By whom all things were made;
Who for us men, and for our salvation came down from heaven,
And was incarnate by the Holy Ghost of the Virgin Mary,
And was made man,
And was crucified also for us under Pontius Pilate.
He suffered and was buried,
And the third day he rose again according to the Scriptures,
And ascended into heaven,
And sitteth on the right hand of the Father.
And he shall come again with glory to judge both the quick and the dead:
Whose kingdom shall have no end.

And I believe in the Holy Ghost,
The Lord and giver of life,
Who proceedeth from the Father and the Son,
Who with the Father and the Son together is worshipped and glorified,
Who spake by the Prophets.
And I believe one Catholick and Apostolick Church.
I acknowledge one Baptism for the remission of sins.
And I look for the Resurrection of the dead,
And the life of the world to come.
Amen.

The version above, except with modernized spelling of "Catholic" and "Apostolic", is found in the 1928 (American) Book of Common Prayer, and in the Anglo-Catholic devotional manual Saint Augustine's Prayer Book (1947 and 1967 editions). The 1979 American Book of Common Prayer, in the celebration of The Holy Eucharist: Rite One, provides for the use of either the 1975 ICET version or the traditional version, identical to that found in the 1928 Prayer Book.

=== Lutheran churches ===
The version in Evangelical Lutheran Worship (2006) of the Evangelical Lutheran Church in America (ELCA) and the Evangelical Lutheran Church in Canada (ELCIC) is the 1988 ecumenical (ELLC) version. But the Lutheran Service Book (2006) of the Lutheran Church–Missouri Synod (LCMS) and the Lutheran Church–Canada (LCC) uses that of the 1662 Book of Common Prayer with slight changes, substituting the word "Christian" for "catholic" and modernizing the spelling of the word "apostolic", with changes in capitalization of this and other words, and with "Holy Spirit" in place of "Holy Ghost".

==== Missouri Synod ====
The Missouri Synod uses the following:

I believe in one God, the Father Almighty, maker of heaven and earth and of all things visible and invisible.
And in one Lord Jesus Christ, the only‐begotten Son of God, begotten of His Father before all worlds, God of God, Light of Light, very God of very God, begotten, not made, being of one substance with the Father, by whom all things were made; who for us men and for our salvation came down from heaven and was incarnate by the Holy Spirit of the virgin Mary and was made man; and was crucified also for us under Pontius Pilate. He suffered and was buried. And the third day He rose again according to the Scriptures and ascended into heaven and sits at the right hand of the Father. And He will come again with glory to judge both the living and the dead, whose kingdom will have no end.
And I believe in the Holy Spirit, the Lord and giver of life, who proceeds from the Father and the Son, who with the Father and the Son together is worshiped and glorified, who spoke by the prophets. And I believe in one holy Christian and apostolic Church I acknowledge one Baptism for the remission of sins, and I look for the resurrection of the dead and the life of the world to come. Amen.

=== Presbyterian churches ===
The Trinity Hymnal of 1990, published by the Presbyterian Church in America and the Orthodox Presbyterian Church, contains an updated language version of the 1662 Book of Common Prayer translation; this is used by those denominations and some others.

The Presbyterian Church (U.S.A.) uses a slightly different version as subscribed in their Book of Confessions.

"We believe in one God, the Father, the Almighty, maker of heaven and earth, of all that is, seen and unseen.

We believe in one Lord, Jesus Christ, the only son of God, eternally begotten of the Father, God from God, Light from Light, true God from true God. begotten, not made, of one Being with the Father; through him all things were made. For us and for our salvation, he came down from heaven, was incarnate of the Holy Spirit and the Virgin Mary and became truly human. For our sake he was crucified under Pontius Pilate; he suffered death and was buried. On the third day he rose again in accordance with the Scriptures; he ascended into heaven and is seated at the right hand of the Father. He will come again in glory to judge the living and the dead, and his kingdom will have no end.

We believe in the Holy Spirit, the Lord, the giver of life, who proceeds from the Father and the Son, who with the Father and the Son is worshipped and glorified, who has spoken through the prophets. We believe in one holy catholic and apostolic Church. We acknowledge one baptism for the forgiveness of sins. We look for the resurrection of the dead, and the life of the world to come. Amen."

== Liturgical versions no longer in use ==
=== 1973 draft ICET text ===
While working towards the 1975 ecumenical text given above, the International Consultation on English Texts (ICET) published a version, which the Roman Catholic Church in the United States adopted in its English version of the Roman Missal, in use from 1973 to 2011.

"One in Being with the Father" (1973), which, when spoken, could be confused with "one, in being with the Father", was replaced in the 1975 version by "of one Being with the Father".

"He was born of the Virgin Mary, and became man" was altered in 1975 to "He became incarnate from the Virgin Mary, and was made man": neither Greek "σαρκωθέντα" nor Latin "incarnatus" means "born", and the 1973 text linked hominization ("became man") with birth ("he was born").

"He suffered, died, and was buried" was replaced in 1975 by "he suffered death and was buried": "παθόντα" in Greek and "passus" in Latin are indicative of a suffering demise; but the 1973 text inserted an extra verb, "died", not present in the original Greek or Latin.

== Versions by scholars ==
=== Philip Schaff ===
==== Nicene Creed as adopted in 325 ====
We believe in one God, the Father Almighty, Maker of all things visible and invisible.
And in one Lord Jesus Christ, the Son of God, begotten of the Father the only-begotten; that is, of the essence of the Father, God of God, Light of Light, very God of very God, begotten, not made, being of one substance (ὁμοούσιον) with the Father; by whom all things were made both in heaven and on earth; who for us men, and for our salvation, came down and was incarnate and was made man; he suffered, and the third day he rose again, ascended into heaven; from thence he shall come to judge the quick and the dead.
And in the Holy Ghost.
But those who say: 'There was a time when he was not;' and 'He was not before he was made;' and 'He was made out of nothing,' or 'He is of another substance' or 'essence,' or 'The Son of God is created,' or 'changeable,' or 'alterable'—they are condemned by the holy catholic and apostolic Church.

==== Nicene Creed as altered in 381 ====
I believe in one God, the Father Almighty, Maker of heaven and earth, and of all things visible and invisible.
I believe in one Lord Jesus Christ, the only-begotten Son of God, begotten of the Father before all worlds (æons), Light of Light, very God of very God, begotten, not made, being of one substance with the Father; by whom all things were made; who for us men, and for our salvation, came down from heaven, and was incarnate by the Holy Ghost of the Virgin Mary, and was made man; he was crucified for us under Pontius Pilate, and suffered, and was buried, and the third day he rose again, according to the Scriptures, and ascended into heaven, and sitteth on the right hand of the Father; from thence he shall come again, with glory, to judge the quick and the dead; whose kingdom shall have no end.
And in the Holy Ghost, the Lord and Giver of life, who proceedeth from the Father, who with the Father and the Son together is worshiped and glorified, who spake by the prophets. In one holy catholic and apostolic Church; we acknowledge one baptism for the remission of sins; we look for the resurrection of the dead, and the life of the world to come. Amen.

=== J.N.D. Kelly ===
... Whom all things came into being, things in heaven and things on earth, Who because of us men and because of our salvation came down and became incarnate, becoming man, suffered and rose again on the third day, ascended to the heavens, will come to judge the living and the dead;
And in the Holy Spirit.
But as for those who say, There was when He was not, and, Before being born he was not, and that He came into existence out of nothing, or who assert that the Son of God is of a different hypostasis or substance, or is subject to alteration or change – these the Catholic and apostolic Church anathemizes.

A translation of the 381 version may also be found in Kelly's Early Christian Creeds.

=== Mingana's translation of Theodore of Mopsuestia (Creed of 325) ===
I believe in one God, Father Almighty, Creator of all things visible and invisible.
And in one Lord Jesus Christ the Only Begotten Son of God, the first-born of all the creatures.
Who was born before all the worlds, and not made.
True God of true God.
Consubstantial with the Father.
By Whom the worlds were made and all things were created.
Who for us children of men and for our salvation came down from heaven, was incarnate and became a man.
And was born of the Virgin Mary and crucified in the days of Pontius Pilate.
And was buried and rose the third day according to the Scriptures.
And ascended into heaven and sat at the right hand of God.
And He shall come again to judge the living and the dead.
And in the Holy Spirit.

=== Samuel Noble's translation of Al-Majdalus (Creed of 381) ===
We believe in one God, Father almighty, the Creator of heaven and earth, what is seen and what is not seen.
We believe in one Lord, Jesus Christ, the only son of God, begotten from the Father before all ages
Light from light, true God from true God, begotten, not created, equal to the Father in essence
who for the sake of us men and for the sake of our salvation came down from heaven
and became incarnate of the Holy Spirit and the Virgin Mary.
He suffered and was buried
and rose on the third day.
He ascended into heaven and sits at the right hand of the Father in the heights
and He will also come in glory to judge the living and the dead, whose kingdom has no passing away or end.
We believe in the Holy Spirit, the Lord, the giver of life, who proceeds, whom we worship and glorify with the Father and the Son, who speaks in the prophets.
We confess one baptism for the forgiveness of sins.
We hope for the resurrection of the dead and the life of the age to come, amen

== Versions used in prayer books but not in proper liturgy ==
=== A Catholic prayer book of 1850 ===
I believe in one God, the Father almighty, Maker of heaven and earth, and of all things visible and invisible.
And in one Lord Jesus Christ, the only-begotten Son of God, born of the Father before all ages. God of God; Light of Light; true God of true God; begotten not made; consubstantial with the Father, by whom all things were made. Who for us men, and for our salvation, came down from heaven, and was incarnate by the Holy Ghost of the Virgin Mary: and was made man. He was crucified also for us, suffered under Pontius Pilate, and was buried. The third day he rose again according to the Scriptures; and ascended into heaven, and sitteth at the right hand of the Father: and he shall come again with glory to judge both the living and the dead: of whose kingdom there shall be no end.
And I believe in the Holy Ghost, the Lord and life-giver, who proceedeth from the Father and the Son: who together with the Father and the Son is adored and glorified; who spake by the prophets. And one holy Catholic and Apostolic Church. I confess one baptism for the remission of sins. And I look for the resurrection of the dead, and the life of the world to come. Amen.

Note the linking of "under Pontius Pilate" with "suffered", not with "was crucified".

== Sources ==
- Kelly, John N. D. (2006) [1972]. Early Christian Creeds (3rd ed.). London-New York: Continuum. ISBN 9780826492166.
