= The Text This Week =

The Text This Week is a Web site devoted to the study of the Christian Bible and the conduct of Christian worship.

The site is organised in terms of the passages of scripture recommended for reading each Sunday (and on other days) in the lectionaries of the major Christian denominations, and in particular in the Revised Common Lectionary, which is widely used in many denominations and countries. However all the resources are available at all times, and the site is indexed by the bible passages as well as by the calendar.

The site contains comprehensive references to historic bible commentaries and worship resources that are in the public domain and available on the world wide web, and also to works of modern scholarship and to subscription web sites. It is international in scope, though most (not all) of the resources it indexes are in English. It is constantly updated. The site is theologically, denominationally and liturgically eclectic. As a result, it is used and respected by preachers world-wide.

The Text This Week was founded and is maintained by Jenee Woodard, a member of the United Methodist Church in Sioux Falls, South Dakota.
