= Icet =

ICET, ICE.T or variants may refer to:

== People ==
- Ice-T (born 1958), American rapper and actor
- Allen Icet (born 1957), Missouri politician

== Other ==
- Ice tea or Iced tea, a beverage made from tea and ice
- ICE T, a variant of the German ICE high-speed train
- Aechmea 'Ice-T', a Bromeliad cultivar flowering plant
- Institute for the Certification of Engineering Technicians, part of the National Institute for Certification in Engineering Technologies
- International Coalition to End Torture, a global NGO
- International Consultation on English Texts, now named the English Language Liturgical Consultation, a worldwide association

== See also ==
- Intermodal Surface Transportation Efficiency Act (ISTEA)
