= History of the Lord's Prayer in English =

The Lord's Prayer has been translated and updated throughout the history of the English language. Here are examples which show the major developments:

== Translations of Matthew 6:9b–13 ==
The text of the Matthean Lord's Prayer in the King James Version (KJV) of the Bible ultimately derives from first Old English translations. Not considering the doxology, only five words of the KJV are later borrowings directly from the Latin Vulgate (these being debts, debtors, temptation, deliver, and amen). Early English translations such as the Wycliffe and the Old English, however, were themselves translations of the Latin Vulgate.

=== Old English ===
c. AD 940, Lindesfarne Gospels

Fader ūrer ðū arð ł
ðū bist in heofnum ł
in heofnas sīe gehālgud noma ðīn
to cymeð rīc ðīn
sīe willo ðīn
suǣ is in heofne ⁊ in eorðo
hlāf ūserne oferwistlīc sel ūs tōdæg ⁊
forgef ūs scylda ūsra
suǣ wē forgēfon scyldgum ūsum ⁊
ne inlǣd ūsih in costunge
ah gefrig ūsich from yfle

AD 995, West Saxon

Fæder ūre
þū þē eart on heofonum
Sī þīn nama gehālgod
Tō becume þīn rice
Gewurþe þīn willa
On erðon swā swā on heofonum
Urne gedæghwamlīcan hlāf syle ūs tō dæg
And forgyf ūs ūre gyltas
Swā swā wē forgyfð ūrum gyltendum.
And ne gelæd þū ūs on costnunge
Ac alȳs ūs of yfele.
-
-
Sōþlice.

=== Middle English ===
14th Century, Paues

Oure Fader
that art in hevene
halewed be thi name.
Thi kyngdom come to us.
Thi wylle be don,
as in hevene, & in erthe.
Oure eche dayes breed geve us to day.
& forgeve us oure dettys,
as we forgeve oure dettourys.
And ne lede us not in temptacyon,
but delyuere us of yvel.
-
-
Amen.

AD 1389 Wycliffe

Oure fadir
That art in hevenes
Halwid be thi name
Thi kingdom come to
Be thi wille don
On erthe as in hevenes
Give to us this day oure bred ovir othir substaunce
And forgiv us oure dettis
As we forgiven oure dettours
And lede us not in to temptacioun
But delyevr us from yvel
-
-
Amen.

=== Early Modern English ===
AD 1526 Tyndale

O oure father which arte in heven,
halowed be thy name;
let thy kingdom come;
thy wyll be fulfilled
as well in erth as hit ys in heven;
geve vs this daye oure dayly breade;
and forgeve vs oure treaspases,
even as we forgeve them which treaspas vs;
leede vs not into temptacion,
but delyvre vs ffrom yvell.
For thyne is the kingdom and the power,
and the glorye for ever.
Amen.

AD 1611 King James Version

Our father which art in heauen,
hallowed be thy name
Thy kingdome come.
Thy will be done,
in earth, as it is in heauen.
Giue vs this day our daily bread.
And forgiue vs our debts,
as we forgiue our debters.
And lead vs not into temptation,
but deliuer vs from euill:
For thine is the kingdome, and the power,
and the glory, for euer,
Amen.

=== Modern English ===
AD 1901 American Standard Version

Our Father who art in heaven,
Hallowed be thy name
Thy kingdom come.
Thy will be done,
as in heaven, so on earth.
Give us this day our daily bread,
And forgive us our debts,
as we also have forgiven our debtors.
And bring us not into temptation,
but deliver us from the evil one.

AD 1989 New Revised Standard Version

Our Father in heaven,
hallowed be your name.
Your kingdom come.
Your will be done,
on earth as it is in heaven.
Give us this day our daily bread.
And forgive us our debts,
as we also have forgiven our debtors.
And do not bring us to the time of trial,
but rescue us from the evil one.

== Other liturgical sources ==
AD 1549 Anglican BCP

Our father, whyche art in heaven,
halowed be thy name.
Thy Kyngdome come.
Thy wyll be doen in yearth,
as it is in heaven.
Geve us this daye our dayly breade.
And forgeve us our trespaces,
as wee forgeve them that trespasse agaynst us.
And leade us not into temptacion.
But deliver us from evill.
-
-
Amen.

AD 1662 Anglican BCP

Our Father, which art in heaven,
Hallowed be thy Name.
Thy kingdom come.
Thy will be done,
in earth as it is in heaven.
Give us this day our daily bread.
And forgive us our trespasses,
As we forgive them that trespass against us.
And lead us not into temptation;
But deliver us from evil:
[For thine is the kingdom, the power,
and the glory, for ever and ever.]
Amen.

1759 Ordo administrandi sacramenta

Our Father who art in heaven,
hallowed be thy name.
Thy kingdom come.
Thy will be done
on earth as it is in heaven.
Give us this day our daily bread,
and forgive us our trespasses,
as we forgive them that trespass against us,
and lead us not into temptation,
but deliver us from evil.
-
-
Amen.

AD 1772 Anglican BCP

Our Father, which art in heaven;
Hallowed by thy Name.
Thy kingdom come.
Thy will be done in earth,
As it is in heaven.
Give us this day our daily bread.
And forgive us our trespasses,
As we forgive them that trespass against us.
And lead us not into temptation;
But deliver us from evil:
[For thine is the kingdom, :and the power,
and the glory, for ever and ever.]
Amen.

Baltimore Catechism 1885

Our Father, who art in heaven,
hallowed be Thy name:
Thy kingdom come;
Thy will be done on earth
as it is in heaven.
Give us this day our daily bread;
and forgive us our trespasses
as we forgive those who trespass against us:
and lead us not into temptation,
but deliver us from evil.
-
-
Amen.

The 1892 U.S. BCP

OUR Father who art in heaven,
Hallowed be thy Name.
Thy kingdom come.
Thy will be done on earth,
As it is in heaven.
Give us this day our daily bread.
And forgive us our trespasses,
As we forgive those who trespass against us.
And lead us not into temptation;
But deliver us from evil:
[For thine is the kingdom, and the power,
and the glory, for ever and ever.]
Amen.

AD 1928 Anglican BCP

Our Father, who art in heaven,
Hallowed be thy Name.
Thy kingdom come.
Thy will be done,
On earth as it is in heaven.
Give us this day our daily bread.
And forgive us our trespasses,
As we forgive those who trespass against us.
And lead us not into temptation,
But deliver us from evil.
For thine is the kingdom, and the power,
and the glory, for ever and ever.
Amen.

AD 1988 ELLC

Our Father in heaven,
hallowed be your name,
your kingdom come,
your will be done,
on earth as in heaven.
Give us today our daily bread.
Forgive us our sins
as we forgive those who sin against us.
Save us from the time of trial
and deliver us from evil.
[For the kingdom, the power,
and the glory are yours now and for ever.]
Amen.

AD 2000 Church of England Common Worship

Our Father in heaven,
hallowed be your name,
your kingdom come,
your will be done,
on earth as in heaven.
Give us today our daily bread.
Forgive us our sins
as we forgive those who sin against us.
Lead us not into temptation
but deliver us from evil.
For the kingdom, the power,
and the glory are yours
now and for ever.
Amen.

AD 2011 Catholic Roman Missal

Our Father who art in heaven,
hallowed be thy name;
thy kingdom come;
thy will be done
on earth as it is in heaven.
Give us this day our daily bread,
and forgive us our trespasses,
as we forgive those who trespass against us;
and lead us not into temptation,
but deliver us from evil.

== Other versions ==
1768 Benjamin Franklin

Heavenly Father,
May all revere thee,
And become thy dutiful Children and faithful Subjects.
May thy Laws be obeyed on Earth as perfectly as they are in Heaven.
Provide for us this Day as thou has hitherto daily done.
Forgive us our Trespasses, and enable us likewise to forgive those that offend us.
Keep us out of Temptation, and deliver us from Evil.
