= Economic Social Legal Pathways =

Non-profit multidisciplinary, collaborative organization

Economic Social Legal Pathways (ESLP)
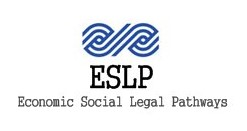
- Founded: 2015
- Type: Non-profit; NGO
- Location: California
- Services: Human services and research
- Fields: Poverty, Economics, Social Sciences and Law
- Key people: Aung Zarni (CEO, President)
- Website: www.eslp.org

Economic Social Legal Pathways (ESLP) is a non-profit multidisciplinary, collaborative organization that provides a continuum of services, advocacy, and produces research, research-based policy prescriptions, and curricular innovation on the most challenging poverty, homelessness, civil rights, education, criminal justice, family and economic security, immigration and healthcare issues facing California and the United States.

In 2013, Aung Zarni launched Economic Social Legal Pathways at Harvard University with a mission to engage the most difficult topics in a wide range of legal and public policy subject areas, providing valuable intellectual capital to public and private sector leaders, the media and the general public, while advancing scholarly understanding. Central to its methods are concerted efforts to build bridges connecting the world of research with the world of civic action and policy debate so that each informs the other. In 2015, ESLP was registered with the Secretary of State of California as a non-profit charitable organization.

== Work ==
The mission of ESLP is to improve community health through direct services, innovation and research. ESLP pioneers programs aimed at effecting lasting social change through economic and community development.

ESLP conducts research, advocacy and a continuum of services that support vulnerable people, including those living with chronic and multiple medical and mental health conditions, people living in poverty, people experiencing homelessness, the unemployed and underemployed, and those with limited access to services due to cultural or language barriers.

ESLP is unique in its model of nonprofit corporate approach to social service. Its administrative structure combines the widest possible delegation of authority and responsibility to individual program units with a centralized, independently audited accounting system.

== Human Rights Award ==
In October 2015, ESLP received the 2015 Human Rights Award for excellence in human rights advocacy and legal research by the International Coalition to End Torture.
