= Nicene Creed =

Statement of belief adopted at the First Ecumenical Council in 325

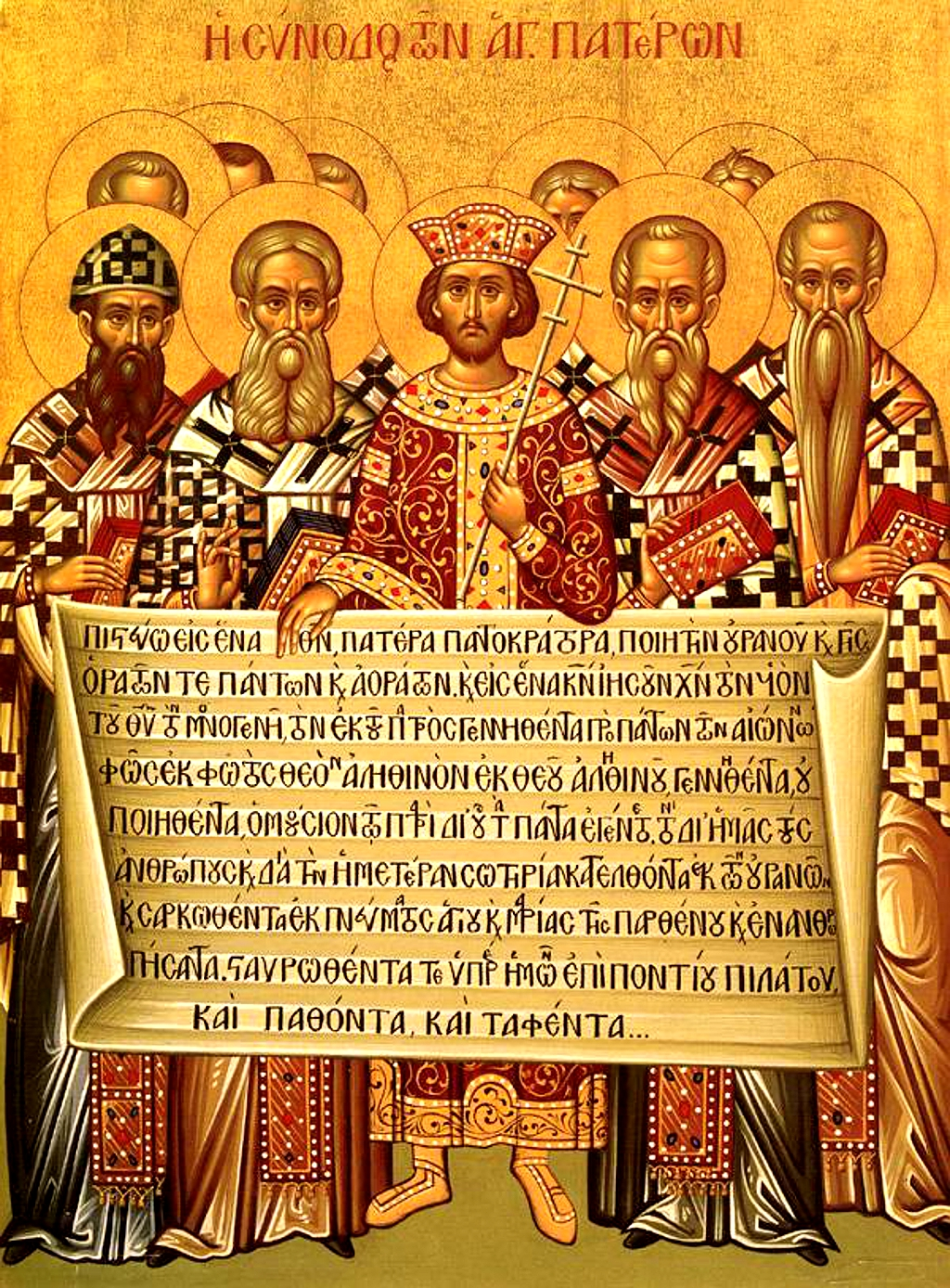
Icon depicting Constantine the Great, accompanied by the bishops of the First Council of Nicaea (325), holding the Niceno-Constantinopolitan Creed of 381. First line of main text in Greek: Πιστεύω εἰς ἕνα Θ[εό]ν, πατέρα παντοκράτορα, ποιητὴν οὐρανοῦ κ[αὶ] γῆς. Translation: "I believe in one God, the Father, the Almighty, Maker of heaven and earth."

The Nicene Creed (Note: /ˈnaɪsiːn/; Koine Greek: Σύμβολον τῆς Νικαίας, romanized: Sýmvolon tis Nikéas) is the original statement of belief of Nicene Christianity, including the many Christian denominations that adhere to it. The original version was adopted at the First Council of Nicaea in 325. According to the traditional view, forwarded by the Council of Chalcedon of 451, the Creed was amended in 381 by the First Council of Constantinople as "consonant to the holy and great Synod of Nice". Further, a creed "almost identical in form" was used as early as 374 by St. Epiphanius of Salamis. The amended form is also known as the Niceno-Constantinopolitan Creed.

The Nicene Creed is part of the profession of faith required of those undertaking important functions within the Assyrian Church of the East, Ancient Church of the East, Oriental Orthodox Churches, Eastern Orthodox Church, Catholic, Lutheran, Anglican, Methodist and other Protestant traditions including the Waldensian and Reformed (Continental Reformed, Presbyterian), Congregationalist and Baptist. Nicene Christianity regards Jesus as divine and "begotten of the Father". Various conflicting theological views existed before the fourth century, and these disagreements would eventually spur the ecumenical councils to develop the Nicene Creed. Various non-Nicene beliefs have emerged and re-emerged since the fourth century, all of which are considered heresies by adherents of Nicene Christianity.

In the liturgical churches of Western Christianity, the Nicene Creed is in use alongside the less widespread Apostles' Creed and Athanasian Creed. An affirmation of faith, by default the Nicene Creed, is usually said immediately after the sermon or homily following the Gospel reading at the Eucharist, at least on Sundays and major festivals. In musical settings, particularly when sung in Latin, this creed is usually referred to by its first word, Credo. On Sundays and solemnities, one of these two creeds is recited in the Roman Rite Mass after the homily. In the Byzantine Rite, the Nicene Creed is sung or recited at the Divine Liturgy, immediately preceding the Anaphora (eucharistic prayer) is also recited daily at compline. The current authoritative English translation in use in the Catholic Church since 2011 was done by the International Commission on English in the Liturgy.

Creedal scholar J.N.D. Kelly suggests that since the First Council of Constantinople was not considered ecumenical until the Council of Chalcedon in 451, the absence of documentation during this period does not logically necessitate rejecting the amended creed as an expansion of the original Nicene Creed of 325.

== History ==
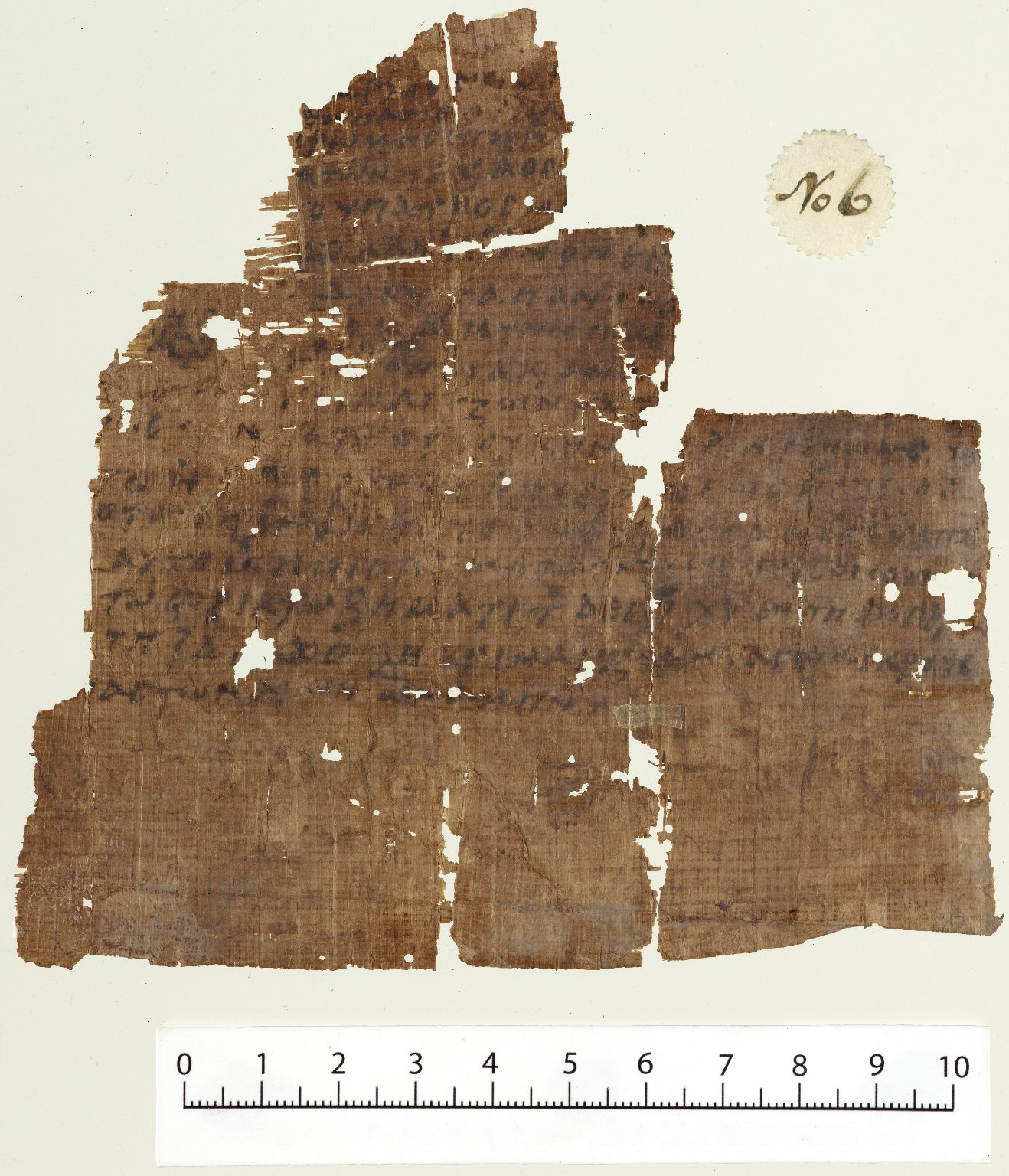
The oldest extant manuscript of the Nicene Creed, dated to the 6th century

Crucial formulation in the Greek of the creed shown in the icon above: homoousion tooi p(a)tri ('of one Being with the Father')

The purpose of a creed is to provide a doctrinal statement of correct belief among Christians amid controversy. The creeds of Christianity have been drawn up at times of conflict about doctrine: acceptance or rejection of a creed served to distinguish believers and heretics, particularly the adherents of Arianism. For that reason, a creed was called in Greek a σύμβολον, symbolon, which originally meant half of a broken object which, when fitted to the other half, verified the bearer's identity. The Greek word passed through Latin symbolum into English "symbol", which only later took on the meaning of an outward sign of something.

The Nicene Creed was adopted to resolve the Arian controversy, whose leader, Arius, a clergyman of Alexandria, "objected to Alexander's (the bishop of the time) apparent carelessness in blurring the distinction of nature between the Father and the Son by his emphasis on eternal generation". Emperor Constantine called the Council at Nicaea to resolve the dispute in the church, which resulted from the widespread adoption of Arius' teachings, which threatened to destabilize the entire Roman Empire. Following the formulation of the Nicene Creed, Arius' teachings were henceforth marked as heresy.

The Nicene Creed of 325 explicitly affirms the Father as the "one God" and as the "Almighty", and Jesus Christ as "the Son of God", as "begotten of [...] the essence of the Father", and therefore as "consubstantial with the Father", meaning, "of the same substance" as the Father; "very God of very God". The Creed of 325 does mention the Holy Spirit but not as "God" or as "consubstantial with the Father". The 381 revision of the creed at Constantinople (i.e., the Niceno-Constantinopolitan Creed), which is often simply referred to as the "Nicene Creed", speaks of the Holy Spirit as worshipped and glorified with the Father and the Son.

The Athanasian Creed, formulated approximately a century later, is not the product of any known church council and is not used in Eastern Christianity. It describes in much greater detail the relationship between the Father, the Son, and the Holy Spirit. The earlier Apostles' Creed, apparently formulated before the Arian controversy arose in the fourth century, does not describe the Son or the Holy Spirit as "God" or as "consubstantial with the Father".

Thomas Aquinas stated that the phrase for us men, and for our salvation was to refute the error of Origen, "who alleged that by the power of Christ's Passion even the devils were to be set free". He also stated that the phrases stating Jesus was made incarnate by the Holy Spirit was to refute the Manicheans "so that we may believe that He assumed true flesh and not a phantastic body", and He came down from Heaven was to refute the error of Photinus, "who asserted that Christ was no more than a man". Furthermore, the phrase and He was made man was to "exclude the error of Nestorius, according to whose contention the Son of God ... would be said to dwell in man [rather] than to be man."

=== Original Nicene Creed of 325 ===
The original Nicene Creed was first adopted at the First Council of Nicaea, which opened on 19 June 325. The text ends with anathemas against Arian propositions, preceded by the words: "We believe in the Holy Spirit" which terminates the statements of belief.

F. J. A. Hort and Adolf von Harnack argued that the Nicene Creed was the local creed of Caesarea (an important center of Early Christianity) recited in the council by Eusebius of Caesarea. Their case relied largely on a particular interpretation of Eusebius' account of the council's proceedings. More recent scholarship has not been convinced by their arguments. The large number of secondary divergences from the text of the creed quoted by Eusebius make it unlikely that it was used as a starting point by those who drafted the conciliar creed. Their initial text was probably a local creed from a Syro-Palestinian source into which they inserted phrases to define the Nicene theology. The Eusebian Creed may thus have been either a second or one of many nominations for the Nicene Creed.

The 1911 Catholic Encyclopedia says that soon after the Council of Nicaea the church composed new formulae of faith, most of them variations of the Nicene Symbol, to meet new phases of Arianism, of which there were at least four before the Council of Sardica (341), at which a new form was presented and inserted in its acts. However, the council did not accept it.

=== Niceno-Constantinopolitan Creed ===
What is known as the "Niceno-Constantinopolitan Creed" or the "Nicene-Constantinopolitan Creed", (Note: Both names are familiar. Instances of the former are in the Oxford Dictionary of the Christian Church and in the Roman Missal, while the latter is used consistently by the Faith and Order Commission. "Constantinopolitan Creed" can also be found, but very rarely.) received this name because it was adopted at the Second Ecumenical Council held in Constantinople in 381 as a modification of the original Nicene Creed of 325. In that light, it also became very commonly known simply as the "Nicene Creed". It is the only authoritative ecumenical statement of the Christian faith accepted by the Catholic Church (with the addition of the Filioque), the Eastern Orthodox Church, Oriental Orthodoxy, the Church of the East, and much of Protestantism including the Anglican communion. (The Apostles' and Athanasian creeds are not as widely accepted.)

It differs in several respects, both by addition and omission, from the creed adopted at the First Council of Nicaea. The most notable difference is the additional section:

And [we believe] in the Holy Ghost, the Lord and Giver-of-Life, who proceedeth from the Father, who with the Father and the Son together is worshipped and glorified, who spake by the prophets. And [we believe] in one, holy, catholic and Apostolic Church. We acknowledge one Baptism for the remission of sins, [and] we look for the resurrection of the dead and the life of the world to come. Amen.

Since the end of the 19th century, scholars have questioned the traditional explanation of the origin of this creed, which has been passed down in the name of the council, whose official acts have been lost over time. A local council of Constantinople in 382 and the Third Ecumenical Council (Council of Ephesus of 431) made no mention of it, with the latter affirming the 325 creed of Nicaea as a valid statement of the faith and using it to denounce Nestorianism. Though some scholarship claims that hints of the later creed's existence are discernible in some writings, no extant document gives its text or makes explicit mention of it earlier than the Fourth Ecumenical Council at Chalcedon in 451. Many of the bishops of the 451 council themselves had never heard of it and initially greeted it skeptically, but it was then produced from the episcopal archives of Constantinople, and the council accepted it "not as supplying any omission but as an authentic interpretation of the faith of Nicaea". Despite the questions raised, it is considered most likely that this creed was introduced at the 381 Second Ecumenical Council.

Based on evidence both internal and external to the text, it has been argued that this creed originated not as an editing of the original Creed proposed at Nicaea in 325, but as an independent creed (probably an older baptismal creed) modified to make it more like the Nicene Creed. Some scholars have argued that the creed may have been presented at Chalcedon as "a precedent for drawing up new creeds and definitions to supplement the Creed of Nicaea, as a way of getting round the ban on new creeds in Canon 7 of Ephesus". It is generally agreed that the Niceno-Constantinopolitan Creed is not simply an expansion of the Creed of Nicaea, and was probably based on another traditional creed independent of the one from Nicaea.

The Third Ecumenical Council (Ephesus) reaffirmed the original version of 325 (Note: It was the original 325 creed, not the one attributed to the Second Ecumenical Council in 381, that was recited at the Council of Ephesus.) of the Nicene Creed and declared that "it is unlawful for any man to bring forward, or to write, or to compose a different (ἑτέραν) faith as a rival to that established by the holy Fathers assembled with the Holy Ghost in Nicaea" (i.e., the 325 creed). The word ἑτέραν is more accurately translated as used by the council to mean "different", "contradictory", rather than "another". This statement has been interpreted as a prohibition against changing this creed or composing others, but not all accept this interpretation. This question is connected with the controversy whether a creed proclaimed by an ecumenical council is definitive in excluding not only excisions from its text but also additions to it.

In one respect, the Eastern Orthodox Church's received text of the Niceno-Constantinopolitan Creed differs from the earliest text, which is included in the acts of the Council of Chalcedon of 451: The Eastern Orthodox Church uses the singular forms of verbs such as "I believe", in place of the plural form ("we believe") used by the council. Byzantine Rite Eastern Catholic Churches use the same form of the creed, since the Catholic Church teaches that it is wrong to add "and the Son" to the Greek verb "ἐκπορευόμενον", though correct to add it to the Latin "qui procedit", which does not have precisely the same meaning. The form generally used in Western churches does add "and the Son" and also the phrase "God from God", which is found in the original 325 Creed.

=== Comparison between the creed of 325 and the creed of 381 ===
The following table, which indicates by square brackets the portions of the 325 text that were omitted or moved in 381, and uses italics to indicate what phrases, absent in the 325 text, were added in 381, juxtaposes the earlier (AD 325) and later (AD 381) forms of this creed in the English translation given in Philip Schaff's compilation The Creeds of Christendom (1877).

First Council of Nicaea (325)	First Council of Constantinople (381)
We believe in one God, the Father Almighty, Maker of all things visible and invisible.	We believe in one God, the Father Almighty, Maker of heaven and earth, and of all things visible and invisible.
And in one Lord Jesus Christ, the Son of God, begotten of the Father [the only-begotten; that is, of the essence of the Father, God of God,] Light of Light, very God of very God, begotten, not made, consubstantial with the Father;	And in one Lord Jesus Christ, the only-begotten Son of God, begotten of the Father before all worlds (æons), Light of Light, very God of very God, begotten, not made, consubstantial with the Father;
By whom all things were made [both in heaven and on earth];	by whom all things were made;
Who for us men, and for our salvation, came down and was incarnate and was made man;	who for us men, and for our salvation, came down from heaven, and was incarnate by the Holy Ghost and of the Virgin Mary, and was made man;
He suffered, and the third day he rose again, ascended into heaven;	he was crucified for us under Pontius Pilate, and suffered, and was buried, and the third day he rose again, according to the Scriptures, and ascended into heaven, and sitteth on the right hand of the Father;
From thence he shall come to judge the quick and the dead.	from thence he shall come again, with glory, to judge the quick and the dead;
	whose kingdom shall have no end.
And in the Holy Ghost.	And in the Holy Ghost, the Lord and Giver of life, who proceedeth from the Father, who with the Father and the Son together is worshiped and glorified, who spoke by the prophets.
	In one holy catholic and apostolic Church; we acknowledge one baptism for the remission of sins; we look for the resurrection of the dead, and the life of the world to come. Amen.
[But those who say: 'There was a time when he was not;' and 'He was not before he was made;' and 'He was made out of nothing,' or 'He is of another substance' or 'essence,' or 'The Son of God is created,' or 'changeable,' or 'alterable'— they are condemned by the holy catholic and apostolic Church.]	
The differences between the actual wordings (in Greek) adopted in 325 and in 381 can be presented similarly, as follows:
First Council of Nicaea (325)	First Council of Constantinople (381)
Πιστεύομεν εἰς ἕνα Θεὸν Πατέρα παντοκράτορα, πάντων ὁρατῶν τε καὶ ἀοράτων ποιητήν·	Πιστεύομεν εἰς ἕνα Θεὸν Πατέρα παντοκράτορα, ποιητὴν οὐρανοῦ καὶ γῆς, ὁρατῶν τε πάντων καὶ ἀοράτων.
καὶ εἰς ἕνα Κύριον Ἰησοῦν Χριστόν τὸν Υἱὸν τοῦ Θεοῦ, γεννηθέντα ἐκ τοῦ Πατρὸς [μονογενῆ, τοὐτέστιν ἐκ τῆς οὐσίας τοῦ Πατρός, Θεὸν ἐκ Θεοῦ,] Φῶς ἐκ Φωτός, Θεὸν ἀληθινὸν ἐκ Θεοῦ ἀληθινοῦ, γεννηθέντα, οὐ ποιηθέντα, ὁμοούσιον τῷ Πατρί,	Καὶ εἰς ἕνα Κύριον Ἰησοῦν Χριστόν, τὸν Υἱὸν τοῦ Θεοῦ τὸν μονογενῆ, τὸν ἐκ τοῦ Πατρὸς γεννηθέντα πρὸ πάντων τῶν αἰώνων, φῶς ἐκ φωτός, Θεὸν ἀληθινὸν ἐκ Θεοῦ ἀληθινοῦ, γεννηθέντα οὐ ποιηθέντα, ὁμοούσιον τῷ Πατρί·
δι' οὗ τὰ πάντα ἐγένετο, [τά τε ἐν τῷ οὐρανῷ καὶ τὰ ἐν τῇ γῇ,]	δι' οὗ τὰ πάντα ἐγένετο·
τὸν δι' ἡμᾶς τοὺς ἀνθρώπους καὶ διὰ τὴν ἡμετέραν σωτηρίαν κατελθόντα καὶ σαρκωθέντα καὶ ἐνανθρωπήσαντα,	τὸν δι' ἡμᾶς τοὺς ἀνθρώπους καὶ διὰ τὴν ἡμετέραν σωτηρίαν κατελθόντα ἐκ τῶν οὐρανῶν καὶ σαρκωθέντα ἐκ Πνεύματος Ἁγίου καὶ Μαρίας τῆς παρθένου καὶ ἐνανθρωπήσαντα,
παθόντα, καὶ ἀναστάντα τῇ τρίτῃ ἡμέρᾳ, ἀνελθόντα εἰς τοὺς οὐρανούς,	σταυρωθέντα τε ὑπὲρ ἡμῶν ἐπὶ Ποντίου Πιλάτου, καὶ παθόντα καὶ ταφέντα, καὶ ἀναστάντα τῇ τρίτῃ ἡμέρᾳ κατὰ τὰς γραφάς, καὶ ἀνελθόντα εἰς τοὺς οὐρανούς, καὶ καθεζόμενον ἐκ δεξιῶν τοῦ Πατρός,
ἐρχόμενον κρῖναι ζῶντας καὶ νεκρούς.	καὶ πάλιν ἐρχόμενον μετὰ δόξης κρῖναι ζῶντας καὶ νεκρούς·
	οὗ τῆς βασιλείας οὐκ ἔσται τέλος.
Καὶ εἰς τὸ Ἅγιον Πνεῦμα.	Καὶ εἰς τὸ Πνεῦμα τὸ Ἅγιον, τὸ Κύριον, τὸ ζῳοποιόν, τὸ ἐκ τοῦ Πατρὸς ἐκπορευόμενον, τὸ σὺν Πατρὶ καὶ Υἱῷ συμπροσκυνούμενον καὶ συνδοξαζόμενον, τὸ λαλῆσαν διὰ τῶν προφητῶν. Εἰς μίαν, ἁγίαν, καθολικὴν καὶ ἀποστολικὴν Ἐκκλησίαν· ὁμολογοῦμεν ἓν βάπτισμα εἰς ἄφεσιν ἁμαρτιῶν· προσδοκοῦμεν ἀνάστασιν νεκρῶν, καὶ ζωὴν τοῦ μέλλοντος αἰῶνος. Ἀμήν.
[Τοὺς δὲ λέγοντας, Ἦν ποτε ὅτε οὐκ ἦν, καὶ Πρὶν γεννηθῆναι οὐκ ἦν, καὶ ὅτι Ἐξ οὐκ ὄντων εγένετο, ἢ Ἐξ ἑτέρας ὑποστάσεως ἢ οὐσίας φάσκοντας εἶναι, ἢ κτιστόν, ἢ τρεπτόν, ἢ ἀλλοιωτὸν τὸν Υἱὸν τοῦ Θεοῦ, τούτους ἀναθεματίζει ἡ ἁγία καθολικὴ καὶ ἀποστολικὴ ἐκκλησία].	

=== Filioque controversy ===
In the late 6th century, some Latin-speaking churches added the word Filioque ("and the Son") to the description of the procession of the Holy Spirit, in what many Eastern Orthodox Christians have at a later stage argued is a violation of Canon VII of the Third Ecumenical Council, since the words were not included in the text by either the Council of Nicaea or the Council of Constantinople. This was incorporated into the liturgical practice of Rome in 1014. Filioque eventually became one of the leading causes for the East-West Schism in 1054, and the failures of the repeated union attempts.

=== Views on the importance of this creed ===
Nearly all Christian denominations, including Catholic, Orthodox, and most Protestant churches (e.g., Lutherans, Anglicans, Methodists, Continental Reformed, Presbyterians, Congregationalists and Baptists), regard the Nicene Creed as a foundational and authoritative statement of faith. Thus approximately 98.5% of the world's Christians are Nicene Christians, adhering to the Nicene Creed's Trinitarian and Christological doctrines. The remaining 1.5% include non-Trinitarian groups such as the LDS Church, Jehovah's Witnesses, Swedenborgians, etc. (see below).

As mentioned above, there are a minority of Evangelical and non-denominational groups, such as some independent Churches of Christ, certain neo-charismatic congregations, or some fundamentalist churches, who view the Nicene Creed as a helpful summary of biblical truth but not authoritative, emphasizing that only the Bible is authoritative and rule of faith and practice. Furthermore, certain non-Trinitarian groups explicitly reject the Nicene Creed's Trinitarian doctrines: examples include the Church of the New Jerusalem and Jehovah's Witnesses, whose theologies are incompatible with the Creed's teachings on the Trinity and Christ's divinity.

The view that the Nicene Creed can serve as a touchstone of genuine Christian faith is reflected in the name "symbol of faith", which was given to it in Greek and Latin, when in those languages the word "symbol" meant a "token for identification (by comparison with a counterpart)". In the Roman Rite Mass, the Latin text of the Niceno-Constantinopolitan Creed, with "Deum de Deo" (God from God) and "Filioque" (and from the Son), phrases absent in the original text, was previously the only form used for the "profession of faith". The Roman Missal now refers to it jointly with the Apostles' Creed as "the Symbol or Profession of Faith or Creed", describing the second as "the baptismal Symbol of the Roman Church, known as the Apostles' Creed".

== Ancient liturgical versions ==
There are several designations for the two forms of the Nicene Creed, some with overlapping meanings:

- Nicene Creed or the Creed of Nicaea is used to refer to the original version adopted at the First Council of Nicaea (325), to the revised version adopted by the First Council of Constantinople (381), to the Latin version that includes the phrase "Deum de Deo" and "Filioque", and to the Armenian version, which does not include "and from the Son", but does include "God from God" and many other phrases.
- Niceno-Constantinopolitan Creed can stand for the revised version of Constantinople (381) or the later Latin version or various other versions.
- Icon/Symbol of the Faith is the usual designation for the revised version of Constantinople 381 in the Orthodox churches, where this is the only creed used in the liturgy.
- Profession of Faith of the 318 Fathers refers specifically to the version of Nicaea 325 (traditionally, 318 bishops took part at the First Council of Nicaea).
- Profession of Faith of the 150 Fathers refers specifically to the version of Constantinople 381 (traditionally, 150 bishops took part at the First Council of Constantinople).

This section is not intended to collect the texts of all liturgical versions of the Nicene Creed, but rather provides only three of special interest: the Greek, the Latin, and the Armenian. Others are mentioned separately, but without the texts. All ancient liturgical versions, even the Greek, differ to some extent, however small, from the text adopted by the First Councils of Nicaea and Constantinople. The Creed was originally written in Greek, owing to the location of the two councils.

Although the councils' texts have "Πιστεύομεν [...] ὁμολογοῦμεν [...] προσδοκοῦμεν" ("we believe [...] confess [...] await"), the creed that the Churches of Byzantine tradition use in their liturgy has "Πιστεύω [...] ὁμολογῶ [...] προσδοκῶ" ("I believe [...] confess [...] await"), accentuating the personal nature of recitation of the creed. The Latin text, as well as using the singular, has two additions: "Deum de Deo" (God from God) and "Filioque" (and from the Son). The Armenian text has many more additions, and is included as showing how that ancient church has chosen to recite the creed with these numerous elaborations of its contents.

An English translation of the Armenian text is provided; English translations of the Greek and Latin liturgical texts are included in English versions of the Nicene Creed in current use.

=== Greek liturgical text ===
Πιστεύω εἰς ἕνα Θεόν, Πατέρα, Παντοκράτορα, ποιητὴν οὐρανοῦ καὶ γῆς, ὁρατῶν τε πάντων καὶ ἀοράτων.
Καὶ εἰς ἕνα Κύριον Ἰησοῦν Χριστόν, τὸν Υἱὸν τοῦ Θεοῦ τὸν μονογενῆ, τὸν ἐκ τοῦ Πατρὸς γεννηθέντα πρὸ πάντων τῶν αἰώνων·
φῶς ἐκ φωτός, Θεὸν ἀληθινὸν ἐκ Θεοῦ ἀληθινοῦ, γεννηθέντα οὐ ποιηθέντα, ὁμοούσιον τῷ Πατρί, δι' οὗ τὰ πάντα ἐγένετο.
Τὸν δι' ἡμᾶς τοὺς ἀνθρώπους καὶ διὰ τὴν ἡμετέραν σωτηρίαν κατελθόντα ἐκ τῶν οὐρανῶν καὶ σαρκωθέντα
ἐκ Πνεύματος Ἁγίου καὶ Μαρίας τῆς Παρθένου καὶ ἐνανθρωπήσαντα.
Σταυρωθέντα τε ὑπὲρ ἡμῶν ἐπὶ Ποντίου Πιλάτου, καὶ παθόντα καὶ ταφέντα.
Καὶ ἀναστάντα τῇ τρίτῃ ἡμέρᾳ κατὰ τὰς Γραφάς.
Καὶ ἀνελθόντα εἰς τοὺς οὐρανοὺς καὶ καθεζόμενον ἐκ δεξιῶν τοῦ Πατρός.
Καὶ πάλιν ἐρχόμενον μετὰ δόξης κρῖναι ζῶντας καὶ νεκρούς, οὗ τῆς βασιλείας οὐκ ἔσται τέλος.
Καὶ εἰς τὸ Πνεῦμα τὸ Ἅγιον, τὸ κύριον, τὸ ζῳοποιόν,
τὸ ἐκ τοῦ Πατρὸς ἐκπορευόμενον,
τὸ σὺν Πατρὶ καὶ Υἱῷ συμπροσκυνούμενον καὶ συνδοξαζόμενον,
τὸ λαλῆσαν διὰ τῶν προφητῶν.
Εἰς μίαν, Ἁγίαν, Καθολικὴν καὶ Ἀποστολικὴν Ἐκκλησίαν.
Ὁμολογῶ ἓν βάπτισμα εἰς ἄφεσιν ἁμαρτιῶν.
Προσδοκῶ ἀνάστασιν νεκρῶν.
Καὶ ζωὴν τοῦ μέλλοντος αἰῶνος.
Ἀμήν.

=== Latin liturgical version ===
Credo in unum Deum,
Patrem omnipoténtem,
factórem cæli et terræ,
visibílium ómnium et invisibílium.
Et in unum Dóminum, Jesum Christum,
Fílium Dei unigénitum,
et ex Patre natum ante ómnia sǽcula.
Deum de Deo, lumen de lúmine, Deum verum de Deo vero,
génitum, non factum, consubstantiálem Patri:
per quem ómnia facta sunt.
Qui propter nos hómines et propter nostram salútem
descéndit de caelis.
Et incarnátus est de Spíritu Sancto
ex María vírgine, et homo factus est.
Crucifíxus étiam pro nobis sub Póntio Piláto;
passus et sepúltus est,
et resurréxit tértia die, secúndum Scriptúras,
et ascéndit in coelum, sedet ad déxteram Patris.
Et íterum ventúrus est cum glória,
judicáre vivos et mórtuos,
cujus regni non erit finis.
Et in Spíritum Sanctum, Dóminum et vivificántem:
qui ex Patre Filióque procédit.
Qui cum Patre et Fílio simul adorátur et conglorificátur:
qui locútus est per prophétas.
Et unam, sanctam, cathólicam et apostólicam Ecclésiam.
Confíteor unum baptísma in remissiónem peccatórum.
Et exspécto resurrectiónem mortuórum,
et vitam ventúri sǽculi. Amen.

The Latin text adds "Deum de Deo" and "Filioque" to the Greek. For further information, see The Filioque Controversy above. Inevitably also, the overtones of the terms used, such as a παντοκράτορα, pantokratora and omnipotentem, differ (pantokratora meaning ruler of all; omnipotentem meaning omnipotent, almighty). The implications of the difference in overtones of "ἐκπορευόμενον" and "qui [...] procedit" was the object of the study The Greek and the Latin Traditions regarding the Procession of the Holy Spirit published by the Pontifical Council for Promoting Christian Unity in 1996.

Again, the terms ὁμοούσιον and consubstantialem, translated as "of one being" or "consubstantial", have different overtones, being based respectively on Greek οὐσία (stable being, immutable reality, substance, essence, true nature), and Latin substantia (that of which a thing consists, the being, essence, contents, material, substance).

"Credo", which in classical Latin is used with the accusative case of the thing held to be true (and with the dative of the person to whom credence is given), is here used three times with the preposition "in", a literal translation of the Greek εἰς (in unum Deum [...], in unum Dominum [...], in Spiritum Sanctum [...]), and once in the classical preposition-less construction (unam, sanctam, catholicam et apostolicam Ecclesiam).

=== Armenian liturgical text ===
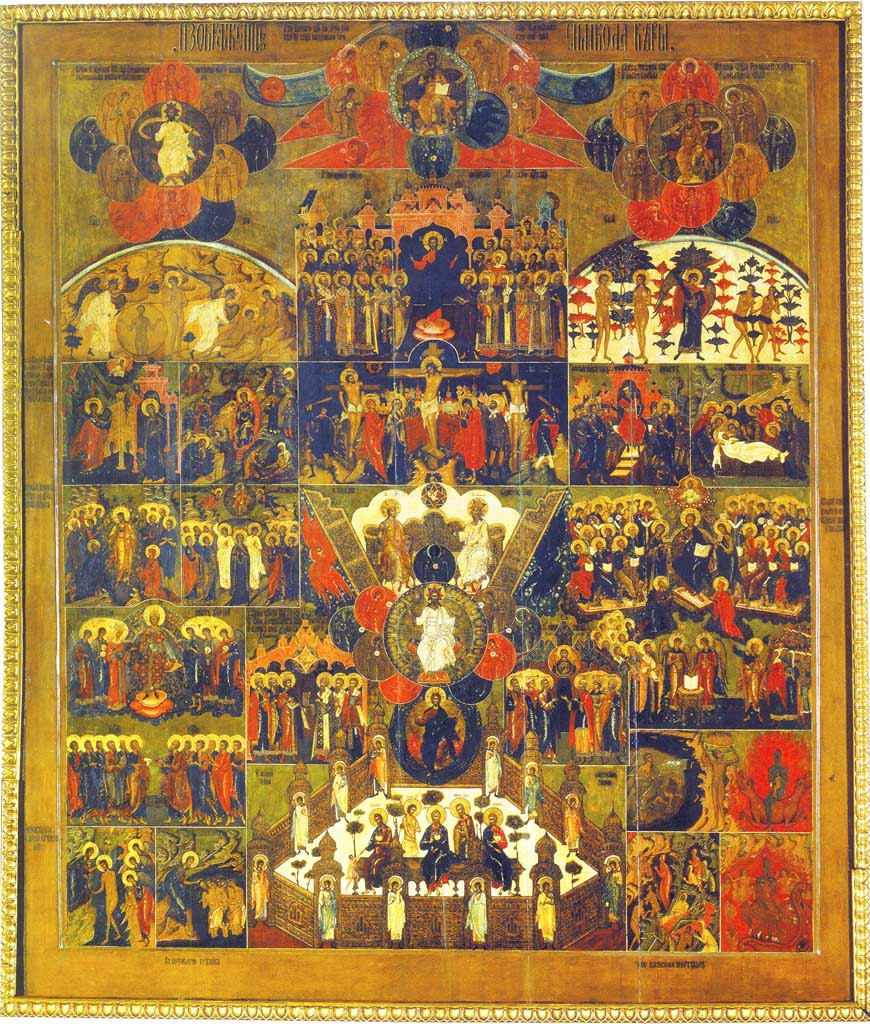
17th-century Russian icon illustrating the articles of the creed

Հաւատամք ի մի Աստուած, ի Հայրն ամենակալ, յարարիչն երկնի եւ երկրի, երեւելեաց եւ աներեւութից։
Եւ ի մի Տէր Յիսուս Քրիստոս, յՈրդին Աստուծոյ, ծնեալն յԱստուծոյ Հօրէ, միածին՝ այսինքն յէութենէ Հօր։
Աստուած յԱստուծոյ, լոյս ի լուսոյ, Աստուած ճշմարիտ յԱստուծոյ ճշմարտէ, ծնունդ եւ ոչ արարած։ Նոյն ինքն ի բնութենէ Հօր, որով ամենայն ինչ եղեւ յերկինս եւ ի վերայ երկրի, երեւելիք եւ աներեւոյթք։
Որ յաղագս մեր մարդկան եւ վասն մերոյ փրկութեան իջեալ ի յերկնից՝ մարմնացաւ, մարդացաւ, ծնաւ կատարելապէս ի Մարիամայ սրբոյ կուսէն Հոգւովն Սրբով։
Որով էառ զմարմին, զհոգի եւ զմիտ, եւ զամենայն որ ինչ է ի մարդ, ճշմարտապէս եւ ոչ կարծեօք։
Չարչարեալ, խաչեալ, թաղեալ, յերրորդ աւուր յարուցեալ, ելեալ ի յերկինս նովին մարմնովն, նստաւ ընդ աջմէ Հօր։
Գալոց է նովին մարմնովն եւ փառօք Հօր ի դատել զկենդանիս եւ զմեռեալս, որոյ թագաւորութեանն ոչ գոյ վախճան։
Հաւատամք եւ ի սուրբ Հոգին, յանեղն եւ ի կատարեալն․ Որ խօսեցաւ յօրէնս եւ ի մարգարէս եւ յաւետարանս․ Որ էջն ի Յորդանան, քարոզեաց զառաքեալսն, եւ բնակեցաւ ի սուրբսն։
Հաւատամք եւ ի մի միայն, ընդհանրական եւ առաքելական, Սուրբ Եկեղեցի․ ի մի մկրտութիւն, յապաշխարհութիւն, ի քաւութիւն եւ ի թողութիւն մեղաց․ ի յարութիւնն մեռելոց․ ի դատաստանն յաւիտենից հոգւոց եւ մարմնոց․ յարքայութիւնն երկնից, եւ ի կեանսն յաւիտենականս։

==== English translation of the Armenian version ====
We believe in one God, the Father Almighty, the maker of heaven and earth, of things visible and invisible.
And in one Lord Jesus Christ, the Son of God, the begotten of God the Father, the Only-begotten, that is of the substance of the Father.
God of God, Light of Light, true God of true God, begotten and not made; of the very same nature of the Father; by Whom all things came into being, in heaven and on earth, visible and invisible.
Who for us humanity and for our salvation came down from heaven, was incarnate, became human, was born perfectly of the holy virgin Mary by the Holy Spirit.
By whom He took body, soul, and mind, and everything that is in man, truly and not in semblance.
He suffered, was crucified, was buried, rose again on the third day, ascended into heaven with the same body, [and] sat at the right hand of the Father.
He is to come with the same body and with the glory of the Father, to judge the living and the dead; of His kingdom there is no end.
We believe in the Holy Spirit, the uncreate and the perfect; Who spoke through the Law, the prophets, and the Gospels; Who came down upon the Jordan, preached through the apostles, and lived in the saints.
We believe also in only One, Universal, Apostolic, and [Holy] Church; in one baptism with repentance for the remission and forgiveness of sins; and in the resurrection of the dead, in the everlasting judgement of souls and bodies, in the Kingdom of Heaven and in the everlasting life.

=== Other ancient liturgical versions ===
The version in the Church Slavonic language, used by several Eastern Orthodox churches is practically identical with the Greek liturgical version.

This version is also used by some Byzantine Rite Eastern Catholic Churches. Although the Union of Brest excluded addition of the Filioque, this was sometimes added by Ruthenian Catholics, whose older liturgical books also show the phrase in brackets, and by Ukrainian Catholics. Writing in 1971, the Ruthenian scholar Casimir Kucharek noted, "In Eastern Catholic Churches, the Filioque may be omitted except when scandal would ensue. Most of the Eastern Catholic Rites use it." However, in the decades that followed 1971, it has come to be used more rarely.

The versions used by Oriental Orthodoxy and the Church of the East may differ from the Greek liturgical version in having "We believe", as in the original text, instead of "I believe".

== Indulgence ==
In the Catholic Church, to obtain the plenary indulgence once a day, it is necessary to visit a church or oratory to which the indulgence is attached and the recitation of the Sunday prayers, the Creed and the Hail Mary.

Recitation of the Apostles' Creed or the Nicene-Constantinopolitan Creed is required to obtain a partial indulgence.

== English translations ==
The version found in the 1662 Book of Common Prayer is still commonly used by some English speakers, but more modern translations are now more common. The International Consultation on English Texts (later known as English Language Liturgical Consultation (ELLC)) published an English translation of the Nicene Creed, first in 1970 and then in successive revisions in 1971 and 1975. Several churches adopted these texts.

The Catholic Church in the United States adopted the 1971 version in 1973. The Catholic Church in other English-speaking countries adopted the 1975 version in 1975. They continued to use them until 2011, when they were replaced with the version in the Roman Missal third edition. The 1975 version was included in the 1979 Episcopal Church (United States) Book of Common Prayer, but in the line "For us men and for our salvation", it omitted the word "men".

== See also ==
- Nicene Christianity
- Homoousion
- First seven ecumenical councils
- Mainline Protestant
- Papacy in late antiquity
- Apostles’ Creed

== Bibliography ==
- Ayres, Lewis (2006). Nicaea and Its Legacy. Oxford: Oxford University Press. ISBN 0-19-875505-8.
- Burn, A E (1925). The Council of Nicaea: a memorial for its sixteenth centenary. London: Society for Promoting Christian Knowledge.
- Forell, G (1965). Understanding the Nicene Creed. Philadelphia: Fortress Press.
- Kantorowicz, Ernst (1957). The King's Two Bodies. Princeton: Princeton University Press.
- Kelly, John N. D. (2006) [1972]. Early Christian Creeds (3rd ed.). London-New York: Continuum. ISBN 978-0-8264-9216-6.
- Morin, Germain (1911). "L'Origine du Symbole d'Athanase" [The Origin of the Symbol of Athanasius] (PDF). The Journal of Theological Studies (in French). 12 (2). Oxford: Oxford University Press: 337–59. doi:10.1093/jts/os-XII.3.337.
- Ritter, Adolf Martin (1965). Das Konzil von Konstantinopel und sein Symbol: Studien zur Geschichte und Theologie des II. Ökumenischen Konzils [The Council of Constantinople and its Symbol: Studies in the History and Theology of the Second Ecumenical Council] (in German). Göttingen: Vandenhoeck & Ruprecht. ISBN 978-3-666-55118-5.
- Kinzig, Wolfram (2021). Das Glaubensbekenntnis von Konstantinopel (381): Herkunft, Geltung und Rezeption. Neue Texte und Studien zu den antiken und frühmittelalterlichen Glaubensbekenntnissen II [The Creed of Constantinople (381): Origin, Validity and Reception. New Texts and Studies on the Ancient and Early Medieval Creeds II]. Arbeiten zur Kirchengeschichte 147 (in German). Berlin/Boston: De Gruyter. ISBN 978-3-11-071461-6.
