= Lectionary =

Book of approved scripture readings in Abrahamic religions

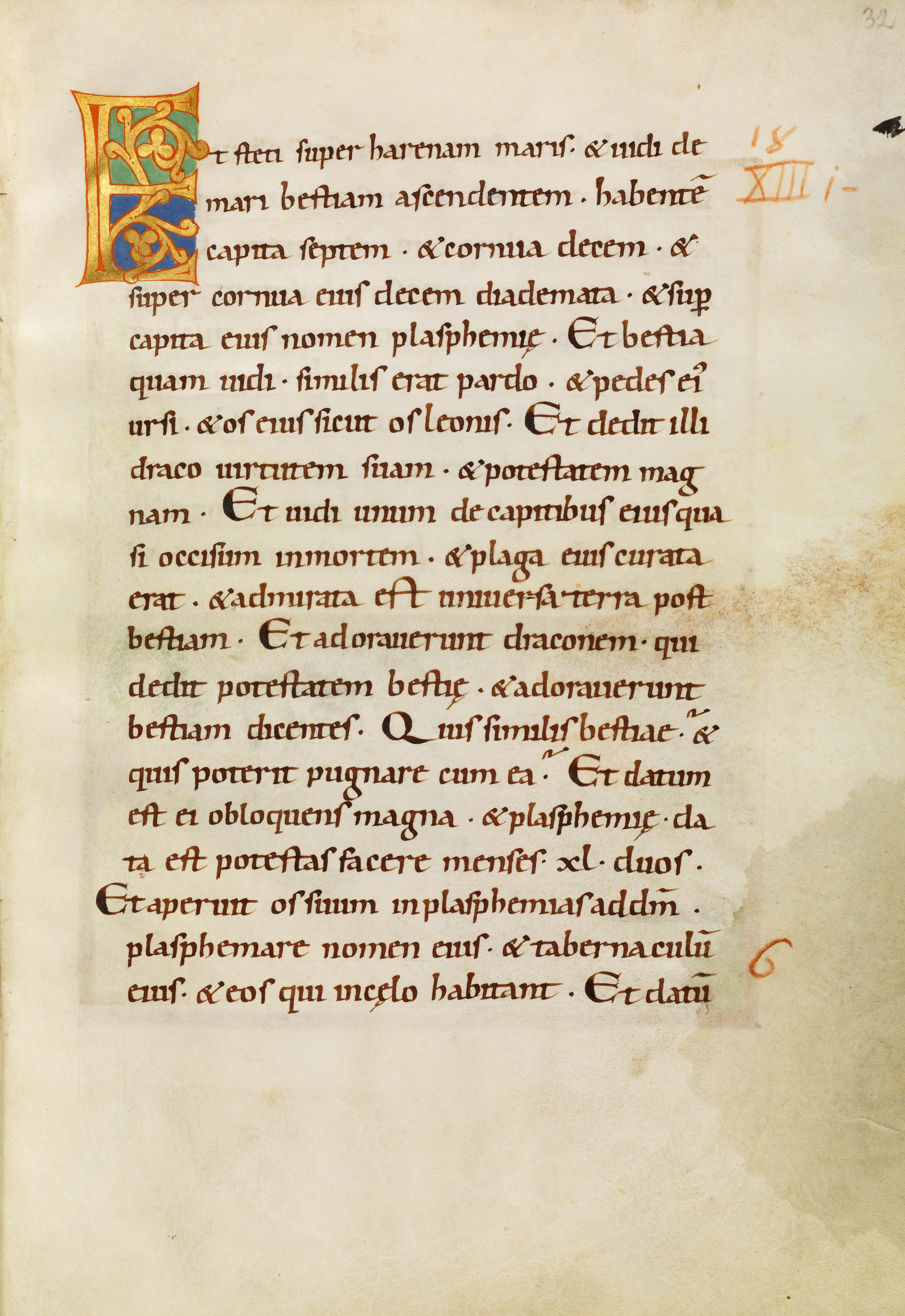
Page from the 11th-century "Bamberg Apocalypse", Gospel lectionary. (Bamberg State Library, Msc.Bibl.140).

A lectionary (Latin: lectionarium) is a book or listing that contains a collection of scripture readings appointed for Christian or Jewish worship on a given day or occasion. There are sub-types such as a "gospel lectionary" or evangeliary, and an epistolary with the readings from the Epistles of the New Testament.

== History ==
By the Medieval era the Jewish community had a standardized schedule of scripture readings from both the Torah and the prophets to be read in the synagogue. A sequential selection was read from the Torah, followed by the haftarah – a selection from the prophetic books or historical narratives (e.g. Judges, Kings, etc.) closely linked to the selection from the Torah. The early Christians adopted the Jewish custom of reading extracts from the Old Testament on the Sabbath. They soon added extracts from the writings of the Apostles and gospels.

Both Hebrew and Christian lectionaries developed over the centuries. Typically, a lectionary will go through the scriptures in a logical pattern, and also include selections which were chosen by the religious community for their appropriateness to particular occasions. The one-year Jewish lectionary reads the entirety of the Torah within the space of a year and may have begun in the Babylonian Jewish community; the three-year Jewish lectionary seems to trace its origin to the Jewish community in and around the Holy Land.

Within Christianity, the use of pre-assigned, scheduled readings from the scriptures can be traced back to the early church, and seems to have developed out of the practices of the Second Temple period. The earliest documentary record of a special book of readings is a reference by Gennadius of Massilia to a work produced by Musaeus of Marseilles at the request of Bishop Venerius of Marseille, who died in 452, though there are 3rd-century references to liturgical readers as a special role in the clergy.

== Western lectionaries ==
=== Latin liturgical rites ===
==== Before the Second Vatican Council ====
Before the liturgical reforms of Vatican II, the Latin liturgical rite used a one-year lectionary consisting of a limited selection of sacred readings from the Scriptures. The reason for these limited selections was to maintain consistency, as was a true feature in the Roman Rite. There was one reading to be proclaimed before the Gospel, either taken from the Old Testament (referred to as Lesson) or from the letters of Saint Paul, Saint John, or Saint Peter (referred to as Epistle).

The Lesson (or Epistle) is contained in a book called the Epistolarium, a liturgical book containing the epistles that were to be said or sung by a subdeacon at a solemn High Mass. The Gospels are contained in a book called Evangeliarium, or more recently called as "Book of the Gospels", that were to be said or sung by a deacon at a solemn High Mass.

However, the Ambrosian Rite and the Mozarabic Rite have two readings to be proclaimed, called Prophetia and Epistola.

==== Catholic Mass Lectionary and the Revised Common Lectionary ====
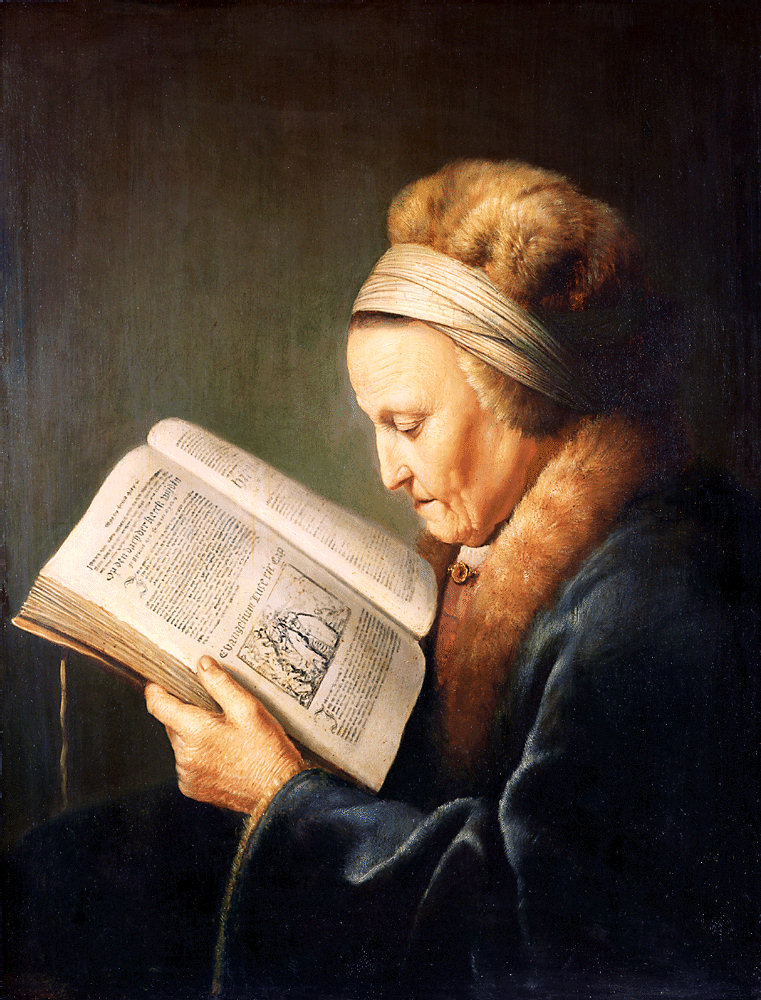
Portrait of Rembrandt's mother reading a lectionary, c. 1630 (Rijksmuseum, Amsterdam). The painting has more recently been attributed to Gerrit Dou.

After the Second Vatican Council of 1962–1965, the Holy See, promulgated the Ordo Lectionum Missae (Order of the Readings for Mass) in 1969, giving listings of the revised structure and the references to the passages chosen for inclusion in the new official lectionary of the Roman Rite of Mass. It introduced an arrangement of four passages, including one from the Psalms, to be used in Sunday masses, while three passages, also including one from a Psalm, are used for weekday Masses, consisting of:

- First reading (Prima lectio) from the Old Testament or, in Eastertide from certain books of the New Testament, on Sundays, or from a New Testament Epistles on weekdays
- Responsorial psalm (Psalmus responsorium) (ideally, to be sung, as contained in the Simple Gradual) or Gradual (as contained in the Roman Gradual)
- Second reading (Secunda lectio) from one of the Epistles is read only on Sundays and Solemnities
- Gospel reading (Evangelium)

These were arranged so the readings on Sundays and principal feasts recur in a three-year cycle, (Note: The Council's Constitution on the Sacred Liturgy referred to "a prescribed number of years".) Weekday readings consist of an epistle reading, which are read continuously over a two-year cycle, and a Gospel reading, which are read continuously over the course of the year so they repeat annually.

This revised Mass Lectionary, covering much more of the Bible than the readings in the Tridentine Roman Missal, which recurred after a single year, has been translated into the many languages in which the Roman Rite Mass is now celebrated, incorporating existing or specially prepared translations of the Bible and with readings for national celebrations added either as an appendix or, in some cases, incorporated into the main part of the lectionary.

The Latin Catholic lectionary as revised after Vatican II is the basis for many Protestant lectionaries, most notably the Revised Common Lectionary (RCL) and its derivatives, as organized by the Consultation on Common Texts (CCT) organization located in Nashville, Tennessee. Like the Roman lectionary, they generally organize the readings for worship services on Sundays in a three-year cycle, with four elements on each Sunday, and three elements during weekday services.

===== Three-year Sunday cycle =====
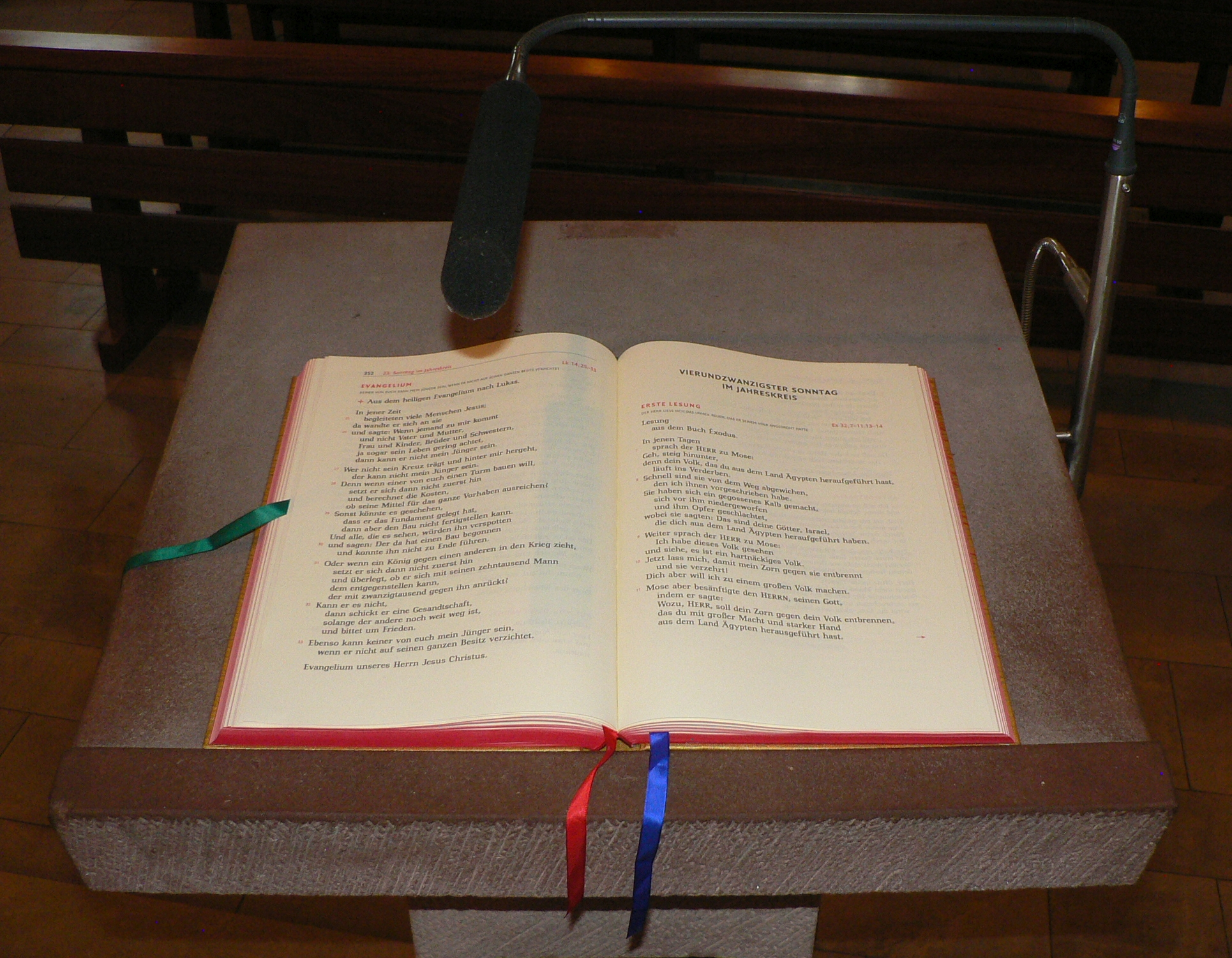
A German Catholic lectionary for Year C on an ambo

The lectionaries (both Catholic and RCL versions) are organized into three-year cycles of readings. The years are designated A, B, or C. Each yearly cycle begins on the first Sunday of Advent (the Sunday between 27 November and 3 December inclusive).

- Year A: Gospel of Matthew (Advent 2025 through 2026 – current year)
- Year B: Gospel of Mark (Advent 2026 through 2027)
- Year C: Gospel of Luke (Advent 2027 through 2028)

The Gospel of John is read throughout the Easter season, and is used for other liturgical seasons including Advent, Christmas, and Lent where appropriate. In Year B, chapter 6 of the Gospel of John is read on the 17th to the 21st Sundays of Ordinary Time (ninth to thirteenth Sundays after Trinity), during July and August, as the Gospel of Mark is the shortest Gospel.

===== Daily lectionaries =====
The Roman Catholic lectionary includes a two-year cycle for the weekday mass readings (called Cycle I and Cycle II). Odd-numbered years are Cycle I; even-numbered ones are Cycle II. The weekday lectionary includes a reading from the Old Testament, Acts, Revelation, or the Epistles; a responsorial Psalm; and a reading from one of the gospels. These readings are generally shorter than those appointed for use on Sundays. The pericopes for the first reading along with the psalms are arranged in a two-year cycle. The gospels are arranged so that portions of all four are read every year. This weekday lectionary has also been adapted by some denominations with congregations that celebrate daily Eucharistic services. It has been published in the Episcopal Church's Lesser Feasts and Fasts and in the Anglican Church of Canada's Book of Alternative Services (among others).

This eucharistic lectionary is distinct the various Daily Office lectionaries in use in various denominations. The Consultation on Common Texts has produced a three-year Daily Lectionary which is thematically tied into the Revised Common Lectionary, but the RCL does not provide a daily Eucharistic lectionary as such. Various Anglican and Lutheran churches have their own daily lectionaries. Many of the Anglican daily lectionaries are adapted from the one provided in the 1979 Book of Common Prayer.

==== Other lectionary information ====
In some churches, the lectionary is carried in the entrance procession by a lector. In the Catholic Church, the Book of the Gospels is carried in by a deacon (when there is no deacon, a lector might process in with the Book of the Gospels). When the Book of the Gospels is used, the first two readings are read from the lectionary, while the Book of the Gospels is used for the final reading.

The lectionary is separate from a missal, gradual, or sacramentary. While the lectionary contains scripture readings, the missal or sacramentary contains the appropriate prayers for the service, and the gradual contains chants for use on any particular day. In particular, the gradual contains a responsory which may be used in place of the responsorial psalm.

=== Anglican lectionaries ===
The traditional one-year Anglican lectionary, used in the ante-communion, largely follows the pre-Reformation practice with a few alterations. With few exceptions, it includes one reading from the epistles and one from the Gospels for every Sunday and holiday throughout the year. Present day Church of England Common Worship Lectionaries were derived from the Revised Common Lectionary and published between 2000 and 2010. The traditional readings for Morning and Evening Prayer include a chapter from both the Old and New Testament everyday, as well as a selection from the Psalms. With this system, most of the Old Testament is read through once a year (with selections from the Apocrypha filling in the gap between September and the beginning of Advent), the New Testament (with the exception of Revelation) is read through three times a year, and the Psalms are read through once every month.

== Eastern lectionaries ==
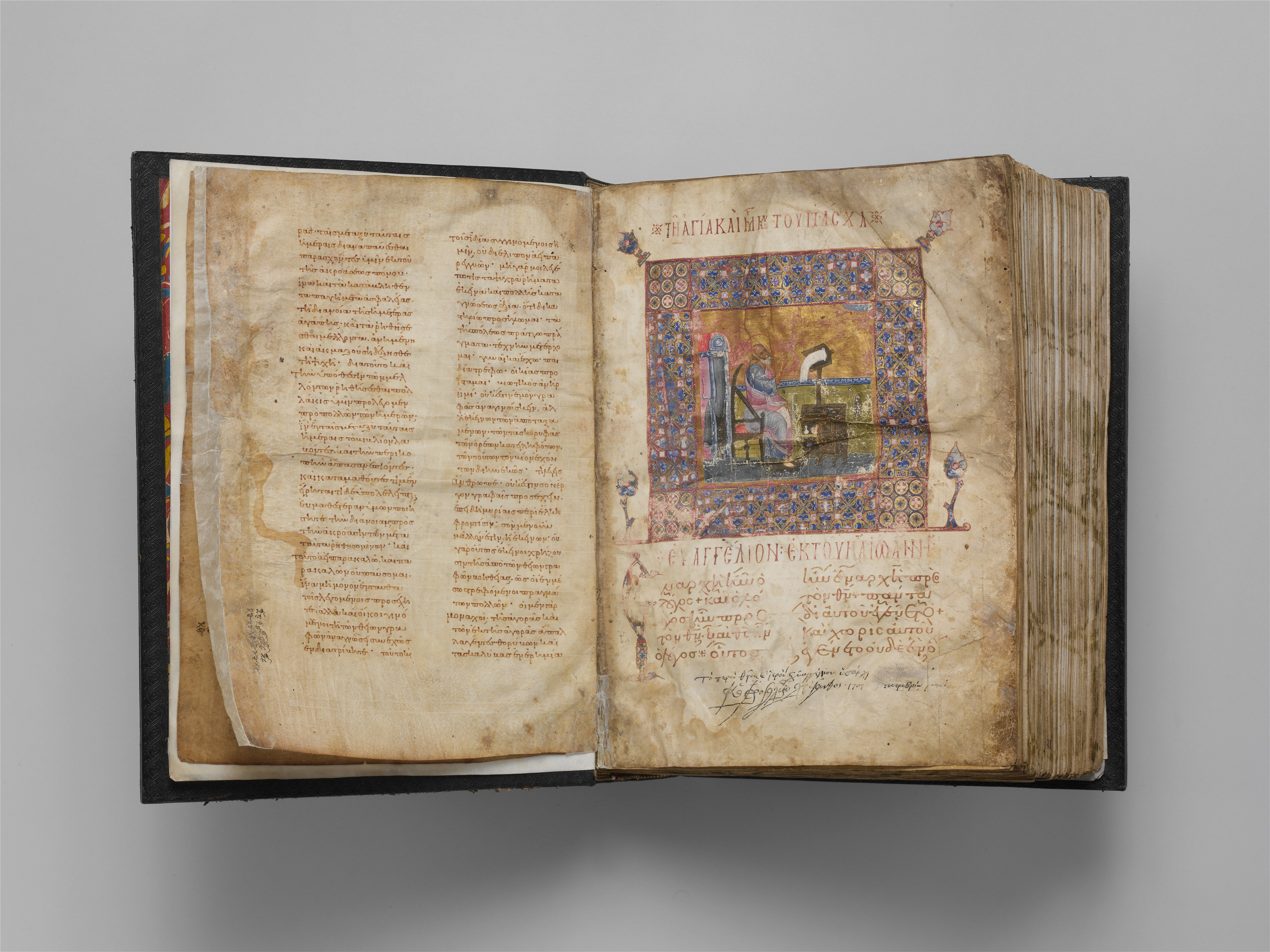
Jaharis Byzantine Lectionary, Metropolitan Museum of Art

In the Eastern Churches (Eastern Orthodox, Oriental Orthodox, Eastern Catholic, the Assyrian Church of the East, Ancient Church of the East, and those bodies not in communion with any of them but still practicing Eastern liturgical customs) tend to retain the use of a one-year lectionary in their liturgy. Different churches follow different liturgical calendars (to an extent). Most Eastern lectionaries provide for an epistle and a Gospel to be read on each day. Other known witnesses of the Christian Jerusalem-Rite Lectionary are those preserved in Georgian, Caucasian Albanian language, and Armenian translations (6th to 8th centuries CE).

=== Byzantine lectionary ===
Those churches (Eastern Orthodox and Byzantine Catholic) which follow the Rite of Constantinople, provide an epistle and Gospel reading for most days of the year, to be read at the Divine Liturgy; however, during Great Lent there is no celebration of the liturgy on weekdays (Monday through Friday), so no epistle and Gospel are appointed for those days. As a historical note, the Greek lectionaries are a primary source for the Byzantine text-type used in the scholarly field of textual criticism.

==== Epistle and Gospel ====
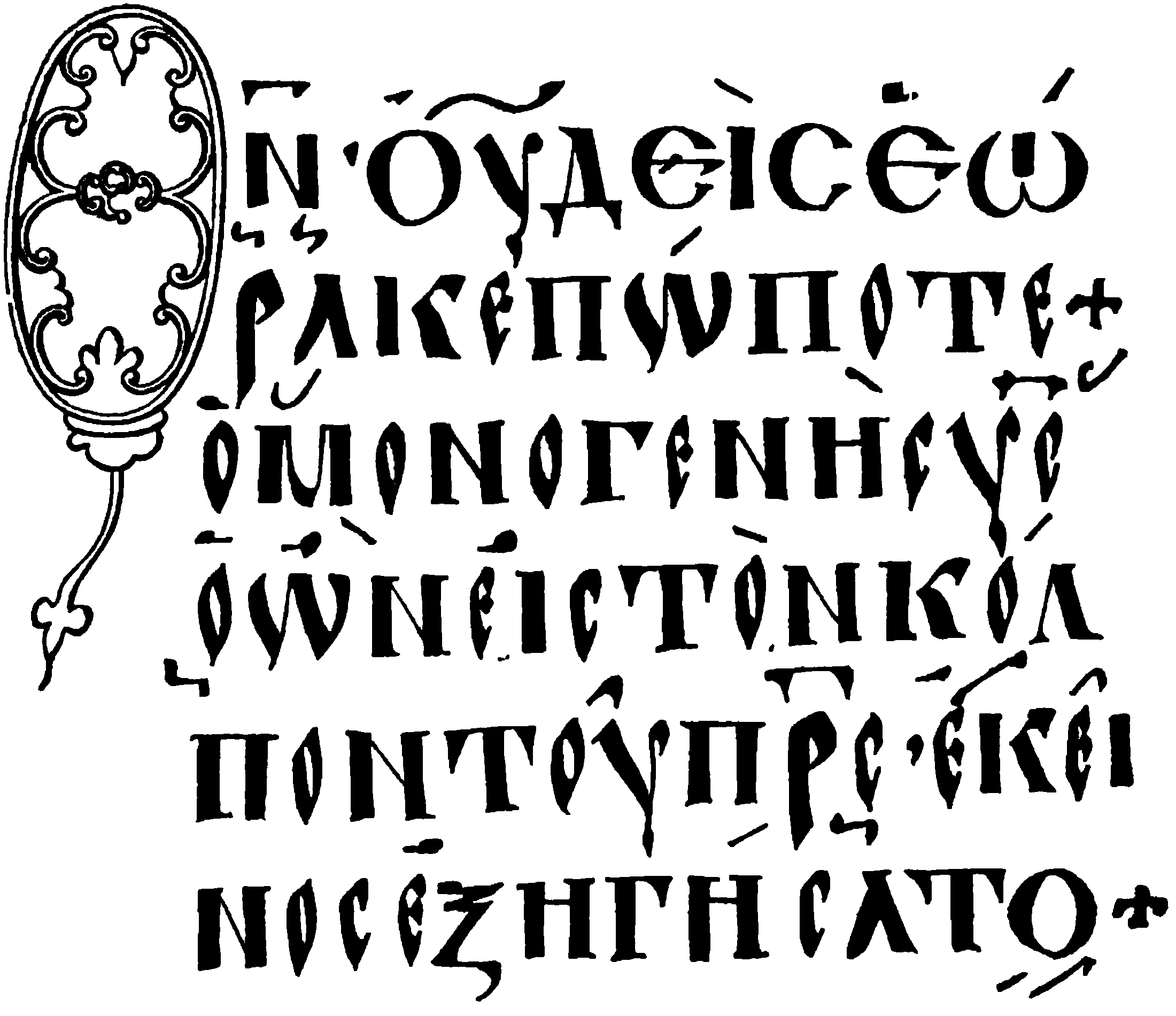
An example of Byzantine lectionary — Codex Harleianus (l^{150}), AD 995, text of John 1:18

The Gospel readings are found in what Orthodoxy usually calls a Gospel Book (Evangélion), although in strict English terms the Greek ones are in the form of an Evangeliary, and an Epistle Book (Apostól). There are differences in the precise arrangement of these books between the various national churches. In the Byzantine practice, the readings are in the form of pericopes (selections from scripture containing only the portion actually chanted during the service), and are arranged according to the order in which they occur in the church year, beginning with the Sunday of Pascha (Easter), and continuing throughout the entire year, concluding with Holy Week. Then follows a section of readings for the commemorations of saints and readings for special occasions (baptisms, funerals, etc.). In the Slavic practice, the biblical books are reproduced in their entirety and arranged in the canonical order in which they appear in the Bible.

The annual cycle of the Gospels is composed of four series:

1. The Gospel of St. John
  read from Pascha until Pentecost Sunday
2. The Gospel of St. Matthew
  divided over seventeen weeks beginning with the Monday of the Holy Spirit (the day after Pentecost). From the twelfth week, it is read on Saturdays and Sundays while the Gospel of St. Mark is read on the remaining weekdays
3. The Gospel of St. Luke
  divided over nineteen weeks beginning on the Monday after the Sunday after the Elevation of the Holy Cross. From the thirteenth week, it is only read on Saturdays and Sundays, while St. Mark's Gospel is read on the remaining weekdays
4. The Gospel of St. Mark
  read during the Lenten period on Saturdays and Sundays — with the exception of the Sunday of Orthodoxy.

The interruption of the reading of the Gospel of Matthew after the Elevation of the Holy Cross is known as the "Lukan Jump". The jump occurs only in the Gospel readings, there is no corresponding jump in the epistles. From this point on the epistle and Gospel readings do not exactly correspond, the epistles continuing to be determined according to the moveable Paschal cycle and the Gospels being influenced by the fixed cycle.

The Lukan Jump is related to the chronological proximity of the Elevation of the Cross to the Conception of the Forerunner (St. John the Baptist), celebrated on 23 September. In late Antiquity, this feast marked the beginning of the ecclesiastical New Year. Thus, beginning the reading of the Lukan Gospel toward the middle of September can be understood. The reasoning is theological and is based on a vision of Salvation History: the Conception of the Forerunner constitutes the first step of the New Economy, as mentioned in the stikhera of the matins of this feast. The Evangelist Luke is the only one to mention this Conception (Luke 1:5–24).

In Russia, the use of the Lukan Jump vanished; however, in recent decades, the Russian Church has begun the process of returning to the use of the Lukan Jump.

Similarly to the Gospel Cycle, Epistle readings follow this plan although some exceptions vary:

1. Book of the Acts of the Apostles
  read from Pascha until Pentecost Sunday
2. Letter to the Romans, 1 Corinthians and 2 Corinthians
  From Pentecost to Elevation of the Holy Cross
3. Galatians, Ephesians, Philippians, Colossians, 1 Thessalonians, 2 Thessalonians, 1 Timothy, 2 Timothy, Hebrews
  From Elevation of the Holy Cross to the Circumcision of Christ, 1 January
4. James, Hebrews, 1 Peter and 2 Peter
  read from the Circumcision of Christ to the Clean Monday, first weekday of Great Lent.

==== Old Testament readings ====
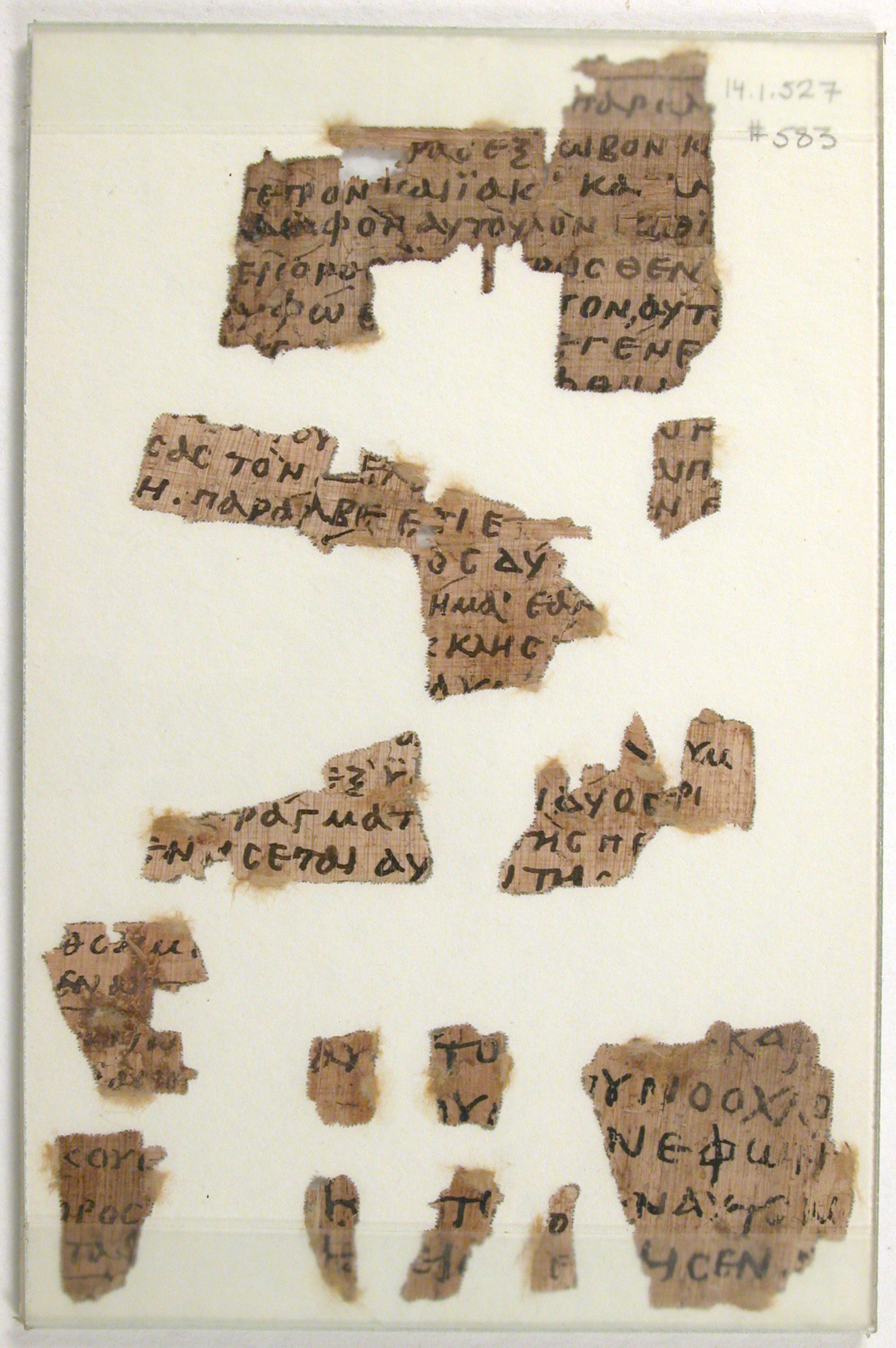
A portion of a Coptic lectionary

Other services have scriptural readings also. There is a Gospel lesson at Matins on Sundays and feast days. These are found in the Evangelion. There are also readings from the Old Testament, called "parables" (paroemia), which are read at vespers on feast days. These parables are found in the Menaion, Triodion or Pentecostarion. During Great Lent, parables are read every day at vespers and at the Sixth Hour. These parables are found in the Triodion.

=== Syriac and Malankara churches: Catholic, Orthodox ===
In the Jacobite Syriac Churches, the lectionary begins with the liturgical calendar year on Qudosh `Idto (the Sanctification of the Church), which falls on the eighth Sunday before Christmas. Both the Old and the New Testament books are read except the books of Revelation, Song of Solomon, and I and II Maccabees. Scripture readings are assigned for Sundays and feast days, for each day of Lent and Holy Week, for raising people to various offices of the Church, for the blessing of Holy Oil and various services such as baptisms and funerals.

Generally, three Old Testament lections, a selection from the prophets, and three readings from the New Testament are prescribed for each Sunday and Feast day. The New Testament readings include a reading from Acts, another from the Catholic Epistles or the Pauline Epistles, and a third reading from one of the Gospels. During Christmas and Easter a fourth lesson is added for the evening service. The readings reach a climax with the approach of the week of the Crucifixion. Through Lent lessons are recited twice a day except Saturdays. During the Passion Week readings are assigned for each of the major canonical hours.

If there is a weekday Liturgy celebrated on a non-feast day, the custom is to read the Pauline epistle only, followed by the Gospel.

== See also ==
- Book of Alternative Services
- Dominical letter
- Ekphonetic notation
- Gospel Book
- Lection
- Lector
- List of New Testament lectionaries
- Liturgical year
- Manzil
- Mass (liturgy)
- Pericope
- Revised Common Lectionary
- The Text This Week
- Weekly Torah portion
- The Syro-Aramaic Reading of the Koran
