= The quick and the dead =

English phrase

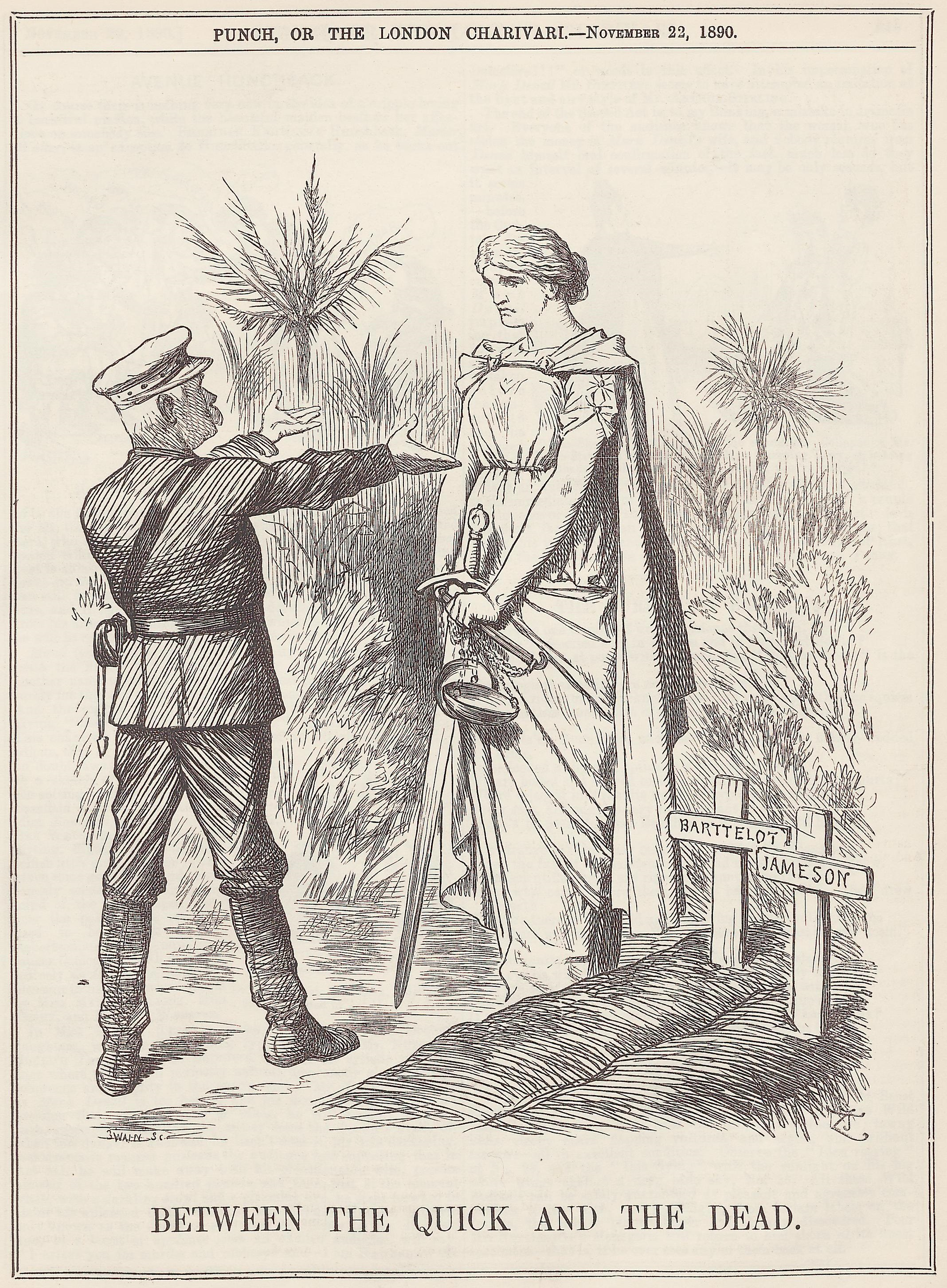
The cartoon "Between the Quick and the Dead" (Punch magazine, 22 November 1890) depicts a British officer imploring the figure of Justice beside the graves of the army officer Edmund Musgrave Barttelot and the naturalist James Sligo Jameson, over their roles in the Emin Pasha Relief Expedition.

The quick and the dead is an English phrase used in the paraphrase of the Creed in the Medieval Lay Folks Mass Book and is found in William Tyndale's English translation of the New Testament (1526), "I testifie therfore before god and before the lorde Iesu Christ which shall iudge quicke and deed at his aperynge in his kyngdom" (2 Timothy 4:1), and used by Thomas Cranmer in his translation of the Nicene Creed and Apostles' Creed for the first Book of Common Prayer in 1549. In the following century the idiom was used both by Shakespeare's Hamlet (1603) and the King James Bible (1611). More recently the final verse of The Book of Mormon (1830), mentions "...the Eternal Judge of both quick and dead".

The phrase has been used both in its original sense in the titles of books and films, and sometimes ambiguously with the modern sense of the word "quick" for tales of speed and deadly danger.

== Etymology ==
The use of the word quick in this context is an archaic one, specifically meaning living or alive; therefore, this idiom concerns 'the living and the dead'. The meaning of "quick" in this way is still retained in various common phrases, such as the "quick" of the fingernails, and in the idiom quickening, as the moment in pregnancy when fetal movements are first felt.) Another common phrase, "cut to the quick", literally means cut through the dead, unfeeling layers of the skin to the living, sensitive tissues below. It is derived from the Proto-Germanic *kwikwaz, which in turn was from a variant of the Proto-Indo-European form *g^{w}ih_{3}wos – "lively, alive", from the root *g^{w}eih_{3} – "(to) live" (from which also comes the Latin vivere and later the Italian and Spanish viva, and whose root is retained in the English words revive and survive). The English meaning of "quick" in later centuries shifted to "fast", "rapid", "moving, or able to move, with speed". The old sense of the word as "alive" survives in "quicksand" (which moves), "quicklime" (which seethes and bubbles), and "quicksilver", an old name for the liquid metal mercury, which runs around and quivers as if alive.

== Primary religious origins ==
=== In the King James Bible ===
The phrase is found in three passages in the 1611 King James Bible: in the Acts of the Apostles (Acts 10:42), Paul's letters to Timothy (2 Timothy 4:1), and the First Epistle of Peter. The last reads: "For the time past of our life may suffice us to have wrought the will of the Gentiles, when we walked in lasciviousness, lusts, excess of wine, revellings, banquetings, and abominable idolatries: Wherein they think it strange that ye run not with them to the same excess of riot, speaking evil of you: Who shall give account to him that is ready to judge the quick and the dead".

=== In the Nicene and Apostles' Creeds ===
In the Nicene Creed the phrase appears in the following passage (taken from the 1662 Book of Common Prayer):

[He] ascended into heaven,
And sitteth on the right hand of the Father.
And he shall come again with glory to judge both the quick and the dead.

In the Apostles' Creed the phrase appears in the following passage (also from the 1662 Book of Common Prayer):

He ascended into heaven,
And sitteth on the right hand of God the Father Almighty;
From thence he shall come to judge the quick and the dead.

== Other uses ==
=== Shakespeare's Hamlet ===
This phrase occurs in Shakespeare's tragedy Hamlet, when Ophelia's brother, Laertes, at the burial of his sister, Ophelia, asks the gravedigger to hold off throwing earth onto Ophelia's body and jumps into her grave and says, "Now pile your dust upon the quick and the dead . . . " (line 5.1.240). Laertes is "quick" (i.e., alive), and Ophelia is dead. The scene dramatizes the extreme passion of Laertes. A play on the expression comes earlier in the same scene, when Hamlet asks a gravedigger whose grave is being dug, and the gravedigger, designated as CLOWN, uses a pun on the word, "lie," and playfully evades Hamlet's question. Hamlet's reply includes the line, "'tis for the dead, not for the quick . . ." (line 5.1.118).

=== In fiction ===
Several books and films have been made using the idiom as their title. The books include a 1943 work by Ellery Queen, a 1956 book by Bill Waterton, a 1973 novel by Louis L'Amour involving a gunfight and a tale of revenge, a 1991 book by George Grant, and a 2002 novel by Joy Williams. Robert Heinlein's 1940 short story "The Roads Must Roll" tells that "It was not physically possible to drive safely in those crowded metropolises. Pedestrians were sardonically divided into two classes, the quick, and the dead."

The films include a 1963 war film by Robert Totten, a 1978 documentary about the deadly danger of motor racing, where 'quick' is taken in both the modern and the original sense, and a 1987 television film by Robert Day based on L'Amour's novel. Sam Raimi's 1995 film The Quick and the Dead tells the story of a female gunfighter who rides into a frontier town and joins a deadly duelling competition to seek revenge for her father's death; here, 'quick' means both "quick on the draw" and "alive".

In 2022, under the same title, the British fine-art photographer David Yarrow made a photograph on the theme of the gun-toting visitor to a Wild West town, using a cast of 120 people "near the Crazy Mountain at the old Marlboro Ranch in Montana".

=== In literary analysis ===
Joan Douglas Peters, analysing the novelist D. H. Lawrence's theory of literary genres, notes that he defines genres as either "quick" or "dead", and that he uses the "quick and the dead" opposition not metaphorically but "as simple, literal description". That is despite his metaphorical definition of "quick" as "the God-flame in everything". In her view, Lawrence finds no contradiction between "the use of metaphor and the expression of literal truth." Peters comments that Lawrence satirizes the religious phrase, but makes use of it all the same, as if to try to prove that "categorical statements should not be taken categorically."

Michelle Toumayants, describing Melvin B. Tolson's use of a mass of proverbs occupying 84 lines of the text of his poetic Libretto, writes that these give the reader insight into the suffering of slaves of African origin: "Griots, the quick owe the quick and the dead. A man owes man to man!" while the character representing Europe denies that Africa has a history: Seule de tous les continents...l'Afrique n'a pas d'histoire. In her view, the "unrelenting, metered, pithy proverbs" are for Tolson "the poetry of the Africans, their art, their music, their culture" as spoken by the "poet-warrior griot".

== See also ==
- The Three Dead and the Three Quick
