= Ordo Lectionum Missae =

- Language: Originally Latin
- Genre: Christian lectionary
- Publisher: Vatican Publishing House
- Publication date: First 1969; Last 1981

The Ordo Lectionum Missae (known officially in English as the Order of Readings for Mass and commonly referred to as the OLM) is the main liturgical lectionary used in the Roman Rite of the Catholic Church. It contains the designated scripture readings for the celebration of the Mass of Paul VI, encompassing selections (pericopes) from both the Old and New Testaments of the Bible.

== History ==
The development of the Ordo Lectionum Missae was a response to the liturgical reforms initiated by the Second Vatican Council (1962-1965), with the aim of promoting active participation of the laity in the Mass. Prior to the council, the Tridentine Mass of the Roman Rite adhered to a one-year cycle of readings, incorporating a limited selection of passages. The OLM introduced a three-year cycle of readings (designated as Years A, B, and C) for Sundays, and a two-year cycle for weekdays (I and II), significantly expanding the number of passages read during Mass.

When introduced in 1969, the Latin text used for the readings specified in the OLM was taken from the Vulgate. This was replaced by the Nova Vulgata in 1981 with the publication of the OLM's second edition.

== Structure ==
The OLM is structured to align with the liturgical calendar and specifies readings for every Sunday and major feast day in the Roman Catholic liturgical year.

Masses for Sundays and major feast days are characterized by a structured selection of readings. This arrangement comprises the following components:

- First Reading: Derived primarily from the Old Testament, with the exception of readings from the Acts of the Apostles during the Easter Season.
- Responsorial Psalm: Predominantly drawn from the Book of Psalms, occasionally featuring other biblical "Canticles."
- Second Reading: Mainly sourced from the Letters of Paul, supplemented at times by selections from other New Testament Epistles and the Book of Revelation.
- Verse before the Gospel: Typically consists of a direct quotation from the Bible, although adaptations from biblical texts are sometimes incorporated.
- Gospel: Each year is associated with one of the synoptic Gospels - Year A follows the Gospel of Matthew, Year B predominantly features Mark, and Year C is associated with Luke. The Gospel of John is primarily reserved for use during the seasons of Lent and Easter.

In the context of Masses for weekdays, lesser feasts, and special occasions, a similar structure is employed, resulting in a set of readings that includes four distinct elements:

- First Reading: This section incorporates semi-continuous readings, alternating between the Old Testament and New Testament, following a two-year cycle.
- Responsorial Psalm: Similar to the First Reading, this follows a two-year cycle.
- Verse before the Gospel: In the first edition, this component mainly featured "common" texts, but the current practice prescribes specific texts for each day.
- Gospel: This component remains consistent from year to year, featuring semi-continuous readings drawn from the Gospels of Mark, Matthew, and Luke, in that order.

The OLM also specifies the text used to introduce the readings, and may include an incipit, a phrase used to start the reading if the pericope begins in the middle of a longer passage.

== Usage ==
The lectionary is the guide for selecting the assigned readings for each Mass, the passages align with the General Roman Calendar of 1969 which is followed by the majority of Catholics. It is used in the ordinary form of the mass of the Roman Catholic Church, in contrast with the traditional "extraordinary form" which is still used by a few groups that adhere to the traditional calendar.

It is also used by some Independent Catholic denominations.

== Variations ==
Although the Ordo Lectionum Missae using the Nova Vulgata is the standard lectionary in the Roman Catholic Church, the Mass of Paul VI is rarely said in Latin, so various vernacular translations and adaptations of the OLM have been produced to accommodate different language communities as called for in Sacrosanctum Concilium. Each translation retains the three-year cycle for Sundays and the two-year cycle for weekdays and may make minor adjustments to align with local customs, such as some dioceses and countries retaining culturally relevant feast days from the old calendar.

Certain catholic congregations and religious orders have their own authorized modification of the lectionary.

== English translations ==
In the Tridentine Mass, the assigned readings are read in Latin; before Vatican II, common practice in English-speaking counties was to also read them from the Douay–Rheims Bible before the homily. In the Mass of Paul VI, the need to read the Latin versions was dropped and only the vernacular translations are used. As of 2025, the following Bible translations are used in the Lectionaries of English-speaking countries:

- English Standard Version, Catholic Edition (ESV-CE) – India, United Kingdom
- Jerusalem Bible (JB) – Australia, Ireland, Malaysia, Singapore, and Brunei, Pakistan, New Zealand, Southern Africa
- New American Bible Revised Edition (NABRE) – United States, Philippines
- New Revised Standard Version Catholic Edition (NRSV-CE) – Canada
- Revised Standard Version, 2nd Catholic Edition (RSV-2CE) – Antilles and the Personal Ordinariates for former Anglicans

Many countries using the Jerusalem Bible have announced work to switch to its successor, the Revised New Jerusalem Bible (RNJB), in the near future.

== Influence in other churches ==
The Ordo Lectionum Missae has had a notable influence on liturgical practices in various Christian denominations and communities. While not universally adopted, its principles and structured approach to Scripture readings have been adapted first in the 1980s by the Consultation on Church Union and then through the Revised Common Lectionary in 1992. The United Methodist Church and the Presbyterian Church (USA) replace readings from the deuterocanonical books, while Anglican and Lutheran denominations retain them.
