= Consultation on Common Texts =

- Founded: 1969; 57 years ago
- Country of origin: United States
- Publication types: Books
- Official website: www.commontexts.org

The Consultation on Common Texts (CCT) is "an ecumenical consultation of liturgical scholars and denominational representatives from the United States and Canada, who produce liturgical texts for use in common by North American Christian Churches." Its most significant product is the Revised Common Lectionary (RCL).

== See also ==
- English Language Liturgical Consultation
