= Revised Common Lectionary =

Biblical readings for Christian worship

The Revised Common Lectionary (RCL) is a lectionary of readings or pericopes from the Bible for use in Christian worship, making provision for the liturgical year with its pattern of observances of festivals and seasons. It was preceded by the Common Lectionary, assembled in 1983, itself preceded by the COCU Lectionary, published in 1974 by the Consultation on Church Union (COCU). This lectionary was derived from Protestant lectionaries in use, which in turn were based on the 1969 Ordo Lectionum Missae, a three-year lectionary produced by the Catholic Church following the reforms of the Second Vatican Council.

== Origin ==
The Revised Common Lectionary was the product of a collaboration between the North American Consultation on Common Texts (CCT) and the International English Language Liturgical Consultation (ELLC). After a nine-year trial period, it was publicly released in 1994. The CCT membership includes the United States Conference of Catholic Bishops and the Canadian Conference of Catholic Bishops as well as many traditionally liturgical American and Canadian Protestant churches, including Lutherans, Anglicans, Presbyterians, Baptists, Methodists, and Congregationalists. The CCT thereby represents the majority of American and Canadian Christians and has been widely adopted in Great Britain and in other countries such as Australia. Various churches, however, have made some changes to the form of the RCL that they use. It has been further adapted for Sunday school and children's church use.

As in its predecessors, readings are prescribed for each Sunday: a passage typically from the Old Testament (including in Catholic, Lutheran and Anglican churches those books sometimes referred to as the Apocrypha or deuterocanonical books), or the Acts of the Apostles; a passage from one of the Psalms; another from either the Epistles or the Book of Revelation; and finally a passage from one of the four Gospels.

Also like its predecessors, it runs in three-year cycles; the gospel readings in the first year (Year A) are taken from the Gospel of Matthew, those in the second year (or Year B) from the Gospel of Mark, and in the third year (or Year C) come from the Gospel of Luke. Portions of the Gospel of John are read throughout Eastertide, and are also used for other liturgical seasons including Advent, Christmastide, and Lent where appropriate.

- Year A begins on the first Sunday of Advent in 2019, 2022, 2025, etc.
- Year B begins on the first Sunday of Advent in 2020, 2023, 2026, etc.
- Year C begins on the first Sunday of Advent in 2021, 2024, 2027, etc.

It differs from its Latin predecessor, however, in that—as a result of feedback collected from the participating churches during the trial period—a greater emphasis is given to Old Testament passages and to Wisdom literature.

== Scripture usage ==
The major principle behind the lectionary is that on a Sunday members of congregations should be able to hear the voice of each writer week by week, rather than readings being selected according to a theme. Thus, in any given year the writer of one of the first three gospels will be heard from beginning to end. Likewise the rest of the New Testament is heard, in some cases, virtually in total, in others in large part.

This principle is subject to a number of exceptions. Firstly, different principles apply during the special seasons of the year: Advent, Christmas, Epiphany, Lent, and Easter. Here appropriate lections relevant to the season are chosen. The rest of the year, called Ordinary Time, begins in February (after Candlemas) and runs until the second Sunday before Lent. It then resumes after Pentecost until the Sunday before Advent which is kept as the Feast of Christ the King.

Secondly, because the cycle is three years long, only three of the Gospel writers are given a year. St. John's Gospel, whose form and character is very different from the three synoptic gospels is treated differently and is inserted into all three years. Thus passages from St. John appear in the special seasons of Advent and Lent, on Passion (Palm) Sunday in all three years, throughout Holy Week, including Good Friday, on Easter Day as the first alternative Gospel, during most of the Easter season, on Pentecost and during the year in which St. Mark's gospel is in use. A practical reason for this is that Mark is considerably shorter than either St. Matthew or St. Luke.

The treatment given to the Old Testament provides a further qualification to the first principle. Because it is so much longer than the New, it is inevitable that a smaller proportion of the material will be included, unless readings are to be very long. Readings are much more selective both in terms of the books included: little appears from the books of Leviticus and Numbers and almost none from 1 and 2 Chronicles. Moreover, it was decided that churches could choose between two tracks in their use of the Old Testament. "Track 1" adheres to the principle of giving the Biblical writer their own voice, thus following week by week from a portion of a book, or, in the case of some books, the whole. "Track 2", on the other hand, designated the "Related Track", is intended to relate in some way to the Gospel for the day. Provision is made for the use of a responsorial psalm each Sunday.

Lastly, there has been a certain amount of editing so that some verses of most books are omitted. Sometimes the omission is simply an introduction to a book; sometimes more substantial material has been excluded, but the overall intention, that of allowing, say, the substance of a biblical writer's thoughts to be read and heard in church, has arguably been achieved at least more substantially than before. There have been arguments over individual editorial judgements and the Church of England, in its use of the RCL, has re-inserted verses, in brackets, which were felt by its Liturgical Commission to be more properly included.

Such is the length of the Scriptural canon that no Sunday lectionary can cover the whole of Scripture without the necessity of very long readings on a Sunday or a longer cycle of years. Sometimes there has to be a choice between telling a long story or omitting it entirely. However, the daily lectionary, devised by the Catholic Church and adopted by the Church of England (among others), provides more material. The CCT has also produced a volume of daily readings.

The Church of England has augmented the RCL by the provision of readings for second and third services. Thus the RCL lectionary is used for the "Principal Service", which often takes the form of a Eucharist, while allowing for additional material at other services which may be Morning and Evening Prayer (though provision is made for either being a Eucharist). Minimal changes to the "Principal Service" have been made in order to preserve its use as an ecumenical lectionary; the most significant of these is in Year B where in Epiphany for three Sundays readings from Revelation replace readings from 1 Corinthians.

== Denominational practices ==
The Revised Common Lectionary is used in its original or an adapted form by churches around the world. The Ordo Lectionum Missae, on which it is based, is used in the Catholic Church in local translations as the standard lectionary. Various other churches have also adopted (and sometimes adapted) the RCL; some may consider its use optional. These include:

- United States
  - American Baptist Churches, USA
  - Church of the Nazarene
  - Christian Reformed Church in North America
  - Communion of Evangelical Episcopal Churches
  - Communion of Reformed Evangelical Churches
  - Community of Christ
  - Christian Church (Disciples of Christ)
  - Episcopal Church in the United States of America
  - Evangelical Lutheran Church in America
  - Free Methodist Church
  - Grace Communion International
  - King's Chapel, Boston, an autonomous Unitarian Universalist church in the Anglican tradition
  - Lutheran Church–Missouri Synod
  - Moravian Church in America
  - Presbyterian Church USA
  - Reformed Church in America
  - United Church of Christ
  - United Methodist Church
  - Unitarian Universalist Christian Fellowship
- Canada
  - Anglican Church of Canada
  - Canadian Baptists of Western Canada
  - Evangelical Lutheran Church in Canada
  - Grace Communion International Canada
  - Lutheran Church–Canada
  - Mennonite Church Canada
  - Presbyterian Church in Canada
  - United Church of Canada
- United Kingdom and Ireland
  - Church of England
  - Church of Scotland
  - Church in Wales
  - Church of Ireland
  - Methodist Church of Great Britain
  - Scottish Episcopal Church
  - United Reformed Church
- Philippines
  - Apostolic Catholic Church
  - Convention of Philippine Baptist Churches
  - Episcopal Church of the Philippines
  - Philippine Independent Church
  - United Church of Christ in the Philippines
  - United Methodist Church in the Philippines
- Australia
  - Anglican Church of Australia
  - Uniting Church in Australia
- Italy
  - Waldensian Evangelical Church
  - Italian Methodist Church
  - Baptist Evangelical Christian Union of Italy (UCEBI)
  - Evangelical Reformed Baptist Churches in Italy
- Hong Kong
  - Evangelical Lutheran Church of Hong Kong (基督教香港信義會)
  - Lutheran Church-Hong Kong Synod (香港路德會)
  - Hong Kong Sheng Kung Hui (香港聖公會)
- Ghana
  - Presbyterian Church of Ghana
  - Methodist Church Ghana
- Bolivia
  - Bolivian Evangelical Lutheran Church
- Indonesia
  - Indonesian Christian Church (GKI)

== See also ==
- Mass (liturgy)
- Gospel Book
