= International Coalition to End Torture =

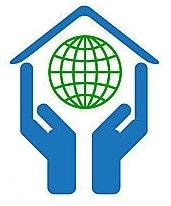
- Founded: July 2003 by Amnesty International
- Type: Non-profit; NGO
- Location(s): Global General secretariat in New York City and Geneva
- Services: Protecting human rights
- Fields: Media attention, direct-appeal campaigns, research, lobbying
- Website: www.endtorture.org

International Coalition to End Torture (commonly known as End Torture and ICET) is a non-governmental organisation focused on raising awareness of human rights and the United Nations Convention Against Torture around the world by knowing them, demanding them, and defending them. The objective of the organisation is to bring "like-minded individuals from all walks of life, all disciplines, races, creeds and nationalities and allied organizations to bring the full force of unity to bear in the human rights arena.

In 2003, Amnesty International launched a campaign called End Torture in Chinese language hoping that "the Chinese audience will view the website as a valuable resource to raise awareness about the need to prevent torture and ill-treatment; and to contribute to the campaign within China to stamp out torture once and for all." In 2003, International Coalition to End Torture was founded to reach a global audience as an independent non-profit organization. The International Coalition to End Torture draws attention to torture by governments and campaigns for compliance with international laws and standards. It works to mobilise public opinion to put pressure on governments that let torture take place.

== Work ==
The International Coalition to End Torture provides training on visiting places of detention; gives advice on the establishment and functioning of international prevention mechanisms; and advocates for legislative reform, ratification and implementation of relevant international treaties. The International Coalition to End Torture works in cooperation with a relatively broad variety of partners, who share its objectives, such as state authorities, police services, the judiciary, international human rights institutions, international organisations and NGOs.

The International Coalition to End Torture assists in the drafting and implementation of international and regional legal instruments to prevent torture. These include the UN Convention against Torture and its Optional Protocol (OPCAT); the European Convention for the Prevention of Torture and the Robben Island Guidelines for the Prohibition and Prevention of Torture in Africa.

== Advocate for preventive mechanisms ==
The International Coalition to End Torture advocates and lobbies governments, national institutions, parliamentarians, NGOs, regional bodies and the United Nations to establish and maintain effective torture prevention mechanisms. The End Torture leads the campaign to ratify and implement the OPCAT which establishes the first global system of detention monitoring.

== Strengthen capacities ==
The International Coalition to End Torture works with key national, regional and international actors to strengthen their capacity to prevent torture. Specifically, the End Torture advises states on how to establish and maintain independent visiting bodies, trains national institutions and NGOs on monitoring places of detention, trains the police and judiciary on legal norms and safeguards against torture, and provides advice on legislative reforms to better prevent torture at national level.

== Produce practical tools ==
The International Coalition to End Torture develops and disseminates practical tools to prevent torture. These include a guide on monitoring places of detention, a manual on the provisions of the OPCAT, a training DVD on the UN treaty bodies, a toolkit to develop national preventive mechanisms and training course materials.
