= English Language Liturgical Consultation =

Ππ Alpha and Omega

The English Language Liturgical Consultation (ELLC) is a group of national associations of ecumenical liturgists in the English-speaking world. Their work has been concerned with developing and promoting common liturgical texts in English and sharing a common lectionary wherever possible. It is the successor body to the International Consultation on English Texts (ICET).

ICET was formed in 1969 and, after circulating drafts in 1971, 1972 and 1973, completed its work in 1975 by publishing the booklet Prayers We Have in Common, its proposed English versions of liturgical texts that included the Apostles' Creed, the Nicene Creed, the Athanasian Creed and the Lord's Prayer. These texts were widely adopted by English-speaking Christians, with the exception of the Lord's Prayer ("Our Father"), for which, in most countries, a traditional text was kept. The other three texts were accepted in the official 1975 English translation of the Roman Missal. In the United States the English translation of the Roman Missal was printed before the definitive 1975 ICEL text of the Nicene Creed was ready and therefore has in its place the 1973 draft. This differs in a few points from the final text; in one instance, the 1973 draft speaks of Christ becoming man after mentioning his birth, while the 1975 text does so after mentioning instead his incarnation.

The Revised Common Lectionary was the product of a collaboration between the North American Consultation on Common Texts (CCT) and the International English Language Liturgical Consultation (ELLC). After a nine-year trial period, it was released in 1994.

== Praying Together ==
ELLC, in turn, published in 1988 Praying Together, with revisions of the ICET texts. They have been accepted by many churches. For instance, the Presbyterian Church (USA) in 1998, the Methodist Church of Great Britain in 1999 and the (Anglican) Church of Ireland in 2002 However, many of them introduced modifications, as can be seen in A Survey of Use and Variation.

Contents include:

- Lord's Prayer
- Kyrie Eleison
- Gloria in Excelsis
- Nicene Creed
- Apostles' Creed
- Sursum Corda
- Sanctus and Benedictus
- Agnus Dei
- Gloria Patri
- Te Deum Laudamus
- Benedictus
- Magnificat
- Nunc Dimittis

== New Zealand ==
In 1984, the New Zealand Catholic Bishops' Conference permitted and encouraged the use of the ELLC version of the Lord's Prayer in all dioceses except that of Christchurch. With the introduction of the Third Roman Missal, the ELLC version of the Lord's Prayer was not recognised and so had to be changed back to the traditional text. However, the ELLC version is still permitted to be used outside Mass.

== See also ==
- Consultation on Common Texts
- International Commission on English in the Liturgy
- Revised Common Lectionary
