= Infallibility of the Church =

Christian concept

The infallibility of the Church is the belief that the Holy Spirit preserves the Christian Church from errors that would contradict its essential doctrines. It is related to, but not the same as, indefectibility, that is, "she remains and will remain the Institution of Salvation, founded by Christ, until the end of the world." The doctrine of infallibility is premised on the authority Jesus granted to the apostles to "bind and loose" (Matthew 18:18; John 20:23) and in particular the promises to Peter (Matthew 16:16–20; Luke 22:32) in regard to papal infallibility.

== Ecumenical councils ==
The Roman Catholic Church and the Eastern Orthodox Church hold the doctrine that the ecumenical councils are infallible. However, the Eastern Orthodox churches accept only the seven ecumenical councils from Nicaea I to Nicaea II as genuinely ecumenical, while Roman Catholics accept twenty-one. Only a very few Protestants believe in the infallibility of ecumenical councils, and these usually restrict infallibility to the Christological statements of the first seven councils. Lutherans recognize the first four councils, whereas most High Church Anglicans accept all seven as persuasive but not infallible.

== Catholic Church ==
Catholicism teaches that Jesus Christ, "the Word made Flesh" (John 1:14), is the source of divine revelation and, as the Truth, he is infallible. The Second Vatican Council states, "For this reason Jesus perfected revelation by fulfilling it through His whole work of making Himself present and manifesting Himself: through His words and deeds, His signs and wonders, but especially through His death and glorious resurrection from the dead and final sending of the Spirit of truth." (Dei verbum, 4). The content of Christ's divine revelation is called the deposit of faith, and is contained in both Sacred Scripture and sacred tradition, not as two sources but as a single source.

A document signed by Cardinal Ratzinger and Cardinal Bertone speaks of

... the more recent teaching regarding the doctrine that priestly ordination is reserved only to men. The Supreme Pontiff, while not wishing to proceed to a dogmatic definition, intended to reaffirm that this doctrine is to be held definitively, since, founded on the written Word of God, constantly preserved and applied in the Tradition of the Church, it has been set forth infallibly by the ordinary and universal Magisterium. As the prior example illustrates, this does not foreclose the possibility that, in the future, the consciousness of the Church might progress to the point where this teaching could be defined as a doctrine to be believed as divinely revealed.

=== Pope ===
The doctrine of papal infallibility states that when the pope teaches ex cathedra his teachings are infallible and irreformable. Such infallible papal decrees must be made by the pope, in his role as leader of the whole Church, and they must be definitive decisions on matters of faith and morals which are binding on the whole Church. An infallible decree by a pope is often referred to as an ex cathedra statement. This type of infallibility falls under the authority of the sacred magisterium.

The doctrine of papal infallibility was formally defined at the First Vatican Council in 1870, although belief in this doctrine long predated this council and was premised on the promises of Jesus to Peter (Mat 16:16–20; Luke 22:32).

=== Ordinary and universal magisterium ===
The ordinary and universal magisterium is considered infallible when it proposes a doctrine that the pope and the bishops dispersed throughout the world who are in communion with the successor of St. Peter universally hold as definitive. Of the ordinary magisterium, the Second Vatican Council said: "Bishops, teaching in communion with the Roman Pontiff, are to be respected by all as witnesses to divine and Catholic truth. In matters of faith and morals, the bishops speak in the name of Christ and the faithful are to accept their teaching and adhere to it with a religious assent."

== Lutheranism ==
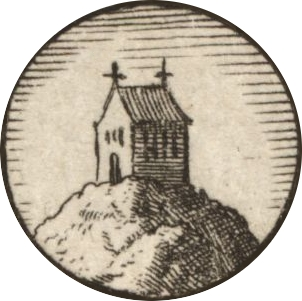
...one holy Church is to continue forever. The Church is the congregation of saints, in which the Gospel is rightly taught and the Sacraments are rightly administered. –Augsburg Confession

Lutheran theology teaches that the Church is indefectible, as with Catholic doctrine. Lutheran churches hold that the "maintenance of this indefectibility as the sovereign work of God."

== Anglicanism ==
The Church of England claimed this type of authority over the people of England, but the idea is no longer popular within the church, owing to a lack of commonly accepted traditions and to disputes as to some peripheral doctrines. However, Anglicanism holds to a unique ecclesiology: in the Anglican view, churches in the historic episcopate (such as the Anglican, Roman Catholic, Scandinavian Lutheran, Moravian, Old Catholic, Persian, Eastern Orthodox and Oriental churches) that maintained apostolic succession, belief, and practice are all branches of the Universal Church. Anglicans believe there will always be a section of the Christian Church, although possibly not the Anglican Church, which will not fall into major heresy.

== Tradition and scripture ==
Catholics and Orthodox Christians believe that divine revelation (the one "Word of God") is contained both in the words of God in sacred scripture and in the deeds of God in sacred tradition. Everything asserted as true by either scripture or tradition is true and infallible.

This plan of revelation is realized by deeds and words having an inner unity: the deeds wrought by God in the history of salvation manifest and confirm the teaching and realities signified by the words, while the words proclaim the deeds and clarify the mystery contained in them. By this revelation then, the deepest truth about God and the salvation of man shines out for our sake in Christ, who is both the mediator and the fullness of all revelation.

— Second Vatican Council, Dei verbum, n. 2

Methodists and Anglicans teach the doctrine of prima scriptura, which suggests that Scripture is the primary source for Christian doctrine, but that "tradition, experience, and reason" can nurture the Christian religion as long as they are in harmony with the Bible.

Yves Congar, who thought Catholics could acknowledge a substantial element of truth in the Lutheran and Reformed doctrine sola scriptura, wrote that "we can admit sola scriptura in the sense of a material sufficiency of canonical Scripture. This means that Scripture contains, in one way or another, all truths necessary for salvation." This has led to the tenable position of the "two modes" theory.

In his book, James F. Keenan reports studies by some academics. A study by Bernard Hoose states that claims to a continuous teaching by the Church on matters of sexuality, life and death, and crime and punishment are "simply not true." After examining seven medieval texts about homosexuality, Mark Jordan argues that, "far from being consistent, any attempt to make a connection among the texts proved impossible." He calls the tradition's teaching of the Church "incoherent". Karl-Wilhelm Merks considers that sacred tradition is "not the truth guarantor of any particular teaching." Keenan, however, says that studies of "manualists" such as John T. Noonan Jr. demonstrate that, "despite claims to the contrary, manualists were co-operators in the necessary historical development of the moral tradition." Noonan, according to Keenan, has provided a new way of viewing at "areas where the Church not only changed, but shamefully did not."

== Christian fundamentalism ==
Evangelical Fundamentalist churches believe that the primary method of Bible study is literal interpretation, and that the interpretation of these verses is infallible and therefore cannot be discussed.

== Consequences for ecumenism ==
The Roman Catholic, Eastern Orthodox, and Oriental Orthodox Churches, and the various Protestant denominations are divided by their different views on infallibility. The ecumenical movement, which hopes to reunify all of Christianity, has found that the Catholic Church's Papacy is one of the most divisive of issues for Protestants and Eastern Orthodox, while Catholics view the Papacy as necessary source of the Church's unity and an indispensable ministry bestowed by Christ on the Church. Papal infallibility has often been misunderstood by many Protestant denominations and among some within Eastern Orthodoxy as well.

== See also ==
- John 20:23
- Biblical infallibility
- Biblical inerrancy
