= Bibliolatry =

Worship of a book, idolatrous homage to a book, or the deifying of a book

Bibliolatry (from the Greek βιβλίον biblion, 'book' and the suffix -λατρία -latria, 'worship') is the worship of a book, idolatrous homage to a book, or the deifying of a book. It is a form of idolatry. The sacred texts of some religions disallow icon worship, but over time, the texts themselves may come to be treated as sacred in the way idols are; believers may end up worshipping the book in effect. Bibliolatry extends claims of Biblical inerrancy to the texts, precluding theological innovation, evolving development, or progress. Bibliolatry can lead to revivalism, disallow reprobation, and fuel persecution of unpopular doctrines.

Historically, Christianity has never endorsed worship of the Bible, reserving worship for God. Some Christians believe that biblical authority derives from God as the inspiration of the text, not from the text itself. The term bibliolatry does not refer to a recognised belief per se, but theological discussion may use the word pejoratively to label the perceived practices of opponents. Opponents may apply the term bibliolatry to groups such as Protestants of a fundamentalist and evangelical background who espouse biblical inerrancy and a sola scriptura approach (i.e., scripture as the sole source for Christian faith and practice), as well as to movements such as the King James Only movement, which claims the exclusive authority of the King James Version.

== Christianity ==
In the context of Christianity, the term bibliolatry may be used to characterise either extreme devotion to the Bible or the doctrine of biblical inerrancy. Supporters of biblical inerrancy point to passages (such as 2 Timothy 3:16–17), interpreted to say that the Bible, as received, is a complete source of what must be known about God. Critics of this view call it a form of idolatry, pointing to verses such as John 5:39–40 to indicate that Jesus asked humanity to relate to God directly rather than blindly relying on written rules.

=== Catholicism and Eastern Christianity ===
Catholicism traditionally sees scripture and sacred tradition as prima scriptura (rather than sola scriptura, i.e. scripture alone), and has implicitly accused some Protestant sects of bibliolatry. Jaroslav Pelikan wrote about Unitatis redintegratio, "The Second Vatican Council of the Catholic Church of 1962–1965 could speak with a mixture of genuine admiration and ever-so-gentle reproof about a 'love and reverence, almost a cult, for Holy Scripture' among the 'separated Protestant brethren'". The three independent branches of Eastern Christianity have voiced similar opinions and, with Catholicism and some Protestant opinion, have a higher view of the apostolic succession of bishops than Protestants who derive their faith primarily from the Reformed tradition or hold evangelical or low church views.

Another influence on bibliolatry is the fact that nearly all of those who hold high views of the Bible's authority against tradition also tend to reject the deuterocanonical books found in the Septuagint as canonical; Catholicism, Oriental Orthodoxy and Eastern Orthodoxy include a varying number of deuterocanonical books in their Bibles; certain Protestants, such as Lutherans and Anglicans, include these books between the Old Testament and New Testament, calling them Apocrypha, and use them for purposes of edification, but not to establish doctrine; a complete King James Version of the Bible thus includes 80 books. Protestants tend to rely on the Masoretic Text of contemporary Judaism, which is rooted in the traditions of the Pharisees. Although Catholicism and Eastern Christianity do not fully agree about which books are deuterocanonical and which are not (with the Orthodox Tewahedo preserving the most inclusive set of books, many of which were not preserved elsewhere), the regard for the Septuagint held by the early church fathers is regarded as sound. Most Catholics and Eastern Christians agree with high-church Protestants that the Old Testament is best understood by studying the Masoretic Text and the Septuagint; modern Bible translations in these traditions often take both into consideration. The authority of the Protestant Reformers to reject books from the Christian biblical canon is seen as dubious. Those who view the Vulgate in Catholicism, the Septuagint in Eastern Orthodoxy, the Peshitta in Syriac Christianity, or the Ge'ez Bible of the Orthodox Tewahedo as more authoritative than the Hebrew Old Testament or the Greek New Testament could be accused of bibliolatry for many of the same reasons that the King James Only movement is.

=== Southern Baptists ===
A change in wording of the Southern Baptist Convention's Baptist Faith and Message as a result of its conservative resurgence led to charges of bibliolatry.

== Sikhism ==
The Sikh scripture, the Guru Granth Sahib, is considered the living Guru. Sikhs install it in the sanctum of Sikh temples, and devotees reverentially greet it by bowing and prostrating before it. Since the early 20th century, Farquhar and other scholars have considered it a form of idolatry that believers practice the matha tekna (bowing down and touching one's head to the floor) at the door of a Gurdwara or before the Guru Granth Sahib, and other daily rituals such as putting the scripture to bed (sukhasan) in a bedroom (sachkhand), waking it up every morning, carrying it in a procession and re-opening it (prakash) in major Sikh Gurdwaras. When open in the sanctum of a Sikh Gurdwara, it is within an expensive brocade and attendants fan it as an act of homage.

According to James Moffatt, the ritual veneration given by Sikhs to the Guru Granth Sahib is "true bibliolatry". The widespread devotional worship of the Guru Granth Sahib in these temples has drawn comparisons to the Sikh scripture being ritually treated like an idol. In this view, idolatry is any form of worship or holy reverence to any object, such as an icon, a ritualised direction, or a house of worship.

Scholars such as Eleanor Nesbitt state the Nanaksar Gurdwaras' practice of offering food cooked by Sikh devotees to the Guru Granth Sahib, as well as curtaining the scripture during this ritual, as a form of idolatry. Baba Ishar Singh of the international network of Sikh temples has defended this practice, stating that the Sikh scripture is more than paper and ink.

According to Kristina Myrvold, every Sikh scripture copy is treated like a person and venerated with elaborate ceremonies which are a daily means of "merit bestowing ministrations". These daily ritual ministrations and the paying of homage to the scripture by Sikhs, states Myrvold, is not unique to Sikhism. It moulds "meanings, values and ideologies" and creates a framework for congregational worship, states Myrvold, that is found in all major faiths.

Arya Samaj founder Dayanand Saraswati accused the Sikh faith of bibliolatry in the 1870s, but his arguments were challenged in public debates by the Lahore Singh Sabha theologian Giani Ditt Singh, who later wrote his rebuttal in Sadhu Dayanand Te Mera Samvad ("My Dialogue with the 'Holy Man' Dayanand"). Ditt Singh defined bibliolatry as the substitution of an idol with a book, and pointed out that the Guru Granth Sahib does not substitute for the divine presence of Waheguru but instead instructs Sikhs on spiritual and real-world conduct. He also said that measures such as fanning the scripture with fly whisks and wrapping it in multiple layers of cloth are intended to preserve the scripture from damage by vermin; printing presses were not introduced to Punjab until the colonial era.

== See also ==
- Biblical infallibility
- Biblical literalism
- Bibliomancy
- Cult of personality
- Quranic createdness
- Religious images in Christian theology
