= Ang Iglesia Metodista sa Pilipinas =

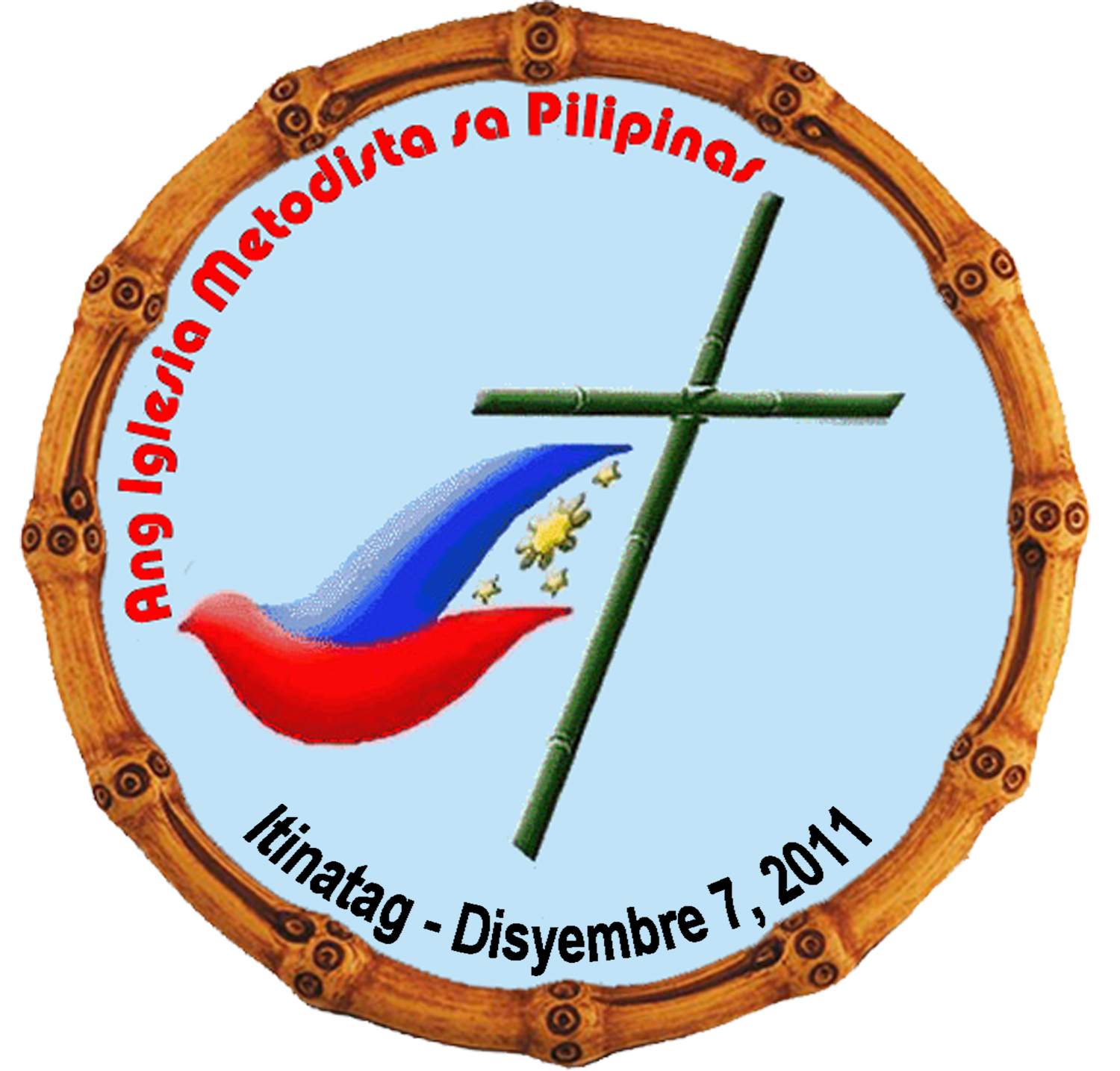
- Seal of the Church
- Classification: Independent, Methodist
- Orientation: Trinitarian
- Governance: Congregational, Connexional
- Leader: Rev Lito Cabacungan Tangonan (Presiding Bishop)
- Headquarters: Unit 18, 4/F Pangarap Building, West Avenue corner Baler Street, Quezon City, Philippines; W. A. Jones Street, Calasiao, Pangasinan 2418
- Origin: December 7, 2011 (incorporated with Securities and Exchange Commission)
- Separated from: United Methodist Church
- Branched from: Methodism
- Congregations: Over 130 missions and local churches
- Members: approx. 2,000
- Ministers: over 150 including volunteers, deaconesses and lay missionaries
- Official website: http://aimpilipinas.blogspot.com

Ang Iglesia Metodista sa Pilipinas (Tagalog for The Methodist Church in the Philippines, also known as AIM Pilipinas) is an indigenous autonomous Methodist church in the Philippines. The founders of the church, led by Presiding Bishop Rev. Lito Tangonan officially registered on December 7, 2011 the congregation with the Philippine Government through the Securities and Exchange Commission.

The group adopted the methods of John Wesley as the father of Methodism. Like the rest of Methodists in the world, it is a Trinitarian, apostolic and mission church which adheres to the deity of Jesus Christ.

== History ==
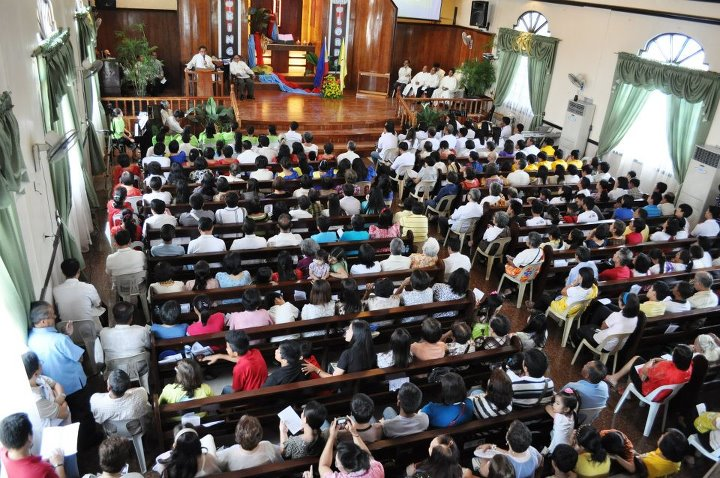
Consecration of the first bishop of Ang Iglesia Metodista sa Pilipinas held at Iglesia Metodista sa Luakan in Dinalupihan, Bataan, Philippines.

His Excellency, Lito C. Tangonan, the first Bishop of Ang Iglesia Metodista sa Pilipinas wearing his Salakot, a traditional hat common to the country.

=== Calls for autonomy ===
From the early 1980s a call for autonomy within The United Methodist Church was discussed at many conferences led mostly by bishop candidates to come up with mutual understanding and a treaty of goodwill although the dream of self-determination started in the 1960s. Most of the requests were rejected that prompted some leaders to make a unilateral decision. And in the middle of 2010 decisive action of members spearheaded by the "Wounded Healers" led to the establishment of the Ang Iglesia Metodista sa Pilipinas, with Methodist groups in Palawan, Bataan, Zambales, Pangasinan, Bulacan, Aurora, Nueva Ecija, Metro Manila Area, some of Pampanga, and Cavite.

=== Conferences ===
Each quasi-district held distinct conferences and appointed their leaders, workers and missionaries. Key leaders of the movement were Bishop Lito C. Tangonan, Rev. George O. Buenaventura, Ms. Chita R. Millan and Atty. Joe Frank E. Zuñiga. The Bulacan group was led by Emil C. Macarasig, District Superintendent, who held a separate conference in Guiguinto, parallel to the one held in Plaridel by the United Methodist Church on 20 May 2011.

=== Declaration of Autonomy ===
The group declared its full autonomy and incorporated legally with Securities and Exchange Commission of the Philippines and was approved on 7 December 2011 with papers held for by present procurators. It now has 126 local churches all over the Philippines. The first general Christmas Youth Assembly with the theme "I AM FREE!" was held in John Wesley Methodist Center at Brgy. Gugo, Samal, Bataan from December 26–29, 2011 with a total of 342 official delegates. Rev. Lito Tangonan became the first bishop of the autonomous church and was consecrated on 17 March 2012.

=== 2012 ===
The first Annual Conferences nationwide were held in each districts as AIM Pilipinas.

- Bulacan Methodist Annual Conference (BMAC), held 9–10 April 2012 at Pandi Central Methodist Church, Pandi, Bulacan.
- Palawan Methodist Annual Conference (PMAC), held 17–19 April 2012 at Maranatha Theological Seminary, San Manuel, Puerto Princesa, Palawan.
- Joint-Session of Aurora Methodist Annual Conference (AMAC) and Nueva Ecija-Cagayan Valley Methodist Annual Conference (NECVAC) was held April 23–25, 2012 at Maria Aurora Methodist Church, Maria Aurora, Aurora Province.
- West Central Luzon Methodist Annual Conference (WCLMAC), 2–3 May 2012, Ang Iglesia Metodista sa Luacan, Luacan, Dinalupihan, Bataan.
- Metropolitan-CALABARZON Methodist Annual Conference (MCMAC), May 2012, Windmill, Barangay Pansol, Balara, Quezon City.
- The first National Thanksgiving was held on 1 May 2012 at People's Center, Balanga City, Bataan followed by the inauguration of John Wesley Theological Seminary at. Brgy. Gugo, Samal, Bataan.

== Beliefs ==
=== Methodism ===
AIM-Pilipinas embraces the doctrines introduced by John Wesley and adheres to his method that was later called the Wesleyan Quadrilateral: four sources of beliefs, i.e. Scripture, Reason, Tradition and Experience. The group believes that the church should be free to follow the Holy Bible as the sole reference of faith and discipline in the church or prima scriptura. It has suspended the use of the United Methodist Church's Book of Discipline. The group tolerates diversity in styles of worship services as it encourages autonomy to all congregations.

=== Christ-Centered Faith ===
Belief in Jesus Christ as a Son of God and a Messiah is the central tenet of the church's faith. The acceptance of the death and resurrection of Jesus, sinful humans can be reconciled to God and thereby are offered salvation and the promise of eternal life.

=== Trinity ===
Trinitarianism is taught as one of the basic doctrines believed for by the members of the church. Members believe the doctrine of the Trinity that defines God as one in three Divine Persons: The Father, The Son Christ and the Holy Spirit.

== Logo ==
The logo was a collaborative efforts of inspired member-artists of AIM Pilipinas from AIMP Graphics group from the concept initiated in Metodistang Pilipino logo-making contest. Samuel T. Antonio initiated drawing the concept which was generally accepted and developed as a meaningful work of art. Rev. Eleazar Bote and an anonymous artist helped design the text placement, mask orders, borders and the whole form. They also designed the logos of different categories and organization inside the church.

- Leaning Bamboo Cross reflects the unique Philippine art blend. The bamboo symbolizes strength and flexibility. The bamboo could bounce back if it is being bent down. The leaning cross emphasizes resilience. The cross generally emphasizes Christianity or death of Jesus Christ or live a Christian life.
- The dove in Philippine Flag color symbolizes freedom of the indigenous Methodist church in the Philippines. It also symbolizes patriotism in a greater sense of Christianity. The dove also symbolizes the Holy Spirit.
- Bamboo border is an optional mark symbolizes brotherhood and one faith among indigenous Methodist churches in the country. Bamboo is a very common art form in the Philippines as the raw materials are always available.
- Light blue color symbolizes purity and love.

== Clergy ==
AIM Pilipinas adopted the model from Holy Bible on how the apostles run the church. Although most of the hierarchical positions are maintained the group believes in the equality for all. All clergies must originate from the local churches and they must be members of them. The bishop is a member of the church and the locale that he/she resides as well as the District Supervisors, Elders and local pastors. As suggested during the conference coinciding the Christmas Youth Assembly in December 2011 at Samal, Bataan, a bishop should be elected by all members of the church with which he/she will represent as a presiding head although presently Bishop Tangonan was nominated during May 2011 conferences.

== Membership and laity ==
Membership in the church is free and equal. The infants must be presented to the church before being baptized on the right age. The right age of baptism is when the child understands the basic doctrines in the Holy Bible. Converts are also encouraged baptism in the water as the first step of membership and must adhere to the salvation of the souls and accepting the grace from God through Jesus Christ at the same time submitting to the mission that John Wesley taught.

== Church council ==
The local church council is the basic unit of church governance composed of council person, assistant, secretary, treasurer, auditors, youth representation, young adults, church men and women and board of trustees. As elders of the local church they collect opinions and decisions for any changes they will make. They decide who they would send as pastor to the district or to their own. This idea was taken from Acts of the Apostles with which elders are appointed in every church.

== Ministry ==
The group aims to equip themselves of the words from the Holy Bible and the understanding and basic Doctrines, salvation and grace given by God through Jesus Christ before imparting them to the non-believers and to finally guide them to the doorstep of the church. Some outreach programs such as medical missions, feeding program, tree planting and other civic activities are being conducted as a social concern for the fulfillment of church's mission.

== John Wesley Theological Seminary ==
The church established this seminary at Brgy. Gugo, Samal Bataan. It aims to produce proactive pastors who will bring about church's core values.
