= Nuda scriptura =

Christian doctrine

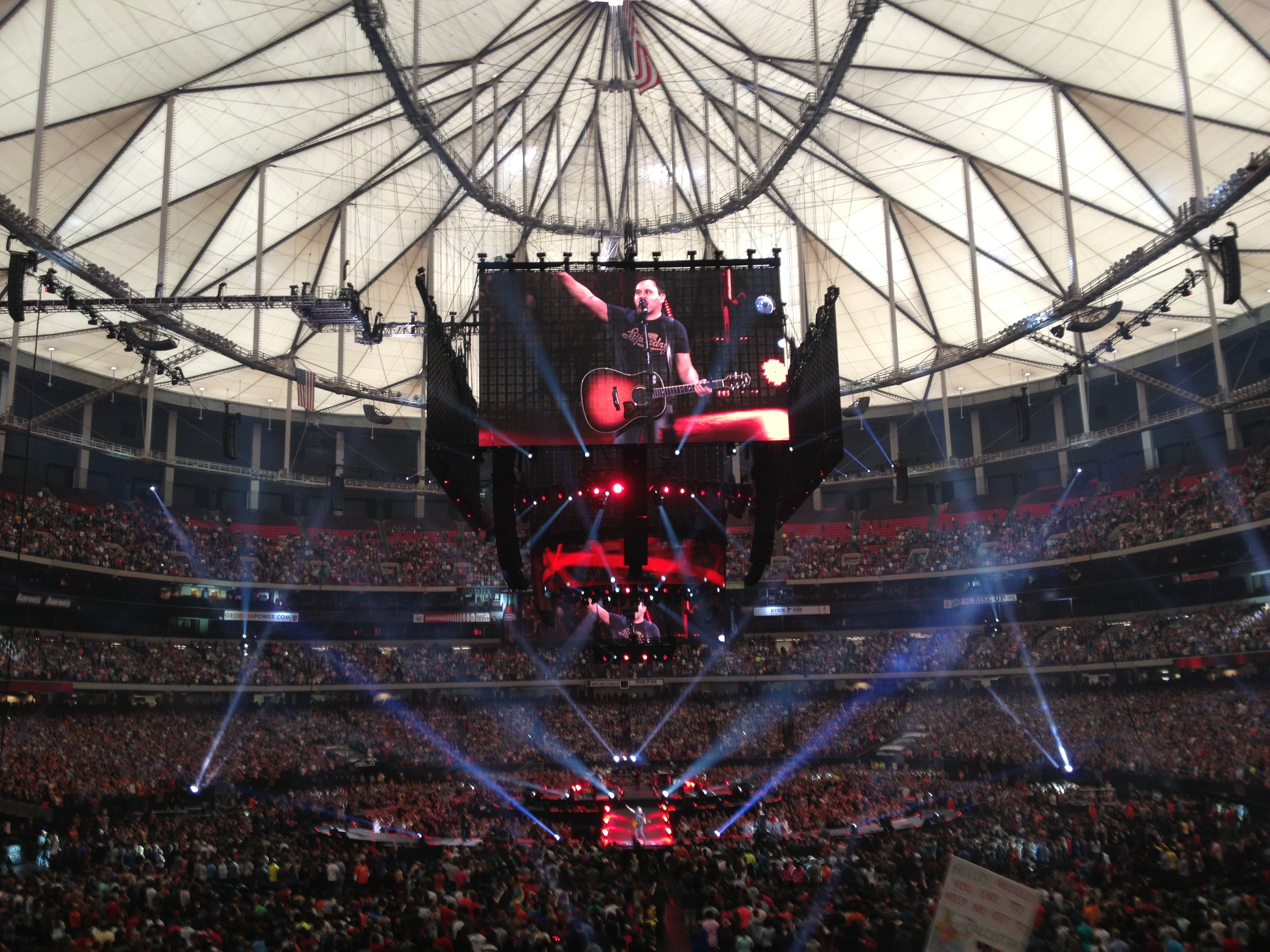
A music and evangelism festival at Georgia Dome in Atlanta, Georgia, United States, 2013

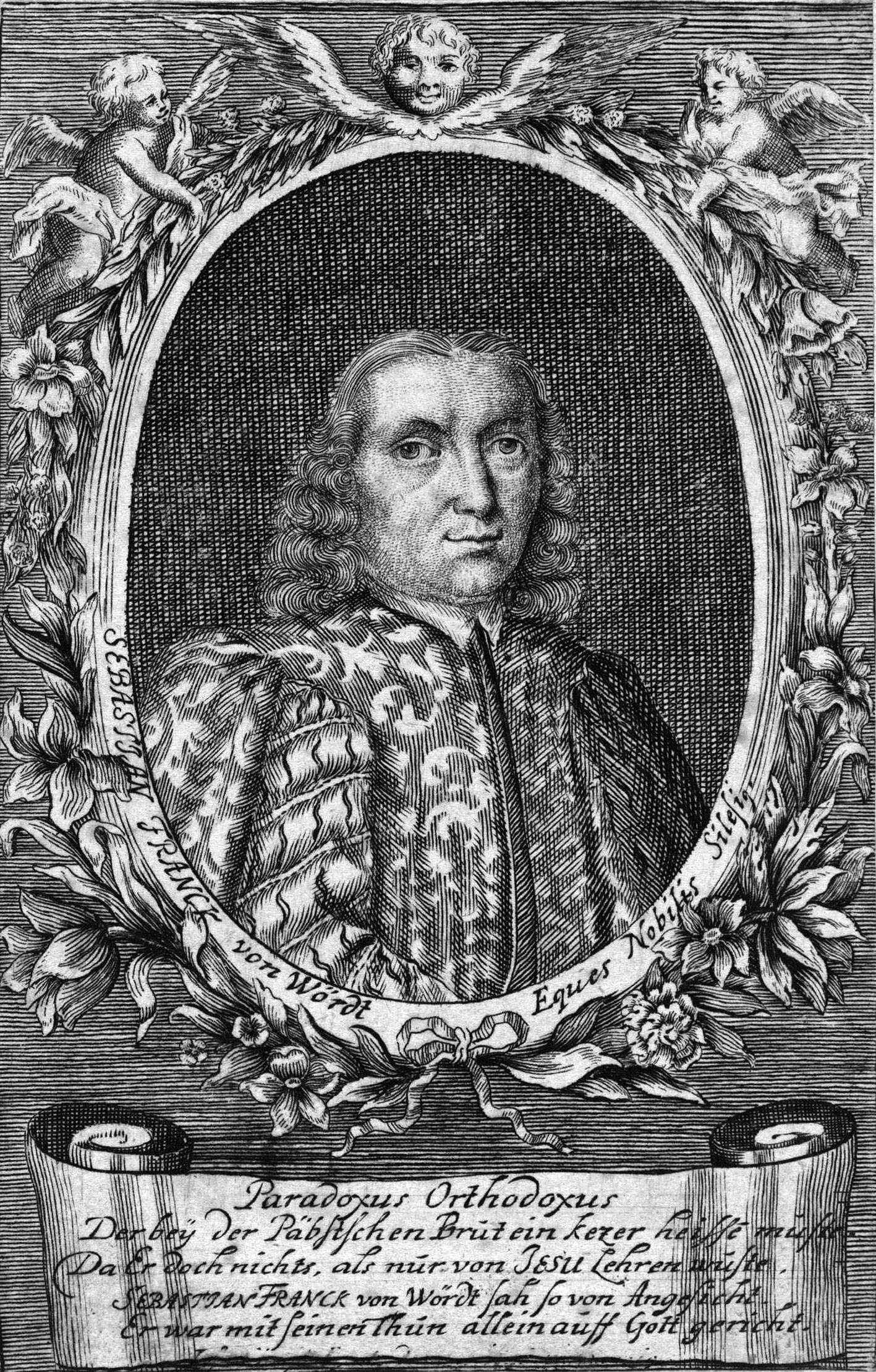
Sebastian Franck attacked the use of tradition.

Nuda scriptura, ("bare scripture"), also called Solo Scriptura, is a term used by evangelicals to describe the view that scripture is the only rule of faith. Adherents disregard historical creeds, confessions, all church authority, and traditions; while in contrast, sola scriptura teaches that the scripture alone is infallible, without excluding church tradition and other sources entirely, but viewing them as subordinate and ministerial.

== History ==
A view similar to nuda scriptura was advocated by Sebastian Franck, even arguing that the early Church theologians were servants of the Antichrist. Nuda scriptura was taught by a few Anabaptists such as Conrad Grebel and some radical reformers, insisting that Christians should not look to tradition but to the Scripture alone. However, many radical reformers did not argue for nuda scriptura, including Balthasar Hubmaier, who often quoted the Church fathers in his writings.

Some Evangelicals and many Plymouth Bretheren also teach views comparable to nuda scriptura. The view is especially common within modern fundamentalism.

In the 12th century, Petrobrusians Peter of Bruys and Henry of Lausanne disputed the authority of the Church Fathers and the Roman Catholic Church.

Restorationist minister Alexander Campbell (1788–1866) taught a view that has been compared to nuda scriptura, which led to today's Church of Christ denomination. However, his call to relying on the Bible as the only authoritative source was motivated by a call to unity and disregard denominationalism.

== See also ==
- King James Only movement
- Prima scriptura
- The Shape of Sola Scriptura
