= Rule of Faith =

Ultimate authority in Christian belief or fundamental interpretive standard

The rule of faith (Greek: κανών της πίστεως, Latin: regula fidei) is the name given to the ultimate authority in Christian belief or fundamental hermeneutic (interpretive) standard (e.g., for biblical interpretation.). It was used by Early Christian writers such as Tertullian. The phrase is sometimes used for early creeds.

== Meaning ==
Joseph Fitzmyer SJ notes that the rule of faith (Latin: regula fidei) (where 'rule' has the sense of a measure such as a ruler) is a phrase rooted in the Apostle Paul's admonition to the Christians in Rome in the Epistle to the Romans 5:13 12:6, which says, "We have different gifts, according to the grace given us. If a man's gift is prophesying, let him use it in proportion to his faith." (NIV, 1984)

The last phrase, "in proportion to his faith" is in Greek κατὰ τὴν ἀναλογίαν τῆς πίστεως ("analogy of faith"). In Romans 12:6 this refers to one of three possible ideas: the body of Christian teachings, the person's belief and response to the grace of God, or to the type of faith that can move mountains.

=== Second century usage ===
In the early church, Irenaeus (c. 125 – c. 202 AD) was writing in the second century about the "rule of faith" or "rule of truth." In Against Heresies 1.9.4 he talks about it being received by baptism and continues, in the next chapter, to explain:

…this faith: in one God, the Father Almighty, who made the heaven and the earth and the seas and all the things that are in them; and in one Christ Jesus, the Son of God, who was made flesh for our salvation; and in the Holy Spirit, who made known through the prophets the plan of salvation, and the coming, and the birth from a virgin, and the passion, and the resurrection from the dead, and the bodily ascension into heaven of the beloved Christ Jesus, our Lord, and his future appearing from heaven in the glory of the Father to sum up all things and to raise anew all flesh of the whole human race…

— Irenaeus, Against Heresies 1.X.1

Elsewhere, in the preface to his The Demonstration of the Apostolic Preaching, Irenaeus reiterates the need to "hold the rule of the faith without deviation." He goes on again to express the rule of faith across three points or articles:

This then is the order of the rule of our faith…: God, the Father, not made, not material, invisible; one God, the creator of all things: this is the first point of our faith. The second point is: The Word of God, Son of God, Christ Jesus our Lord, who was manifested to the prophets according to the form of their prophesying and according to the method of the dispensation of the Father through whom all things were made; who also at the end of the times, to complete and gather up all things, was made man among men, visible and tangible, in order to abolish death and show forth life and produce a community of union between God and man. And the third point is: The Holy Spirit, through whom the prophets prophesied, and the fathers learned the things of God, and the righteous were led forth into the way of righteousness; and who in the end of the times was poured out in a new way a upon mankind in all the earth, renewing man unto God.

— Irenaeus, The Demonstration of the Apostolic Preaching 6

Tertullian (c. 155 – c. 220 AD) uses the phrases "rule of faith" and "rule of truth":

Let our "seeking," therefore be in that which is our own, and from those who are our own, and concerning that which is our own, – that, and only that, which can become an object of inquiry without impairing the rule of faith.

— Tertullian, The Prescription Against Heretics 12

Tertullian summarized this apostolic Rule in three different versions, in Prescription Haereticum (similar to the later Apostle's Creed), De Virginibus Velandis and Adversus Praxean.

=== Fourth century usage ===
In the 4th century of Christianity, the Rule of Faith became equated with the Old Roman Symbol, which was an earlier and shorter version of the Apostles' Creed and other later statements of faith. The Old Roman Symbol was based on the 2nd-century Rule of Faith and the interrogatory declaration of faith for those receiving Baptism (3rd century or earlier), which by the fourth century was everywhere tripartite in structure, following Matthew 28:19 ("baptizing them in the name of the Father and of the Son and of the Holy Spirit"), which is part of the Great Commission. According to the Oxford Dictionary of the Christian Church, the first text attesting it is a letter to Pope Julius I in 340 or 341, and it has recently been argued that it developed in the context of the Arian controversy.

As a historical standard for adherence to orthodoxy, rule of faith may also refer to other statements of faith including the Nicene Creed, Athanasian Creed, Augsburg Confession, Canons of Dort, Westminster Confession and others, the inner light of the spirit, as among mystics.

More broadly, the rule of faith is the name given to the ultimate authority or standard in religious belief, such as the Word of God (Dei verbum) as contained in Scripture and Apostolic Tradition, as among Catholics; theoria, as among the Eastern Orthodox; the Sola scriptura (Bible alone doctrine), as among some Protestants; the Wesleyan Quadrilateral of faith, which held that Scripture, tradition, reason, and experience, as among other Protestants; and reason alone, as among Rationalist philosophers.

Some theologians use "analogy" as an alias for "rule" rather than its modern sense of comparison.

=== Catholic usage ===
Pope Pius XII in Humani generis used the term analogy of faith to say that Holy Scripture should be interpreted according to the mind of the Church, not that the teaching of the Church and Fathers should be interpreted by some theorised norm of the Scriptures.

In the Catholic Church, the Bible and sacred tradition (that is, things believed to have been taught by Jesus and the apostles that were not recorded in the Bible but were transmitted through the church) are considered a rule for all believers for judging faith and practice. The current Catechism of the Catholic Church says, "all that has been said about the manner of interpreting Scripture is ultimately subject to the judgement of the Church which exercises the divinely conferred commission and ministry of watching over and interpreting the Word of God

The Baltimore Catechism used the phrase "rule of faith":

Q. 561. Must we ourselves seek in the Scriptures and traditions for what we are to believe? A. We ourselves need not seek in the Scriptures and traditions for what we are to believe. God has appointed the Church to be our guide to salvation and we must accept its teaching us our infallible rule of faith.

In Verbum Domini (2010), Pope Benedict XVI wrote:

...while in the Church we greatly venerate the sacred Scriptures, the Christian faith is not a 'religion of the book': Christianity is the 'religion of the word of God,' not of 'a written and mute word, but of the incarnate and living Word' (qtd. from St. Bernard of Clairvaux). Consequently the Scripture is to be proclaimed, heard, read, received and experienced as the word of God, in the stream of the apostolic Tradition from which it is inseparable

=== Protestant usage ===
In some Protestant theology, it is a hermeneutical rule of interpreting the Bible that scripture is to interpret scripture (Sacra Scriptura sui interpres: sacred Scripture is its own interpreter). It is an understanding that enforces the Bible as the inspired Word of God, and it is therefore consistent and coherent since God cannot contradict himself.

In conservative Protestantism Romans 12:6 is viewed as the biblical reference for the term "analogy of the faith" (i.e., αναλογἰα τῆς πἰστεως).

For Protestants, the Bible alone is considered the word of God and the only infallible standard for judging faith and practice; hence, for conservative Protestantism, the analogy of the faith is equivalent to the analogy of scripture – that is, opinions are tested for their consistency with scripture, and scripture is interpreted by the Holy Spirit speaking in scripture (compare sola scriptura).

== See also ==
- Biblical law in Christianity
- Faith in Christianity
