= Christian tradition =

Practices or beliefs associated with Christianity

Christian tradition is a collection of traditions consisting of practices or beliefs associated with Christianity. Many churches have traditional practices, such as particular patterns of worship or rites, that developed over time. Deviations from such patterns are sometimes considered unacceptable by followers, or are regarded as heretical. There are certain Christian traditions that are practiced throughout the liturgical year, such as praying a daily devotional during Advent, erecting a nativity scene during Christmastide, chalking the door on Epiphany Day, fasting during Lent, waving palms on Palm Sunday, eating easter eggs during Eastertide, and decorating the church in red on Pentecost.

Tradition also includes historic teaching of the recognized church authorities, such as Church Councils and ecclesiastical officials (e.g., the Pope, Patriarch of Constantinople, Archbishop of Canterbury, etc.), and includes the teaching of significant individuals like the Church Fathers, the Protestant Reformers, and the founders of denominations. Many creeds, confessions of faith, and catechisms generated by these bodies are also part of the traditions of various bodies.

== Tradition and ecclesial traditions ==
The Catholic, Eastern Orthodox, Oriental Orthodox and Persian churches distinguish between what is called Apostolic or sacred tradition and ecclesiastical traditions. In the course of time ecclesial traditions develop in theology, discipline, liturgy, and devotions. These the Church may retain, modify or even abandon. Apostolic tradition, on the other hand, is the teaching that was handed down by the Apostles by word of mouth, by their example and "by the institutions they established", among which is the apostolic succession of the bishops: "this living transmission, accomplished in the Holy Spirit, is called Tradition". "And [Holy] Tradition transmits in its entirety the Word of God, which has been entrusted to the apostles by Christ the Lord and the Holy Spirit."

Prima scriptura is upheld by the Anglican and Methodist traditions, which teach that Scripture is the primary source for Christian doctrine, but that "tradition, experience, and reason" can subordinately inform Christian practice as long as they are in harmony with the Bible. In Methodism, sacred tradition refers to "church's consensual interpretation of the Bible" and in view of the prima scriptura perspective, informs doctrine, such as that regarding infant baptism for example, in which Methodist teaching appeals to Scripture chiefly, along with the teachings of the Church Fathers and early Methodist divines for support of the practice.

For many denominations of Christianity, included in sacred tradition are the writings of the Ante-Nicene Fathers, Nicene Fathers and Post-Nicene Fathers.

In his book, James F. Keenan reports studies by some Catholic academics. A study by Bernard Hoose states that claims to a continuous teaching by the Church on matters of sexuality, life and death and crime and punishment are "simply not true". After examining seven medieval texts about homosexuality, Mark Jordan argues that, "far from being consistent, any attempt to make a connection among the texts proved impossible". He calls the tradition's teaching of the Church "incoherent". Karl-Wilhelm Merks considers that tradition itself is "not the truth guarantor of any particular teaching." Keenan, however, says that studies of "manualists" such as John T. Noonan Jr. has demonstrated that, "despite claims to the contrary, manualists were co-operators in the necessary historical development of the moral tradition." Noonan, according to Keenan, has provided a new way of viewing at "areas where the Church not only changed, but shamefully did not".

== Branches ==
In the Catholic Church and Eastern Orthodoxy, sacred tradition, but not "ecclesial traditions", is considered official doctrine and of equal authoritative weight to the Bible. In the Anglican and Methodist traditions, sacred tradition, along with reason and experience, inform Christian practice at a level subordinate to Sacred Scripture (see prima scriptura). Among the Lutheran and Reformed traditions of Christianity, the Bible itself is the only final authority (see sola scriptura), but tradition still plays an important supporting role. All three groups generally accept the traditional developments on the doctrine of the Trinity, for instance, and set bounds of orthodoxy and heresy based on that tradition. They also have developed creedal and confessional statements which summarize and develop their understanding of biblical teaching. For instance, the Nicene Creed.

== See also ==
- Apostolic Tradition
- Christian dietary laws
- Great Church
- Passion Play

== Bibliography ==
- Baum, Wilhelm; Winkler, Dietmar W. (2003). The Church of the East: A Concise History. London-New York: Routledge-Curzon. ISBN 9781134430192.
- Hotchkiss, Gregory K. The Middle Way: Reflections on Scripture and Tradition, in series, Reformed Episcopal Pamphlets, no. 3. Media, Penn.: Reformed Episcopal Publication Society, 1985. 27 p. N.B.: Place of publication also given as Philadelphia, Penn.; the approach to the issue is from an evangelical Anglican (Reformed Episcopal Church) orientation. Without ISBN
