= Gaudet Mater Ecclesia =

Gaudet Mater Ecclesia (Latin for "Mother Church Rejoices") is the title of Pope John XXIII's opening speech of the Second Vatican Council. Pope John "solemnly inaugurated" the council with this speech on October 11, 1962.

In the speech, addressed to "a vast assembly" of over 2000 bishops, he rejected the thoughts of "prophets of doom who are always forecasting disaster" in the world and in the future of the Church. He exhorted the Council Fathers "to make use of the medicine of mercy rather than the weapons of severity" in the documents they would produce for the council. In a personal reflection he notes that he conceived of holding the Council "almost suddenly" (quasi all’improvviso), referring back to the announcement of this intention in 1959, but the response of the Cardinals to his proposal had been supportive and the world at large demonstrated "enormous interest". The Pope then acknowledged the "intense" preparatory work which had been undertaken since the summer of 1959.

Gaudet Mater Ecclesia stated the purpose of the Second Vatican Council to be defending and presenting the sacred deposit of Christian doctrine:

The greatest concern of the Ecumenical Council is this, that the sacred deposit of Christian doctrine should be more effectively defended and presented.

The document previewed what Pope John Paul II would later call the new evangelization. In its relationship with the modern world, John declared that the Church "meets today’s needs by explaining the validity of her doctrine more fully rather than by condemning" the alternatives.

There is no "official" English translation of the speech.

== Marian references ==
The Feast of the Maternity of the Blessed Virgin Mary was celebrated on 11 October each year prior to the Council. The Pope invoked "the protection of the Virgin Mother of God", the "Help of Christians, Help of Bishops", over the proceedings of the Council.
