= Sola scriptura =

Protestant Christian theological doctrine

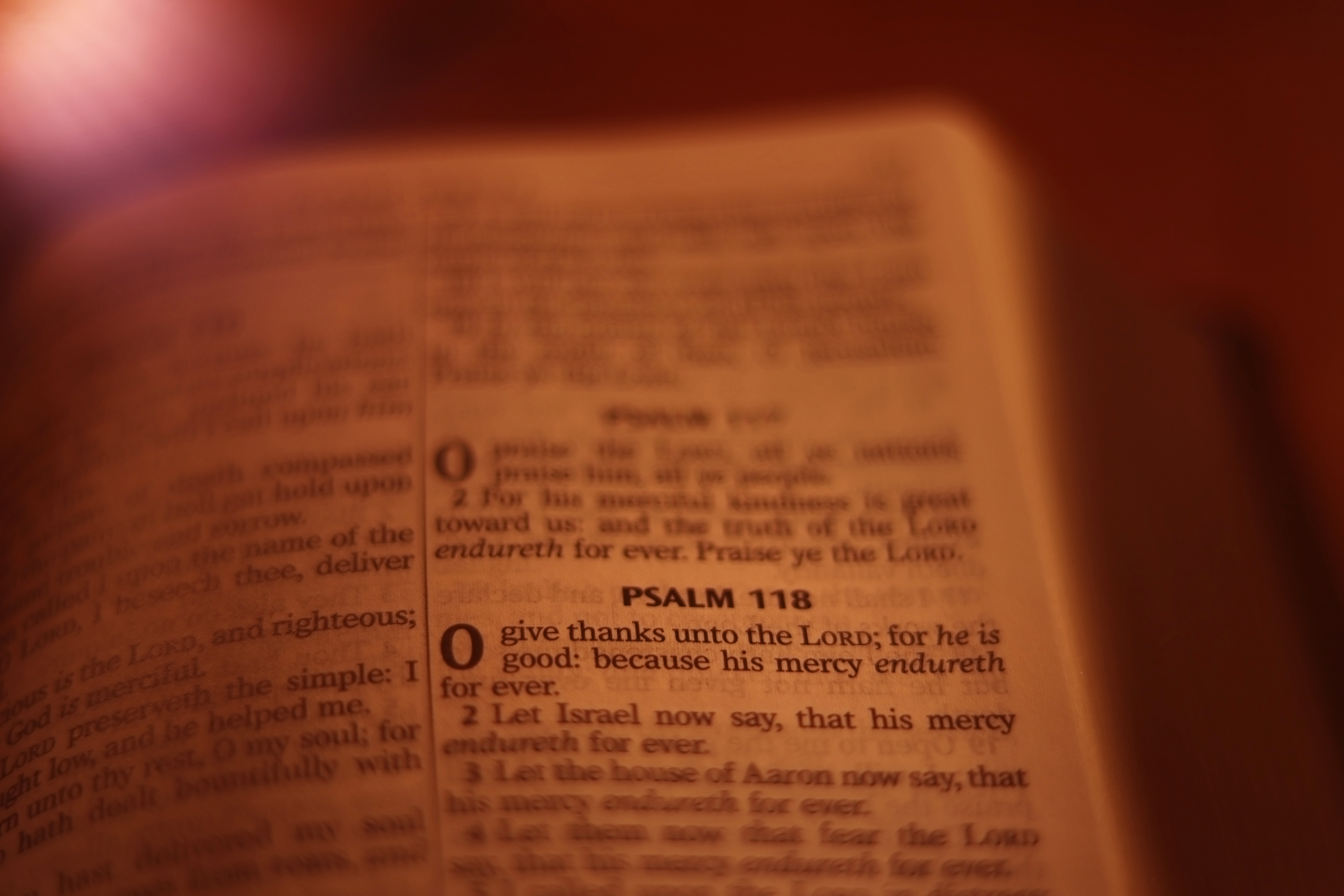
According to the doctrine of sola scriptura, Scripture is the only infallible authority for the Christian Church, due to its unique nature as a divinely inspired text.

Sola scriptura (Church Latin for 'by scripture alone') is a Christian theological doctrine held by most Protestant Christian denominations, in particular the Lutheran and Reformed traditions, that posits the Bible as the sole infallible source of authority for Christian faith and practice. Sola scriptura is a formal principle of many Protestant Christian denominations, and one of the five solae theorized in the early 20th Century, in attempts to characterize common ground in disparate Protestant theologies.

The Catholic Church and the Eastern Orthodox churches consider it heresy. While the scriptures' meaning is mediated through many kinds of subordinate authority—such as the ordinary teaching offices of a church, the ecumenical creeds, councils of the Catholic Church, or even personal special revelation—sola scriptura in contrast rejects any infallible authority other than the Bible.

It was a foundational doctrinal principle of the Protestant Reformation held by many of the Reformers, who taught that authentication of Scripture is governed by the discernible excellence of the text, as well as the personal witness of the Holy Spirit to the heart of each man.

By contrast, the Protestant traditions of Anglicanism, Methodism and Pentecostalism uphold the doctrine of prima scriptura, with scripture being illumined by tradition and reason. The Methodists thought reason should be delineated from experience, though the latter was classically filed under the former and guided by reason, nonetheless this was added, thus changing the "Anglican Stool" to the four sides of the Wesleyan Quadrilateral. The Eastern Orthodox Church holds that to "accept the books of the canon is also to accept the ongoing Spirit-led authority of the church's tradition, which recognizes, interprets, worships, and corrects itself by the witness of Holy Scripture". The Catholic Church officially regards tradition and scripture as equal, forming a single deposit, and considers the magisterium as the living organ which interprets said deposit. The Roman magisterium thus serves Tradition and Scripture as "one common source [...] with two distinct modes of transmission", while some Protestant authors call it "a dual source of revelation".

Many Protestants want to distinguish the view that scripture is the only rule of faith with the exclusion of other sources (nuda scriptura), from the view taught by Luther and Calvin that the scripture alone is infallible, without excluding church tradition in its entirety, viewing them as subordinate and ministerial.

== History ==
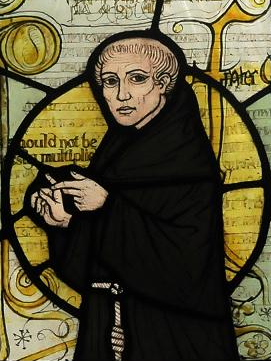
William of Ockham foreshadowed Luther's view of sola scriptura.

Augustine of Hippo is frequently cited by Protestants as a Church Father who espoused the doctrine of sola scriptura. The following is a passage in Augustine's letter (82) to Jerome, which is given as evidence for Augustine's adherence to the notion that Scripture is of a uniquely infallible authority in contrast to the writings of all other men. It is also noteworthy that Augustine attributes his view to Jerome.

I admit to your Charity that it is from those books alone of the Scriptures, which are now called canonical, that I have learned to pay them such honor and respect as to believe most firmly that not one of their authors has erred in writing anything at all. If I do find anything in those books which seems contrary to truth, I decide that either the text is corrupt, or the translator did not follow what was really said, or that I failed to understand it. But, when I read other authors, however eminent they may be in sanctity and learning, I do not necessarily believe a thing is true because they think so, but because they have been able to convince me, either on the authority of the canonical writers or by a probable reason which is not inconsistent with truth. And I think that you, my brother, feel the same way; moreover, I say, I do not believe that you want your books to be read as if they were those of Prophets or Apostles, about whose writings, free of all error, it is unlawful to doubt.

Protestants also argue that Augustine professes the sufficiency of Scripture in this sentence from On Christian Doctrine, "among the things that are plainly laid down in Scripture are to be found all matters that concern faith and the manner of life".

In the 14th century, Marsilius of Padua (Note: Rendered in Latin: Marsiglius; and in Italian: Marsilio da Padova) believed that the only authority for a Christian is the scriptures, instead of the pope. The same point was made by John Wycliffe who foreshadowed the sola scriptura doctrine in the 14th century.

Johann Ruchrat von Wesel, Wessel Gansfort and Johannes von Goch also foreshadowed (Note: Schaff describes these earlier theologians as "reformers before the Reformation", and says of Wesel, for instance: John Ruchrath von Wesel, d. 1481, attacked the hierarchy and indulgences and was charged on his trial with calling in question almost all the distinctive Roman Catholic tenets. ... In 1479, Wesel was arraigned for heresy before the Inquisition at Mainz. Among the charges were that the Scriptures are alone a trustworthy source of authority; — Philip Schaff, "Doctrinal Reformers", History of the Christian Church: The Middle Ages, A.D. 1294–1517) the Protestant view of sola scriptura: they viewed the scripture as being the only infallible authority and denied the authority of the pope or the church as infallible. Peter Abelard believed that human reason was a means of understanding the scriptures, instead of submitting to everything the Catholic Church defines.

Some elements of sola-scriptura are also foreshadowed by William of Ockham and Girolamo Savonarola.

== Overview ==
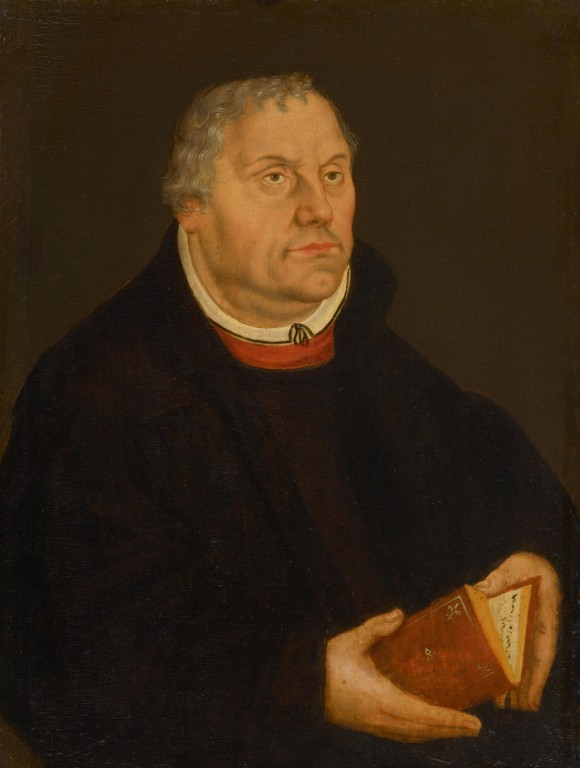
Sola scriptura was one of the main theological beliefs that Martin Luther proclaimed against the Catholic Church during the Protestant Reformation.

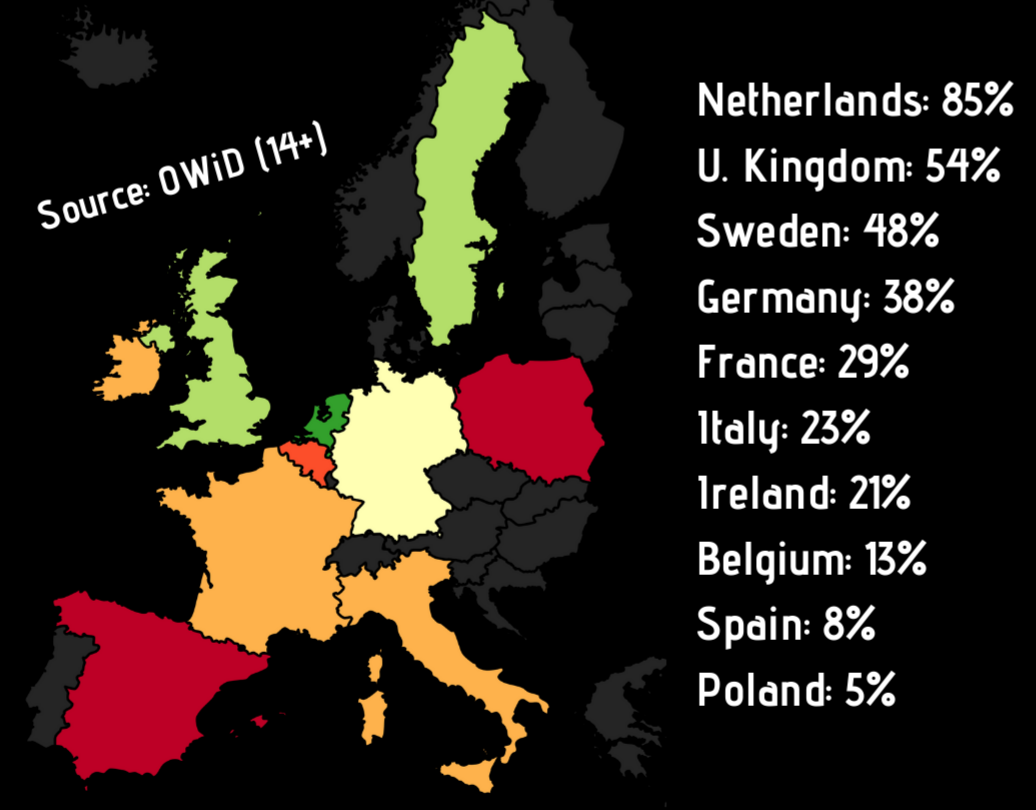
Literacy rate in Europe (1750)

Sola scriptura is one of the five solae, considered by some Protestant groups to be the theological pillars of the Reformation. The key implication of the principle is that interpretations and applications of the scriptures don't have the same authority as the scriptures themselves; hence, the authority of the church is viewed as subject to correction by the scriptures, even by an individual member of the church.

Martin Luther, 16th-century friar and figurehead of the Protestant Reformation, stated that "a simple layman armed with Scripture is greater than the mightiest pope without it". The intention of the Reformation was thus to correct what he asserted to be the errors of the Catholic Church, by appealing to the uniqueness of the Bible's textual authority. Catholic doctrine is based on sacred tradition, as well as scripture. Sola scriptura rejected the assertion that infallible authority was given to the magisterium to interpret both Scripture and tradition.

Protestants, in their defense say that Sola scriptura does not ignore Christian history, tradition, or the church when seeking to understand the Bible. Rather, it sees the church as the Bible's interpreter, the "rule of faith" (regula fidei) embodied in the ecumenical creeds as the interpretive context, and scripture as the only final authority in matters of faith and practice. As Luther said, "The true rule is this: God's Word shall establish articles of faith, and no one else, not even an angel can do so."

=== Literacy ===
Sola scriptura was the main driver of the rise of literacy in Northwestern Europe, including female literacy. Luther emphasized the need for parents to ensure their children's literacy, as well as the obligation for governments to create schools. The Prussian education system was among the first in the world to introduce tax-funded and generally compulsory primary education.

== Protestantism ==
=== Lutheranism ===
Lutheranism teaches that the books of the Old and New Testaments are the only divinely inspired books and the only source of divinely revealed knowledge. (Note: For the traditional Lutheran view of the Bible, see Graebner 1910, pp. 3ff. For an overview of the doctrine of verbal inspiration in Lutheranism, see Lueker, Poellot & Jackson 2000b.) Scripture alone is the formal principle of the faith in Lutheranism, the final authority for all matters of faith and morals because of its inspiration, authority, clarity, efficacy, and sufficiency.

==== Inspiration ====
Lutheranism teaches that the Bible does not merely contain the Word of God, but every word of it is, because of verbal inspiration, the word of God. Most Lutheran traditions acknowledge that understanding scriptures is complex given that the Bible contains a collection of manuscripts and manuscript fragments that were written and collected over thousands of years. For example, the Evangelical Lutheran Church in America teaches that "Lutheran Christians believe that the story of God's steadfast love and mercy in Jesus is the heart and center of what the Scriptures have to say."

As Lutherans confess in the Nicene Creed, the Holy Spirit "spoke through the prophets". The Apology of the Augsburg Confession identifies "Holy Scripture" with the Word of God and calls the Holy Spirit the author of the Bible. Because of this, Lutherans confess in the Formula of Concord, "we receive and embrace with our whole heart the prophetic and apostolic Scriptures of the Old and New Testaments as the pure, clear fountain of Israel".

The prophetic and apostolic Scriptures are said by the Lutheran church to be authentic as written by the prophets and apostles, and that a correct translation of their writings is God's Word because it has the same meaning as the original Biblical Hebrew and Koine Greek. A mistranslation is not God's word, and no human authority can invest it with divine authority.

===== Composition and authority =====
For early Lutherans, sola scriptura did not mean that all books of the Bible are equal: there is an authoritative first-class subset for dogma: this has been called "the canon within the canon."

"I saw another angel fly in the midst of heaven, having the everlasting gospel to preach..." This illustration is from the title page of Luther's Bible.

The phrase "prophetic and apostolic" serves to exclude as sources of dogma those (canonical) biblical books which do not directly deal with Christ or the Gospel: this may not only exclude the Old Testament Deuterocanonicals but the New Testament antilegomena such as Hebrews, James, 2 Peter, 2 & 3 John, Jude and Revelation.

Early Lutherans used "apostolic" in what has been called a theological rather than historical sense: Luther wrote "what preaches Christ would be apostolic". At one stage of Luther's developing opinion, he rejected the Epistle of James as a foundation of the faith and held that the Book of Revelation was neither prophetic nor apostolic in his terms.

Luther's followers to an extent restored the historical link between authority and canonicity by appealing to ideas of New Testament antilegomena to favour those books deemed to have initially been accepted by all the early churches. Martin Chemnitz listed the first-class books of the Old and New Testament: for Chemnitz "no dogma ought therefore to be drawn out of these books (the antilegomena) which does not have reliable and clear foundations and testimonies in other canonical books. Nothing controversial can be proved out of these books, unless there are other proofs and confirmations in the canonical books," which moderates or contradicts Luther's general hermeneutic principle "scripture interprets scripture." However, Chemnitz himself had to use antilegomena to justify some anti-Roman positions.

By the early 20th century, Lutheran theologian J.P. Koehler taught that a statement of the homologoumena must not be restricted by a statement taken from the antilegomena. However, conventionally many Lutheran theologians hold that there is no statement in the former that actually contradicts the latter, as a matter of logical necessity or actual examination, making the idea of a canon-within-the-canon moot: Catholic theologians have disputed this. Another contemporary theologian August Pieper wrote that the Lutheran church "wisely failed to determine formally the extent of the New Testament canon" in the sense of not explicitly formalizing the canon-within-the-canon.

According to Lutheran scholars, the so-called apocryphal books of the Old Testament were not written by the prophets, nor by inspiration; they contain errors, were never included in the Palestinian Canon that Jesus was theorized (before the discovery of the Dead Sea Scrolls) to use, and therefore are not a part of scripture.

==== Divine authority ====
Scripture, regarded as the word of God, carries the full authority of God in Lutheranism: every single statement of the Bible calls for instant, unqualified and unrestricted acceptance. Every doctrine of the Bible is the teaching of God and therefore requires full agreement. Every promise of the Bible calls for unshakable trust in its fulfillment; every command of the Bible is the directive of God himself and therefore demands willing observance.

What is said here of "every statement of the Bible" does not represent the faith of all Lutherans: a 2001 survey showed that 72 percent of members of the Evangelical Lutheran Church in America do not accept that everything in the Bible is literal, but that it may contain scientific or historical errors or describe events symbolically.

==== Clarity ====
Lutheranism teaches that the Bible presents all doctrines and commands of the Christian faith clearly; that God's word is freely accessible to every reader or hearer of ordinary intelligence, without requiring any special education. It also teaches that readers must understand the language God's word is presented in, and not be so preoccupied by contrary thoughts so as to prevent understanding. It teaches that, consequently, no one needs to wait for any clergy, and pope, scholar, or ecumenical council to explain the real meaning of any part of the Bible.

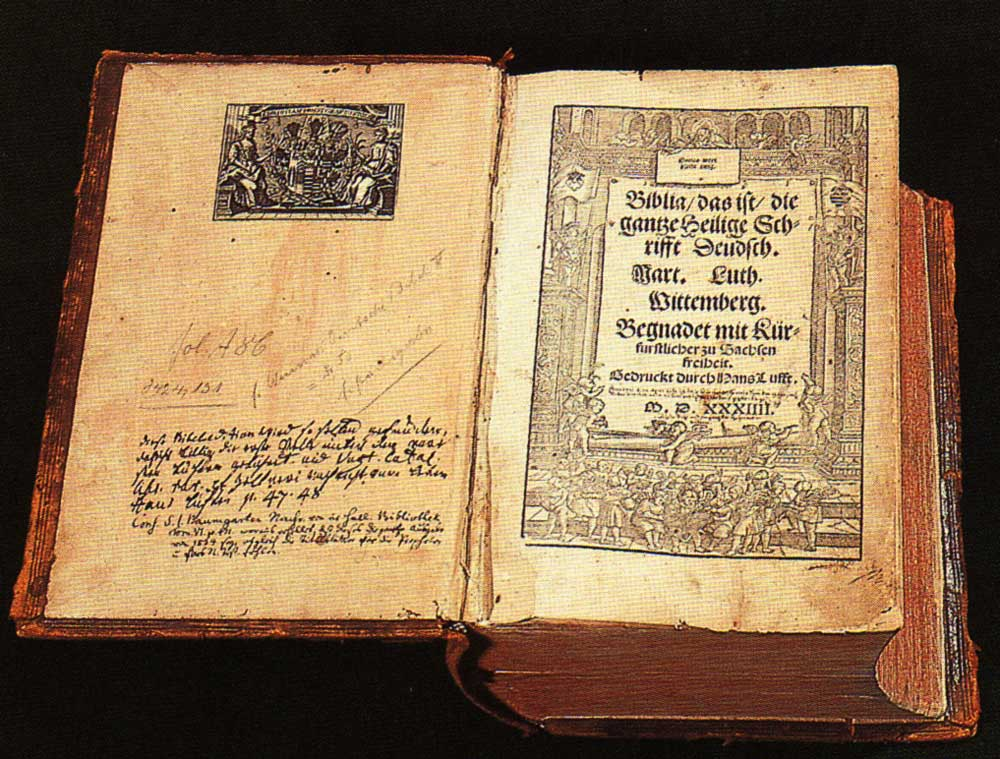
Luther's translation of the Bible, from 1534, with four books placed after those Luther, considered, "the true and certain chief books of the New Testament"

==== Efficacy ====
Lutheranism teaches that scripture is united with the power of the Holy Spirit and with it, not only demands but also creates the acceptance of its teaching. This teaching produces faith and obedience. Scripture is not a dead letter, but rather, the power of the Holy Spirit is inherent in it. Scripture does not compel a mere intellectual assent to its doctrine, resting on logical argumentation, but rather it creates the living agreement of faith. The Smalcald Articles affirm, "in those things which concern the spoken, outward Word, we must firmly hold that God grants His Spirit or grace to no one, except through or with the preceding outward Word".

==== Sufficiency ====
Lutheranism teaches that the Bible contains everything that one needs to know in order to obtain salvation and to live a Christian life. In this view, there are no deficiencies in scripture which need to be filled by tradition, pronouncements of the Pope, new revelations, or present-day development of doctrine.

=== Reformed faith (Calvinism) ===
Sola scriptura in the Reformed faith possesses the same characteristics to those of Lutheranism: inspiration, authority, clarity, efficacy, and sufficiency.

Article 3 of the Belgic Confession, a Reformed confessional of faith, teaches the divine inspiration of Scripture, "We confess that this Word of God was not sent nor delivered by the will of man, but that holy men of God spake as they were moved by the Holy Ghost, as the apostle Peter saith (2 Peter 1:21)."

Article 7 teaches the sole infallibility or unique authority of Scripture, "Neither do we consider of equal value any writing of men, however holy these men may have been, with those divine Scriptures; nor ought we to consider custom, or the great multitude, or antiquity, or succession of times and persons, or councils, decrees or statutes, as of equal value with the truth of God".

Chapter 1.7 of Westminster Confession of Faith, another authoritative Reformed confession, speaks of the use of "ordinary means" (such as turning to pastors and teachers) for reaching an understanding of what is contained in scripture and what is necessary to know, while still espousing the doctrine of the clarity or perspicuity of Scripture; "All things in Scripture are not alike plain in themselves, nor alike clear unto all, yet those things which are necessary to be known, believed, and observed for salvation, are so clearly propounded, and opened in some place of Scripture or other, that not only the learned, but the unlearned, in a due use of the ordinary means, may attain unto a sufficient understanding of them".

In the same chapter, "efficacy" is ascribed to the doctrine of Scripture.

The sufficiency of Scripture is also taught in Article 7 of the Belgic Confession, "We believe that those Holy Scriptures fully contain the will of God, and that whatsoever man ought to believe unto salvation is sufficiently taught therein."

=== Nuda scriptura (Fundamentalist Evangelicals, etc.) ===
The view that scripture is the only rule of faith to the total exclusion of all other sources, even non-infallible or less authoritative ones such as historical or patristic evidence. (Sometimes called solo scriptura.)

Sola scriptura does not teach that the Bible is the only book that matters, and all other books would be worthless.

== Alternatives ==
=== Prima scriptura (Anglicanism, Methodism) ===
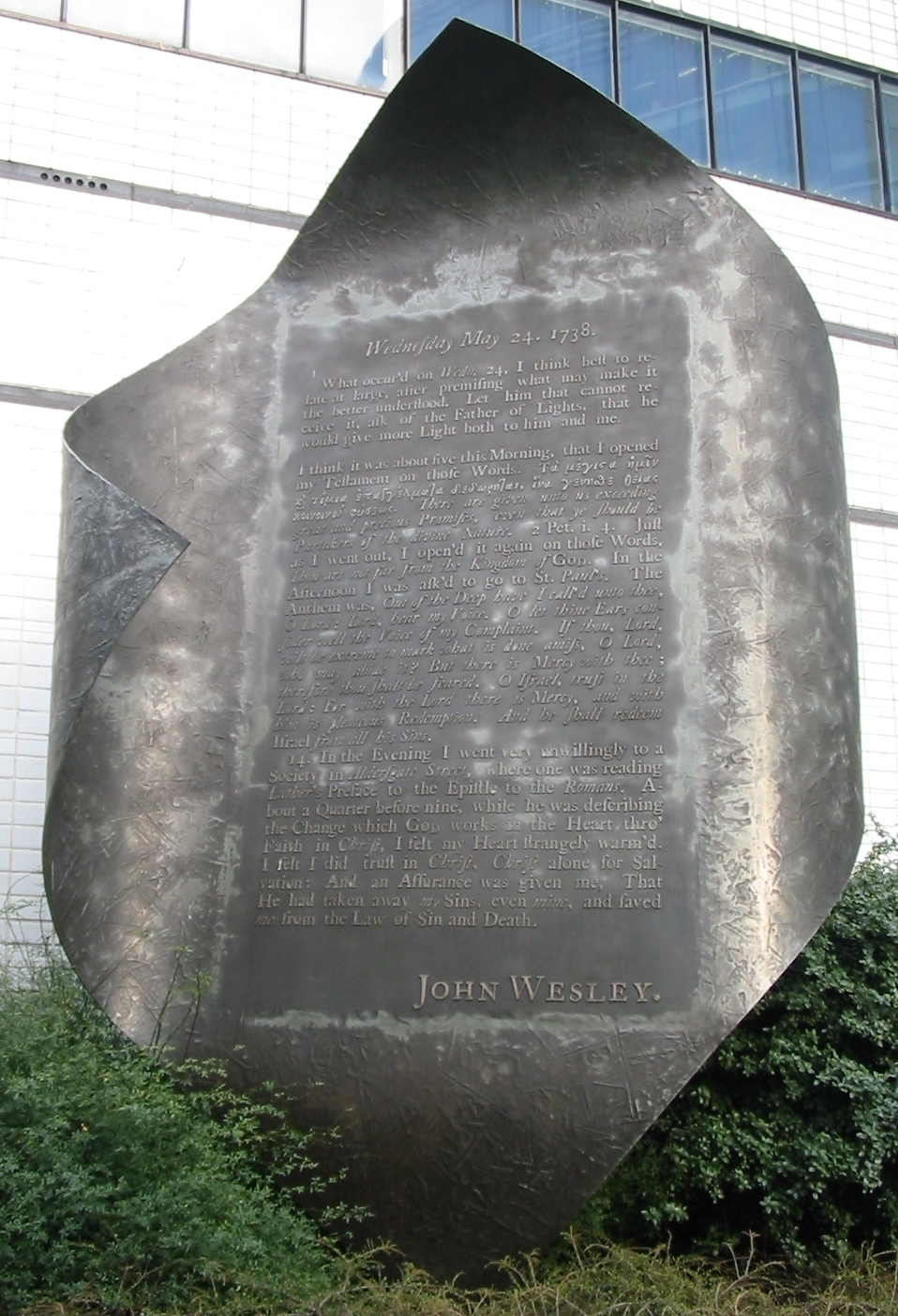
In the Wesleyan Quadrilateral, experience is an additional source of authority. Pictured is a memorial to John Wesley's own experience of the New Birth and Assurance.

Sola scriptura may be contrasted with prima scriptura, which holds that, besides canonical scripture, there are other guides for what a believer should believe, and how he or she should live. Examples of this include the general revelation in creation, traditions, charismatic gifts, mystical insight, angelic visitations, conscience, common sense, the views of experts, the spirit of the times or something else. Prima scriptura suggests that ways of knowing or understanding God and his will, that do not originate from canonized scripture, are in a second place, perhaps helpful in interpreting that scripture, but testable by the canon and correctable by it, if they seem to contradict the scriptures.

Two Christian denominations that uphold the position of prima scriptura are Anglicanism and Methodism. (Note: On the Anglican view of authority, Richard H. Schmidt wrote: A favorite, if overworked, image among Anglicans is that of the three-legged stool, which stands only when all three legs are in place, as a visual way to think of the Anglican view of authority. We acknowledge three sources of authority, and we manage not to fall down when all three are in place. The first and most important of these is the Bible. The Articles of Religion, a Reformation-era statement of Anglican views on questions of the day, says that the Bible "containeth all things necessary to salvation", so that nothing not found in the Bible is to be required as an article of faith.) In the Anglican tradition, scripture, tradition, and reason form the "Anglican triad" or "three-legged stool", formulated by the Anglican theologian Richard Hooker. With respect to the Methodist tradition, A Dictionary for United Methodists states:

Building on the Anglican theological tradition, Wesley added a fourth emphasis, experience. The resulting four components or "sides" of the [Wesleyan] quadrilateral are (1) Scripture, (2) tradition, (3) reason, and (4) experience. For United Methodists, Scripture is considered the primary source and standard for Christian doctrine. Tradition is experience and the witness of development and growth of the faith through the past centuries and in many nations and cultures. Experience is the individual's understanding and appropriating of the faith in the light of his or her own life. Through reason the individual Christian brings to bear on the Christian faith discerning and cogent thought. These four elements taken together bring the individual Christian to a mature and fulfilling understanding of the Christian faith and the required response of worship and service.

Sola scriptura rejects any original infallible authority, other than the Bible. In this view, all secondary authority is derived from the authority of the scriptures and is therefore subject to reform when compared to the teaching of the Bible. Church councils, preachers, biblical commentators, private revelation, or even a message allegedly from an angel or an apostle are not an original authority alongside the Bible in the sola scriptura approach.

=== Scripture in sacred tradition (Catholicism, Eastern Orthodoxy) ===
For the Eastern Orthodox, "the Holy Bible forms a part of Holy Tradition, but does not lie outside of it. One would be in error to suppose that Scripture and Tradition are two separate and distinct sources of Christian Faith, as some do, since there is, in reality, only one source; and the Holy Bible exists and found its formulation within Tradition".

The Tradition here in question comes from the apostles and hands on what they received from Jesus' teaching and example and what they learned from the Holy Spirit. As explained by Athanasius of Alexandria, "Let us look at the very tradition, teaching, and faith of the Catholic Church from the very beginning, which the Logos gave (edoken), the Apostles preached (ekeryxan), and the Fathers preserved (ephylaxan). Upon this the Church is founded (tethemeliotai)" (St. Athanasius, "First Letter to Serapion", 28).

The Catholic Church has not seen Scripture and the Sacred Tradition of the faith as different sources of authority, but that Scripture was handed down as part of Sacred Tradition (see 2 Thessalonians 2:15, 2 Timothy 2:2). (The Catholic Church distinguishes Sacred Tradition from lesser ecclesiastical traditions—local customs that may be retained, modified or even abandoned.)

The Catholic Church holds that the Gospel was transmitted by the apostles by their oral preaching, by example, and by observances handed on what they had received from the lips of Christ, from living with Him, and from what He did, or what they had learned through the prompting of the Holy Spirit; as well as by those apostles and apostolic men who under the inspiration of the Holy Spirit committed the message of salvation to writing. "This living transmission, accomplished in the Holy Spirit, is called Tradition, since it is distinct from Sacred Scripture, though closely connected to it." "Sacred Tradition and Sacred Scripture make up a single sacred deposit of the Word of God."

The doctrines which constitute Sacred Tradition are also perceived by the Church as cohesive in nature. The proper interpretation of the Scriptures was seen as part of the faith of the Church and seen indeed as the manner in which biblical authority was upheld (see Book of Acts 15:28–29). The meaning of Scripture was seen as proven from the faith universally held in the churches (see Phil. 2:1, Acts 4:32), and the correctness of that universal faith was seen as proven from the Scriptures and apostolic Sacred Tradition (see 2 Thes. 2:15, 2 Thes. 3:6, 1 Corinthians 11:2). The Biblical canon itself was thus viewed by the Church as part of the Church's tradition, as defined by its leadership and acknowledged by its laity. The first generation of Christians did not yet have a written New Testament, and the New Testament itself demonstrates the process of living Tradition.

The Catholic Dei verbum and the papal encyclicals Providentissimus Deus by Pope Leo XIII and Divino afflante Spiritu by Pope Pius XII set out Catholic teaching on tradition versus individual interpretation.

==== Apostolic tradition ====
Catholics apply to apostolic tradition many of the qualities that many Protestants apply to scripture alone. For example, the 1978 Evangelical declaration Chicago Statement on Biblical Inerrancy, states: "We affirm that inspiration was the work in which God by His Spirit, through human writers, gave us His Word. The origin of Scripture is divine. The mode of divine inspiration remains largely a mystery to us. We deny that inspiration can be reduced to human insight, or to heightened states of consciousness of any kind."

Since the Catholic Church professes that apostolic tradition and scripture are both the word of God, Catholics can affirm that many of these propositions apply equally well to tradition: It is the work of the Holy Spirit, which cannot be reduced to human insight or heightened consciousness.

This ties in with the question of what constitutes apostolic tradition. The Catechism of the Catholic Church states that this tradition is given "by the apostles who handed on, by the spoken word of their preaching, by the example they gave, by the institutions they established, what they themselves had received – whether from the lips of Christ, from his way of life and his works, or whether they had learned it at the prompting of the Holy Spirit".

There is a distinction between apostolic tradition, which in the Catholic view does not change (but needs elucidation), and theology, such as moral theology and doctrine, which develops. According to Catholic academic and judge John T. Noonan Jr. "history cannot leave a principle or a teaching untouched; every application to a situation affects our understanding of the principle itself."

=== Additional Scriptures (Church of Jesus Christ of Latter-day Saints) ===
The Church of Jesus Christ of Latter-day Saints (LDS Church) states: "The official, canonized scriptures of the Church, often called the standard works, are the Bible, the Book of Mormon, the Doctrine and Covenants, and the Pearl of Great Price." The Church accepts the Bible as the word of God "as far as it is translated correctly," and it regards parts of the Apocrypha, some writings of the Protestant Reformers and non-Christian religious leaders, and the non-religious writings of some philosophers – and, notably, the Constitution of the United States of America – to be inspired, though not canonical.

Regarding the Church's view on the belief held by many that the Holy Bible, as presently constituted (in any translation, or even from the extant Hebrew and Greek manuscripts), is inerrant or infallible, etc, or the doctrine of sola scriptura, the Church has said the following: "The Latter-day Saints have a great reverence and love for the Bible. They study it and try to live its teachings. They treasure its witness of the life and mission of the Lord Jesus Christ. The Prophet Joseph Smith studied the Bible all his life, and he taught its precepts. He testified that a person who can 'mark the power of Omnipotence, inscribed upon the heavens, can also see God's own handwriting in the sacred volume: and he who reads it oftenest will like it best, and he who is acquainted with it, will know the hand [of the Lord] wherever he can see it'."

The Church further said on the subject of sola scriptura: "Latter-day Saints believe in an open scriptural canon, which means that there are other books of scripture besides the Bible (such as the Book of Mormon) and that God continues to reveal His word through living prophets. The argument is often made that to be a Christian means to assent to the principle of sola scriptura, or the self-sufficiency of the Bible. But to claim that the Bible is the final word of God—more specifically, the final written word of God—is to claim more for the Bible than it claims for itself. Nowhere does the Bible proclaim that all revelations from God would be gathered into a single volume to be forever closed and that no further scriptural revelation could be received."

== Critiques ==
=== Catholic ===
Following the Protestant churches' separation from the Catholic Church, the relatively new idea of sola scriptura came under serious critique by the Catholic theologians.

==== Self-contradictory ====
The American Roman Catholic author and television presenter Patrick Madrid wrote that sola scriptura is self-referentially incoherent, as the Bible itself does not teach sola scriptura, and therefore the belief that the scriptures are the only source of Christian belief is self-contradicting given that it cannot be supported without extra-scriptural doctrine.

==== Uncertain ====
In the 2008 book Catholicism and Science, the authors Peter M. J. Hess and Paul Allen wrote that sola scriptura is "inherently divisive", citing the Marburg Colloquy where Martin Luther and Huldrych Zwingli debated the real presence of Christ in the Eucharist on scriptural grounds but were unable to reach agreement on sacramental union. Hess and Allen argue that, when scripture is seen as the only source of infallible teaching, its interpretation is subject to fallible interpretation, and without an infallible interpreter, a certainty of Christian belief is not possible.

==== Requires external authority ====
The Roman Catholic Encyclopedia of Theology notes that, since the 27 books that make up the New Testament canon of scripture are not based on a scriptural list that authenticates them to be inspired, their legitimacy would be impossible to distinguish with certainty without appealing to another infallible source, such as the magisterium of the Catholic Church, which assembled and authenticated this list at Synod of Rome and the Synod of Carthage, both of which took place in the fourth century. Before this, a compiled and authenticated Bible as it is now known did not yet exist.

==== Unscriptural ====
The American Roman Catholic writer Dave Armstrong wrote that there are several examples of Jesus and his Apostles accepting oral and extrabiblical tradition in the New Testament:

- The reference to "He shall be called a Nazarene" cannot be found in the Old Testament, yet it was "spoken by the prophets" (Matthew 2:23). This prophecy, which is considered to be "God's Word", was passed down orally rather than through Scripture.
- In Matthew 23:2–3, Jesus teaches that the scribes and Pharisees have a legitimate, binding authority based "on Moses' seat", but this phrase or idea cannot be found anywhere in the Old Testament. It is found in the (originally oral) Mishnah, which teaches a sort of "teaching succession" from Moses.
- In 1 Corinthians 10:4, Paul the Apostle refers to a rock that "followed" the Jews through the Sinai wilderness. The Old Testament says nothing about such miraculous movement. But, this critic writes, rabbinic tradition does.
- "As Jannes and Jambres opposed Moses" (2 Timothy 3:8). These two men cannot be found in the related Old Testament passage (cf. Exodus 7:8ff.) or anywhere else in the Old Testament.
- In the Epistle of Jude 9, a dispute is mentioned between the Archangel Michael and Satan over Moses' body, which is not mentioned elsewhere in the Bible, and is drawn from oral Jewish tradition.
- In the 2 Thessalonians 2:15, Paul the Apostle writes, "Therefore, dear brothers, hold fast to and stand firm in the traditions which you were taught by us either by word or by epistle." This seems that the Bible is not the sole source of authority. (compare NRSV, NASB, etc).
- In the Epistle of James 5:17, when recounting the prayers of Elijah described in 1 Kings 17, a lack of rain for three years is mentioned, which is absent from the passage in 1 Kings.

Armstrong argues that since Jesus and the Apostles acknowledge authoritative Jewish oral tradition, Christians can therefore not dispute oral tradition's legitimacy and authority. However, according to scripture, Jesus also challenges some man-made Jewish traditions. But Catholics also make a similar distinction today between Sacred Tradition, which is considered inerrant, and lesser ecclesiastical traditions or disciplines, which can be subject to change. In the Catholic view, one can know what belongs to Sacred Tradition and what is an ecclesiastical tradition or discipline by consulting the Magisterium of the Church. The difference between the two, in the Catholic view, is that Sacred Tradition is apostolic and part of the deposit of faith, while ecclesiastical traditions and disciplines are not.

== See also ==
- Biblical criticism
- Bibliolatry
- Cessationism versus continuationism
- Christian fundamentalism
- Ex cathedra
- Ibrahim al-Nazzam
- Ijtihad
- Karaite Judaism (an analogous position in Judaism)
- King James Only movement
- Quranism (an analogous position in Islam)
