= Wesleyan Quadrilateral =

Methodology for theological reflection that is credited to John Wesley

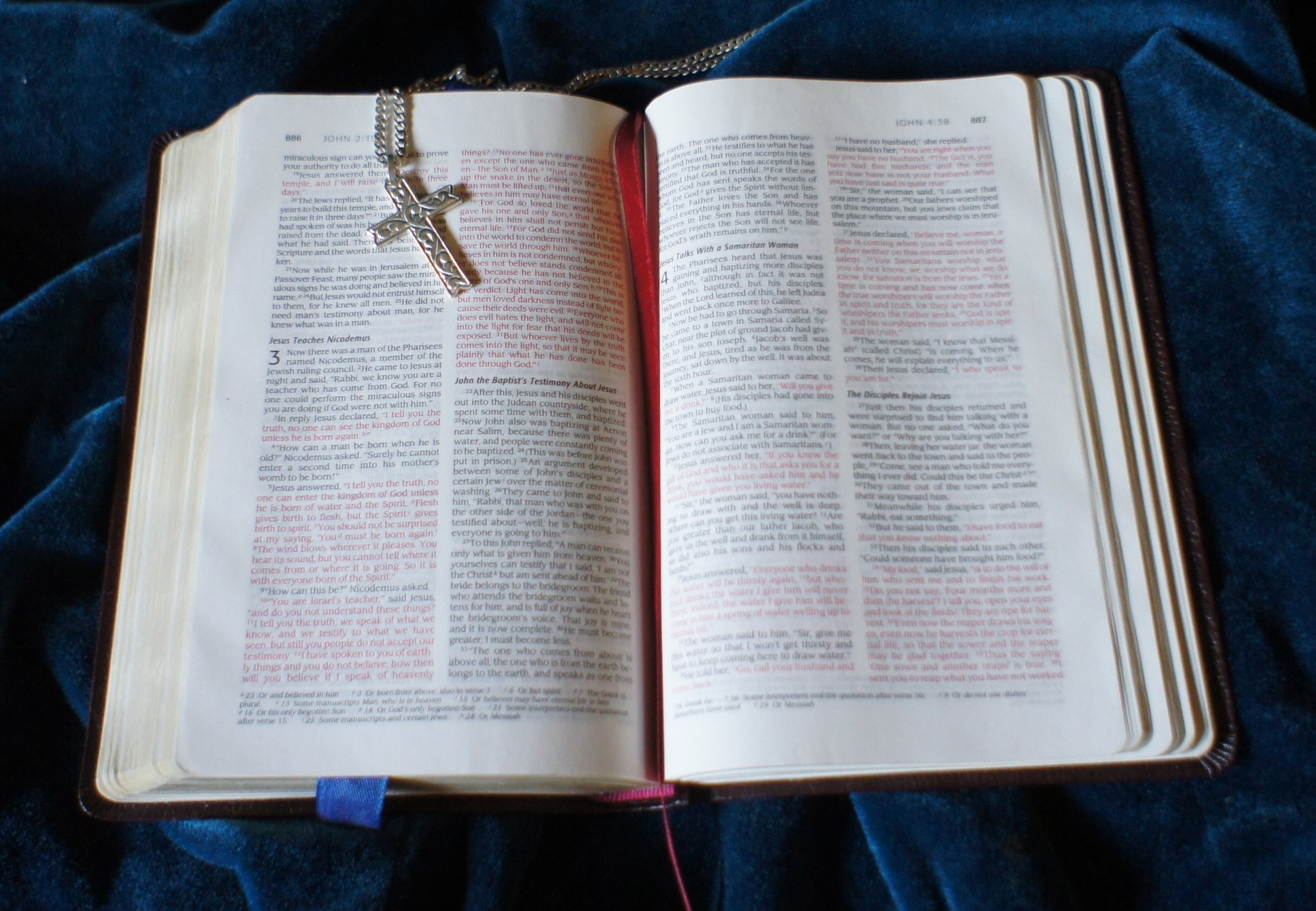
Scripture is the primary source of theological authority in the Quadrilateral.

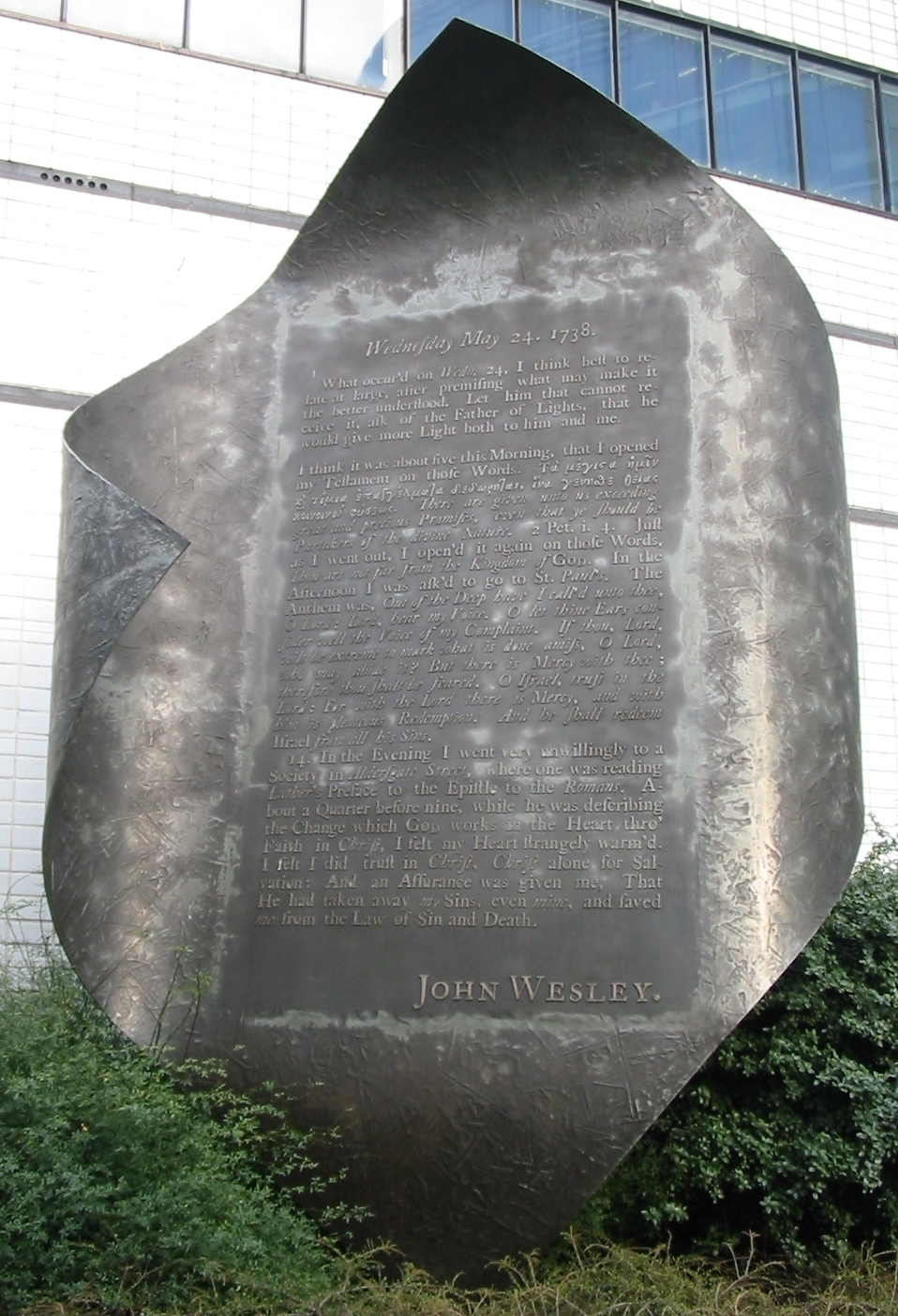
Personal experience is an additional source of authority. Pictured is a memorial to Wesley's conversion and experience of assurance.

The Wesleyan Quadrilateral, or Methodist Quadrilateral, is a methodology for theological reflection that is credited to John Wesley, leader of the Methodist movement in the late 18th century. The term itself was coined by 20th century American Methodist scholar Albert C. Outler.

The Wesleyan Quadrilateral explicates the Methodist belief of prima scriptura. This method bases its teaching on four sources as the basis of theological and doctrinal development. These four sources are chiefly scripture, along with tradition, reason, and Christian experience.

== Description ==
Upon examination of Wesley's work, Albert Outler theorized that Wesley used four different sources in coming to theological conclusions. Wesley believed, first of all, that the living core of the Christian faith was revealed in "scripture" as the sole foundational source. The centrality of scripture was so important for Wesley that he called himself "a man of one book". However, doctrine had to be in keeping with Christian orthodox "tradition". Thus, tradition became, in his view, the second aspect of the so-called Quadrilateral. Furthermore, Wesley believed that faith is more than merely an acknowledgment of ideas. Thus, as a practical theologian, he contended that part of the theological method would involve "experiential" faith. In other words, truth should be vivified in the personal experience of Christians (overall, not individually). Finally, every doctrine must be able to be defended "rationally". He did not divorce faith from reason. Tradition, experience, and reason, however, are always subject to Scripture, which is primary.

=== Outline ===
Scripture
Wesley insisted that scripture is the first authority and contains the only measure by which all other truth is tested. It was delivered by authors who were divinely inspired. It is a rule sufficient of itself. It neither needs nor is capable of any further addition. The scripture references to justification by faith as the gateway to scriptural holiness are: Deut. 30:6; Ps. 130:8; Ezek. 36:25, 29; Matt. 5:48; 22:37; Luke 1:69; John 17:20–23; Rom. 8:3–4; II Cor. 7:1; Eph. 3:14; 5:25–27; I Thess. 5:23; Titus 2:11–14; I John 3:8; 4:17.

Tradition
Wesley wrote that it is generally supposed that traditional evidence is weakened by length of time, as it must necessarily pass through so many hands in a continued succession of ages. Although other evidence is perhaps more substantial, he insisted: "Do not undervalue traditional evidence. Let it have its place and its due honour. It is highly serviceable in its kind, and in its degree". Wesley states that those of strong and clear understanding should be aware of its full force. For him, it supplies a link through 1,700 years of history with Jesus and the apostles. The witness to justification and sanctification is an unbroken chain that draws us into fellowship with those who have finished the race, fought the fight, and now reign with God in his glory and might.

Reason
Although scripture is sufficient unto itself and is the foundation of true religion, Wesley wrote: "Now, of what excellent use is reason, if we would either understand ourselves, or explain to others, those living oracles". He states quite clearly that without reason we cannot understand the essential truths of Scripture. Reason, however, is not a mere human invention. It must be assisted by the Holy Spirit if we are to understand the mysteries of God. Concerning justification by faith and sanctification, Wesley said that although reason cannot produce faith, when impartial reason speaks, we can understand the new birth, inward holiness, and outward holiness.

Experience
Apart from scripture, experience is the most substantial proof of Christianity. "What the scriptures promise, I enjoy". Again, Wesley insisted that we cannot have reasonable assurance of something unless we have experienced it personally. John Wesley was assured of both justification and sanctification because he had experienced them in his own life. What Christianity promised (considered as a doctrine) was accomplished in his soul. Furthermore, Christianity (considered as an inward principle) is the completion of all those promises. Although traditional proof is complex, experience is simple: "One thing I know; I was blind, but now I see." Although tradition establishes the evidence a long way off, experience makes it present to all persons. As for the proof of justification and sanctification, Wesley states that Christianity is an experience of holiness and happiness, the image of God impressed on a created spirit, a fountain of peace and love springing up into everlasting life.

== Application ==
The Wesleyan Quadrilateral is taught in various Methodist connections. The United Methodist Church asserts that "Wesley believed that the living core of the Christian faith was revealed in Scripture, illumined by tradition, vivified in personal experience, and confirmed by reason. Scripture [however] is primary, revealing the Word of God 'so far as it is necessary for our salvation.'" The Free Methodist Church teaches:

In the Free Methodist church, we believe all truth is God's truth. If something is true, we embrace it as from the Lord. First and foremost, we hold Scripture up to be the primary source of God's inspired revealed truth to us. And, we also embrace truth that is found in three other places: reason, tradition, and experience. Along with scripture, this has come to be called the Wesleyan Quadrilateral and we believe it informs our theology.

Wesley saw his four sources of authority not merely as prescriptive of how one should form one's theology, but also as descriptive of how almost anyone does form theology. As an astute observer of human behavior and a pragmatist, Wesley's approach to the Quadrilateral was most certainly phenomenological, describing practically how things work in actual human experience. Thus, when Wesley speaks of "Tradition", he does not merely refer to ancient Church Tradition and the writings of the great theologians and Church Fathers of days past, but also to the immediate and present theological influences which contribute to a person's understanding of God and of Christian theology. "Tradition" may encompass influences such as the beliefs, values, and teachings of one's family and upbringing. It may also include the various beliefs and values that one encounters and that affect one's understanding of Scripture.

In United Methodist understanding, both laypeople and clergy alike share in "our theological task." The theological task is the ongoing effort to live as Christians amid the complexities of a secular world. Wesley's Quadrilateral is referred to in Methodism as "our theological guidelines". It is taught to its pastors in the seminary as the primary approach to interpreting Scripture and gaining guidance for moral questions and dilemmas faced in daily life.

== See also ==
- Wesleyan theology
- Articles of Religion (Methodist)
