= Deposit of faith =

Body of revealed truth in Bible and sacred tradition

The deposit of faith (Latin: depositum fidei or fidei depositum) is the body of revealed truth in the scriptures and sacred tradition proposed by the Catholic Church for the belief and salvation of its members. The phrase has a similar use in the U.S. Episcopal Church.

== Catholic usage ==
The "sacred deposit" of the faith (depositum fidei) refers to the teachings of the Catholic Church which are believed to be handed down since the time of the Apostles – namely scripture and sacred tradition. St. Paul uses the Greek word paratheke ("deposit") in 1 Timothy 6:20: "O Timothy, guard what has been entrusted to you"; and again in 2 Timothy 1:14 "Guard this rich trust with the help of the holy Spirit that dwells within us" (NAB).

Pope John XXIII referred to "the deposit of faith" (il deposito della Fede) in his opening speech at the Second Vatican Council. According to Dei Verbum, the Council's Dogmatic Constitution on Divine Revelation, "Sacred tradition and Sacred Scripture form one sacred deposit of the word of God, committed to the Church, [...] both of them, flowing from the same divine wellspring, in a certain way merge into a unity and tend toward the same end."

They are interpreted and transmitted through the magisterium, the teaching authority of the Catholic Church, which is entrusted to the pope and to the bishops in communion with him. On the occasion of the publication of the Catechism of the Catholic Church, Pope John Paul II issued the apostolic constitution Fidei depositum, in which he said: "Guarding the deposit of faith is the mission which the Lord has entrusted to his Church and which she fulfils in every age."

According to Catholic theology, divine revelation ended with the death of the last apostle, John. The development of doctrine does not add to this revelation, nor does it increase the deposit of faith, but it increases the understanding of it. The Catechism of the Catholic Church states: "Even if the Revelation is already complete, it has not been made fully explicit; it remains for Christian faith gradually to grasp its full significance over the course of the centuries".

== Episcopal Church in the USA ==
In the Episcopal Church, the "deposit of faith" refers to "[t]he saving revelation of Christ that has been given to the church, especially as known through biblical witness and tradition".

== See also ==
- Law given to Moses at Sinai, a similar concept in Judaism
