= Prima scriptura =

Christian theological doctrine

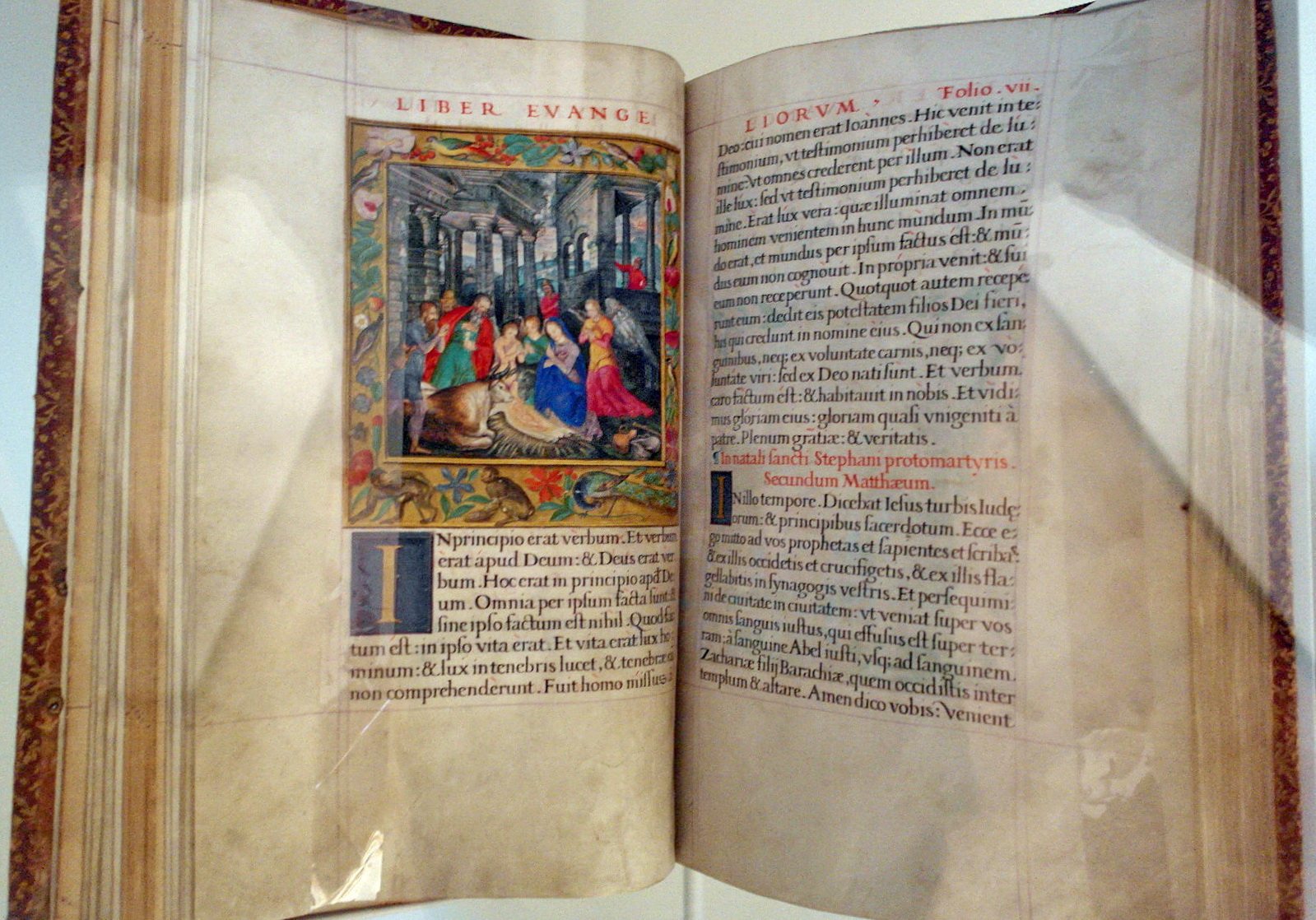
16th century Gospel book, so-called Évangéliaire de Quercentius (Liège, 1564–65) in the collection of Museum Grand Curtius, Liège, Belgium.

Prima scriptura (Church Latin for 'scripture first') is the Christian doctrine that canonized scripture is "first" or "above all other" sources of authority, but that its interpretation may involve other sources. It also treats revelation and reason as related gifts from God, since written revelation must be interpreted through the use of reason. The doctrine is historically held by Anglicans and Methodists.

== Contrast with sola scriptura ==
Prima scriptura is sometimes contrasted to sola scriptura, which literally translates "by the scripture alone". The former doctrine as understood by many Protestants—particularly Evangelicals—is that the Scriptures are the sole infallible rule of faith and practice, but that the Scriptures' meaning can be mediated through many kinds of secondary authority, such as the ordinary teaching offices of the Church, antiquity, the councils of the Christian Church, reason, and experience. An increasing number of Evangelicals cite Scripture itself to support prima scriptura, referring to such teaching as 'walking' or being 'led by the Spirit' as quoted by the Apostle Paul.

However, sola scriptura rejects any original infallible authority other than the Bible. Church councils, preachers, biblical commentators, private revelation, or even a message allegedly from an angel are not an original authority alongside the Bible in the sola scriptura approach, and the authority of most of these is seen as derivative of and subject to examination via the Scriptures; as per 1 John 4:1 the claims of "angelic" messages are to be readily and rigorously examined against the Scriptures in order to certify or refute them.

Both may be contrasted with nuda scriptura, which rejects any authority of any sort other than the Bible; this doctrine is very common amongst fundamentalists.

== Anglicanism ==
Article VI of the 39 Articles, Of the Sufficiency of the Holy Scriptures for Salvation states:

Holy Scripture containeth all things necessary to salvation: so that whatsoever is not read therein, nor may be proved thereby, is not to be required of any man, that it should be believed as an article of the Faith, or be thought requisite or necessary to salvation. In the name of the Holy Scripture we do understand those canonical Books of the Old and New Testament, of whose authority was never any doubt in the Church.

Of the Names and Number of the Canonical Books. Genesis, The First Book of Samuel, The Book of Esther, Exodus, The Second Book of Samuel, The Book of Job, Leviticus, The First Book of Kings, The Psalms, Numbers, The Second Book of Kings, The Proverbs, Deuteronomy, The First Book of Chronicles, Ecclesiastes or Preacher, Joshua, The Second Book of Chronicles, Cantica, or Songs of Solomon, Judges, The First Book of Esdras, Four Prophets the greater, Ruth, The Second Book of Esdras, Twelve Prophets the less.

And the other Books (as Hierome saith) the Church doth read for example of life and instruction of manners; but yet doth it not apply them to establish any doctrine; such are these following:

The Third Book of Esdras, The rest of the Book of Esther, The Fourth Book of Esdras, The Book of Wisdom, The Book of Tobias, Jesus the Son of Sirach, The Book of Judith, Baruch the Prophet, The Song of the Three Children, The Prayer of Manasses, The Story of Susanna, The First Book of Maccabees, Of Bel and the Dragon, The Second Book of Maccabees.

All the Books of the New Testament, as they are commonly received, we do receive, and account them Canonical.

The Anglican view of the role on prima scriptura can be best summarized by Richard Hooker. In his famous work "On the Laws of Ecclesiastical Polity" he developed a view that would be known in the Anglican tradition as the "3-legged stool". This consists of scripture, tradition and reason. Scripture is the source of all revelation in the Christian tradition. At the same time Hooker also saw the necessity of tradition, while not on the same level as scripture, as being an important mediating principle in interpreting. He specifically critiques the Puritan interpretations of sola scriptura that were present at the time in Elizabethan England. This is followed by what Hooker calls the "law of reason". Hookers' 3-legged stool would become the basis of the Methodist quadrilateral as well as form a via media between the Catholic and Lutheran understandings on the relationship between scripture and tradition.

== Methodism ==
Another version of the prima scriptura approach may be the Wesleyan Quadrilateral for the Methodists, which maintains that Scripture is to be the primary authority for the Church. Nonetheless, it is best interpreted through the lenses of reason, personal experience, and Church tradition, although the Bible remains the crucial and normative authority for Christians. According to the United Methodist Church, which adheres to this notion:

"Scripture is considered the primary source and standard for Christian doctrine. Tradition is experience and the witness of development and growth of the faith through the past centuries and in many nations and cultures. Experience is the individual's understanding and appropriating of the faith in the light of his or her own life. Through reason the individual Christian brings to bear on the Christian faith discerning and cogent thought. These four elements taken together bring the individual Christian to a mature and fulfilling understanding of the Christian faith and the required response of worship and service."

== Anabaptism ==
The Anabaptist approach to the Bible has been one that would be characterized as prima scriptura. This has been summarized in the "Principles for Reading Scripture", published by an Anabaptist catechesis-related apostolate, Sound Faith, organized by the Chambersburg Christian Fellowship congregation:

1. We read the New Testament through the lens of what Jesus, our divine Teacher, teaches in the Gospels.
2. We endeavor to read Scripture as simply as possible, without complex interpretations, especially those that explain away our responsibilities as obedient followers of Jesus.
3. We read Scripture passages within their context, seeking the whole voice of Scripture, since verses taken out of context can be used to support any doctrine.
4. We do not accept the traditions of man, even educated religious people, as our lens for reading Scripture.
5. We compare our resulting understanding of Scripture with the doctrines believed by those who lived and wrote directly after the apostles.

With these principles, Anabaptists use the writings of the Church Fathers, not to establish doctrine, but "to verify that we have read Scripture correctly, and to give us continuity with those who have based their lives on apostolic teaching through the ages."

== Others ==
The Quaker Christian concept of the Inward light or the charismatic views of the Holy Spirit as an active force in the life of the believer may be examples of the prima scriptura approach.

While most Pentecostals and Charismatics believe the Bible to be the ultimate authority and would not say that any new revelation can ever contradict the Bible, they do believe that God continues to speak to people today on extra-biblical topics as well as to interpret and apply the text of the Bible.

Besides the Holy Scriptures, the Seventh-day Adventist Church hold Ellen White's writings to be "a continuing and authoritative source of truth which provide for the church." However, Adventists do not necessarily believe that the writings of a so-called post-canonical prophet has equality with Scripture. A leading Adventist theologian has claimed "Adventist theology and ministry depend on the sola-tota-prima Scriptura principle (the Scripture only, in all its parts, and as the first principle of interpretation of natural revelation and the human sciences)."

Jehovah's Witnesses believe that the interpretation of scripture and codification of doctrines is considered the responsibility of the Governing Body of Jehovah's Witnesses.

Christadelphians believe that the Bible is the sole source of instruction from God in terms of the way that they should conduct their affairs. However they do note that some translations of the bible into non-original languages have changed the message, so study of the original texts are important.

== See also ==
- Ante-Nicene Fathers
- Deposit of faith, the contrasting approach towards scripture and tradition in the Catholic Church.
