= List of English Bible translations =

The Bible has been translated into many languages from the biblical languages of Aramaic, Greek, and Hebrew. The Latin Vulgate translation was dominant in Western Christianity through the Middle Ages. Since then, the Bible has been translated into many more languages. English Bible translations also have a rich and varied history of more than a millennium.

Included when possible are dates and the source language(s) and, for incomplete translations, what portion of the text has been translated. Certain terms that occur in many entries are linked at the bottom of the page.

Because various biblical canons are not identical, the "incomplete translations" section includes only translations seen by their translators as incomplete, such as Christian translations of the New Testament alone. Translations comprising only part of certain canons are considered "complete" if they comprise the translators' complete canon, e.g. Jewish versions of the Tanakh.

== Early incomplete Bibles ==
List of incomplete Bibles
Bible	Translated sections	English variant	Date	Source	Notes
Aldhelm	Psalms (existence disputed)	Old English	Late 7th or early 8th century	Vulgate	
Bede	Gospel of John (lost)	Old English	c. 735	Vulgate	
Psalters (12 in total), including the Vespasian Psalter and Eadwine Psalter	English glosses of Latin psalters		9th century	Vulgate	
King Alfred	Pentateuch, including the Ten Commandments; possibly also the Psalms	Old English	c. 900	Vulgate	
Aldred the Scribe	Northumbrian interlinear gloss on the Gospels in the Lindisfarne Gospels	Old English	950 to 970	Vulgate	
Farman	Gloss on the Gospel of Matthew in the Rushworth Gospels	Old English	950 to 970	Vulgate	
Ælfric	Pentateuch, Book of Joshua, Judges	Old English	c. 990	Vulgate	
Wessex Gospels	Gospels	Old English	c. 990	Old Latin	
Caedmon manuscript	A few English Bible verses	Old English	700 to 1000	Vulgate	
The Ormulum	Some passages from the Gospels and the Acts of the Apostles	Middle English	c. 1150	Vulgate	
Rolle	Various passages, including some of the Psalms	Middle English	Early 14th century	Vulgate	
West Midland Psalms	Psalms	Middle English	Early 14th century	Vulgate	
Geoffrey Chaucer, "The Parson's Tale", in The Canterbury Tales	Many Bible verses	Middle English	c. 1400	Vulgate	
A Fourteenth Century Biblical Version: Consisting of a Prologue and Parts of the New Testament	New Testament	Middle English	c. 1400	Vulgate	
Life of Soul	Majority of text consists of Biblical quotations	Middle English	c. 1400	Vulgate	
Nicholas Love, OCart, The Mirror of the Blessed Life of Jesus Christ	Gospels paraphrased	Middle English	c. 1410 (printed 6 times before 1535)	Johannes de Caulibus, OFM (possible author), Meditationes Vitae Christi (in Latin)	
William Caxton	Various passages	Middle English	1483 (Golden Legend); 1484 (The Book of the Knight of the Tower)	A French translation	
Tyndale Bible	Incomplete translation. Tyndale's other Old Testament work went into the Matthew's Bible (1537).	Early Modern English	1526 (New Testament, revised 1534); 1530 (Pentateuch)	Masoretic Text; Erasmus' third NT edition (1522); Martin Luther's 1522 German Bible.	

== Partial Bibles ==
Bible	Abbr.	Content	English variant	Year	Source	Notes
Aramaic English New Testament		New Testament	Modern English and Hebrew (Divine names)	2008–2012	Aramaic New Testament texts	A literal translation of the oldest known Aramaic New Testament texts in the form of a study bible having extensive annotation, a historical practice of textual scholarship to assist understanding in context. In this case, the period of early Christianity. For example, explaining the literal Aramaic of “Jesus” as “Y'shua”. The Aramaic is featured with Hebrew letters and vowel pointing.
Bible in Worldwide English		New Testament	Modern English	1969		
Brenton's English Translation of the Septuagint		Old Testament	Modern English	1844	Septuagint	
Centenary Translation of the New Testament		New Testament	Modern English	1924		By Helen Barrett Montgomery.
The Christian Scriptures		New Testament	Modern English	In progress (December 2019)	Greek-English interlinear Bibles and public domain translations of the New Testament	No chapters or verses; includes line numbers; logical book order; footnotes for every OT quotation in the NT; extensive index and preface
The Common Edition New Testament		New Testament	Modern English	1999		
Confraternity Bible		New Testament	Modern English	1941	Revision of the Challoner Revision of the Rheims New Testament.	OT was translated in stages, with editions progressively replacing books in the Challoner revision of the Douay-Rheims; when complete, it was published in 1970 as the New American Bible
Disciples' Literal New Testament		New Testament	Modern English	2011	Greek New Testament	Literal New Testament by Michael Magill aiming for clarity with consistent terms.
Emphatic Diaglott		New Testament	Modern English	1864	Greek text recension by Dr Johann Jakob Griesbach	
First Nations Version		Gospels	Indigenous English	2021		
Five Pauline Epistles, A New Translation		New Testament	Modern English	1908 (combined in one volume in 1984)		Epistles of Romans, 1st and 2nd Corinthians, and 1st and 2nd Thessalonians, by Scottish scholar William Gunion Rutherford
The Four Gospels		Gospels of Matthew, Mark, Luke & John	Modern English	1952		By E. V. Rieu, Penguin.
God's New Covenant: A New Testament Translation		New Testament	Modern English	1989		
Grail Psalms		Book of Psalms	Modern English	1963 (revised 2008, 2018)	French La Bible de Jérusalem	Translated according to the principles of Gelineau psalmody. Used for liturgical worship by the Catholic Church.
Joseph Smith Translation of the Bible	JST		Modern English	1844	Revision of the King James Version	Also called the "Inspired Version" (IV) by Latter Day Saints
The Kingdom New Testament: A Contemporary Translation		New Testament	Modern English	2011	Eclectic Greek	By NT Wright.
The Living Oracles		New Testament	Modern English	1826	Compiled and translated by Alexander Campbell based translations by George Campbell, James MacKnight and Philip Doddridge, with reference to the 1805 critical Greek text by Johann Jakob Griesbach	Replaces traditional ecclesiastical terminology such as "church", "bishop" and "baptise" with alternative translations such as "congregation", "overseer" and "immerse".
Messianic Aleph Tav Scriptures	MATS	Tanakh (Hebrew Bible) and some of the New Testament	Modern English and Hebrew (Divine Names)	In progress	Masoretic Text Old Testament	MATS is a study Bible which focuses on the study of the Aleph Tav character symbol used throughout the Old Testament (Tanakh) in both the Pentateuch and the Prophets, from the Messianic point of view. This English rendition reveals every place the Hebrew Aleph Tav symbol was used as a "free-standing" character symbol believed by some Messianic groups to express the "strength of the covenant" in its original meaning.
A New New Testament: A Bible for the Twenty-first Century Combining Traditional and Newly Discovered Texts		New Testament and a selection of NT apocrypha	Modern English	2013		A translation of all the books included in the traditional New Testament canon, with the addition of the ten new books (mostly coming from the Nag Hammadi manuscripts): Gospel of Thomas; Gospel of Mary; Gospel of Truth; The Thunder: Perfect Mind; Odes of Solomon (I, II, III, IV); Prayer of Thanksgiving; Prayer of the Apostle Paul; Acts of Paul and Thecla; Letter of Peter to Philip; Secret Revelation of John. Edited and with commentary by biblical scholar Hal Taussig.
The New Testament translated by Richmond Lattimore		New Testament	Modern English	1962–1982 (Compiled in one volume in 1996)	Wescott-Hort text by Richmond Lattimore.	
The New Testament, A New Translation		New Testament	Modern English	1913	Greek text of Hermann von Soden	By James Moffatt.
The New Testament: A Translation (2nd edition)		New Testament	Modern English	2017, 2023	Primarily, the Critical Text of the New Testament (NASB28 & UBS5) but also the Majority Text, especially "the Patriarchal Text of the Greek Orthodox church from 1904".	This translation is by the American Eastern Orthodox scholar and writer David Bentley Hart. Hart translates Christos as "Anointed" and Ioudaios as "Judaean" rather than as "Jew". In 2019, the first edition of Hart's translation was the subject of a session of the annual meeting of the Society of Biblical Literature with three of the presented papers being subsequently published in The Bible Translator.
The New Testament in Modern English		New Testament	Modern English	1958		By J.B. Phillips.
The Open English Bible		New Testament	Modern English	In progress (2010)	Twentieth Century New Testament (English), Wescott-Hort (Greek), Leningrad Codex (Hebrew)	Aiming to be the first modern public domain translation, with the NT edited from the public domain Twentieth Century New Testament and the OT newly translated.
Plain English Version	PEV	New Testament (most), Old Testament (few)	Modern English	In progress (2019-2024)		https://australianbibles.org.au/english-plain/ https://australianbibles.org.au/wp-content/uploads/2026/07/PEV-Mini-Bible-2024-Digital-copy.pdf https://wycliffe.org.au/why-do-we-need-another-version-of-the-english-bible/ https://www.bible.com/versions/2530-pev-plain-english-version
Torah and Former Prophets, translated by William Whitt		Tanakh (Hebrew Bible)	Modern English	2018–2025	Masoretic Text (with special focus on the Aleppo Codex)	Organizes the text by the Masoretic section divisions (parashot) rather than the traditional Christian chapter divisions. All nine books have been published: Genesis, Exodus, Leviticus, Numbers, Deuteronomy, Joshua, Judges, Samuel, and Kings; all are open access and accessible at https://archive.org.
Twentieth Century New Testament		New Testament	Modern English	1904	Greek text of Westcott and Hort.	
The Unvarnished New Testament		New Testament	Modern English	1991		
Weymouth New Testament		New Testament	Modern English	1903	The Resultant Greek Testament.	
Wuest Expanded Translation		New Testament	Modern English	1961	Nestle-Aland Text	

== Complete Bibles ==
Complete Bibles
Bible	Abbr.	English variant	Date	Source	Notes	Denominational
365 Day Bible	365DB	Modern English	2020	Modern revision of World English Bible	This version is public domain.	
American Standard Version	ASV	Modern English	1901	Masoretic Text, Westcott and Hort 1881 and Tregelles 1857	This version is now in the public domain due to copyright expiration.	Protestant
Amplified Bible	AMP	Modern English	1965 (first complete publication)	Revision of the American Standard Version		
An American Translation		Modern English	1935	Masoretic Text, various Greek texts.		
Beck's American Translation		Modern English	1976	Masoretic Text, various Greek texts.		Lutheran
Berean Standard Bible	BSB	Modern English	2022	Masoretic Text, various Greek texts.	Published by the Bible Hub website. Released in the Public Domain.	
Majority Standard Bible	MSB	Modern English	2022	Masoretic Text, Robinson-Pierpont Majority Text	Byzantine Majority Text version of the Berean Standard Bible. Released in the Public Domain.	
Berkeley Version		Modern English	1958			
Bible in Basic English	BBE	Modern English	1949	Basic English translation of the King James Version.	Translated by Professor S. H. Hooke, the BBE uses a simplified vocabulary of 1000 English words.	
The Bible in Living English		Modern English	1972			Jehovah's Witnesses
Bishops' Bible		Early Modern English	1568	Masoretic Text, Textus Receptus		Anglican
Children's King James Version		Modern English	1962	Revision of the King James Version.	by Jay P. Green	
Christian Community Bible, English version	CCB	Modern English	1988	Hebrew and Greek	English version of the Biblia Latinoamericana translated by Fr. Bernardo Hurault.	Roman Catholic
Christian Standard Bible	CSB	Modern English	2017	Biblia Hebraica Stuttgartensia, Novum Testamentum Graece 28th Edition (NA28), United Bible Societies 5th Edition (UBS5).	The new Christian Standard Bible (CSB) is a major Baptist revision of the 2009 edition of the Holman Christian Standard Bible (HCSB)	Baptist
Clear Word Bible		Modern English	1994	Paraphrase		Unofficial Adventist
Common English Bible	CEB	Modern English	2011			
Complete Jewish Bible	CJB	Modern English	1998	Paraphrase of the Jewish Publication Society of America Version (Old Testament), and from Greek (New Testament) text.		Messianic Judaism
Contemporary English Version	CEV	Modern English	1995			Protestant
Concordant Literal Version	CLV	Modern English	1926; Revised 1931, 1966	Restored Greek syntax. A concordance of every form of every Greek word was made and systematized and turned into English. The whole Greek vocabulary was analyzed and translated, using a standard English equivalent for each Greek element.		
Coverdale Bible	TCB	Early Modern English	1535	Masoretic Text, the Greek New Testament of Erasmus, Vulgate, and German and Swiss-German Bibles (Luther Bible, Zürich Bible and Leo Jud's Bible)	First complete Bible printed in English (Early Modern English)	Anglican
CTS New Catholic Bible (Catholic Truth Society edition)	CTS-NCB	Modern English	2007	Revision of New Jerusalem Bible.		Roman Catholic and Anglican
Darby Bible	DBY	Modern English	1890	Masoretic Text, various critical editions of the Greek text (i.a. Tregelles, Tischendorf, Westcott and Hort).	This Bible version is now Public Domain due to copyright expiration.	Not associated with any church. Because of the short version of the title on the Darby Bible, which is New Translation, it is often confused with a translation done decades later by the Jehovah's Witnesses organization named the New World Translation.
Divine Name King James Bible	DNKJB	Early Modern English	2011	Masoretic Text, Textus Receptus	Authorized King James Version which restores the Divine Name, Jehovah to the original text in 6,973 places, Jah in 50 places and Jehovah also appears in parentheses in the New Testament wherever the New Testament cross references a quote from the Old Testament in 297 places. Totaling to 7,320 places.	Messianic Judaism
Douay–Rheims Bible	DRB	Early Modern English	1582 (NT); 1609–1610 (OT)	Latin Vulgate, Greek, and Hebrew manuscripts.	This work is now Public Domain.	Roman Catholic
Douay-Rheims Bible (Challoner Revision)	DRB	Early Modern English	1752	Clementine Vulgate	This Bible version is now Public Domain due to copyright expiration.	Roman Catholic
EasyEnglish Bible	EASY	Modern English	2018	Masoretic Text, Nestle-Aland Novum Testamentum Graece	Translated by MissionAssist	
Easy-to-Read Version		Modern English	1989	Textus Receptus, United Bible Society (UBS) Greek text, Nestle-Aland Text		Christian
Emphasized Bible	EBR	Modern English	1902	Translated by Joseph Bryant Rotherham based on The New Testament in the Original Greek and Christian David Ginsburg's Massoretico-critical edition of the Hebrew Bible (1894)	Uses various methods, such as "emphatic idiom" and special diacritical marks, to bring out nuances of the underlying Greek, Hebrew, and Aramaic texts. Public Domain due to copyright expiration.	Christian
English Standard Version	ESV	Modern English	2001 (revisions in 2007, 2011, and 2016)	Derived from the 1971 edition of the Revised Standard Version. Based on Biblia Hebraica Stuttgartensia (5th ed., 1997); UBS Greek New Testament (5th corrected ed.); and Novum Testamentum Graece (28th ed., 2012).	Adheres to an "essentially literal" translation philosophy. Attempts wherever possible for the Old Testament "to translate difficult Hebrew passages as they stand in the Masoretic text rather than resorting to emendations or to finding an alternative reading in the ancient versions."	Protestant
English Standard Version Catholic Edition	ESV-CE	Modern English	2018	Catholic edition of the English Standard Version.	Includes the deuterocanonical books.	Roman Catholic
Evangelical Heritage Version	EHV	Modern English	2019			Lutheran
Expanded Bible	EXB	Modern English	2011	The base text is a modified version of the New Century Version.	Offers alternate translations alongside the main translation	
Ferrar Fenton Bible		Modern English	1903	Masoretic Text and Westcott-Hort		
Free Bible Version	FBV	Modern English	2018	Novum Testamentum Graece	Released under Creative Commons license (BY-SA)	
Geneva Bible	GEN	Early Modern English	1557 (NT); 1560 (complete Bible)	Masoretic Text, Textus Receptus	First English Bible with the whole of the Old Testament translated directly from Hebrew texts	Calvinist, Presbyterian, Puritan
God's Word	GW	Modern English	1995			Lutheran and Christian
Good News Bible	GNB	Modern English	1976	United Bible Societies (UBS) Greek text	Formerly known as Today's English Version	
Great Bible		Early Modern English	1539	Masoretic Text, Greek New Testament of Erasmus, the Vulgate, and the Luther Bible.		Anglican
The Hebrew Bible: A Translation with Commentary		Modern English	2018	Masoretic Text	Robert Alter's translation of the Hebrew Bible	
Holman Christian Standard Bible	HCSB	Modern English	2004	Biblia Hebraica Stuttgartensia, Novum Testamentum Graece 27th Edition, United Bible Societies 4th Edition.		Southern Baptist
The Inclusive Bible		Modern English	2009		Translation done by Priests for Equality of the Quixote Center.	
International Standard Version	ISV	Modern English	2011			
Jerusalem Bible	JB	Modern English	1966	From the original Hebrew, Aramaic, and Greek, with influence from the French La Bible de Jérusalem.	This Bible was heavily influenced by the French original, and the commentary was a verbatim translation of the French	Roman Catholic
Jewish Publication Society of America Version Tanakh	JPS	Modern English	1917	Masoretic Text	The Old Testament translation is based on the Hebrew Masoretic text. It follows the edition of Seligman Baer except for the books of Exodus to Deuteronomy, which never appeared in Baer's edition. For those books, C. D. Ginsburg's Hebrew text was used. This Bible version is now Public Domain due to copyright expiration.	Judaism
Jubilee Bible	JUB	Modern English	2000	Aims for a unique English word for each original Hebrew and Greek word. Influenced by Spanish Bible translations by Casiodoro de Reina (1569), Francisco de Enzinas (1543), and Juan Pérez de Pineda (1557).	Published by Ransom Press International, Russell Stendal, translator and editor.	
Judaica Press Tanakh		Modern English	1963	Masoretic Text		Orthodox Judaism
Julia E. Smith Parker Translation		Modern English	1876	Masoretic Text, Textus Receptus		Congregationalist
King James Version (a.k.a. the Authorized Version)	KJV or AV	Early Modern English	1611, 1769	Masoretic Text, Septuagint, Vulgate, Textus Receptus, Tyndale 1526 NT, some Erasmus manuscripts, and Bezae 1598 TR.	Public domain in most of the world. Crown copyright in the United Kingdom due to crown letters patent until 2039, and all countries which have international mutual copyright recognition agreements.	Anglican
Knox Bible		Modern English	1955.	Vulgate, with influence from the original Hebrew, Aramaic, and Greek.	Translated by Msgr. Ronald Knox.	Roman Catholic
Lamsa Bible		Modern English	1933	Syriac Peshitta		
Leeser Bible, Tanakh (Old Testament)		Modern English	1994	Masoretic Text		Orthodox Judaism, Conservative Judaism, and Protestant Episcopal
Legacy Standard Bible	LSB	Modern English	2021	Masoretic Text, Nestle-Aland Text	Published by Three Sixteen Publishing, Inc. and the Lockman Foundation.	Evangelical Protestant
Lexham English Bible	LEB	Modern English	2012	SBL Greek New Testament	A relatively literal translation from Logos Bible Software.	
Literal Standard Version	LSV	Modern English	2020	Masoretic Text, Septuagint, Dead Sea Scrolls, Textus Receptus, other New Testament manuscripts consulted	Published by Covenant Press. It is the first English translation featuring continuous text-blocks similar to the autographs. It also makes use of the caesura mark and the transliterated Tetragrammaton.	
A Literal Translation of the Bible	LITV	Modern English	1985	Masoretic Text, Textus Receptus (Estienne 1550)	by Jay P. Green	
The Living Bible	TLB	Modern English	1971	American Standard Version (paraphrase)		Evangelical Protestant Roman Catholic (Version)
The Living Torah and The Living Nach. Tanakh		Modern English	1994	Masoretic Text		Orthodox Judaism
LOLCat Bible Translation Project		LOLspeak	2010			
Matthew's Bible		Early Modern English	1537	Masoretic Text, the Greek New Testament of Erasmus, the Vulgate, the Luther Bible, and a 1535 bible from France.		Anglican
The Message	MSG	Modern English	2002		A paraphrase into contemporary language and idiom by Eugene Peterson.	traditional Protestant Roman Catholic (Version)
Mickelson Clarified Translation	MCT	Modern English Dialect	2008, 2013, 2015, 2019	"Clarified Textus Receptus"—including the Masoretic Text, Textus Receptus, MCT Octuagint, and the MCT Brit Chadashah; with contextual dictionaries and concordances.	States "A precise and unabridged translation of the 'Clarified Textus Receptus' -- including Hebrew OT to English, Greek NT to English, Hebrew OT to Greek OT (the MCT Octuagint) to English, and Greek NT to Hebrew NT (the MCT Brit Chadashah)". The translation methodology is: "Concept for concept, Context for context, Word for word." Published in "the Literary Reading Order" by LivingSon Press	
Modern English Version	MEV	Modern English	2014	Masoretic Text, Textus Receptus	Revision of the King James Bible	Eastern and Oriental Orthodox, Roman Catholic, Protestant
Modern Language Bible		Modern English	1969		Also called "The New Berkeley Version"	
Moffatt, New Translation		Modern English	1926	Greek text of Hermann von Soden		
Names of God Bible	NOG	Modern English (GW) & Early Modern English (KJV)	2011. 2014	GW edition: NT: Nestle-Aland Greek New Testament 27th edition. OT: Biblia Hebraica Stuttgartensia. KJV edition: OT: Masoretic Text, NT: Textus Receptus.	By Ann Spangler, The Names of God Bible restores the transliterations of ancient names—such as Yahweh, El Shadday, El Elyon, and Adonay—to help the reader better understand the rich meaning of God's names that are found in the original Hebrew and Aramaic text.	
New American Bible	NAB	Modern English	1970, 1986 (revised NT), 1991 (revised Psalms)			Roman Catholic
New American Bible Revised Edition	NABRE	Modern English	2011	Biblia Hebraica Stuttgartensia for the Hebrew Bible, Dead Sea Scrolls consulted and referenced, Septuagint also consulted and compared for the OT and Deuterocanonicals, the Latin Vulgate for some parts of the Deuterocanonicals, and the United Bible Societies 3rd edition (UBS3) cross referenced to the 26th edition of the Greek New Testament (NA26) for the New Testament	The NABRE is the latest official English Catholic Bible translation released. An update to it (mainly to the New Testament as of now) is scheduled for release in 2025.	Roman Catholic
New American Standard Bible	NASB	Modern English	1971, 1995, 2020	Masoretic Text, Nestle-Aland Text		Evangelical Protestant
New Catholic Bible (Saint Joseph edition)	NCB	Modern English	2015 (New Testament), 2019 (Complete Bible)			Roman Catholic
New Century Version	NCV	Modern English	1991			
New Community Bible	NCB	Modern English	2008	Revision of Christian Community Bible.		Roman Catholic
New English Bible	NEB	Modern English	1970	Masoretic Text, Greek New Testament		
New English Translation (NET Bible)	NET	Modern English	2005	Masoretic Text, Nestle-Aland/United Bible Society Greek New Testament		
New International Reader's Version	NIrV	Modern English	1998		New International Version (simplified syntax, but loss of conjunctions obscures meanings)	
New International Version Inclusive Language Edition	NIVI	Modern English	1996	Revision of the New International Version.		
New International Version	NIV	Modern English	1978, 1984, 2011	Masoretic Text, Nestle-Aland Greek New Testament (based on Westcott-Hort, Weiss and Tischendorf, 1862).		Protestant
New Jerusalem Bible	NJB	Modern English	1985	From the original Hebrew, Aramaic, and Greek, with influence from the French La Bible de Jérusalem.	An update to the 1966 Jerusalem Bible which uses more extensive gender neutral language	Roman Catholic
New Jewish Publication Society of America Version. Tanakh	NJPS	Modern English	1985	Masoretic Text		
New King James Version	NKJV	Modern English	1982	Masoretic Text (Biblia Hebraica Stuttgartensia, 1983), Textus Receptus		Evangelical, Protestant
New Life Version	NLV	Modern English	1986			
New Living Translation	NLT	Modern English	1996 (revisions in 2004, 2007, 2013, and 2015)			Evangelical, Protestant, Roman Catholic (Version)
New Revised Standard Version	NRSV	Modern English	1989; 2021 (Updated Edition)		Revision of the Revised Standard Version.	Mainline Protestant Roman Catholic (Version)
New World Translation of the Holy Scriptures	NWT	Modern English	1950 (New Testament) 1960 (single volume complete Bible) 1984 (reference edition with footnotes) 2013 (revised) 2018 (Study Bible)	Westcott and Hort's Greek New Testament, Nestle-Aland Greek New Testament, Hebrew J documents, as well as various other families of Hebrew and Greek manuscripts.	This is the Jehovah's Witnesses' translation of the Bible published by their Watch Tower Bible & Tract Society	Jehovah's Witnesses
The Orthodox Jewish Bible	OJB	Modern English	2002			Messianic Judaism
The Orthodox Study Bible	OSB	Modern English	2008	Septuagint by St. Athanasius Academy for the Old Testament and the New King James Version for the New Testament.		Eastern Orthodox
Quaker Bible		Modern English	1764	Masoretic Text, Textus Receptus		Quakers
Recovery Version of the Bible		Modern English	1985 (NT w/ footnotes, revised 1991) 1993 (NT, text only) 1999 (single volume complete Bible, text only) 2003 (single volume complete Bible w/ footnotes)	OT: Biblia Hebraica Stuttgartensia (BHS; revised 1990 edition). NT: Novum Testamentum Graece (Nestle-Aland Greek New Testament, 26th edition)	A study Bible with a modern English translation of the Scriptures from their original languages. Comparable to the English Standard Version and the New American Standard Bible.	Local churches (affiliation)
Revised New Jerusalem Bible	RNJB	Modern English	2018 (New Testament), 2019 (Complete Bible)		Revision of the New Jerusalem Bible.	Roman Catholic
Revised Version, also English Revised Version	RV, also ERV	Modern English	1885		Revision of the King James Version, but with a critical New Testament text: Westcott and Hort 1881 and Tregelles 1857	Anglican
Revised Standard Version	RSV	Modern English	1946 (New Testament), 1952 (Complete Bible)	Masoretic Text, Nestle-Aland Greek New Testament.	Revision of the American Standard Version.	Mainline Protestant Roman Catholic (see below)
Revised Standard Version Catholic Edition	RSV-CE	Modern English	1965 (New Testament), 1966 (Complete Bible)		Reordering of Deuterocanonical Books of the Revised Standard Version to reflect traditional book order with other Old Testament Books.	Roman Catholic
Revised Standard Version - Second Catholic Edition	RSV-2CE	Modern English	2006	The RSV-2CE is a slight update of the 1966 Revised Standard Version - Catholic Edition	It removes archaic pronouns (thee, thou) and accompanying verb forms (didst, speaketh), revises passages used in the lectionary according to the Vatican document Liturgiam authenticam and elevates some passages out of RSV footnotes when they reflect Catholic teaching. For instance, the RSV-2CE renders "almah" as "virgin" in Isaiah 7:14, restores the term "begotten" in John 3:16 and other verses, uses the phrase "full of grace" instead of "favored one" in Luke 1:28, and substitutes "mercy" for "steadfast love" (translated from the Hebrew hesed) throughout the Psalms. As with the original RSV, gender-neutral language is not used when it has no direct referent in original language of the text.	Roman Catholic
Revised English Bible	REB	Modern English	1989		Revision of the New English Bible.	
The Scriptures		Modern English & Hebrew (Divine Names)	1993, revised 1998 & revised 2009	Masoretic Text (Biblia Hebraica), Textus Receptus Greek text	Sacred Name Bible translation by the Institute for Scripture Research	
Simple English Bible		Modern English.	1978. 1980.		This version is based on a limited 3000 word vocabulary and everyday sentence structure - it is also known as "the Plain English Bible, the International English Bible, and the God Chasers Extreme New Testament"	
The Story Bible		Modern English	1971		A summary/paraphrase, by Pearl S. Buck	
Taverner's Bible		Early Modern English	1539		Minor revision of Matthew's Bible	
The Holy Bible: Jah International Version: The Sacred Scriptures of Rastafari	JIV	Modern English	2017			Rastafari
Thomson's Translation		Modern English	1808	Codex Vaticanus (according to the introduction in the reprint edition by S. F. Pells) of the Septuagint (but excluding the Apocrypha) and of the New Testament		
Today's New International Version	TNIV	Modern English	2005	Masoretic Text (Biblia Hebraica Stuttgartensia, 1983), Nestle-Aland Greek text	Revision of the New International Version.	
Third Millennium Bible	TMB	Modern English	1998	Same as the AV: Masoretic Text, Septuagint, Vulgate, Textus Receptus, Tyndale 1526 NT, some Erasmus manuscripts, and Bezae 1598 TR.	Revision of the King James Version.	Anglican
Tree of Life Bible	TLB	Modern English	2014	Masoretic Text, the 27th Nestle-Aland Novum Testamentum Graece	The Old Testament translation is based on the Hebrew Masoretic text. It follows the edition of Seligman Baer except for the books of Exodus to Deuteronomy, which never appeared in Baer's edition. For those books, C. D. Ginsburg's Hebrew text was used.	Messianic Judaism
The Voice Bible	VOICE	Modern English	2012		"The heart of the project is retelling the story of the Bible in a form as fluid as modern literary works while remaining painstakingly true to the original Greek, Hebrew, and Aramaic texts."	
Webster's Revision		Modern English	1833		Revision of the King James Version.	
Westminster Version of Sacred Scripture	WVSS	Modern English	1913 (first volumes of the NT) 1915, 1935 (various volumes and editions of the WVSS were published from 1913 - 1935)	Greek and Hebrew	This was an early Catholic attempt to translate the Bible into English from the original Hebrew, Aramaic and Greek languages instead of from the Latin Vulgate. Was partially translated and released in various versions with the Douay-Rheims making up whatever books were not yet translated.	
World English Bible	WEB	Modern English	2000–2022	Based on the American Standard Version first published in 1901, the Biblia Hebraica Stutgartensa Old Testament, and the Greek Majority Text New Testament.	Released into the public domain by Rainbow Missions, Inc. (nonprofit corporation)	Ecumenical
World Messianic Bible (Formerly called the Hebrew Names Version)	WMB (or HNV)	Modern English	2000–2022	Derived from the World English Bible mostly by substituting Hebrew forms of certain names for their Greek/English equivalents.	Released into the public domain by Rainbow Missions, Inc. (nonprofit corporation)	Messianic Judaism
Wycliffe's Bible (1388)	WYC	Middle English	1388	Latin Vulgate		Lollard
Young's Literal Translation	YLT	Modern English	1862	Masoretic Text, Textus Receptus	This Bible version is now public domain due to copyright expiration.	

== Aramaic to English translations ==
Translations from Syriac to English include:

- Translation of the Four Gospels from the Peschito, based on the eastern text, J. W. Etheridge (1846)
- John Wesley Etheridge's translation of the entire New Testament appears in The Etheridge New Testament (2013) compiled by Bruce A. Klein (has Etheridge's bracketed comments), and also in Etheridge Translation of the Aramaic Peshitta New Testament (2016) compiled by Ewan MacLeod
- Murdock Translation of the Aramaic Peshitta New Testament (2015) compiled by Ewan MacLeod
- The Syriac New Testament, based on the western text, James Murdock (1851)
- The New Testament According to the Eastern Text. Translated from Original Aramaic Sources. Philadelphia: A.J. Holman, 1940, based on the eastern text, George Lamsa
- The Peshitta Holy Bible Translated (2019) by David Bauscher
- The Original Aramaic New Testament in Plain English with Psalms & Proverbs (8th edition with notes) (2013) by David Bauscher
- Aramaic Peshitta New Testament Translation by Janet M. Magiera
- The Messianic Aleph Tav Interlinear Scriptures: Volume Four Gospels (2016) and Messianic Aleph Tav Interlinear Scriptures: Volume Five Acts-Revelation by William H. Sanford (interlinear Aramaic + Etheridge translation; interlinear Greek + English translation)
- The Aramaic Gospels and Acts: Text and Translation (2003) by Joseph Pashka
- A Translation, in English Daily Used, of the Peshito-Syriac Text, and of the Received Greek Text, of Hebrews, James, 1 Peter, and 1 John (1889) and A Translation, In English Daily Used, of the Seventeen Letters Forming Part of the Peshito-Syriac Books (1890) by William Norton
- The Testimony of Yeshua (2013) by Lonnie Martin is a reworked Etheridge and Murdock rendition of the New Testament
- The Message of Matthew: An Annotated Parallel Aramaic-English Gospel of Matthew (1991) by Rocco A. Errico
- Crawford Codex of Revelation: Aramaic Interlinear with English Translation (2016) by Greg Glaser
- Gorgias Press's The Antioch Bible series contains the Peshitta New Testament with English translation, plus many Peshitta Old Testament books
- Lapid Jewish Aramaic New Testament by Christopher Fredrickson and Lapid Publications is a translation from the Khabouris Codex, Yonan Codex and Houghton 1199 Codex. It also includes 560 transliterations and definitions of key Aramaic words and phrases within the text. (2010)

This list does not include adaptations of such as the Hebraic Roots Version by James Trimm (2001) which are adaptations from the JPS New Testament (translated directly from Greek into Hebrew), not the Peshitta.

== See also ==
- Jane Aitken, first woman in the United States to print an English version of the Bible
- Julia Evelina Smith, first woman to translate the Bible from its original languages into English
- Bible glosses
- Byzantine text-type
- Catholic Bibles
- English translations of the Bible
- Gospel
- Middle English Bible translations
- Miscellaneous English Bible translations
- Modern English Bible translations
- Nestle-Aland Text
- Pentateuch
- Peshitta
- Psalms
- Psalter
- Septuagint
- Textus Receptus
- Trilingual heresy
- Vulgate
- Early translations of the New Testament
