= Mystery of faith =

Christian phrase

"The mystery of faith" and "a mystery of faith" are phrases found in different contexts and with a variety of meanings, either as translations of Greek τὸ μυστήριον τῆς πίστεως (tò mystérion tês písteos) or Latin mysterium fidei, or as independent English phrases.

== Two English translations of 1 Timothy 3:9 ==
The phrase "the mystery of faith" is given as a translation of the phrase "τὸ μυστήριον τῆς πίστεως" in 1 Timothy 3:9 in two English versions of the Bible: the Wycliffe Bible and the Douay–Rheims Bible. This translation of the text is exceptional, since far more numerous are the Bible versions that render the phrase as "the mystery of the faith", while others still have phrases like "the deep truths of the faith" (New International Version and New International Reader's Version); "the secret of the faith that God made known to us" (New Century Version); "the revealed truth of the faith" (Good News Translation); "the mystery of the Christian faith" (God's Word Translation); "the true faith that God has now made known to us" (Easy-to-Read Version); "what God has shown us about our faith" (Contemporary English Version); "the faith that has been revealed" (Common English Bible); "the secret of the faith" (Young's Literal Translation); "God's plan and what we believe" (Worldwide English).

The passage in question requires deacons to hold to this "mystery of faith", "the deep truths of the faith", "the true faith that God has now made known to us" or however else it can best be expressed. Richard C. H. Lenski identifies it with "the mystery of godliness" mentioned in verse 16 of the same chapter. According to Witness Lee, it is mainly Christ and the church. This mystery, Andrew Louth says, interrogates us rather than being questioned by us. Barnes' Notes on the Bible identifies the word "the faith" in this context with "the gospel", a view with which Gill's Exposition of the Entire Bible agrees, as does the People's New Testament, while Clarke's communion on the Bible remarks that one manuscripts gives, in place of "the faith", "the resurrection of the dead, which is one of the greatest mysteries of the faith. Floyd H. Barackman says that in this passage "the faith" refers to the whole of the New Testament.

== Theosophical idea ==
Arthur Edward Waite wrote that in the Zohar, which is the foundational work of the Jewish Kabbalah, there lie embedded fragments of a mystical work, Sepher ha-bahir, an anonymous work of Jewish mysticism, attributed to the 1st century, behind which Waite discerned "a single radical and essential thesis which is spoken of in general terms as 'The Mystery of Faith'." The Mystery of Faith, he said, is represented by the letter of the Tetragrammaton and is identical with the Mystery of Sex. He saw the Mystery of Faith as underlying also popular Christian devotion, such as the veneration of relics, and the doctrine of the Eucharist, and the legends of the Grail as telling that "the secret words, which were of the essence of the Mystery of Faith, had passed out of all common knowledge".

== Theological term ==
In theology, an article of faith or doctrine which defies man's ability to grasp it fully, something that transcends reason, is called "a mystery of the faith". The Catechism of the Catholic Church speaks of the Trinity as "a mystery of faith in the strict sense, one of the 'mysteries that are hidden in God, which can never be known unless they are revealed by God'", and it declares: "The mystery of the Most Holy Trinity is the central mystery of Christian faith and life. It is the mystery of God in himself. It is therefore the source of all the other mysteries of faith, the light that enlightens them." The Church itself is "a mystery of the faith".

Ludwig Feuerbach applied the phrase "the mystery of faith" to belief in the power of prayer.

"The Mystery of Faith" is used in the title of some books as a reference to the totality of the doctrine of the Eastern Orthodox Church or of the Catholic Church. More frequent are books of that title that refer to Roman Catholic doctrine on the Eucharist, which was the subject also of a papal encyclical by Pope Paul VI, whose incipit was Mysterium fidei (Latin for "mystery of faith" or "mystery of the faith").

The phrase "a mystery of faith", rather than "the mystery of faith", appears also with reference to the Eucharist, as in the title of a book by Joseph M. Champlin.

== Translation of a phrase in the Roman-Rite Mass ==
Since November 2011, the phrase "mysterium fidei" in the Roman Rite liturgy of the Mass is officially translated as "the mystery of faith", while from 1973 to 2011 the English phrase used as an equivalent was "Let us proclaim the mystery of faith".

In this context, the phrase, spoken or sung after the Words of Institution, refers to "the entire mystery of salvation through Christ's death, resurrection and ascension, which is made present in the celebration of the Eucharist". As originally inserted into the words of consecration, perhaps in reaction to the denial by Manichaeism of the goodness of material things, it may have been an expression of the Catholic Church's belief that salvation comes through Christ's material blood and through participation in the sacrament, which makes use of a material element.
