= NCV =

NCV may refer to:

- Net calorific value, a synonym for "lower heating value"
- Nerve conduction velocity, a measurement performed in neurophysiological tests
- New Century Version, an English translation of the Christian Bible
- New Catholic Bible, formerly known as New Catholic Version, an English translation of the Christian Bible
- Chinese New Version, formerly known as New Chinese Version, a Chinese translation of the Christian Bible
- N. C. Vasanthakokilam (1919–1951), Indian Carnatic music singer
- North and Central Vanuatu languages, a subgroup of Oceanic languages
- Non-combatant casualty value, an estimate for the value placed on civilian lives in military operations
- Non Contact Voltage Detection, technique used to detect AC voltage by approaching with probes
- Nuit Centrale Verticale, a student association that organizes climbing competitions
