= Five Pauline Epistles, A New Translation =

Translation by William Gunion Rutherford

The Five Pauline Epistles, A New Translation is a partial Bible translation produced by Scottish scholar William Gunion Rutherford, of five books of the New Testament. The Bible books that were translated into English by Rutherford are a number of Pauline Epistles or "didactic letters", believed to be written by the Jewish Christian Apostle Paul. The work was a translation of the Bible books of Romans, first and second Thessalonians, and first and second Corinthians, with a brief analysis. The work was commenced in 1900, and was completed in 1908. The entire work was brought together in one volume in 1984.

== Compilation ==
G.W. Rutherford first translated the Book of Romans, in 1900. The title was St. Paul's Epistle to the Romans. A New Translation with a brief analysis by W. G Rutherford. So that was his first Bible epistle, translated. He worked on and finished four others. But Rutherford then died in 1907. His finished translation manuscript was left on his desk, some of it written in pencil, but clear and intact, and ready for press.

Then in 1908, one year after his death, Rutherford's translation, of Thessalonians and Corinthians, was published. This was entitled St. Paul's Epistles to The Thessalonians and to The Corinthians - A New Translation by the late W.G. Rutherford with a prefatory note by Spencer Wilkinson. That volume contained four epistles.

The entire work, both volumes, were combined into one volume in 1984, reproducing in facsimile the 1908 texts. The reproduction is called "Five Pauline Epistles, A New Translation, by William Gunion Rutherford".

== See also ==
- English translations of the Bible
- List of English Bible translations
