= International Standard Version =

English Bible translation

- Full name: International Standard Version
- Abbreviation: ISV
- Complete Bible published: 2011 (electronic)
- Textual basis: NT: Novum Testamentum Graece 27th edition. OT: Biblia Hebraica Stuttgartensia with influence from Dead Sea Scrolls, Samaritan Pentateuch, Septuagint, Latin Vulgate, Syriac Peshitta, and Aramaic Targums. 1Qlsa for Isaiah.
- Translation type: Mixed formal & dynamic equivalence ("Literal-Idiomatic")
- Copyright: © 2011 The ISV Foundation.
- Genesis 1:1–3 In the beginning, God created the universe. When the earth was yet unformed and desolate, with the surface of the ocean depths shrouded in darkness, and while the Spirit of God was hovering over the surface of the waters, God said, "Let there be light!" So there was light. John 3:16 "For this is how God loved the world: He gave his uniquely existing Son so that everyone who believes in him would not be lost but have eternal life.

The International Standard Version or ISV is an English translation of the Bible for which translation was complete and published electronically in 2011.

The texts of the Dead Sea Scrolls have been used to provide a textual apparatus for understanding the Old Testament.

== Characteristics ==
=== Translation ===
The translation aims to be central between a literal translation and an idiomatic translation, a philosophy the ISV translation team call "literal-idiomatic". A distinctive feature of the ISV is that biblical poetry is translated into English metrical rhyme.

=== Release numbers ===
The Holy Bible: International Standard Version (ISV) is being produced with identifying release numbers and build sequence identifiers so as to provide tracking of improvements and additions to the text. The current release is Release 2.0.

== See also ==
- List of Bible translations
- List of English Bible translations
- English translations of the Bible
- Modern English Bible translations
