= International standard (disambiguation) =

An international standard is a standard developed by an international standards organization.

International Standard may also refer to

- International Standard (dance), a category of ballroom dance
- International Standard Version, an English Bible translation
- International reference standard, a measurement standard
