= 21st Century King James Version =

Update of the King James Version

- Cover of the 21st Century King James Version
- Full name: 21st Century King James Version
- Abbreviation: KJ21
- Complete Bible published: 1994
- Textual basis: Textus Receptus, 57% deviation from Nestle-Aland 27th edition (NT)
- Translation type: 2% paraphrase rate
- Copyright: Copyright 1994 by Deuel Enterprises, Inc., Gary, SD 57237. All rights reserved.
- Genesis 1:1–3 In the beginning God created the heaven and the earth. And the earth was without form and void, and darkness was upon the face of the deep. And the Spirit of God moved upon the face of the waters. And God said, "Let there be light"; and there was light. John 3:16 For God so loved the world that He gave His only begotten Son, that whosoever believeth in Him should not perish, but have everlasting life.

The 21st Century King James Version (KJ21) is an updated version of the King James Version Bible published in 1994 that stays aligned to the Textus Receptus, and does not remove biblical passages based on Alexandrian Greek manuscripts. In contrast to the New King James Version, it does not alter the language significantly from the 1611 King James Version, retaining Jacobean grammar (including "thee" and "thou"), but it does attempt to replace some of the vocabulary that might no longer make sense to a modern reader.

The reader should notice almost no difference from reading the King James Version except that certain archaic words have been replaced with words that are more understandable in modern English. The translation is directed towards readers who are looking for a very conservative King James update, but reduce the use of obsolete words.

A version containing the Apocrypha and without the unusual formatting was released under the name Third Millennium Bible in 1998.

== Background ==
The 21st Century King James Version Bible is an updated version of the King James Version.

== Alterations ==
Unlike the New King James Version, the 21st Century King James Version does not alter the language significantly from the King James Version. The author has eliminated "obsolete words". The changes in words are based on the second edition of the Webster's New International Dictionary. There were no changes related to gender or theology.

Examples comparing changes made by the 21st Century King James Version:

Verse	21st Century King James Version	King James Version
Ezra 9:3	....and sat down **stunned**.	...and sat down **astonied**.
Isaiah 11:8	And the sucking child shall play on the hole of the asp, and the weaned child shall put his hand on the **adder’s** den.	And the sucking child shall play on the hole of the asp, and the weaned child shall put his hand on the **cockatrice'** den.
Luke 11:27	....the **breasts** which thou hast sucked".	...the **paps** which thou hast sucked".
Romans 8:4	that the righteousness of the law might be fulfilled in us, who walk not **according to** the flesh, but **according to** the Spirit.	That the righteousness of the law might be fulfilled in us, who walk not **after** the flesh, but **after** the Spirit.
2 Thessalonians 2:7	For the mystery of iniquity doth already work: only he who now **holdeth back will hold him back, until he is** taken out of the way.	For the mystery of iniquity doth already work: only he who now **letteth will let, until he be** taken out of the way.
Hebrews 13:5	Let your **manner of living** be without covetousness, and be content with such things as ye have. For **He** hath said, “I will never leave thee, nor forsake thee”;	Let your **conversation** be without covetousness; and be content with such things as ye have: for **he** hath said, I will never leave thee, nor forsake thee.

The 21st Century King James Version also contains some distinct formatting. Passages considered "more familiar" are in bold print, while "less familiar" passages are placed in a sans-serif print. Passages from the Revised Common Lectionary are marked with diamonds, and the translations of names are sometimes included with brackets.

The 21st Century King James Version has also been published in an edition with the Apocrypha and without the unusual formatting; this is known as the Third Millennium Bible.
