= William Gunion Rutherford =

Scottish scholar

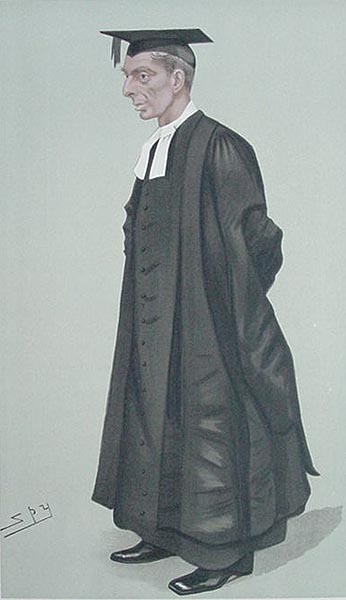
"Westminster" Rutherford as caricatured by Spy (Leslie Ward) in Vanity Fair, March 1898

William Gunion Rutherford (17 July 1853 – 19 July 1907) was a Scottish scholar.

== Life ==
He was born in Peeblesshire on 17 July 1853 and educated at St Andrews and Balliol College, Oxford, where he graduated in natural science. His intention to enter medical profession was abandoned in favour of a scholastic career. From 1883 to 1901 he was Head Master of Westminster School; and his death deprived classical scholarship in the UK of one of its most brilliant modern representatives. He was also a Fellow of University College, Oxford for a time.

=== Work ===
Rutherford devoted special attention to Attic Greek idioms and the language of Aristophanes. His most important work, New Phrynichus (1881), dealing with the Atticisms of Phrynichus Arabius, was supplemented by his Babrius (1883), a specimen of the later Greek language, which was the chief subject of Christian August Lobeck's earlier commentary (1820) on Phrynichus. His edition (1896–1905) of the Aristophanic scholia from the Ravenna manuscript was less successful. Mention may also be made of his Elementary Greek Accidence and Lex Rex, a list of cognate words in Greek, Latin and English.

In the year 1900, Rutherford produced an English translation of some parts of the Bible, called "Five Pauline Epistles – A New Translation." This work was a translation of the books of Romans, first and second Thessalonians, and first and second Corinthians, with a brief analysis.

William G. Rutherford died on 19 July 1907, two days after his 54th birthday.

== Family ==
On 3 January 1884, he married Constance Gordon Renton.
