= The Voice (Bible translation) =

English translation of the Bible

- OT published: April 2012
- NT published: November 2011
- Complete Bible published: April 2012
- Translation type: Dynamic Equivalent
- Reading level: Middle school
- Publisher: Thomas Nelson
- Copyright: 2008, 2011 The Voice, Thomas Nelson
- Genesis 1:1–3 In the beginning, God created everything: the heavens above and the earth below. Here’s what happened: At first the earth lacked shape and was totally empty, and a dark fog draped over the deep while God’s spirit-wind hovered over the surface of the empty waters. Then there was the voice of God. God: Let there be light. And light flashed into being. John 3:16 For God expressed His love for the world in this way: He gave His only Son so that whoever believes in Him will not face everlasting destruction, but will have everlasting life.

The Voice is a modern language, dynamic equivalent English translation of the Bible developed by Thomas Nelson (a subsidiary of News Corp) and the Ecclesia Bible Society. The original New Testament was released in January 2011, the revised and updated New Testament was released in November 2011, and the full Bible was released in April 2012.

== Translation team ==
The team developing The Voice numbered more than 125 scholars, authors and artists. The team included Greek, Hebrew and Latin scholars, Biblical scholars, poets, authors, musicians and pastors.

Interesting features of this translation were the decisions the team made in rendering certain words. The team chose to render:

- The Hebrew Tetragrammaton (e.g., Genesis 2:4) as The Eternal rather than a common title such as The LORD or a transliteration such as Yahweh or Jehovah. (Such a translation rendering is not unique to The Voice; there are other Bible translations such as the Moffatt, New Translation of 1922 that have rendered the Tetragrammaton in this manner.)
- The Greek Logos (e.g., John 1:1) as The Voice rather than The Word which is used in most Bible translations, or the less common Logos as used in such translations as the Moffatt, New Translation of 1922 or the Emphatic Diaglott (a Greek-English Interlinear, first published in 1864 by Benjamin Wilson).
- The Greek Christos (e.g., Matthew 1:1) as the Anointed One instead of Christ. (The Passion Translation also uses the Anointed One.)

== Criticism ==
The Voice has been harshly received by some fundamentalist critics. For instance, Baptist pastor Randy White writes: "The Voice reads like a New Age book. The familiar 'I am the way, the truth, and the life' of John 14:6 is rendered, 'I am the path, the truth, and the energy of life.' This and hundreds of other verses simply ooze with New Age terminology."
