= Lexham English Bible =

Online Bible translation

- Full name: Lexham English Bible
- Abbreviation: LEB
- OT published: 2011
- NT published: 2010
- Textual basis: OT: Biblia Hebraica Stuttgartensia; NT: SBL Greek New Testament
- Translation type: Formal equivalence
- Reading level: High school
- Version revision: 2012
- Publisher: Logos Bible Software
- Copyright: Copyright 2012 Logos Bible Software
- Webpage: lexhampress.com/product/6162/lexham-english-bible-leb-with-audio-new-testament
- Genesis 1:1–3 In the beginning, God created the heavens and the earth— Now the earth was formless and empty, and darkness was over the face of the deep. And the Spirit of God was hovering over the surface of the waters. And God said, “Let there be light!” And there was light. (LEB) John 3:16 For in this way God loved the world, so that he gave his one and only Son, in order that everyone who believes in him will not perish, but will have eternal life. (LEB)

The Lexham English Bible (LEB) is an online Bible released by Logos Bible Software; no printed copy is available for purchase. The New Testament was published in October 2010 and has an audio narration spoken by Marv Allen. It lists as General Editor W. Hall Harris, III. The Old Testament translation was completed in 2011.

At its release, the LEB included only the New Testament and was simultaneously offered for free use to Logos users as well as other popular software suites, including freeware such as e-Sword and The SWORD Project. These were later updated to include the Old Testament. It can also be accessed in its entirety on websites listed below.

An Open-Source project on GitHub uses LaTeX to typeset the translation and freely publishes the PDF file for download. Readers are allowed to print the LEB translation but not to sell it.

The LEB is available under a very permissive license which allows royalty-free commercial and non-commercial use.

== Methodology ==
According to the LEB's foreword, the translator's intent was to achieve:

...unparalleled ... transparency with the original language text. ... It was produced with the specific purpose of being used alongside the original language text of the Bible. Existing translations, however excellent they may be in terms of English style and idiom, are frequently so far removed from the original language texts of scripture that straightforward comparison is difficult for the average user. ... The ability to make such comparisons easily in software formats ... makes the need for an English translation specifically designed for such comparison even more acute.

The LEB is relatively literal and was derived from an interlinear translation of the Greek NT. An unusual feature of the LEB is the use of corner brackets to mark idioms in the English translation. Italics are used to indicate words supplied by the translator with no direct equivalent in the underlying Greek.

In some instances, however, the LEB provides a dynamic equivalent for a word instead of a literal translation, without explanation. For example, in Mark 3:3, the Greek word ἔγειρε (égeire) is translated in the LEB as "come". The literal translation should be "arise" or "get up" or "stand". The LEB does not provide any footnote or explanation as to why a non-literal word is used.
