= Dynamic and formal equivalence =

Two dissimilar translation approaches

Dynamic equivalence and formal equivalence, in translating, is the dichotomy between transparency and fidelity – respectively, between the meaning and the literal structure of a source text.

The dynamic- versus formal-equivalence dichotomy was originally proposed by Eugene Nida in relation to Bible translation.

== Approaches to translation ==
The "formal-equivalence" approach emphasizes fidelity to the lexical details and grammatical structure of the source language, whereas "dynamic equivalence" tends to provide a rendering that is more natural to the target language.

According to Eugene Nida, dynamic equivalence, the term he originally coined, is the quality of a translation in which the message of the original text has been so transported into the receptor language that the response of the receptor is essentially like that of a receptor of the original text. The aim is that a reader of both languages will understand the meaning of the text similarly.

In later years, Nida distanced himself from the term "dynamic equivalence" in favor of "functional equivalence". What the term "functional equivalence" suggests is not just that the equivalence is between the function of the source text in the source culture and the function of the target text (translation) in the target culture, but that "function" can be thought of as a property of the text. It is possible to associate functional equivalence with how people interact in cultures.

A similar distinction was expressed in 1199 by Maimonides in a letter to his translator, Samuel ibn Tibbon. He wrote:

I shall premise one rule: the translator who proposes to render each word literally and adhere slavishly to the order of the words and sentences in the original, will meet with much difficulty and the result will be doubtful and corrupt. This is not the right method. The translator should first try to grasp the meaning of the subject, and then state the theme with perfect clarity in the other language. This, however, cannot be done without changing the order of words, putting many words for one word, and vice versa, so that the subject be perfectly intelligible in the language into which he translates.

Maimonides comes down on the side of dynamic/functional equivalence, though perhaps not going so far as to consider the cultural function of the text. He does clearly reject formal equivalence as "doubtful and corrupt".

== Theory and practice ==
Because the functional equivalence approach eschews strict adherence to the grammatical structure of the original text in favor of a more natural rendering in the target language, it is sometimes used when the readability of the translation is more important than the preservation of the original grammatical structure.

Formal equivalence is often more goal than reality, if only because one language may contain a word for a concept which has no direct equivalent in another language. In such cases, a more dynamic translation may be used or a neologism may be created in the target language to represent the concept (sometimes by borrowing a word from the source language).

The more the source language differs from the target language, the more difficult it may be to understand a literal translation without modifying or rearranging the words in the target language. On the other hand, formal equivalence can allow readers familiar with the source language to analyze how meaning was expressed in the original text, preserving untranslated idioms, rhetorical devices (such as chiastic structures in the Hebrew Bible) and diction in order to preserve original information and highlight finer shades of meaning.

== Minor differences between approximate equivalents ==
Sandy Habib observed how the Arabic, Hebrew and English words for angel have slightly varying connotations. This leads to religio-cultural differences over questions such as whether angels are immortal or capable of doing evil, and their appearance (e.g. the colour of their wings). Due to his focus upon natural semantic metalanguage, Ghil'ad Zuckermann considers such minute distinctions between lexical items in different languages to be a major obstacle in producing translations that are both accurate and concise.

== Bible translation ==
Translators of the Bible have taken various approaches in rendering it into English, ranging from an extreme use of formal equivalence, to extreme use of dynamic equivalence.

Predominant use of formal equivalence

- Douay–Rheims Bible (1610)
- King James Bible (1611)
- Young's Literal Translation (1862)
- Revised Version (1885)
- American Standard Version (1901)
- Concordant Version (1926)
- Revised Standard Version (1952)
- Revised Standard Version Catholic Edition (1966)
- New American Standard Bible (1971)
- New King James Version (1982)
- Green's Literal Translation (1985)
- New Jewish Publication Society Tanakh (1985)
- New Revised Standard Version (1989)
- Orthodox Study Bible (1993)
- Third Millennium Bible (1998)
- Recovery Version (1999)
- World English Bible (2000)
- English Standard Version (2001)
- Lexham English Bible (2011)
- Modern English Version (2014)
- Tree of Life Version (2014)
- Literal Standard Version (2020)

Moderate use of both formal and dynamic equivalence

- New World Translation of the Holy Scriptures (1961, revised 1984, 2013)
- Confraternity Bible (1969)
- Modern Language Bible (1969)
- New American Bible (1970, revised 1986 & 1991)
- New International Version (1978)
- Holman Christian Standard Bible called "optimal equivalence" (2004)
- New Community Bible (2008)
- Common English Bible (2011)
- New American Bible Revised Edition (2011)
- Christian Standard Bible (2017)
- Evangelical Heritage Version (2019)
- New Catholic Bible / New Catholic Version (St. Joseph New Catholic Bible) (2019)
- Revised New Jerusalem Bible (2019)

Extensive use of dynamic equivalence or paraphrase or both

- Knox Bible (1955)
- Amplified Bible (1965)
- Jerusalem Bible (1966)
- New Life Version (1969)
- New English Bible (1970)
- Good News Bible (1976)
- New Jerusalem Bible (1985)
- Easy-to-Read Version (1987)
- Christian Community Bible (1988)
- Revised English Bible (1989)
- God's Word Translation (1995)
- Contemporary English Version (1995)
- New Living Translation (1996)
- Complete Jewish Bible (1998)
- New International Reader's Version (1998)
- New English Translation (2005)
- Today's New International Version (2005)

Extensive use of paraphrase

- The Living Bible (1971)
- The Street Bible (UK) (2003), as the word on the street (US) (2004)
- The Message Bible (2002)
- The Voice (2012)
- The Passion Translation (2017)

== See also ==
- Bible concordance
- Bible version debate
- Exploratory data analysis
- Lexical markup framework
- Idiom (language structure)
- Natural semantic metalanguage
- Textualism in jurisprudence:
  - Original meaning (cf. formal equivalence)
  - Original intent (cf. dynamic equivalence)
  - Purposivism (also called purposive theory)
