= Gerrit Verkuyl =

Gerrit Verkuijl or Gerrit Verkuyl (18 September 1872, Haarlemmermeer – 19 March 1967, Alameda, California) was a New Testament Greek scholar and Bible Translator. He emigrated from the Netherlands to the United States at 21, becoming a farmhand in California. He later went to college, earning degrees from Park College of Kansas City, Princeton University, and the University of Leipzig.

He became a minister in the Presbyterian church, serving as a pastor in Philadelphia, then working for the Board of Education of the PC(USA). "This brought him in contact with young people throughout the country and resulted in his seeing the need for a Bible translation in up-to-date language."

He moved to Berkeley, California, to work on his translation, hence the name of his New Testament translation, Berkeley Version. It was based on Tischendorf's eighth edition of the Greek text. However, it has been pointed out that he was not totally consistent on this.

Verkuyl explained his work, motivation, and methods in an article published in The Bible Translator in 1951.

Fourteen years later, this translation was revised with a team that included Frank E. Gaebelein, E. Schuyler, and G. Henry Waterman. The revised version, with the Old Testament included, was published in 1969 titled, The Modern Language Bible: New Berkeley Version, Revised Edition. F. F. Bruce described it as "The most outstanding among recent translations" by private groups.

Verkuyl wrote books, also, including some related to ministry to younger people, a reflection of why he did his translation.

Verkuyl has been considered significant enough to be included in a book of "Hollanders who helped build America.

== Books by Verkuyl ==
- Children's Devotions (1917),
- Scripture Memory Work (1918),
- Devotional Leadership (1925),
- Things Most Surely Believed (1926),
- Qualifying Men for Church Work (1927),
- Adolescent Worship (1929),
- Christ in the Home (1932),
- Christ in American Education (1934),
- Reclaim those Unitarian Wastes (1935),
- Young People's Worship (1950).
