= Contemporary English Version =

Translation of the Bible into English

- Full name: Contemporary English Version
- Other names: Bible for Today's Family
- Abbreviation: CEV
- OT published: 1995
- NT published: 1991
- Complete Bible published: 1995
- Translation type: Dynamic equivalence
- Copyright: American Bible Society 1991, 1992, 1995; Anglicizations British and Foreign Bible Society 1996
- Website: cev.bible
- Genesis 1:1–3 In the beginning God created the heavens and the earth. The earth was barren, with no form of life; it was under a roaring ocean covered with darkness. But the Spirit of God was moving over the water. God said, "I command light to shine!" And light started shining. John 3:16 God loved the people of this world so much that he gave his only Son, so that everyone who has faith in him will have eternal life and never really die.

The Contemporary English Version or CEV (also known as Bible for Today's Family) is a translation of the Bible into English, published by the American Bible Society. An anglicized version was produced by the British and Foreign Bible Society, which includes metric measurements for the Commonwealth market.

== History ==
The CEV project began as a result of studies conducted by Barclay Newman in 1985 regarding the speech patterns used in books, magazines, newspapers, and television. These studies focused on how English was read and heard. This led to a series of test volumes being published in the late 1980s and early 1990s. Among the volumes published were Luke Tells the Good News About Jesus (1987), The Good News Travels Fast – The Acts of the Apostles (1988), A Few Who Dared to Trust God (1990), and A Book About Jesus (1991). In 1991, the 175th anniversary of the American Bible Society, the CEV New Testament was released. The CEV Old Testament was released in 1995. In 1999, the Deuterocanonical books were published.

The CEV is sometimes mischaracterized as a revision of the Good News Bible, but is a new translation designed for a lower reading level than the GNB. The American Bible Society continues to promote both translations. Its lower reading level is not intended to dilute script or convey lesser intellect for understanding, it is written reflecting the change of language usage over time, under the principles of its translation.

== Translation principles ==
The translators of the CEV followed three principles. They were that the CEV:

- must be understood by people without stumbling in speech
- must be understood by those with little or no comprehension of "Bible" language, and
- must be understood by all.

The CEV uses gender-neutral language for humanity, though not for God.

The translation simplifies Biblical terminology into more everyday words and phrases. An example can be found in Exodus 20:14, where the prohibition against committing adultery is rendered positively in terms of being faithful in marriage.

Moreover, the CEV often paraphrases in order to make the underlying point of a passage clear, rather than directly translating the wording. For example, compare Psalm 127:1 in the (much more literal) New International Version:

Unless the LORD builds the house, the builders labor in vain. Unless the LORD watches over the city, the guards stand watch in vain.

with the much shorter summary given by the CEV:

Without the help of the LORD it is useless to build a home or to guard a city.

Or verses 4 & 5 in the New International Version:

Like arrows in the hands of a warrior are children born in one’s youth. Blessed is the man whose quiver is full of them. They will not be put to shame when they contend with their opponents in court.

are rendered in the CEV as:

Having a lot of children to take care of you in your old age is like a warrior with a lot of arrows. The more you have, the better off you will be, because they will protect you when your enemies attack with arguments.

Here, rather than shortening the original, the CEV has introduced new material by way of explanation, such as 'to take care of you in your old age'.

The CEV translates the Greek phrase hoi Ioudaioi (literally, "the Jews") as "the Jewish leaders", especially in the Gospel of John (as in John 18:14). The CEV translators believe that the Greek phrase hoi Ioudaioi in the Gospel of John primarily refers to the Jewish leadership (as in John 6:41).

== Usages ==
- In the aftermath of the September 11, 2001 attacks, the American Bible Society published a special booklet titled God Is Our Shelter and Strength. The booklet contained passages from the Psalms and other parts of the Bible. This booklet was also published after the Hurricane Katrina disaster in September 2005.
- In October 2005, the Bible Society in Australia launched a project called SMSBible, which was the entire CEV in SMS text messages. News reports about the service claimed that the Bible spanned more than 30,000 text messages.
- On October 25, 2005, a church in New Zealand began a project called PodBible to produce an audio version of the CEV available via podcast or webcast.
- In 2009, through the UCCF 'FREE Gospel Project' 400,000 copies of the book of Mark in CEV were handed out at over 150 universities in the UK.

== Sources ==
- Sheeley, Stephen M. and Nash, Robert N. Choosing a Bible. pp. 55–56.
- Metzger, Bruce M. The Bible In Translation. p. 171.

Some of the information in this article comes from an email inquiry by Wikipedian Joshua Holman to Jacquelyn Sapiie, Supervisor of Library Services at the American Bible Society on February 9, 2004.

== See also ==
- History of the English Bible
- Bible translations
- Other English translations in contemporary language:
  - Good News Bible
  - New Century Version
  - New Living Translation
  - Revised English Bible
  - The Message
- American Bible Society
