= Easy-to-Read Version =

Version of the Bible

- Full name: Holy Bible: Easy-to-Read Version
- Abbreviation: ERV
- Language: English
- Complete Bible published: 1987
- Copyright: Copyright by World Bible Translation Center
- Genesis 1:1–3 God made the sky and earth. At first, the earth was completely empty; nothing was on the earth. Darkness covered the ocean, and God’s Spirit moved over the water. Then God said, "Let there be light!" And light began to shine. John 3:16 Yes, God loved the world so much that he gave his only Son. God gave his Son so that every person that believes in him would not be lost, but have life forever.

The Holy Bible: Easy-to-Read Version (ERV) is an English translation of the Bible compiled by the World Bible Translation Center. It was originally published as the English Version for the Deaf (EVD) by BakerBooks.

== History ==
Some Deaf readers struggle with reading English because of their limited exposure to that language. The World Bible Translation Center (WBTC) decided to do a translation that would make reading the Bible easier for them. The EVD uses simpler vocabulary and shorter sentences to make it more simple to understand. The English Version for the Deaf (EVD), and its second cover, the Easy to Read Version (ERV) were translated by Ervin Bishop (Greek Language Translator), David Stringham (Hebrew Language Translator) and Benton L Dibrell (Deaf Language Specialist, Interpreter, and Translator). The translators used a thought-for-thought or functional equivalence method of translation. It was found to be useful for others who struggle with reading and is often used in prisons and literacy programs.

The ERV uses the Biblia Hebraica Stuttgartensia (1984) as its Old Testament text with some readings from the Dead Sea Scrolls. It also follows the Septuagint, an ancient Greek translation of the Hebrew scriptures, when its readings are considered more accurate. For the New Testament revisions, the ERV uses the United Bible Societies' Greek New Testament (fourth revised edition, 1993) and Nestle-Aland Novum Testamentum Graece (twenty-seventh edition, 1993).

The EVD New Testament was completed and published by Baker Books in 1978. The Old Testament was completed in 1986. The entire compilation of both Old and New Testaments was published as both the 'English Version for the Deaf' and the 'Easy to Read Version' (primarily for individuals for whom English is a second language) in 1987. In 2004, a major revision of the ERV was finished. It used broader vocabulary and greater use of gender-inclusive language. The EVD was left unchanged, so it and the ERV now have different texts. Apps for reading both Bibles are available from the WBTC's website, the full text is available online via various Bible aggregator portals.

== Criticism ==
The ERV caused a slight bit of controversy among a small number of lay members of the Churches of Christ (the WBTC is an outreach of the Churches of Christ). Goebel Music wrote a lengthy book critiquing this translation titled "Easy-to-Read Version: Easy to Read or Easy to Mislead?", criticizing the ERV's method of translation, textual basis, and wording of certain passages. Music’s book, in turn, received criticism, as he holds no credentials with which to criticize the translators of the ERV, and seemed to have a lack of awareness regarding the stated purpose of the translators. The critique was not well-received by scholars.

== See also ==
- List of English Bible translations
