= Berkeley Version =

- Full name: The Berkeley Version in Modern English
- Abbreviation: BV
- Language: English
- Complete Bible published: 1959
- Copyright: Copyright by Zondervan Publishing House
- Genesis 1:1–3 In the beginning God created the heavens and the earth. The earth was formless and empty, and darkness lay upon the face of the deep, and the Spirit of God was moving over the surface of the waters. God said: Let there be light, and there was light. John 3:16 For God so loved the world that He gave His only-begotten Son, so that whoever believes in Him should not perish but have everlasting life.

The Berkeley Version is an English translation of the Bible. The New Testament was published by Zondervan in 1945 and an entire Bible was published in 1959. A revised version was published as the New Berkeley Version or Modern Language Bible in 1969.

According to editor-in-chief Gerrit Verkuyl: "The conviction that God wants His truth conveyed to His offspring in the language in which they think and live led me to produce the Berkeley Version (BV) of the New Testament. For I grew increasingly aware that the King James Version (AV) is only, in part, the language of our people."
