= Evangelical Heritage Version =

Translation of the Bible

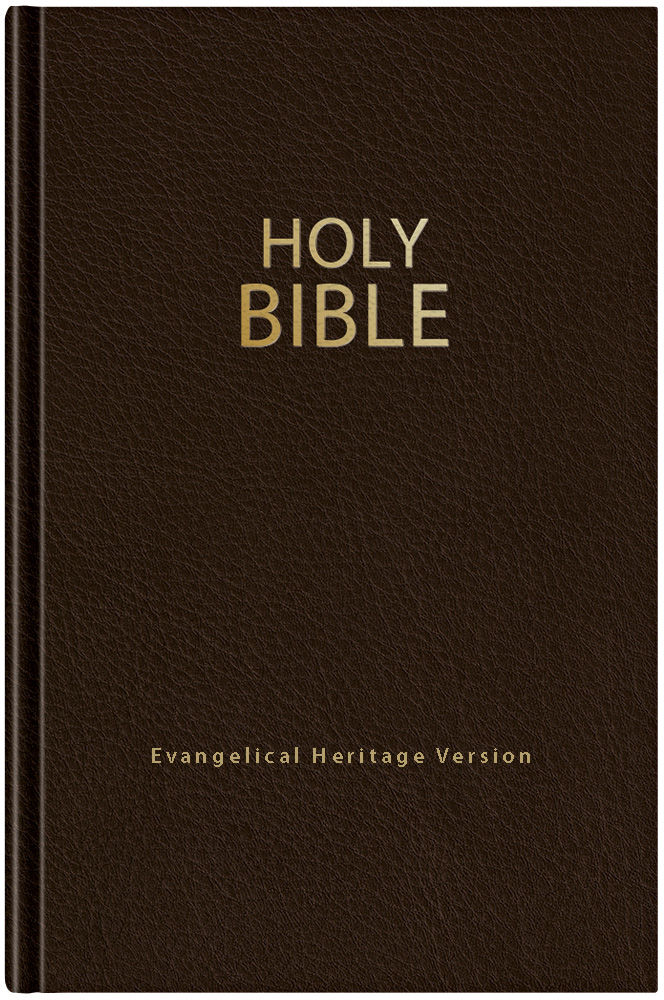
- Full name: Evangelical Heritage Version
- Abbreviation: EHV
- Language: English
- OT published: 2019
- NT published: 2017
- Complete Bible published: 2019
- Textual basis: OT: Various. Includes Masoretic Text, and Biblia Hebraica Stuttgartensia. NT: Various. Includes Textus Receptus and Novum Testamentum Graecae. See Translation Methodology
- Translation type: Optimal equivalence
- Publisher: Northwestern Publishing House
- Copyright: 2017
- Religious affiliation: Lutheran
- Website: wartburgproject.org
- Genesis 1:1–3 "In the beginning, God created the heavens and the earth. The earth was undeveloped and empty. Darkness covered the surface of the deep, and the Spirit of God was hovering over the surface of the waters. God said, "Let there be light," and there was light. John 3:16 "For God so loved the world that he gave his only-begotten Son, that whoever believes in him shall not perish, but have eternal life."

The Evangelical Heritage Version (EHV) is a translation of the Bible into the English language. The translation project was called The Wartburg Project and the group of translators consisted of pastors, professors, and teachers from the Wisconsin Evangelical Lutheran Synod (WELS) and Evangelical Lutheran Synod (ELS), both based in the United States.

The Bible translation began in 2013 due to the relative lack of a commonly accepted translation, especially among Lutherans, compared to the historical popularity of the King James Version (KJV) and New International Version (NIV), due in part to the replacement of the 1984 version of the NIV by the 2011 version and the aging language used in the KJV.

A New Testament and Psalms version of the EHV was first published in the summer of 2017 and the full version of the EHV Bible was first published in 2019 by Northwestern Publishing House.

A study Bible with extensive notes and other resources is available digitally on the Microsoft Store in American and metric editions and in Logos Bible Software. A hardcover version is published by Northwestern Publishing House.

== History ==
Although WELS never had an official translation, prior to 2011 most WELS churches, as well as Northwestern Publishing House (NPH), used the version of the NIV from 1984. In 2011, an updated version of the NIV was published. Many members of the WELS and ELS had concerns about the accuracy of the newer translation; however, the older version was no longer being printed. A committee of the ELS focused on doctrine suggested the use of the New King James Version, the English Standard Version, Beck's American Translation, and the New American Standard Bible. In their 2013 biennial synod convention, a committee established by the WELS to evaluate Bible translations and give suggestions to their translators advised the use of the NIV 2011, Holman Christian Standard Bible, and English Standard Version in their publications, considering which would most accurately fit the needs of each publication. The convention also considered creating its own translation, but decided against it because of the cost and other factors. Some WELS delegates suggested that a translation could be attempted by a parasynodical organization.

The Wartburg Project began their work in September 2013 under the leadership of John F. Brug, a professor-emeritus of systematic theology and the Old Testament at the Wisconsin Lutheran Seminary, and Brian R. Keller, a WELS pastor. Although the project is mostly led by pastors and teachers from the WELS, with some from the ELS, the EHV is not owned by or funded by the WELS or ELS.

Over 100 volunteers have joined the project, including professors and pastors from the WELS and ELS as well as laypeople to help in other areas such as proofreading.

The Wartburg Project was named after the German Bible translation Martin Luther made (known today as the Luther Bible) while he was in hiding at the Wartburg Castle. This was the first widely used Bible translation into the German language, the common language of Luther's people, because of its accuracy and because it was easily understood by the common people speaking many dialects of German, and has influenced many later translations.

== Translation methodology ==
The goal of the Wartburg Project is to create a balanced, accurate translation, as described in their translation rubrics.

The translators are using a variety of ancient manuscripts to ensure accuracy. Rather than selecting one side of the common textual criticism debates, they have elected to use a combination of the texts. Where they disagree, they favor more complete passages, or the older tradition. They also wish to use history to better understand the context and original meaning of the original Greek and Hebrew texts. In addition, they are using other English translations and commentaries to help them develop this historical context and to help them preserve heritage terms.

The translators' other major goal is to create a balanced translation. They are hoping for a balance between old and new by keeping traditional terminology, but replacing it where it is no longer an accurate representation of the original, and by balancing literal (which can be inaccurate or unclear in a different language) and dynamic (which may not stay closely enough to the original meaning) translation.

A final goal is for the translation to be easily readable and understandable to people from a wide range of religious backgrounds and grammatically correct, while maintaining its main goals.

== Published works ==
A New Testament and Psalms version of the EHV was published in the summer of 2017 and is available at Northwestern Publishing House and with online versions through Amazon Kindle and Nook. The New Testament and Psalms are also available at Bible Gateway. The translation of the full Bible is completed and was given to NPH for publishing on October 31, 2017. Hardcover copies were made available at the end of June 2019. It is available on Kindle and Nook. Other materials, such as lectionary series and a passion history, are available at the Wartburg Project's website. They have also published an exposition of Luther's Small Catechism, which was released in the fall of 2019, and a study bible in both electronic and hardcover forms. They have also supported the use of their translation in other works, such as musical compositions.
