= Adolph Ernst Knoch =

American theologian and translator of the Concordant Version of the Bible

Adolph Ernst Knoch (December 19, 1874 – March 28, 1965) was the author of numerous theological writings and a Bible publisher.

Knoch founded the Concordant Publishing Concern and translated the Concordant Version of the Bible.

== Life ==
Knoch was raised in a German-speaking part of Missouri, born in St. Louis, Missouri as the son of Adolph Knoch, who had emigrated from Germany to the United States . One of his sisters, Addie, remained in Germany. Knoch grew up bilingually: in his parents' house only German was spoken; Knoch learned English only at school.

In 1885 the family moved to Los Angeles, where he completed high school in 1893. One of the teachers apparently told him that he had literary talent, and he should study great literature such as Shakespeare or the Bible. Since works by Shakespeare were not available, the young Knoch read in the family Bible. While at school, and thereafter (a total of around 20 years), he worked as a printer in the company of his brother.

As part of a job, he came with a group, the "Plymouth Brethren", part of the Brethren Movement. Tutor McClure led Knoch in this group. He concurred with the teachings and was baptized. Because of his interest in languages, in 1900 at the Bible Institute of Los Angeles, he studied "Ancient Greek, the NT in the proto-reading". In 1901 Knoch compared his translation output with the new American Standard Revised Version; he was disappointed.

During this time he began developing a form of his concordant method of Bible translation. In the "Plymouth Brethren" he met Olive Hyde, another religious teacher; they married in April 1903. Knoch began to give Greek courses at the local YMCA. He discovered what he believed were additional mistakes in traditional translations and increasingly taught from the Greek to avoid teaching that of which he no longer was totally convinced. He began applying his systematic program with Biblical Greek to his writing work. On November 5, 1907, his son Ernest Oliver was born.

Dr. Ethelbert William Bullinger, publisher of the magazine in England, "Things to Come", in 1906 published a few articles from Knoch. Russian Vladimir Gelesnoff, living in the United States, read the articles and contacted Knoch. Together they published the magazine "Grace and Glory", but for only eight issues in 1909. It appeared some time later they made some changes and moved to the title known today as "Unsearchable Riches", particularly regarding dispensationalism and detailed word studies. Knoch concentrated on the Greek New Testament, while Gelesnoff processed the Hebrew Old Testament. Knoch was subsequently published in various books and writings. Knoch's methodology used thousands of index cards on which all occurrences of each Greek word were listed.

After his brother had sold the print shop, Knoch worked there for some years, until the printer began accepting print jobs related to war. Knoch refused such assignments and, together with another employee (Herman Vogel), was dismissed until a contract to print tickets was purchased. Knoch worked there a few months until he decided to work full-time for his religious beliefs. Bird later printed the magazine Unsearchable Riches and the Bible Concordant Version, as is still the case.

Knoch was primarily a compiler, since the Bible is based on Greek-designated experts such as George L. Rogers (Almont, Michigan), Edward H. Clayton (Sheffield, England) and Earl Taber and many others. The Bible was first released in several parts, starting in 1919 with Revelation; the complete Concordant Translation of the New Testament was published in 1926. Later editions were published in 1944 and 1966, reflecting corrections by contributors such as Alexander Thomson.

In 1926, Knoch's wife died. In 1930, Knoch traveled to Germany to visit some German evangelists with whom he maintained contact. At certain events, translations of his articles were read. On 25 May 1937, he married Sigrid Charlotte Marie Gräfin von Kanitz (born 1876 in Germany) in Potsdam.

Sigrid Knoch translated the next article of her husband for the German Unsearchable Riches. Now in the United States, they decided to return to Germany to develop the German version of the Concordant Translation, at the house of Baroness Wally Bissingen; it was released in 1939 in Berlin.

In 1939, the American government urged U.S. nationals to return to the United States, including Knoch, because of the impending war. According to its records, Knoch was under observation by the FBI during the Second World War because of his marriage to a German and his frequent contacts with Germany (Act no. 100-20677; Verdict: safe). On March 28, 1965 AE Knoch died in Los Angeles California.

== Theology ==
Knoch's work on the Concordant Bible translation led to the development of his theological beliefs.

He came to the conclusion that some doctrines, which his church had required him to believe, resulted conspicuously from inaccurate or incorrect translations of the Bible, and Knoch discarded them.

These include, for example, teaching about Hell.

Though in a revised form, but still in principle, he retained the strong dispensationalism of the Brethren Movement (developed by Darby), and the two different gospels for the Jews and the Nations.

The views of Ethelbert William Bullinger may also have influenced him. Knoch was put off by the doctrine of the Trinity, saying that its sense of Divinity of Jesus Christ as being equal with God the Father is not biblical.

Knoch's views on what happens to a person at death are different from the teachings of most other Christians: "Unless our Lord comes, the souls of all believers will return to hades, as their spirits return to God, and the bodies return to the soil. Death is still a return. Our bodies came from the soil and may return thither. Our spirits came from God and must return to Him. Our souls came from hades ("hell!") and they cannot possibly return elsewhere!"

== Works ==
- Concordant Literal New Testament, Concordant Publishing Concern
- Unsearchable Riches
- All in All: the Goal of the Universe
- The Problem of Evil and the Judgments of God
- The Mystery of the Gospel
