= Concordant Version =

English translation of the Bible

- Full name: Concordant Version
- Other names: Concordant Version: The Sacred Scriptures
- Abbreviation: CVOT, CLNT
- Language: English
- Complete Bible published: 1926
- Translation type: Extreme formal equivalence, nearly interlinear in tone
- Version revision: 1931, 1966
- Publisher: Concordant Publishing Concern (CPC)
- Copyright: Concordant Publishing Concern
- Website: concordant.org
- Genesis 1:1–3 In a beginning Elohim created the heavens and the earth. As for the earth, it came to be a chaos and vacant, and darkness was over the surface of the abyss. And the spirit of Elohim was vibrating over the surface of the waters. And Elohim said: Let light come to be! And light came to be. John 3:16 For thus God loves the world, so that He gives His only-begotten Son, that everyone who is believing in Him should not be perishing, but may be having life age-abiding.

The Concordant Version is an English translation of the Bible compiled by the Concordant Publishing Concern (CPC), which was founded by Adolph Ernst Knoch in 1909. The principal works of the CPC is the Concordant Literal New Testament with Keyword Concordance (CLNT), and the Concordant Version of the Old Testament (CVOT). Knoch designed the Concordant Version to put English readers lacking formal knowledge of Koine Greek in possession of all the vital facts of the most ancient codices: Codex Vaticanus, Codex Sinaiticus, and Codex Alexandrinus. The CPC's efforts yielded a restored Greek text, titled The Concordant Greek Text, containing all of the important variant readings found in the codices mentioned above. This was done with the intent of conforming, as far as possible, to the original autograph manuscripts. An utterly consistent hyper-literal sub-linear based upon a standard English equivalent for each Greek element is to be found beneath each Greek word. The Concordant Greek Text forms the basis of the CLNT, which is more idiomatic in its English than the hyper-literal sublinear. The CLNT and the Concordant Greek Text are linked together and correlated for the English reader by means of an English concordance—the Keyword Concordance—and a complementary list of the Greek elements.

With the use of the concordant method of translation, the CPC endeavored to recognize the importance of the vocabulary of Scripture, keeping distinct the words used in the original languages by giving each Greek word—as far as is possible—its own unique and consistent English equivalent. While acknowledging that absolute consistency cannot be achieved in the making of an idiomatic English version, the introduction to the Sixth edition of the Concordant Literal New Testament states that the CLNT, by being harmonious with the original texts, keeps to a minimum the confusion resulting from translating different Greek words with the same English word, or one Greek word with many English words. It is this principle of consistent or concordant translation which was also employed in the compilation of the Concordant Version of the Old Testament (CVOT), now completed. Therefore, with the exception of occasional idiomatic variants, each English word in the Concordant Version does exclusive duty for a single Greek or Hebrew word. Thus, according to the CPC, a substantial formal correspondence is maintained between the source languages and the receptor language.

The CPC describes what distinguishes its work from that of others in an article titled About the Concordant Publishing Concern, published on its website:

Our research efforts are centered upon the many issues involved in discovering the meaning of the original Scripture declarations themselves. Then we seek to determine how we may best translate these same Scriptures, endeavoring to do so objectively, accurately, and consistently. Our translation principles, both of vocabulary and grammatical analysis, govern all that we do.

We first seek to determine essence of word meaning; wherever possible, according to internal scriptural evidence. For each Greek word, then, we assign a STANDARD English word. To facilitate a readable English translation, additional synonyms or other concordant variants are also used, as needed. In nearly all cases, any such standards, synonyms, and variants are used exclusively for a single word in the Original, thereby eliminating almost all "crosswiring" between languages ... It is such very principles of translation themselves, together with our many years of refining our efforts according to these principles, which distinguish our work, and its results, from that of others.

In the CLNT, the CPC utilizes special typographic devices in an effort to display the actual grammatical features of the Greek New Testament, rather than merely an interpretation of said features. These devices may be categorized as follows: (1) lightface and boldface type to indicate when an English word is inserted to complete the sense, (2) symbols for the verb, and (3) distinctive signs and abbreviations for other grammatical elements. Similar devices are used in the CVOT, in which boldface type, symbols and capital letters indicate the words actually found in the Hebrew text, and lightface type indicate English words added for clarity. Textual emendations are also noted. The extreme care taken by the CPC demonstrates the "high" view of Scriptural inspiration that guided its efforts.

In the interests of neutrality and objectivity, it is a fair and truthful statement that the Concordant Version is significantly more difficult to use than most other versions of the Bible. It requires regular use and study to become familiar and comfortable with its exacting vocabulary and syntax, and competent in the use of its many features. The CLNT is not an "easy reader", and its compilers expected its users to have a good grasp of English, and an interest in concerted study rather than light reading. One may inspect the complete text of the CLNT, without the various typographic symbols, online at the website of the Concordant Publishing Concern.

The CVOT is published in five volumes, each with an introduction explaining the features employed by it, as well as the method of translation used to produce it.

== New Testament editions ==
The first tentative installments of this translation of the New Testament appeared in 1914 under the title Concordant Version. These were withdrawn the following year because they failed to reach the quality desired. In 1915 Knoch chose a new title, Standard Version. However, the publishers of the American Standard Edition of the Revised Version (ASV) voiced objection, and Knoch reestablished the title as Concordant Version. From 1919 until 1926 the CV was issued in parts beginning with Revelation. The second edition was a pocket edition printed in 1927. The third revised edition (1931) was similar to the 1926 edition with Greek text and notes, but included the Lexicon and Concordance and The Greek Elements. It retained the title – Concordant Version: The Sacred Scriptures. The fourth edition appeared in 1944 and followed the publication of a Concordant Version in Germany in 1939 (the current German edition has the title Konkordantes Neues Testament). The corresponding English version was then called the Revised, International Edition. The revision printed in 1966 was designated The Memorial Edition in honor of the compiler, Knoch, who died on March 28, 1965. At this time the translation was given a new title – Concordant Literal New Testament. A revised and updated edition was released in 1976, with several subsequent printings.

== The Concordant Greek Text ==
Several years of research resulted in a Greek text which gives the readings of the three most ancient codices: Alexandrinus, Vaticanus, and Sinaiticus, generally referred to as A, B, and the Hebrew letter Aleph (which the CPC designates as s), and readings from other sources. The CPC decided to base its comparisons on Weymouth's Resultant Greek Text. Richard Francis Weymouth based his text on editors of the nineteenth century: Lachmann, Tregelles, Tischendorf, Lightfoot, Weiss, Alford, Ellicott, Stockmeyer & Riggenbach, the Revisers, and Westcott & Hort. Weymouth's apparatus was also consulted which gives the results of Stunica, Erasmus, Stephens, Elziver and Scrivener.

The work was done as follows: Photographic facsimiles of each of the ancient manuscripts were compared with a copy of the text of Weymouth's The Resultant Greek Testament, and every variation was noted in it. Then another copy of Weymouth's text was cut up and pasted, line for line, on large sheets of paper which were bound together as a book. Space was left between each line, so that all the variations could be entered in place, above the words. If another reading was preferred instead of Weymouth's, the notation above the line was changed accordingly. The principles on which this text was constructed are explained in the introduction to the Concordant Greek Text. This volume of the Concordant Library contains every word and letter of A, B, s, Codex Vaticanus 2066 (046) for the Apocalypse, and some recently discovered fragments of Papyri. Variant readings in these manuscripts are shown in the Greek text, referred to as the super-linear. A uniform, hyper-literal word-for-word English sub-linear translation is given below the Greek text. The Greek text is printed in the ancient uncial letters as found in the most ancient manuscripts.

The edition of the CLNT printed in 1966 reflects significant revision work and minor original translation work by Herman Rocke and Dean Hough. The 1976 edition, which is the current edition, contains further refinements.

== Reliable Secondary Sources ==
The 1936 book Studies in Paul's Epistle to the Romans by George Lawley Rogers is an in-depth examination of the Epistle to the Romans utilizing the Concordant Version; though out of print, used copies are available.

== Others involved ==
The names of some of those who assisted Knoch during the various phases of the preparation work on the CLNT are as follows: Melville Dozier (Superintendent of Schools in Los Angeles), J. H. Breckenridge (Attorney for the Irvine Ranch) who advised on legal matters, C. P. Wilcox of Long Beach, Horace M. Conrad of South Pasadena, who assisted with proofreading, Mrs. Gibson and Mrs. Walker, who prepared the slips for the card index system, Dr. Emma Lucas, Earl Taber, Vi E. Olin, Edna Parr, Dr. and Mrs. W. S. Bagley, Pastor George L. Rogers of Almont, Michigan, who served as an expert on the Greek verb and assisted with type, David Mann, Frank Neil Pohorlak (later known as Dr. Pohorlak), Alexander Thomson of Scotland, Edward H. Clayton of England, who served as an advisor in translation matters, Ben Bredimus and Mr. and Mrs. Joseph Kirk of Seattle and Adlai Loudy.

== See also ==
- Bible concordance
- Dynamic and formal equivalence
