= W. Hall Harris III =

American scholar

W. Hall Harris III (born 1952) is an American scholar who is the editor of two modern freely-licensed bible translations, the NET Bible and the Lexham English Bible, and was a contributor to the New American Standard Bible 1995 Update. Harris encourages the use of software and web resources for biblical study and teaching. The NET Bible, begun in 1995, was intended as the first freely-available online Bible.

== Education ==
He completed his Ph.D. at the University of Sheffield (1989) and is currently Senior Professor of New Testament Studies at Dallas Theological Seminary.

== Publications ==
Harris has published The Descent of Christ: Ephesians 4:7-11 and Traditional Hebrew Imagery (AGJU 32); 1, 2, 3 John - Comfort and Counsel for a Church in Crisis; Lexham Greek-English Interlinear New Testament; and Lexham Greek-English New Testament: SBL Edition.
