= InterVarsity Press =

American publisher of Christian books

- Parent company: InterVarsity Christian Fellowship
- Founded: 1947
- Country of origin: United States
- Headquarters location: Lisle, Illinois
- Key people: Terumi Echols
- Publication types: Books
- Imprints: IVP, IVP Academic, IVP Bible Studies, IVP Español, IVP Formatio, IVP Kids
- Official website: www.ivpress.com

Founded in 1947, InterVarsity Press (IVP) is a Christian publisher located in Lisle, Illinois. IVP focuses on publishing Christian books and digital resources that discuss influential cultural moments, provide tools for mental growth through a Christian framework, and equip pastors, professors, and ministry leaders in their work. It is a subsidiary of InterVarsity Christian Fellowship.

== History ==
=== Beginning years ===
InterVarsity Press began just before World War II as a small service branch of the InterVarsity Christian Fellowship campus ministry, which had its beginnings in the 1939–1940 academic year. At its inception, InterVarsity Press solely imported books from the Great Britain InterVarsity Christian Fellowship movement for use by college students and InterVarsity chapters in the United States. Its first home-grown publications was a Bible study guide called Discovering the Gospel of Mark, written by an InterVarsity staff member and published in the 1933–1934 academic year. In 1947, a formal publishing program was established; its distribution of books was handled by Fleming H. Revell until 1960.

=== Move to Chicago ===
In 1960, IVP's editorial offices moved from Havertown, Pennsylvania, to Chicago, where InterVarsity Christian Fellowship offices were then located. In 1966, offices were moved from Chicago to Downers Grove, approximately 30 miles west.

=== Expansion ===
In 1968 Jim Nyquist became IVP's full-time director and Jim Sire became IVP's first full-time editor. Four other full-time employees filled out the staff. Shortly afterward, IVP began publishing Francis Schaeffer's works, beginning IVP's reputation as a publisher of note. In 1965, IVP launched the IVP Book Club and the bookstore Rack program in 1971, solidifying a sales base; these programs continue to be important parts of the publishing program.

In 1984 Linda Doll moved from the editorship of HIS Magazine to the directorship of IVP. The next year LifeGuide Bible Studies were launched; they have now sold over 15 million copies. When Linda Doll decided to return to editing in 1990, Ken DeRuiter was appointed executive director.

In that same year, the award-winning Dictionary of Christianity in America was released. While IVP had published several reference books created in Great Britain, Dictionary of Christianity in America was the first reference book published by IVP originating in the United States. In 1994 IVP published their first Bible, The NIV Quiet Time Bible.

=== Recent years and present day ===
In 1979, IVP built a warehouse and distribution center in Westmont, Illinois. IVP relocated to new offices constructed adjacent to the distribution center in 1995. Two years later, following Ken DeRuiter's retirement, Bob Fryling joined IVP as its new director. Heart. Soul. Mind. Strength. by IVP editors Andy Le Peau and Linda Doll was written in 2006 as an anecdotal history of the publishing company, summarizing leading authors and books that shaped evangelicalism in the 20th century. In 2016, after years of leadership as sales and marketing director, Jeff Crosby was named IVP publisher. Terumi Echols was named the president and publisher of IVP in September 2021. In 2023, IVP's offices moved from Westmont to Lisle, Illinois.

== Works published by Imprint ==
=== IVP ===
- Knowing God, J.I. Packer (1973)
- First Nations Version, Terry M. Wildman (2021)

== Selected bibliography ==
- Heart. Soul. Mind. Strength. An Anecdotal History of InterVarsity Press, 1947-2007 by Andrew T. Le Peau and Linda Doll, InterVarsity Press, 2006, ISBN 0-8308-3369-2.
- For Christ and the University: The Story of InterVarsity Christian Fellowship of the U.S.A./ 1940-1990 by Keith & Gladys Hunt, InterVarsity Press, 1991, ISBN 0-8308-4996-3.

== See also ==
- Ancient Christian Commentary on Scripture
