= New Catholic Bible =

English translation of the Bible

- Full name: New Catholic Bible
- Other names: St. Joseph New Catholic Bible, New Catholic Version
- Abbreviation: NCB
- Language: Modern English
- NT published: 2015
- Complete Bible published: 2019
- Translation type: Formal equivalence, limited rephrase for readability
- Publisher: Catholic Book Publishing Corp.
- Webpage: catholicbookpublishing.com
- Genesis 1:1–3 In the beginning God created the heavens and the earth. The earth was formless and barren, and darkness covered the abyss while the Spirit of God hovered over the waters. God said, “Let there be light!” And there was light. John 3:16 For God so loved the world that he gave his only Son, so that everyone who believes in him may not perish but may attain eternal life.

The New Catholic Bible (NCB) is an English translation of the Bible, produced for the Catholic Book Publishing Corp. by a team of Scripture scholars under the direction of Rev. Jude Winkler, O.F.M. Conv., S.S.L.. It is the first original Bible translation commissioned by the publisher long known for its St. Joseph Edition of Catholic Bibles, wherefore it may also be known as the St. Joseph New Catholic Bible. Before the full Bible was completed in 2019, editions of the Book of Psalms (2002) and the New Testament (2015) were published separately under the translation's former name, New Catholic Version (NCV).

Containing the full 73-book Biblical canon recognized by the Catholic Church, including 7 deuterocanonical books, the New Catholic Bible was approved for publication bearing an imprimatur and nihil obstat from the Catholic Bishops' Conference of the Philippines, making the NCB acceptable for private use by Catholics. The translation is primarily a literal formal equivalence rendering of the original Biblical Hebrew and Greek; compared to other modern Catholic versions—particularly the New American Bible Revised Edition (NABRE)—the NCB translators sought to maintain a more lyrical, flowing style ideal for personal devotional reading and study.
