= New English Translation =

English Bible translation

- Abbreviation: NET
- Complete Bible published: 2001
- Textual basis: OT: Biblia Hebraica Stuttgartensia; NT: Novum Testamentum Graece (27th ed., 1993); UBS Greek New Testament (4th corrected ed.)
- Translation type: Dynamic equivalence, with notes featuring formal equivalence
- Reading level: Middle school
- Version revision: 2003, 2005, 2017, 2019
- Publisher: Biblical Studies Press, L.L.C.
- Copyright: The NET Bible®, New English Translation Copyright © 1996 by Biblical Studies Press, L.L.C. NET Bible® Is A Registered Trademark
- Website: netbible.com
- Genesis 1:1–3 In the beginning God created the heavens and the earth. Now the earth was without shape and empty, and darkness was over the surface of the watery deep, but the Spirit of God was moving over the surface of the water. God said, "Let there be light." And there was light! John 3:16 For this is the way God loved the world: He gave his one and only Son, so that everyone who believes in him will not perish but have eternal life.

The New English Translation (NET) is a free, "completely new" English translation of the Bible, "with 60,932 translators' notes" sponsored by the Biblical Studies Foundation and published by Biblical Studies Press.

== History and textual basis ==
The New English Translation, like the New International Version, is a completely new translation of the Bible, not an update or revision of an older one (such as the English Standard Version of 2001, which is a revision of the Revised Standard Version of 1946/71, itself a revision of the American Standard Version of 1901).

The translation and extensive notes were undertaken by more than twenty biblical scholars who worked directly from the best currently available Hebrew, Aramaic, and Greek texts. The NET Bible was initially conceived at an annual meeting of the Society of Biblical Literature in November 1995 in Philadelphia, Pennsylvania. The translation project originally started as an attempt to provide a digital version of a modern English translation over the Internet and on CD-ROM without cost for the user. Many of those involved in the project's initial discussions eventually became part of the translation team. The translation itself claims to be non-sectarian, "inter-denominational" and evangelical.

The translation is most notable for an immense number of lengthy footnotes (which often explain its textual translation decision). Other significant features include its open translation process, its availability on the Internet (both during its beta process and in its final form), and its open copyright permitting free downloads.

An original beta was released in 2001, followed by a second beta in 2003 and the first edition in 2006. A second edition with updated Strong's Hebrew and Greek to English mappings was released in 2017.

As of 2019, editions with apocrypha are in development.

== Copyright status ==
The NET Bible's approach towards copyright comprises a full copyright license which is explained in its "Ministry First" statement, both of which emphasize its openness and free availability. The publishers claim that "after 10 years, the NET Bible is still the only major modern translation that can be downloaded free in its entirety and used seamlessly in presentations and documents." However, as of October 2010, the NET Bible's copyright statement is over 1500 words long, and contains different conditions for generic copyright, diglots and bible quotations in multiple formats, including commercial and non-commercial publications.

The NET Bible's approach to copyright is self-summarised as:

The Bible is God's gift to humanity – it should be free.

In "Copyright Innovations – Toward a New Model", the Ministry First position statement makes at least four additional important clarifications:

- We still don't fully like the copyright notice for the NET Bible, but in our litigious world it remains a challenge...
- We believe that 1 Tim 5:17-18 (the author has the right to be paid) and Lev 23:22 (allow the poor and foreigner free access) can be simultaneously satisfied far better with a new Internet model...
- We want all authors to know that the NET Bible is a safe choice.
- It is time for ministry to be more free – and for a Bible which puts ministry first....Let us know how we can better serve your needs.

However, these statements do not form part of the copyright notice itself, so their legal value is unclear.

== Functional and formal translation ==
Gordon Fee and Mark L. Strauss see the NET (along with the NIV and the HCSB) as a "mediating version" between functional equivalence and formal equivalence.

In the preface to the first edition, W. Hall Harris III, PhD, "The NET Bible Project Director" claims that the NET Bible solves the problem of dynamic vs. formal equivalence:

[T]he translators and editors used the notes to give a translation that was formally equivalent, while placing a somewhat more functionally [or dynamically] equivalent translation in the text itself to promote better readability and understandability. The longstanding tension between these two different approaches to Bible translation has thus been fundamentally solved.

The preface of the NET Bible presents the advantage of this feature in the following way: "The translators' notes make the original languages far more accessible, allowing you to look over the translator's shoulder at the very process of translation."

== Other versions ==
The NET Bible has both English and Chinese versions. The Chinese version is also called Chinese NET Bible.
