= The Common Edition: New Testament =

1999 translation of the New Testament

- Full name: The Common Edition: New Testament
- Abbreviation: TCE
- Textual basis: Medium Correspondence to Nestle-Aland 27th edition Novum Testamentum Graece.
- Translation type: Formal equivalence.
- Reading level: Middle School
- Publisher: PFPA
- Copyright: Copyrighted
- John 3:16 For God so loved the world that he gave his only Son, that whoever believes in him should not perish but have eternal life.

The Common Edition: New Testament is an edition of the New Testament published in 1999; it is standardized edition made to reflect the common word and punctuation choices of translations most frequently used in English speaking churches.

As stated in its introduction, the purpose is a text that can be publicly read before audiences who follow in multiple translations. As part of the design, the edition is iambic in rhythm, on a sixth grade reading level, and with a formal equivalence level comparable to the English Standard Version 2001. Since the text gives the standard English reading, the Greek textual foundations are not identical to the United Bible Societies’ 4th edition Greek New Testament, but are closer to the textual basis of the New International Version 1978, and the Revised Standard Version 1971. The Common Edition was edited by T.E. Clontz.
