= First Nations Version =

English translation of the Bible

- Full name: First Nations Version: An Indigenous Translation of the First Testament
- Language: First Nations English
- OT published: August 5, 2025 (Psalms & Proverbs)
- NT published: August 31, 2021
- Translation type: Dynamic equivalence
- Publisher: InterVarsity Press
- Website: www.firstnationsversion.com
- John 3:16 “The Great Spirit loves this world of human beings so deeply he gave us his Son—the only Son who fully represents him. All who trust in him and his way will not come to a bad end, but will have the life of the world to come that never fades away, full of beauty and harmony."

First Nations Version: An Indigenous Translation of the New Testament is a translation of the New Testament in First Nations English.

== History ==
=== Development history ===
The development of the First Nations Version was spearheaded by Terry Wildman, who worked with a core group of twelve translators representing different Native American tribes to create the translation. Wildman, who has Ojibwe and Yaqui heritage, was inspired to create the translation while working on the Hopi Reservation when he realized that few people could read the Hopi language translation of the Bible. Wildman stated in a 2023 lecture at Furman University that he "noticed that the English Bible we were reading wasn't connecting well" which he blamed on historical trauma from European assimilation attempts. Initially, Wildman created short recordings of Bible verses over Indigenous music before receiving an offer from OneBook Canada to fund a complete translation. The core group of translators was assisted by freelance reviewers and consultants, with one draft version of the book being sent to 1,300 scholars for review. The translation follows the principle of dynamic equivalence rather than formal equivalence in order to mimic the oral tradition of many Native American tribes. To that end, names in the book were translated into a structure that matches traditional Native American naming schemes—for example, the names of Mary and David were translated as "Bitter Tears" and "Much Loved One" respectively.

In July 2022, InterVarsity Press announced that they would be publishing a translation of the books of Psalms and Proverbs, with development led again by the First Nations Version Translation Council.

=== Publication history ===
The translation of the New Testament was published by InterVarsity Press on August 31, 2021. The First Nations Version: Psalms and Proverbs was published by InterVarsity Press on August 5, 2025.

== Reception ==
The First Nations Version was received positively in the popular press, although it did not receive significant academic attention. Publishers Weekly praised the translation in a starred review, writing that the translation gave the Bible "new life and new meaning" while maintaining a consistently evangelical tone throughout. The Christian Century described the translation as representing a step towards reconciliation between traditional Native American religions and Christian beliefs while offering mild criticism towards the substantial renaming the translators engaged in. Grist praised the book on similar grounds, noting that the Bible had historically been interpreted to justify environmental exploitation and that the First Nations Version consistently emphasized the co-existence of humans and nature.

The translation was named Reference Book of the Year by the Academy of Parish Clergy.
