= Moffatt, New Translation =

1922 translation of the Bible

Moffatt New Translation
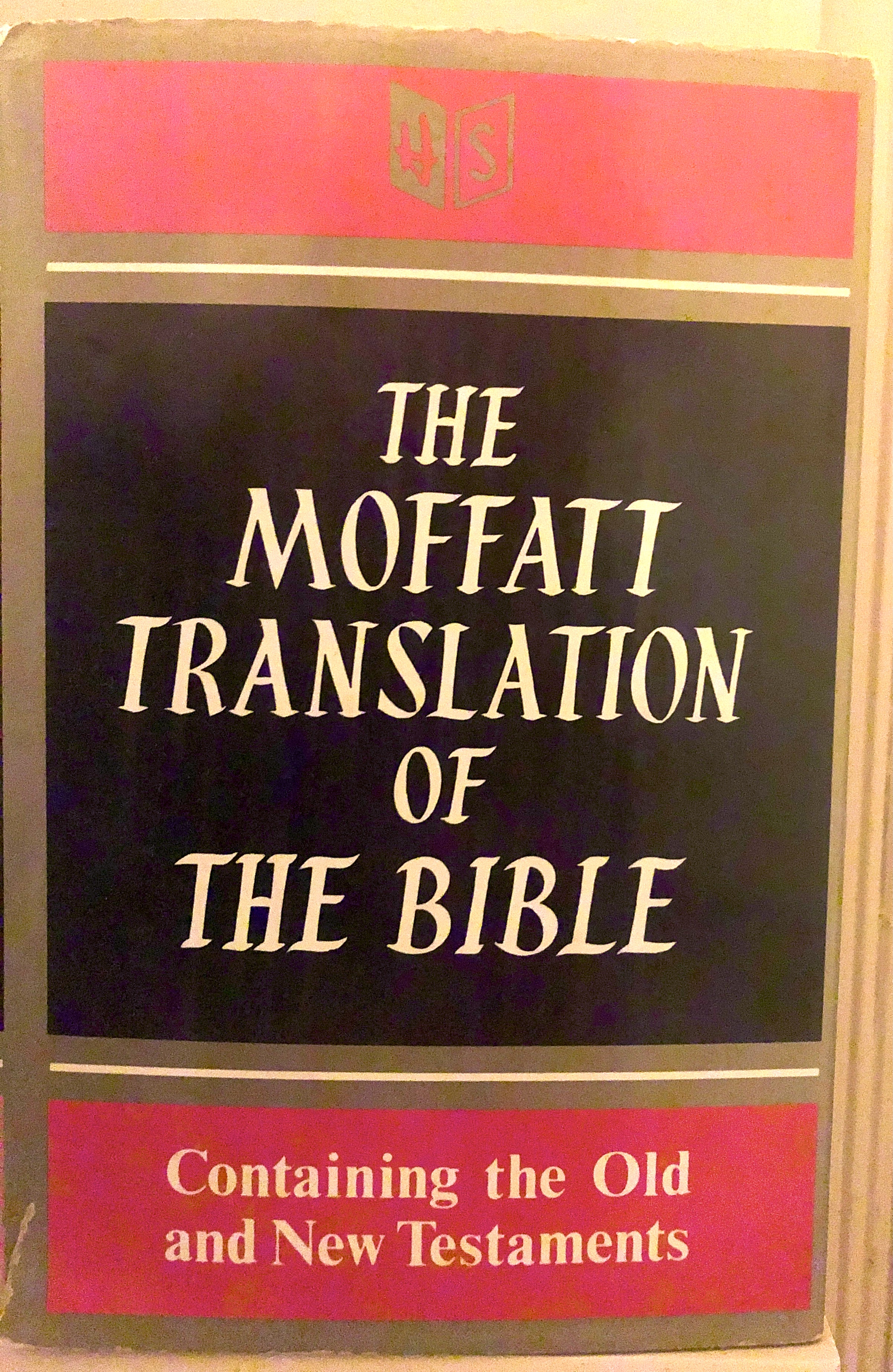
- Full name: The Holy Bible Containing the Old and New Testaments, a New Translation
- Abbreviation: MNT
- Language: English
- Complete Bible published: 1922
- Authorship: James Moffatt
- Publisher: The University of Chicago Press
- Genesis 1:1–3 When God began to form the universe, the world was void and vacant, darkness lay over the abyss; but the Spirit of God was hovering over the waters, and God said, "Let there be light," and there was light. John 3:16 For God loved the world so dearly that he gave up his only Son, so that everyone who believes in him may have eternal life, instead of perishing.

Moffatt, New Translation (MNT) is an abbreviation of the title The Holy Bible Containing the Old and New Testaments, a New Translation by James Moffatt.

== Description ==
In the introduction to his 1926 edition, Moffatt wrote, "The aim I have endeavoured to keep before my mind in making this translation has been to present the books of the Old and the New Testament in effective, intelligible English. No translation of an ancient classic can be quite intelligible, it is true, unless the reader is sufficiently acquainted with its environment to understand some of its flying allusions and characteristic metaphors. But something may be done and I am convinced, ought to be done at the present day to offer the unlearned a transcript of the Biblical literature as it lies in the light thrown upon it by modern research. The Bible is not always what it seems to those who read it in the great prose of the English version or indeed, in any of the conventional versions. What it is may be partly suggested by a new rendering, such as the following pages present, that is, a fresh translation of the original, not a revision of any English version."

In beginning his work in 1901, he arranged the New Testament into what he perceived to be historical order and provided an original translation of the New Testament, The Historical New Testament. Being the Literature of the New Testament Arranged in the Order of Its Literary Growth and According to the Dates of the Documents.

Moffatt's departed from traditional translations in several areas. Firstly, he held to the documentary hypothesis and printed his Bible in different typefaces according to which author he believed had written each particular section. Secondly, he dated most books hundreds of years later than most theologians did at the time, which stemmed from his doubt about the historical accuracy of many of the biblical books (especially in the Old Testament). Finally, he rearranged the biblical texts (usually by switching chapter orders), based on his judgments about the content, authorship, and historicity of the texts. For example, John 14 comes after John 15 and 16 in the Moffatt Bible.

He raised objections from many scholars, but proved very popular and started a trend toward more paraphrased translations. His translation was used as a benchmark for accuracy by C. S. Lewis during his research for 'Reflections on the Psalms' (1958), and was utilized by Martin Luther King Jr. for quotations from Philippians in 'Strength to Love' (1963).

== Bibles ==
- The New Testament a New Translation, 1913
- The Old Testament A New Translation, Vol. I, Genesis-Esther 1924
- The Old Testament A New Translation Vol. II, Job-Malachi 1925
- The Holy Bible Containing the Old and New Testaments, 1926
- A New Translation of The Bible Containing the Old and New Testaments, revised, 1935
- Shorter version, 1941
- Commentary (17 volumes), 1928-1949
- Concordance, 1949
- 2 Maccabees, included in Volume 1-Apocrypha of The Apocrypha and Pseudepigrapha of the Old Testament in English edited by R. H. Charles 1913.

== See also ==
- List of English Bible translations
