= James Moffatt =

British theologian

James Moffat
- James Moffatt by Olive Edis (circa 1910s)
- Born: July 4, 1870; Glasgow, Scotland
- Died: June 27, 1944 (aged 73); New York City, United States
- Education: University of Glasgow

James Moffatt (4 July 1870, Glasgow – 27 June 1944, New York City) was a Scottish theologian, author and Bible translator.

He was a graduate of the University of Glasgow. He trained at the Free Church College, Glasgow.

== Career ==
He was a practising minister at the United Free Church in Dundonald, Ayrshire, in the early years of his career. He received the degree Doctor of Divinity from the University of St Andrews in April 1902.

In 1907 he became minister of the Broughty Ferry United Free Church in Dundee; the new denomination had been created in 1900 when the majority of Free Church congregations merged with the United Presbyterian Church.

In 1911, he was appointed Professor of Greek and New Testament Exegesis at Mansfield College, Oxford. He returned to Glasgow in 1915 as Professor of Church History at the United Free Church College.

In 1927 he moved to the USA, and for the next 12 years he was Washburn Professor of Church History at the Union Theological Seminary, New York. In addition, he translated a Modern English Bible translation, the Moffatt, New Translation (MNT).

He died on 27 June, 1944 in New York aged 73.

== Translation of Bible ==
His New Translation of the New Testament was first published in 1913.

His New Translation of the Old Testament, in two volumes, was first published in 1924.

The Complete Moffatt Bible in one volume was first published in 1926. It was completely revised and reset in 1935. A Shorter Version of the Moffatt Translation of the Bible was first published in 1941.

The Moffatt New Testament Commentary, based on his translation, has 17 volumes. The first volume was published in 1928, the final volume in 1949. The concordance of the complete Bible was first published in 1949.

== Works ==
- The Historical New Testament: Being the Literature of the New Testament Arranged in the Order of its Literary Growth and According to the Dates of the Documents, 1901
- The Golden Book of John Owen: Passages from the Writings of the Rev. John Owen, 1904
- Literary Illustrations of the Bible: The Book of Ecclesiastes, 1905
- Literary Illustrations of the Bible: The Gospel of Saint Mark, 1905
- Literary Illustrations of the Bible: The Epistle to the Romans, 1905
- Literary Illustrations of the Bible: The Book of Revelation, 1905
- Literary Illustrations of the Bible: The Gospel of Saint Luke, 1906
- Literary Illustrations of the Bible: The Books of Judges and Ruth, 1906
- The Literal Interpretation of the Sermon on the Mount, (with Marcus Dods and James Denney) 1904 (Re-published 2016, CrossReach Publications)
- The Mission and Expansion of Christianity in the First Three Centuries, v. 1–3 by Adolf Harnack. Translated by James Moffatt (1908)
- Paul and Jesus, 1908
- George Meredith: Introduction to His Novels, 1909
- The Life of John Owen, 1910?
- Paul and Paulinism, 1910
- The Second Things of Life, 1910
- The Expositor’s Dictionary of Texts, vol. 1: Genesis to the Gospel of St. Mark, 1910
- The Expositor’s Dictionary of Texts, vol. 2: The Gospel of St. Luke to Revelation, 1911
- Reasons and reasons, 1911
- An Introduction to the Literature of the New Testament, 1911
- The Theology of the Gospels, 1912
- The Expositor's Dictionary of Poetical Quotations, 1913
- The Moffatt Translation of the New Testament, 1913
- A Book of Biblical Devotions for Members of the Scottish Church, 1919
- The Approach to the New Testament, 1921
- The Spiritual Pilgrimage of Jesus, (with James Alex Robertson) 1921
- Jesus on Love to God, Jesus on Love to Man, 1922
- The Moffatt Translation of the Old Testament, 1924
- The Bible in Scots Literature, 1924
- The Tree of Healing. Short Studies in the Message of the Cross, (With a biographical sketch by James Moffatt) 1925
- The Presbyterian Churches, 1928
- Love in the New Testament, 1929
- The Moffatt New Testament Commentary on the Bible V.1, 1929
- The Day Before Yesterday, 1930
- Grace in the New Testament, 1932
- He and She: A Book of Them, 1933
- His Gifts & Promises: Being Twenty-Five Reflections and Directions on Phases of our Christian Discipline, From the Inside, 1934
- Handbook to the Church Hymnary, with Supplement, (with Millar Patrick) 1935
- The Ideas Behind the Moffatt Bible: Compiled from the Introduction to the Moffatt Bible, 1935
- The Second Book of He and She: Another Book of Them, 1935
- An Approach to Ignatius, 1936
- The First Five Centuries of the Church, 1938
- Jesus Christ the Same; The Shaffer Lectures for 1940 in the Divinity School of Yale University, 1940
- The Thrill of Tradition, 1944
- Concordance of The Moffatt Translation of the Bible, 1949

== Legacy ==
He was awarded honorary degrees of Doctor of Divinity by both the University of Oxford and the University of St Andrews.

His papers are held at the University of Glasgow.
