= The Story Bible =

Book by Pearl S. Buck

- The front cover of The Story Bible
- Author: Pearl S. Buck
- Language: English
- Publisher: Bartholomew House
- Publication date: 1971 (Hardback)
- Publication place: United States
- Media type: Print (Paperback & Hardback)
- Pages: 528 pp (hardback)
- ISBN: 0-87794-025-8
- OCLC: 145798
- Dewey Decimal: 220.95/05
- LC Class: BS550.2 .B76

The Story Bible is a book by Pearl S. Buck summarizing the whole Bible in two separate volumes: Vol. 1, The Old Testament, and Vol. 2, The New Testament, while particularly emphasizing literal elements and fables. It is described as a paraphrase.

== About the Author ==
Pearl Sydenstricker was born to Caroline Stulting and Absalom Sydenstricker in Hillsboro, West Virginia, on June 26, 1892. Her career began in China where she married an agricultural economist missionary named John Loosing Buck in 1917. They moved to a small town on the Huai River called Suzhou, Anhui Province.

From 1920 to 1933 they lived in Nanjing, on the campus of the University of Nanking, where the couple held teaching positions. Pearl taught English literature at the school. The Nanking Incident led to the couple leaving the campus. In 1934 Pearl got an invitation to the United States to speak at a Presbyterian women luncheon. She left China never to return.

Her writing career consisted of winning two notable awards, the Pulitzer Prize in 1932 and in 1938, she was awarded the Nobel Prize in Literature "for her rich and truly epic descriptions of peasant life in China and for her biographical masterpieces." [1] In 1935 the couple got divorced and Pearl later remarried to Richard Walsh. Upon her return to the United States she continued her outstanding writing career, and became an advocate for women and minority group rights. In 1973 she died of lung cancer at the age of 80 and was buried Perkasie, Pennsylvania.
