= Modern Language Bible =

English Bible translation

Modern Language Bible, The
- Full name: The Modern Language Bible: The New Berkeley Version in Modern English
- Abbreviation: MLB
- Language: English
- Complete Bible published: 1969
- Copyright: Copyright by Zondervan Publishing House
- Genesis 1:1–3 In the beginning God created the heavens and the earth. The earth was formless and empty, and darkness lay upon the face of the deep, and the Spirit of God was moving over the surface of the waters. God said: Let there be light, and there was light. John 3:16 For God so loved the world that He gave His only Son, so that whoever believes in Him should not perish, but have everlasting life.

The Modern Language Bible: The New Berkeley Version in Modern English is an English Bible translation. The translation was a revision of an earlier translation by Gerrit Verkuyl.

According to the preface, "Approximately twenty-five years have passed since The Berkeley New Testament first appeared in 1945. During this quarter century, the need for its revision has become evident. As is inevitable with any Bible translation--and perhaps most of all with a one-man version--idiosyncrasies and other matters requiring correction have come to light. In response, therefore, to suggestions and criticisms, the publishers appointed three experienced Bible scholars to revise The Berkeley New Testament, namely, E. Schuyler English, Litt.D., chairman; Frank E. Gaebelein, A.M., Litt.D.; and G. Henry Waterman, A.M., Ph.D. The present edition is the result of their work."
