= Third Millennium Bible =

1998 minor update of the King James Version of the Bible

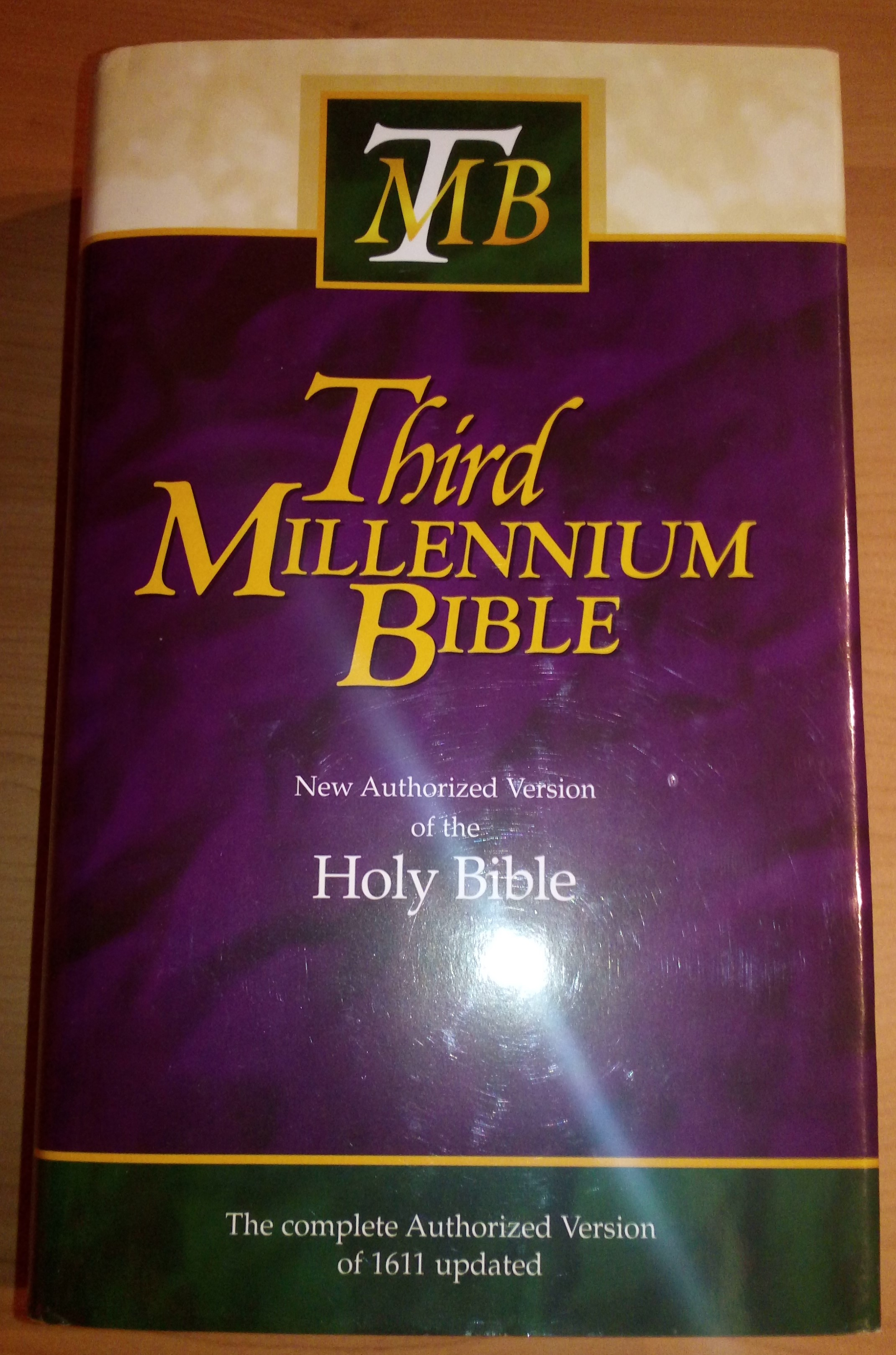
- Third Millennium Bible inside its cover
- Full name: Third Millennium Bible, New Authorized Version of the Holy Bible
- Abbreviation: TMB
- Complete Bible published: 1998
- Apocrypha: Deuterocanonical books
- Copyright: Copyright 1998 by Deuel Enterprises, Inc., Gary, SD 57237. All rights reserved.
- Genesis 1:1–3 In the beginning God created the heaven and the earth. And the earth was without form and void, and darkness was upon the face of the deep. And the Spirit of God moved upon the face of the waters. And God said, "Let there be light"; and there was light. John 3:16 For God so loved the world that He gave His only begotten Son, that whosoever believeth in Him should not perish, but have everlasting life.

The Third Millennium Bible (TMB), also known as the New Authorized Version, is a 1998 minor update of the King James Version of the Bible. Unlike the New King James Version, it does not alter the language significantly from the 1611 version, retaining Jacobean grammar (including "thees" and "thous"), but it does attempt to replace some of the vocabulary which no longer would make sense to a modern reader.

== Characteristics ==
=== Canon ===
The TMB, like the original KJV in 1611, contains the Apocryphal/Deuterocanonical books of the Old Testament in between the Old and New Testaments, making a total of 80 books. This has helped win it some support among traditionalist Anglicans and Eastern Orthodox Christians.

A version without the Apocrypha (and with formatting changes) is known as the 21st Century King James Version.

=== Word updating ===
Vocabulary updates were based on Webster's New International Dictionary, Second Edition, Unabridged.

An example of word updating from Ezra 9:3:

King James Version	...and sat down astonied.
Third Millennium Bible	....and sat down stunned.
