= Life of Soul =

Life of Soul (Lyfe of Soule) is a short anonymous prose tract written in the late Middle English of the English Midlands about 1400 or a little earlier.

== Form ==
The tract takes the form of a catechetical dialogue, or at least begins that way, one interlocutor falling silent about halfway through; of the three surviving versions, version L represents itself as a conversation between two "friends in Christ"; versions A and H replace this pair with a questioning sister and answering brother and a questioning son and answering father respectively. Life of Soul consists of six questions together with the corresponding answers. The first five questions are introductory, the sixth provokes a lengthy reply that forms the bulk of the tract. The tract begins with the eternal question, "How does one get to heaven?"; answers, "Through Christ who is the life of our soul" --identifying that life with faith and renunciation of sin--; and proceeds to the final question that forms the structural motif for the tract: "What are the food and drink that nourish the life of soul?" The rest of the text explicates the answer: the soul's bread is faith in Christ and its drink is adherence to his words. Faith in Christ is divided into faith in his divinity and faith in his humanity, the relevant tenets of the creed being listed under each. Christ's words are explained as being summed up in the two commands of love: to love God and one's brother. These two words, it is explained, comprise all ten of the Mosaic Ten Commandments (duly listed and accounted for); they combat the seven deadly sins (each duly listed, its defeat by love explained); they inspire their adherents to perform the corporal works of mercy(duly listed); and they nourish and are nourished by six virtues: peaceableness, patience, meekness, poverty in spirit, truth, and chastity. Each virtue is then exemplified, largely from the Sermon on the Mount; meekness by, among other things, the Lord's Prayer as the exemplarily prayer of the meek, a device which allows the author to expound the Lord's Prayer.

== Audience ==
Version L of Life of Soul (the version that forms the basis for available modern editions) appears to have been addressed to a lay audience, version A perhaps adapted for "religious" (i.e., those who, like monks, live under a rule). Two features of the tract would suit it for a monastic audience: the constant use of the words "brother" and "brethren" to describe fellow Christians; and the subject matter of the work: Christian perfection, especially as that is laid out in the so-called "Evangelical counsels" or "counsels of perfection" found in Christ's Sermon on the Mount (Matthew 5-6). According to a considerable tradition, these "counsels," too demanding to be imposed on the ordinary believer, are the preserve of those with a calling to the monastic life. But the counsels to perfection were embraced by many individuals and movements that were not monastic; and there is nothing specifically monastic about their interpretation here: the work inculcates faith, good works, and the avoidance of such universal faults as anger, pride, and malicious gossip. Even poverty and chastity are recommended in universal terms. The tract also mentions Christ's strictures against divorce, hardly relevant to monks. It is noteworthy that version A, perhaps adapted for a monastic audience, adds to this section the comment, "In order to set us an example of chastity, Christ chose for his lifespan this manner of life [i.e., celibacy], as did many of his apostles." The social class of the audience is similarly difficult to specify. The author addresses remarks to both the poor, who are warned that material poverty in itself is valueless, and the rich, who are warned that wealth used selfishly damns the possessor. These warnings could well be directed toward contemporary society (e.g., toward friars and prelates respectively), rather than toward actual members of the anticipated readership.

== Contents ==
=== Traditional features ===
Most of the materials of which Life of Soul is composed associate it with the large and diffuse category of catechetical manuals, basic manuals of religious instruction, in which annotated lists of virtues, commandments, works of mercy, etc., are a staple. Seven such enumerations formed the basis of Archbishop Peckham's plans in the previous century to educate the English laity and secular clergy. According to the canons of the Council of Lambeth (1281), every parish priest was to explain these seven to his parishioners four times a year. In 1357, Archbishop John Thoresby issued a similar set of instructions to the clergy of the Province of York, commissioning this time a vernacular version (the so-called "Lay-Folks' Catechism") which became the religious best seller of the fourteenth and fifteenth centuries. A similar set of lists was popularized through the extremely influential contemplative manual by Edmund of Abingdon, the so-called "St. Edmund's Mirror," widely distributed in Latin, French, and English versions. The Mirror contains chapters, for example, on the seven deadly sins, the seven evangelical virtues (based, like the virtues in our text, on the Beatitudes of the Sermon on the Mount), the twelve articles of the creed, the seven works of mercy, directions on the contemplation of God in his humanity and in his divinity, the seven petitions of the Lord's Prayer, and the ten commandments, of which "the first three pertain to the love of God, the latter seven to the love of one's brother." Life of Soul falls somewhere within the vast tradition of devotional manuals which flows from these influential headwaters. According to the taxonomy of the manual tradition proposed by C.A.Martin, Life of Soul is of type 5: instructional manuals that combine the catechetical enumerations with moral and devotional material so as to provide guides to a more perfect way of life. Life of Soule resists most of the handiest labels and categories. Even the Manual of the Writings in Middle English, compelled by its comprehensive design to place every Middle English work in some category or another, has failed to find a place for the Life of Soul: it does not treat it in volume two as a Wycliffite text, or a Biblical translation, or an instruction for nuns or monks; nor in volume three as a dialogue; nor in volume seven as a work of religious or philosophical instruction, instead directing, "for The Lyfe of Soule, a dialogue on the life of Christian perfection intended for both a lay and a religious audience...see the chapter on English Mystical Writings [in volume nine]." But of course Life of Soul does not appear there either. The truth is, the tract enjoys some affinities with each of these categories, though the affinities are stronger with some than with others. The "dialogue" and "mystical" categories are probably the least apt: the dialogue form contributes little to the work and fades almost completely away by the end. And as for mysticism, at best, Life of Soul belongs among those works of religious devotion that invoke affective themes in pursuit of a basically didactic or catechetical end, such as the Mirror of Life (Speculum Vitae), the Abbey of the Holy Ghost, or even The Imitation of Christ. The only thing mystical about the Life of Soul lies in its insistence on connecting motive and behavior, on enumerating commandments and virtues not as duties to be performed or habits to be formed so much as symptoms of an underlying ardent love for God and, through God, one's neighbor, which must be cultivated by the devout Christian—a theme that looms large among the established mystical or quasi-mystical English authors, especially Richard Rolle and Walter Hilton, but far from exclusively so. Life of Soul shows no interest in contemplation or extraordinary spiritual experience, its interest being rather in normative experiences of faith and love. Nor is it interested in distinguishing the active from the contemplative life, or, indeed, in any of the various approaches to knowing God that found favor among the English mystics.

=== Distinctive features ===
Given the bulk and inaccessibility of the comparative material, it is difficult to be sure how distinctive Life of Soul is. Most unusual, perhaps, are its structure and manner of argument. The structure is based on an elaborate set of associations that link every basic aspect of Christian dogma and practice, with the notable exception of the seven sacraments (penance in particular being notable for its absence), with the inner spiritual life of love and faith. The association of the ten commandments with the two gospel precepts of love was made already by Jesus and by Paul, and is a constant feature of treatises on the commandments. But the expansion of this scheme that Life of Soul employs, managing to stretch the precepts to subsume the evangelical virtues (idiosyncratically listed), the works of mercy, the seven deadly sins, and even the Lord's Prayer, is probably unique, as is its identification of works (as expressed in the two gospel precepts) and faith (as expressed in the creed) with the "drink" and "bread" that nourish the life of soul.

The other notable feature of the tract is its extreme reliance on the Bible to carry its argument. The Bible is cited frequently, at length, and to the exclusion of all other authorities, to the extent that over half of the book consists of Biblical quotations. The translation is usually accurate and idiomatic. Although it cannot be identified with any of the extant Middle English translations, it does often bear a close resemblance to the southern prose version of ca. 1388 edited by Anna Paues. That the biblicism of Life of Soul affects not only its outright quotations but also most of its diction and metaphor will be apparent to most readers. The audience is probably expected to recognize allusions to the "wedding garment" or the "house built upon a foundation of stone."

== Parallels ==
The text edited by Anna Paues provides also one of a number of specific parallels with other tracts that may help in tracing the affiliations of Life of Soul. The Bible translation is preceded by a "Prologue" in dialogue form that contains some of the same arguments as those used by Life of Soul to ask and answer the question: is it right to share the mysteries of theology with laymen? Both questioners, for example, cite the parable of the faithful and unfaithful servants, the faithful servant being the one who did not clutch his lord's treasure to himself but put it out for trading, buying and selling: so should the theologian do with his theological treasure. Even closer parallels have been noted between the ten commandments section of Life of Soul and the corresponding section of the compendious tract called Pore Caitif. The material is very traditional, and a common source may well be involved, but some connection is demonstrable from the often verbatim correspondence.

Finally, it is hard to avoid comparison of Life of Soul with the idiosyncratic and personal treatise called Book to a Mother. Both stress the importance of personal devotion and a life of perfection, both incorporate the catechetical lists, and both are heavily Biblical in content.

== Orthodoxy ==
The emphasis on lay piety and Biblical translation together have caused some to doubt the orthodoxy of both books; indeed, Pore Caitif, Book to a Mother, and Life of Soul have all aroused suspicions of sympathies with the Lollard movement. After the 1407 prohibition by Bishop Arundel of lay ownership of the Scriptures in English, possession of either Life of Soul or Book to a Mother could have been grounds for suspicion or even prosecution. Moreover, four other features of Life of Soul raise suspicions of heterodoxy:

1. Oaths. In explicating the virtue of "truth," Life of Soul issues a blanket dismissal of oath-taking: "among true men there is no need for oaths." The host in Chaucer's Canterbury Tales was not the only one able to scent "a loller in the wynd" when oath-taking was condemned. If carried out in practice, such a prohibition would be socially disruptive, if not revolutionary, and it was so regarded when mentioned as a symptom of Lollard sympathies. The tract's statement is bare and brief, and could be taken as an abbreviated form of some more balanced position such as that taken by the Wycliffite Lantern of Light or the radically reformist but orthodox Dives and Pauper. But as stated, the position of our tract is that of the Lollards. It is worth noting, too, that "true men" was evidently the Lollards' own favorite name for themselves.
2. Peaceableness or pacifism? Peaceableness is certainly well established as an orthodox Christian virtue, but its socially disruptive extension to outright pacifism has always been treated with more suspicion. Pacifism was only intermittently part of the Lollard ideology—but it is worth noting that the section on peaceableness is the one replaced in the H and A versions of Life of Soul.
3. A memorial view of the eucharist. If the author held an orthodox Catholic view of the eucharist, he is remarkably reticent about it. Both the words of institution ("This is my body") and the more explicit words of John 6 about eating the flesh of Christ are quoted, but are consistently interpreted symbolically, or so it would seem; and the events of the last supper itself, when mentioned, are referred to as something done in order that we might remember. There is nothing explicitly heterodox, and no polemic, but like many Lollard confessions, the tract is "more significant for what it did not say than for what it did." A more or less spiritualized or memorial view of the eucharist was prevalent among the Lollards; as late as 1499 we find words in a Lollard's confession that echo our text: "Whosoever receive devoutly God's word, he receiveth the very body of Christ."
4. Dominion. Among the potentially most revolutionary of Wyclif's ideas was that "dominion"--the right to rule and own—depended on the righteousness of the ruler and owner; and a truly righteous owner would be inclined to give his wealth away. "Lords of this world who do not truly serve God, steal God's goods, for the things that they possess they have without his leave--and then they are thieves." Lollardy derived from this theory a political program of disendowment for the clergy and a personal ideal of simple poverty divested of all wealth beyond that needed for survival. The interpretation of "poor in spirit" given by Life of Soul appears to be in harmony with those views: "Someone who holds onto God's goods in his keeping in order to spend them on his own desire, where there is no need, it is certain that he holds these goods against God's will, and then he is a thief that robs God of his goods."

None of these points is conclusive, but together they strongly suggest an author at least sympathetic to Wycliffite views.

== Versions and manuscript context ==
The three versions of Life of Soul appear each in a single manuscript: version L in the Bodleian Library (Oxford) manuscript Laud Misc. 210, folios 114r-132v; version A in the British Library (London) manuscript Arundel 286, folios 115r-129r; and version H in the Huntington Library (California) manuscript HM 502, folios 35r-60v. Version L is the most complete; version H has some material not in L, which may be original, or may represent expansions; and version A is a severely abridged version. The manuscripts in which all three appear are all orthodox compilations of devotional material, in L and H often material of lay interest. "L," for example, includes Book to a Mother, Rolle's Form of Living, the Sixteen Points of Charity, and The Abbey of the Holy Ghost, another tract that (as Gillespie says) "is intended for people seeking a 'relygyon of the herte'"; "H," Rolle again and St. Edmund's Mirror; and "A," the manuscript likely intended for a monastic audience, a commendation of virginity, several pseudo-Rolle works largely Anselmian or Victorine in origin, a tract on the ten commandments, and a set of contemplations on the liturgical hours. Aside from the differences of personnel and audience mentioned above, the three versions differ somewhat in the dialect of their English. The text's sole editor (Moon) locates versions L and H in the London area or points south, A farther north and west (and calls it perhaps a little more recent than the others). But the Linguistic Atlas of Late Mediaeval English locates the scribal practices of both A and H in Warwickshire.

Life of Soul has been edited in full only once, by Helen M. Moon (a.k.a. Sister Mary Leonella, O.S.F., née Helen M. Pimpl): The Lyfe of Soule: An Edition with Commentary, ed. Sister Mary Leonella Pimpl, O.S.F. (Ph.D. Diss. Fordham University, 1963. DAI 25.4 (Oct. 1964): 2498-99. UMI 64-2408). This thesis was published (confusingly) as The Lyfe of Soule: An Edition with Commentary, ed. Helen M. Moon, Salzburg Studies in English Literature. Elizabethan & Renaissance Studies, 75 (Salzburg: Institut für englische Sprache und Literatur, Universität Salzburg, 1978).

An abridged transcript of the L version, together with a modern English translation by Paul Schaffner, appears in the anthology Cultures of Piety: Medieval English Devotional Literature in Translation, ed. Anne Clark Bartlett and Thomas H. Bestul (Ithaca, NY: Cornell University Press, 1999) pp. 118–140 (translation) and 217-231 (ME text). A full version of the same transcription (Middle English text only) is available online in the University of Michigan's Corpus of Middle English Prose and Verse.
