= New Life Version =

English Bible translation

The New Life Version (NLV) of the Bible is a simplified English translation by Gleason and Kathryn Ledyard.

== History ==
The translation was born out of the Ledyards' missionary work in the Canadian Arctic to First Nations populations, who did not always speak English fluently. The NLV uses a limited vocabulary of about 850 words, not including proper names. This was done to make the text easier to read and understand, a goal that the Ledyards felt was not adequately met by existing English translations of the Bible.

The NLV uses gender-specific language and uses no contractions. Confusing wording is avoided. Weights and measures are worded so that anyone can understand them; For example, Noah's ark is described as being: "...as long as 150 long steps, as wide as twenty-five long steps, and eight times taller than a man."

The translation of the New Testament was completed in 1969, and the complete NLV Bible with Old and New Testaments was first published in 1986.

The NLV Bible is published by Christian Literature International. It can be accessed online.

== Examples for comparison ==
King James Version of John 3:16-17 : "For God so loved the world that he gave his only begotten Son that whosoever believeth in him should not perish but have everlasting life. For God sent not his Son into the world to condemn the world; but that the world through him might be saved."

New Life Version of John 3:16-17 : "For God so loved the world that He gave His only Son. Whoever puts his trust in God's Son will not be lost but will have life that lasts forever. For God did not send His Son into the world to say it is guilty. He sent His Son so the world might be saved from the punishment of sin by Him."

King James Version of Genesis 1:1-3 : "In the beginning God created the heaven and the earth. And the earth was without form, and void; and darkness was upon the face of the deep. And the Spirit of God moved upon the face of the waters. And God said, Let there be light: and there was light."

New Life Version of Genesis 1:1-3 : "In the beginning God made from nothing the heavens and the earth. The earth was an empty waste and darkness was over the deep waters. And the Spirit of God was moving over the top of the waters. Then God said, “Let there be light,” and there was light."
