= New Century Version =

English translation of the Christian Bible

- Full name: New Century Version
- Other names: The Youth Bible; The Everyday Bible
- Abbreviation: NCV
- Complete Bible published: 1987
- Textual basis: NT: United Bible Societies' Greek text, third edition. OT: Biblia Hebraica Stuttgartensia, with Septuagint influence.
- Translation type: Free translation
- Reading level: Fifth grade
- Publisher: Thomas Nelson
- Genesis 1:1–3 In the beginning God created the sky and the earth. The earth was empty and had no form. Darkness covered the ocean, and God's Spirit was moving over the water. Then God said, "Let there be light," and there was light. John 3:16 God loved the world so much that he gave his one and only Son so that whoever believes in him may not be lost, but have eternal life.

The New Century Version (NCV) is a revision of the International Children's Bible (ICB).

The ICB is a translation of the Bible that was aimed at young readers and those with low reading skills/limited vocabulary in English. It is written at a 3rd grade level (from the introduction) and is both conservative and evangelical in tone. The New Testament was first published in 1983 and the Old Testament followed in 1987.

The ICB was revised to a more sophisticated 5th grade reading level and was dubbed the New Century Version. A gender-neutral edition was first published in 1991, supplanting the original.

Grudem and Poythress wrote, "The earliest complete translations of the Bible to adopt a gender-neutral translation policy were apparently the New Century Version (NCV) and the International Children’s Bible (ICB), both published by Worthy Publishing Company, which was sold to Word Publishing in 1988. The simplified ICB says nothing in its preface about its gender-neutral translation policy. But the NCV gives some explanation. The goal of the NCV was to make a Bible that was clear and easily understood, and the translators based their vocabulary choice on a list of words used by the editors of The World Book Encyclopedia to determine appropriate vocabulary ('Preface,' p. xiii). Based on the concern for clarity and simplicity of expression. With regard to gender language, the NCV is strongly gender-neutral."

The New Century Version text was paired with notes containing advice on teenage issues to form "The Youth Bible," and was updated in 2007. The NCV has been available as a stand-alone version since 1991. Also available as a New Testament, Psalms and Proverbs version known as "Clean: A Recovery Companion". This edition is published by Thomas Nelson, an imprint of Harper-Collins Christian Publishing group.

The base text of the Expanded Bible (EXB) is a modified version of the New Century Version.
