= Epistles to the Corinthians =

There are two Epistles to the Corinthians in the New Testament:

- First Epistle to the Corinthians
- Second Epistle to the Corinthians

There is also a Third Epistle to the Corinthians, once considered canonical by the Armenian Apostolic Church, but now almost universally believed to be pseudepigraphical.
