= Genesis 1:1 =

First verse of the first chapter of the Book of Genesis

- 1:2 →
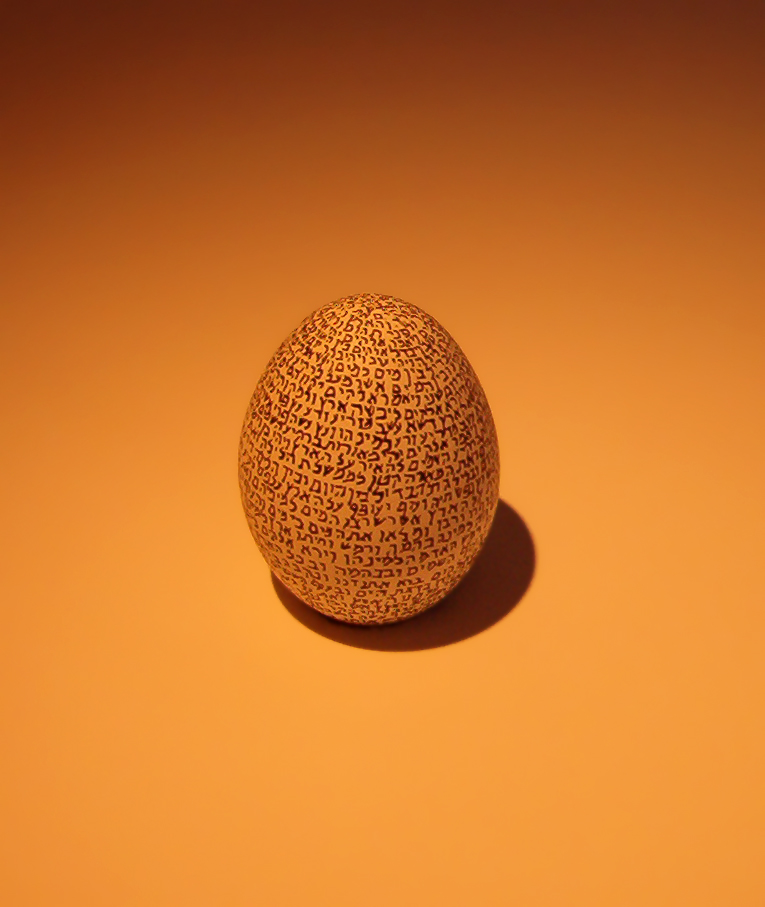
- The first chapter of Genesis (B'reshit in Hebrew) written on an egg in the Israel Museum
- Book: Book of Genesis
- Hebrew Bible part: Torah
- Order in the Hebrew part: 1
- Christian Bible part: Old Testament
- Order in the Christian part: 1

Genesis 1:1–5
Genesis 1 verses 1–5 sung in Hebrew as a cantillation

Genesis 1:1 is the first verse of the first chapter of the Book of Genesis in the Hebrew and Christian Bibles and the opening of the Genesis creation narrative.

== Text ==
The Hebrew is as follows:

- Vocalized: בְּרֵאשִׁית בָּרָא אֱלֹהִים אֵת הַשָּׁמַיִם וְאֵת הָאָרֶץ
- Transliterated: Bereshit bara Elohim et hashamayim ve'et ha'aretz.
1. Bereshit (בְּרֵאשִׁית): "In the beginning of [something]". Be is a prepositional prefix, resh is a noun, meaning 'head'. As a result, this forms part of a genitive phrase, leading to a linguistic and exegetical translation of this word being 'In the beginning of...'.
2. bara (בָּרָא): '[he] created/creating'. The word is in the masculine singular form, so that 'he' is implied; this verb is used only for the God of Israel. It concerns the bringing into existence of a functionality, through organisation and the assignment of roles and function, but not the creation ex-nihilo of new material.
3. Elohim (אֱלֹהִים): the generic word for God, whether the God of Israel or the gods of other nations; it is used throughout Genesis 1, and contrasts with the phrase YHWH Elohim, "God YHWH", introduced in Genesis 2.
4. et (אֵת): a particle used in front of the direct object of a verb, in this case "the heavens" and "the earth", indicating that these are what is being "created".
5. Hashamayim ve'et ha'aretz (הַשָּׁמַיִם וְאֵת הָאָרֶץ): "the heavens and the earth"; this is a merism, a figure of speech indicating the two stand not for "heaven" and "earth" individually but "everything"; the entire cosmos.

The Greek is as follows:

- Vocalized: ΕΝ ἀρχῇ ἐποίησεν ὁ Θεὸς τὸν οὐρανὸν καὶ τὴν γῆν.
- Transliterated: EN archí epoíisen o Theós tón ouranón kaí tín gín.

The Latin is as follows:

- Vocalized: In principio creavit Deus caelum et terram.

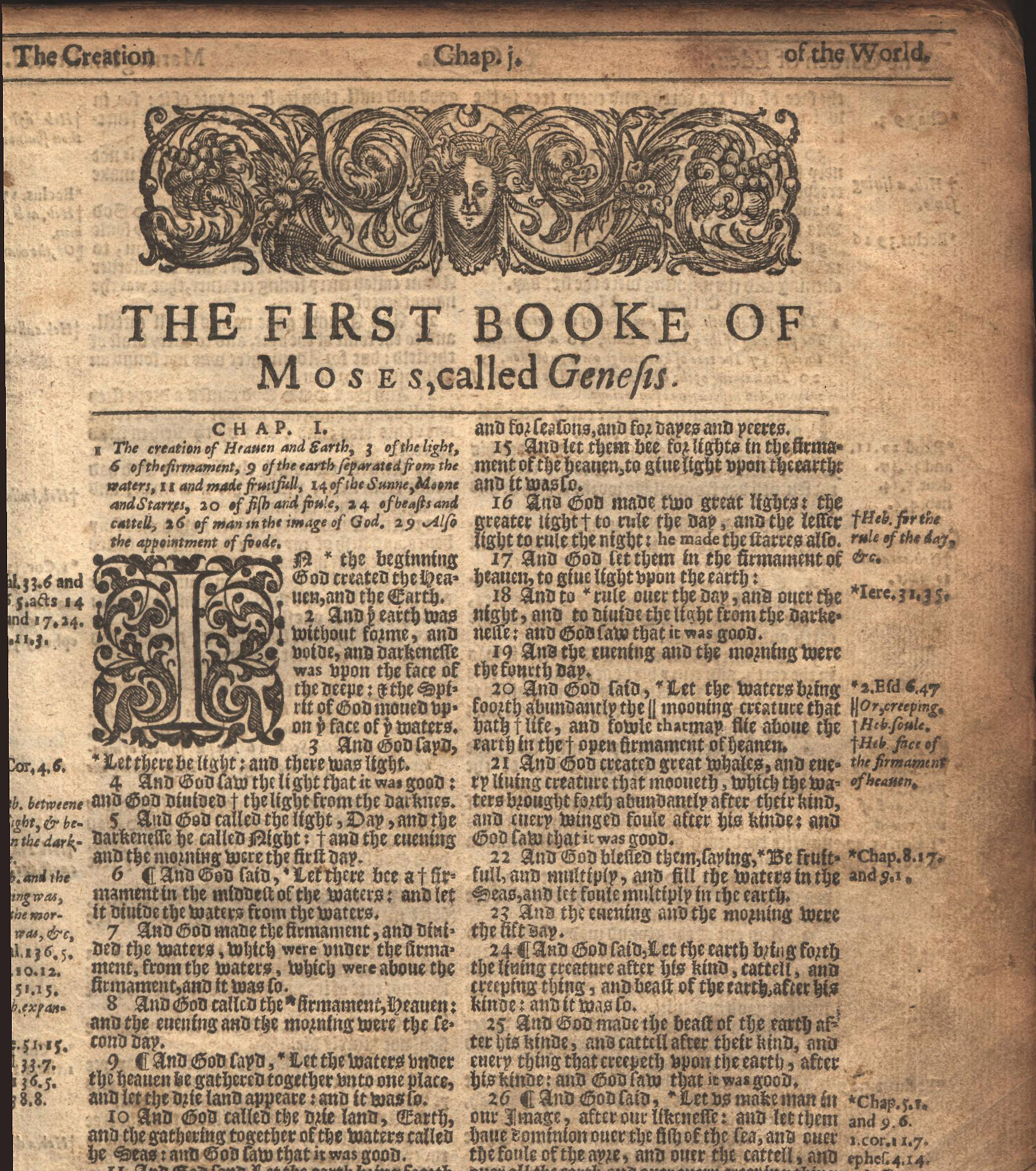
The Opening of Genesis Chapter 1 from a 1620–21 King James Bible in black letter type. The first edition of the KJV was 1611.

It can be translated into English in at least two ways:

1. As a statement that the cosmos had an absolute beginning ("In the beginning, God created the heavens and earth").
2. As a statement describing the world's condition when God began creating, taking Genesis 1:2 as background information ("When in the beginning God created the heavens and the earth, the earth was untamed and shapeless...").

== Analysis ==
Genesis 1:1 forms the basis for the Judeo-Christian doctrine of creation out of nothing (creatio ex nihilo). Some scholars still support this reading, but most agree that on strictly linguistic and exegetical grounds this is not the preferred option, and that the authors of Genesis 1 were concerned not with the origins of matter (the material which God formed into the habitable cosmos), but with the fixing of destinies.

== See also ==
- Genesis 1:2
- Parashat Bereshit
- Apollo 8 Genesis reading while in lunar orbit, December 24, 1968

Preceded by -	Book of Genesis	Succeeded by Genesis 1:2
