= Jah =

Short form for name of Abrahamic God

Jah or Yah (Hebrew: יָהּ, romanized: Yāh) is a short form of the Tetragrammaton יהוה (YHWH), the personal name of God: Yahweh, which the ancient Israelites used. The conventional Christian English pronunciation of Jah is /ˈdʒɑː/, even though the letter J here transliterates the palatal approximant (Hebrew י yodh). The spelling Yah is designed to make the pronunciation /ˈjɑː/ explicit in an English-language context (see also romanization of Hebrew), especially for Christians who may not use Hebrew regularly during prayer and study.

This short form of the name occurs 50 times in the text of the Hebrew Bible, of which 24 form part of the phrase "Hallelujah", a phrase that continues to be employed by Jews and Christians to give praise to Yahweh. In the 1611 King James Version of the Christian Bible there is a single instance of JAH (capitalized), in Psalm 68:4. An American Translation (1939) and the New King James Version (NKJV), published in 1982, follow the KJV in using Yah in this verse.

While pronouncing the Tetragrammaton is forbidden for Jews, articulating Yah (which is used more frequently in the Jewish context than Jah is) is allowed but is usually confined to prayer and study.

The name Jah is frequently employed by adherents of Rastafari to refer to God.

== Etymology ==
The name of the national god of the kingdoms of Israel (Samaria) and Judah is written in the Hebrew Bible as יהוה (YHWH), which modern scholars often render as Yahweh. The short form Jah/Yah, appears in Exodus 15:2 and 17:16, Psalm 89:9, (arguably, by emendation) Song of Songs 8:6, as well as in the phrase Hallelujah. The name of Yahweh is also incorporated into several theophoric names, however, in almost all cases the Hebrew name itself uses -yāhū, not -yāh. This does not preclude the translation of several -yāhū names without the added ū, such as Elijah (ʾĒlīyyāhū) or Hezekiah (H̱īzəqīyyāhū), or the existence of several Hebrew names which do use the -yāh form, such as Jedidjah, Malchijah, and Adonijah.

== In the Tanakh ==
Yah occurs 50 times: 43 times in the Psalms, in Exodus 15:2; 17:16; and Isaiah 12:2; 26:4, as well as twice in Isaiah 38:11.

== In the Christian New Testament ==
At Revelation 19:1–6, Jah is embedded in the phrase "hallelujah" (Tiberian halləlûyāh), a Hebrew expression that literally means "Praise Jah". The short form "IA" (Yah or Jah (יה)) in the phrase hallelouia (Ἁλληλουιά) is transcribed by the Greek ia.

== Jewish and Christian Bibles ==
In the King James Version of the Christian Bible, the Hebrew יהּ is transliterated as "JAH" (capitalised) in only one instance: "Sing unto God, sing praises to his name: extol him that rideth upon the heavens by his name JAH, and rejoice before him". An American Translation renders the Hebrew word as "Yah" in this verse. In the 1885 Revised Version and its annotated study edition, The Modern Reader's Bible, which uses the Revised Version as its base text, also transliterates "JAH" in Psalms 89:8 which reads, "O LORD God of hosts, who is a mighty one, like unto thee, O JAH? and thy faithfulness is round about thee".

With the rise of the Reformation, reconstructions of the Tetragrammaton became popular. The Tyndale Bible was the first English translation to use the anglicized reconstruction. The modern letter "J" settled on its current English pronunciation only around 500 years ago; in Ancient Hebrew, the first consonant of the Tetragrammaton always represents a "Y" sound.

Rotherham's Emphasised Bible includes 49 uses of Jah. In the Sacred Scriptures Bethel Edition Bible, the Jerusalem Bible, and the New Jerusalem Bible (prior to 1998) the name "YHWH" and its abbreviated form "Yah" is found. The New World Translation of the Holy Scriptures, used primarily by Jehovah's Witnesses, employs "Jah" in the Hebrew Scriptures, and translates Hallelujah as "Praise Jah" in the Greek Scriptures. The Divine Name King James Bible employs "JAH" in 50 instances within the Old Testament according to the Divine Name Concordance of the Divine Name King James Bible, Second Edition.

The Spanish language Reina Valera Bible employs "JAH" in 21 instances within the Old Testament according to the Nueva Concordancia Strong Exhaustiva. The Darby Bible, Young's Literal Translation, The Jubilee Bible 2000, Lexham English Bible, The Complete Jewish Bible, Names of God Bible, The Recovery Version, Green's Literal Translation, the New Jewish Publication Society or NJPS Tanakh and World English Bible includes "Jah" (Yah in the Lexham English Bible, Complete Jewish Bible, the NJPS Tanakh and the World English Bible) numerous times within the Old Testament (as well as in the New Testament or New Covenant as is the case in Christian and Messianic Jewish Bibles) as "Hallelujah!" or "Alleluia!" (Praise Jah or Yah in either instance) which is also employed throughout the Old Testament of these Bible versions.

"Hallelujah!" or "Alleluia!" is also used in other Bible versions such as the Divine Name King James Bible, American Standard Version, the Recovery Version, The Tree of Life Version, Amplified Bible, God's Word Translation, Holman Christian Standard Bible, International Standard Version, The Message, New American Bible Revised Edition, The Jerusalem Bible, The New Jerusalem Bible, NJPS Tanakh, The first JPS translation, The Living Bible, The Bible in Living English, Young's Literal Translation, King James Version, The Spanish language Reina Valera and even in Bible versions that otherwise do not generally use the Divine Name such as the New King James Version, English Standard Version, J.B. Phillips New Testament, New International Version, Douay-Rheims Version, God's Word Translation, Revised Standard Version, New Revised Standard Version, The Jubilee Bible 2000, New American Standard Bible, New Century Version, New International Reader's Version and several other versions, translations and/or editions in English and other languages varying from once to numerous times depending on the Bible version especially and most notably in Revelation Chapter 19 in Christian and Messianic Jewish Bibles.

== Rastafari usage ==
Rastafari use the name Jah as a term for the Lord God or Haile Selassie, who some Rastafari regard as the incarnation of the God of the Old Testament or as the reincarnation of Jesus Christ, who is also known by the Ethiopian title Janhoy.

== See also ==
- Theophory in the Bible
