= Sacred Name movement =

Religious movement emphasizing use of Hebrew names for God and biblical figures

The Sacred Name movement (SNM) is a movement within Adventism concerned with emphasizing the use of the Hebrew name of God, Yahweh. Influenced by Clarence Orvil Dodd, the movement considers the use of God's name as important as the Jewish festivals. SNM believers also generally observe many of the Old Testament laws and ceremonies such as the Seventh-day Sabbath, Torah festivals, and kashrut food laws. The movement also rejects the doctrine of the Trinity as unbiblical.

== History ==
The Sacred Name Movement arose in the early 20th century out of the Church of God (Seventh Day) movement. The movement was influenced by Joseph Franklin Rutherford after he changed the name of the main branch of the Bible Student movement to Jehovah's Witnesses in 1931. C. O. Dodd, a member of the Church of God (Seventh Day) who began to keep the Jewish festivals (including Passover) later adopted sacred name doctrines. To promote his views, Dodd began to publish The Faith magazine in 1937. American religious scholar J. Gordon Melton wrote, "No single force in spreading the Sacred Name movement was as important as The Faith magazine." As of 2016, The Faith is still published by the Assembly of Yahweh (Eaton, Michigan), founded by Dodd in 1939.

Angelo Traina, pastor of the Kingdom Truth Assembly, and contributor to The Faith, founded the Scripture Research Association in January 1950. Traina believed the New Testament was originally written in Aramaic and Hebrew, rather than Greek. The Scripture Research Association publishes Sacred Name Bibles, in addition to other literature.

Lorenzo D. Snow, a member of the Seventh Day Church of God in Fort Smith, Arkansas, affiliated with Dodd's Assembly of Yahweh, and received a license to preach in the early 1940s. He began publishing The Yahwist Field Reporter in 1945. In 1949, he moved to Emory, Texas and attended a camp meeting at which he and the other attendees formed the Assembly of Yahvah. Snow served as overseer until 1961.

Andrew N. Dugger, originally a leader of the Church of God (Seventh Day), split from that movement and founded a group headquartered in Jerusalem. Dugger's theology was similar to Dodd's, and although he used sacred names, he placed less emphasis on their use than other group in the Sacred Name movement. After Dugger's death, his son Charles Andy Dugger founded his own group, Workers Together with Elohim, also based in Jerusalem.

Jacob O. Meyer founded the Assemblies of Yahweh in Bethel, Pennsylvania in 1969. In 1980, former elders of the Assemblies of Yahweh left and founded the Assemblies of Yawheh in Messiah in Kansas. The new group changed their name to Yahweh's Assembly in Messiah in 1985 after the settlement of a trademark infringement lawsuit.

== Sacred Name Bibles ==
Most Sacred Name movement denominations use a Sacred Name Bible. Some Sacred Name Bibles are based on the King James Version or American Standard Version, but with some names and words changed to Hebraic forms. Other versions are original translations from Greek, Hebrew, Aramaic, and Syriac manuscripts, though giving less weight to the Greek manuscripts than other Bible translators. Angelo Traina, a disciple of Dodd, undertook the production of a Sacred Name edition of the Bible, publishing the Sacred Name New Testament in 1950 and the Holy Name Bible in 1963.

== See also ==
- Hebrew Roots
- Messianic Judaism
- Christian views on the Old Covenant
- Christian Zionism
- Ebionites
- Holy Name of Jesus
- Imiaslavie
- Judaizers
- Pronomianism

== Sources ==
- Chryssides, George D. (2004). "Sacred Name Movement". In Clarke, Peter (ed.). Encyclopedia of New Religious Movements. Routledge. pp. 543–544. ISBN 9781134499700.
- Chryssides, George D. (2012). "Sacred Name Movement". Historical Dictionary of New Religious Movements. Scarecrow Press. p. 301. ISBN 9780810879676.
- Frederickson, Nathan (2016). "Sacred Name Movement". In Kurian, George Thomas; Lamport, Mark A. (eds.). Encyclopedia of Christianity in the United States. Vol. 5. Rowman & Littlefield. pp. 2003–2005. ISBN 9781442244320.
- Melton, J. Gordon (1992). Encyclopedic Handbook of Cults in America. New York City: Garland Publishing. ISBN 978-0-8153-1140-9.
