= Sacred Name Bible =

Bible translations that use Hebraic forms of God's personal name (YHWH)

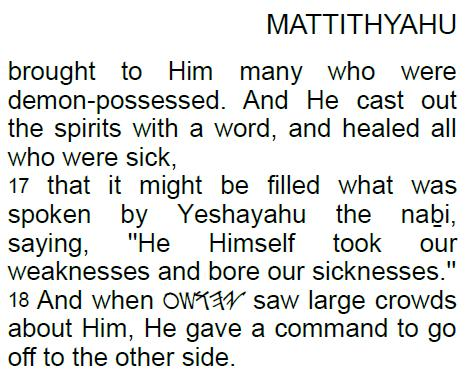
Excerpt from the Halleluyah Scriptures, a Sacred Name Bible that uses modern characters inspired by southern inscriptions of the Canaanite script (at times called Paleo-Hebrew since the 1950s) for some divine names and Yeshayahu for "Isaiah"

Sacred Name Bibles are Bible translations that consistently use Hebraic forms of the God of Israel's personal name, instead of traditional substitute titles such as LORD, in both the Old and New Testaments. Some Bible versions, such as the Jerusalem Bible, employ the name Yahweh, a transliteration of the Hebrew tetragrammaton (YHWH), in the English text of the Old Testament.

Instead of the traditional English form "Jesus", Sacred Name versions use a form that they believe reflects the Semitic original, such as Yahshua.

Some Sacred Name Bibles are available for download on the Web.

== Historical background ==
In ancient Israel, the Tetragrammaton (YHWH), commonly vocalized as Yahweh, was used as the personal Name of the Elohim of Israel. Evidence indicates that the Name remained in common use during the early Second Temple period; the Jewish Encyclopedia, for example, notes its preservation in personal names and liturgical expressions such as Hallelu-Yah (meaning "praise Yahweh"). Evidence for the use of the Name also comes from the fifth-century BCE Jewish community at Elephantine, whose Aramaic documents contain the form YHW and attest to a temple where sacrifices were offered to YHW.

During the Hellenistic period, however, Jewish practice increasingly restricted pronunciation of the Name Yahweh. The Jewish Encyclopedia states that at the beginning of the Hellenistic era its use became reserved for the Temple, where priests could pronounce the Name in the priestly benediction, while Adonai was used outside the Temple. This development was gradual rather than uniform: modern scholarship describes Second Temple Jewish evidence as reflecting diverse and overlapping practices concerning the speaking and writing of Yahweh, varying according to linguistic, geographical, and social context. Knowledge and ritual use of the Name therefore did not disappear at once, and Jewish sources indicate that its pronunciation continued in particular priestly and religious contexts after its use had become increasingly restricted.

YHWH occurs in the Hebrew Bible, and also within the Greek text in a few manuscripts of the Greek translation found at Qumran among the Dead Sea Scrolls. The Tetragrammaton does not occur in the surviving early manuscripts of the Greek New Testament; however, this does not in itself negate whether or not it appeared in the original manuscripts, which are no longer extant. Although the Greek forms Iao and Iave do occur in magical inscriptions in the Hellenistic Jewish texts of Philo, Josephus and the New Testament use the word Kyrios ("Lord") when citing verses where YHWH occurs in the Hebrew.

For centuries, Bible translators around the world did not transliterate or copy the tetragrammaton in their translations. For example, English Bible translators (Christian and Jewish) used LORD to represent it. Modern authorities on Bible translation have called for translating it with a vernacular word or phrase that would be locally meaningful. The Catholic Church has called for maintaining in the liturgy the tradition of using "the Lord" to represent the tetragrammaton, but does not forbid its use outside the liturgy, as is shown by the existence of Catholic Bibles such as the Jerusalem Bible (1966) and the New Jerusalem Bible (1985), where it appears as "Yahweh", and place names that incorporate the tetragrammaton are not affected.

A few Bible translators, with varying theological motivations, have taken a different approach to translating the tetragrammaton. In the 1800s–1900s at least three English translations contained a variation of YHWH. Two of these translations comprised only a portion of the New Testament. They did not restore YHWH throughout the body of the New Testament.

In the twentieth century, Rotherham's Emphasized Bible was the first to employ full transliteration of the tetragrammaton where it appears in the Bible (i.e., in the Old Testament). Angelo Traina's translation, The New Testament of our Messiah and Saviour Yahshua in 1950 also used it throughout to translate Κύριος, and The Holy Name Bible containing the Holy Name Version of the Old and New Testaments in 1963 was the first to systematically use a Hebrew form for sacred names throughout the Old and New Testament, becoming the first complete Sacred Name Bible.

=== Aramaic New Testament hypotheses ===
Some translators of Sacred Name Bibles hold to an 18th-century hypothesis within Biblical scholarship, first advanced by Gotthold Ephraim Lessing. It argues that the synoptic Gospels are Greek translations of an Aramaic Urgospel. The current consensus view held by almost all scholars of the New Testament is that all of its contents were originally written in Koine Greek. In the 20th-century, Matthew Black tried to advance Lessing's hypothesis further, but only was able to establish with some degree of certainty that some parts of the Gospel of Mark could derive from an Aramaic sayings-source or tradition. His work was heavily critiqued for its methodology. It is republished today with a critical preface lauding it as the "highmark" of an older theory, but describing consequent developments in scholarship.

Although no early manuscripts of the New Testament contain these names, some rabbinical translations of Matthew did use the tetragrammaton in part of the Hebrew New Testament. Sidney Jellicoe in The Septuagint and Modern Study (Oxford, 1968) states that the name YHWH appeared in Greek Old Testament texts written for Jews by Jews, often in the Paleo-Hebrew alphabet to indicate that it was not to be pronounced, or in Aramaic, or using the four Greek letters PIPI (Π Ι Π Ι) that physically imitate the appearance of the Hebrew-Aramaic Square Script יהוה, YHWH), and that Kyrios was a Christian introduction. Bible scholars and translators such as Eusebius and Jerome (translator of the Latin Vulgate) consulted the Hexapla, but did not attempt to preserve sacred names in Semitic forms. Justin Martyr (second century) argued that YHWH is not a personal name, writing of the "namelessness of God".

George Lamsa, the translator of The Holy Bible from Ancient Eastern Manuscripts: Containing the Old and New Testaments (1957), believed the New Testament was originally written in a Semitic language, not clearly differentiating between Syriac and Aramaic. However, despite his adherence to a Semitic original of the New Testament, Lamsa translated using the English word "Lord" instead of a Hebraic form of the divine name.

=== Reception ===
Sacred Name Bibles have had limited use compared with mainstream Christian and Jewish Bible translations. Only a relatively small number of English translations replace Jesus with Semitic forms such as Yeshua or Yahshua.

Sacred Name groups such as the Assemblies of Yahweh who use the form Yahshua similarly interpret the name as meaning "Yahweh (Yah) is salvation (shua)" incorporating the shortened form of Yahweh's Name.

Most English Bible translations substitute the tetragrammaton with the title LORD where the tetragrammaton occurs in the Old Testament rather than use a transliteration into English. This pattern is followed in languages around the world, as translators have substituted sacred names without preserving the Hebraic forms, often preferring local names for the creator or highest deity, conceptualizing accuracy as semantic rather than phonetic.

The translator Joseph Bryant Rotherham lamented not making his work into a Sacred Name Bible by using the more accurate name Yahweh in his translation (pp. 20–26), though he also said, "I trust that in a popular version like the present my choice will be understood even by those who may be slow to pardon it." (p. xxi).

== List of translations ==
=== Transliterated Sacred Name Bibles ===
These Bibles systematically transliterate the tetragrammaton (usually as Yahweh) in both the Old and New Testaments, as well as a Semitic form of the name of Jesus, such as Yahshua or Yeshua. They consider the names of both God the Father, and God the Son, to be sacred.

- The New Testament of our Messiah and Saviour Yahshua (1950)
- Holy Name Bible (1963)
- Restoration of Original Sacred Name Bible (1970)
- The Sacred Scriptures Bethel Edition (1981)
- The Book of Yahweh: The Holy Scriptures (1987)
- Sacred Scriptures, Family of Yah Edition (2000)
- The Holy Bible – Urim-Thummim Version (2001)
- The Word of Yahweh (2003)
- Mickelson Clarified Translation (2008, 2013, 2015, 2019)
- Hebraic Roots Bible (2009, 2012)
- The Restoration Study Bible (2011)
- Names of God Bible (2011, 2014)
- The Interpreted New Testament (2020)
- The Original Bible for Modern Readers (2017)

=== Tetragrammaton Sacred Name Bibles ===
These Sacred Name Bibles use the tetragrammaton without vowels. They follow this practice in both the Old and New Testaments (though some translations are not complete).

- The Scriptures (ISR) Version (1993, 1998, 2009)
- Hebraic-Roots Version (2001, 2004)
- Restoration Scriptures: True Name Edition (2004)
- Zikarown Say'fer Memorial Scroll (2004)
- Sacred Name King James Bible (2005)
- The Seventh Millennium Version (2007)
- The Aramaic English New Testament (2008)
- HalleluYah Scriptures (2009, 2015) (Note: It is not clear if this is the same translation as "The Scriptures" by the Institute for Scripture Research)
- Abrahamic Faith Nazarene Hebraic Study Scriptures (2010)
- The Restored Name King James Version (1998)
- His Name Tanakh (In Progress)
- Neno La Yahweh Swahili version (2014)
- NJV Bible – New Jerusalem Version (2019)
- Cepher (2013)

=== Limited Sacred Name Bibles ===
Some translations use a form of "Jehovah" or "Yahweh" only sporadically:

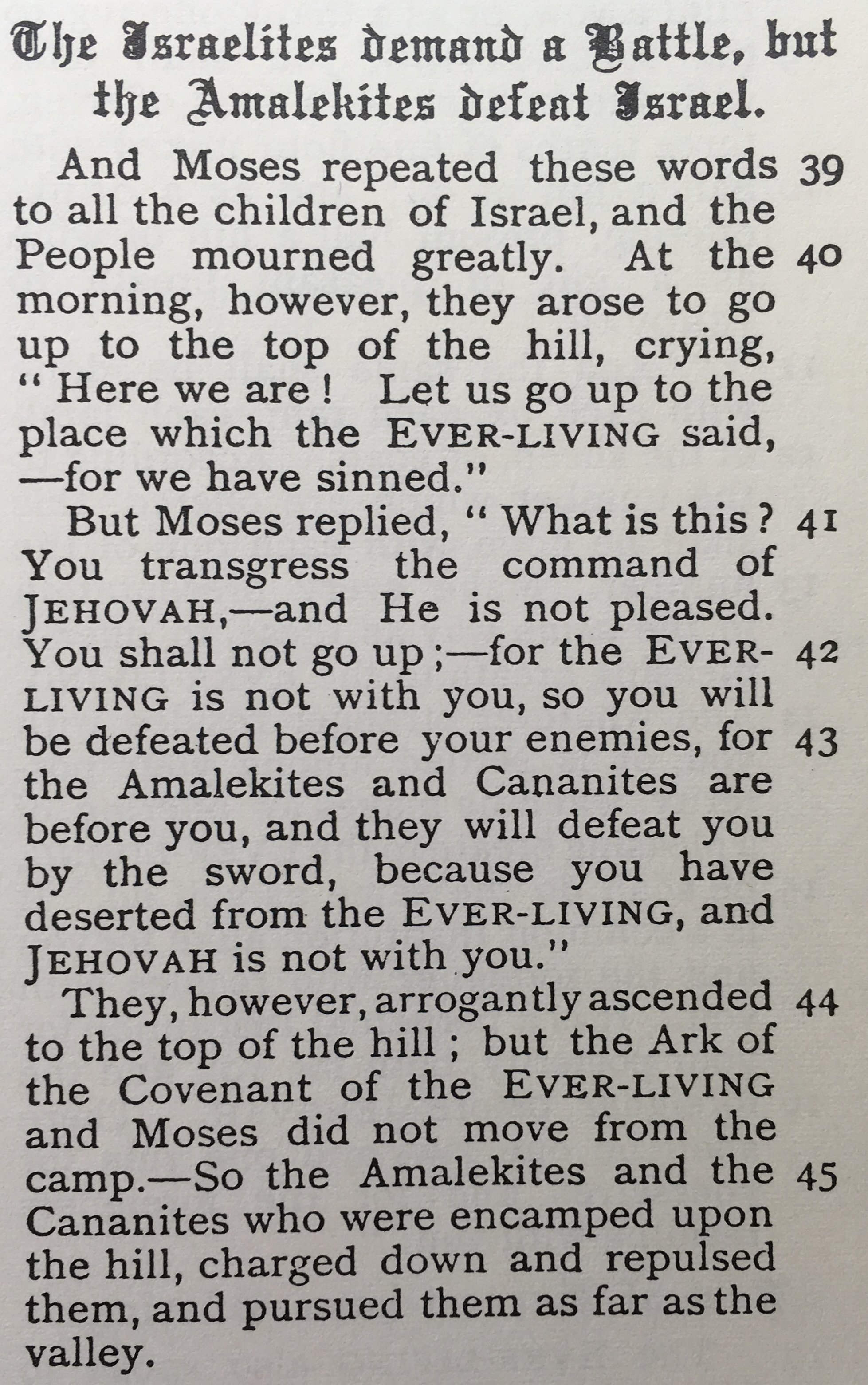
Inconsistent translation of tetragrammaton, both "Ever-living" for the tetragrammaton, as well as "Jehovah", Numbers 14, Ferrar Fenton Bible

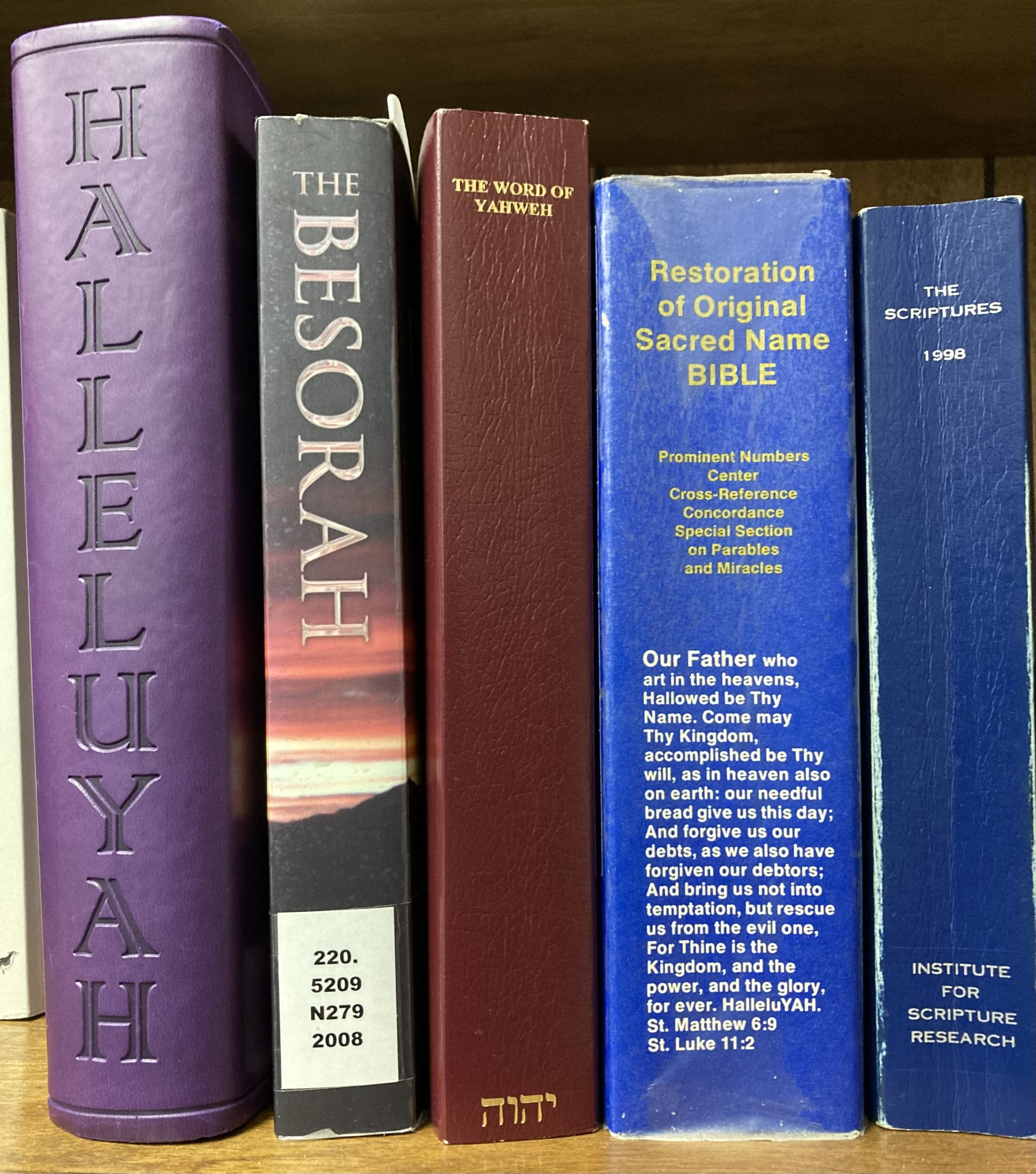
Five Sacred Name Bibles

- The Complete Bible: An American Translation by John Merlin Powis Smith (1939), e.g. Exodus 3:15, 6:3, 17:15
- Holman Christian Standard Bible (2004, 2010), the tetragrammaton is transliterated "Yahweh" in 495 places in its 2010 revision [654 times in the 2009 edition]. In Psalm 29:1, 2 Chron. 30:8, Isaiah 24:5, and Jeremiah 26:9 it translates the tetragrammaton once as "Yahweh" and once as LORD. In 2 Chronicles 14:11, it translates the tetragrammaton three times as LORD and once as "Yahweh". In Job 1:21, it translates the tetragrammaton twice as LORD and one as "Yahweh". In Psalm 135, it translates the tetragrammaton 14 times as Yahweh and twice as LORD.
- The Emphatic Diaglott (1864), a translation of the New Testament by Benjamin Wilson, the name Jehovah appears eighteen times.
- King James Version (1611), renders Jehovah in Exodus 6:3, Psalm 83:18, Isaiah 12:2, Isaiah 26:4, and three times in compound place names at Genesis 22:14, Exodus 17:15 and Judges 6:24.
- Webster's Bible Translation (1833), by Noah Webster, a revision of the King James Bible, contains the form Jehovah in all cases where it appears in the original King James Version, as well as another seven times in Isaiah 51:21, Jeremiah 16:21; 23:6; 32:18; 33:16, Amos 5:8, and Micah 4:13.
- The English Revised Version (1885), renders the tetragrammaton as Jehovah where it appears in the King James Version, and another eight times in Exodus 6:2–8, Psalm 68:20, Isaiah 49:14, Jeremiah 16:21, and Habakkuk 3:19.
- The Ferrar Fenton Bible innovatively uses the phrase "Ever-living" for the tetragrammaton, as well as "Jehovah", even in the same paragraph, such as in Numbers 14:41–43.
- Amplified Bible (1954, 1987), generally uses LORD, but translates Exodus 6:3 as: "I appeared to Abraham, to Isaac, and to Jacob as God Almighty [El-Shaddai], but by My name the LORD [Yahweh—the redemptive name of God] I did not make Myself known to them [in acts and great miracles]."
- New English Bible (NT 1961, OT 1970), published by Oxford University Press uses Jehovah in Exodus 3:15 and 6:3, and in four place names at Genesis 22:14, Exodus 17:15, Judges 6:24 and Ezekiel 48:35.
- New Living Translation (1996, 2004), produced by Tyndale House Publishers as a successor to the Living Bible, generally uses LORD, but uses literal names whenever the text compares it to another divine name, such as its use of Yahweh in Exodus 3:15 and 6:3.
- Bible in Basic English (1949, 1964), uses "Yahweh" eight times, including Exodus 6:2–3.
- The American King James Version (1999) by Michael Engelbrite renders Jehovah in all the places where it appears in the original King James Version.
- New World Translation of the Holy Scriptures (2013) – Uses Jehovah over 7,000 times

These versions use either "Yahweh" or "Jehovah" only in the Old Testament:

- Young's Literal Translation (1862) – Uses Jehovah.
- The Darby Bible (1890) – Uses Jehovah. Plus Jehovah appears in many NT footnotes.
- American Standard Version (1901) – Uses Jehovah.
- Rotherham's Emphasized Bible (1902) – Uses Yahweh.
- Jerusalem Bible (1966) – Uses Yahweh.
- Living Bible (1971) – Uses Jehovah 500 times.
- The Bible in Living English (1972) – Uses Jehovah.
- Green's Literal Translation (1985) – Uses Jehovah.
- New Jerusalem Bible (1985) – Uses Yahweh.
- The Recovery Version (1999) – Uses Jehovah. Plus Jehovah appears in many NT footnotes.
- World English Bible (2000) – Uses Yahweh.
- Lexham English Bible (2011) – Uses Yahweh.
- Julia E. Smith Bible (1876) – Uses Jehovah
- Legacy Standard Bible (2021) – Uses Yahweh.

The Literal Standard Version uses the unpointed tetragrammaton "YHWH" only where it occurs in the Hebrew text.

=== Non-English ===
- The French Bible de Jérusalem uses the form Yahvé in place of the Tetragrammaton.
- An Indonesian translation produced by the Sacred Name Movement, Kitab Suci, uses Hebraic forms of sacred names in the Old and New Testaments (Soesilo 2001:416), based on Shellabear's translation.
- A French translation, by André Chouraqui, uses Hebraic forms in the Old and New Testaments. Chourraqui's translation has also been translated into Portuguese.
- The Spanish language Reina Valera Bible and most of its subsequent revisions uses the Sacred Name in the Old Testament as "Jehová" starting in Genesis 2:4, with the notable exception of the Reina Valera Contemporánea, a 2011 revision which replaces "Jehová" (Spanish for Jehovah) with "El Señor" (Spanish for "The Lord").
- In the Philippines, the Magandang Balita Biblia–Tagalog Popular Version uses Yahweh.
- In Thailand, the Thai bible translation (1985) uses "Jehovah" in the Old Testament where the Tetragrammaton exists.

== See also ==
- Tetragrammaton in the New Testament

== Bibliography ==
- Bainbridge, John T. Translating Κύριος after 600 Years of “the Lord’s” Faithful Service. The Bible Translator 71, no. 3 (2020): 331–356.
- Bivin, David. 1991a. "Jehovah"—A Christian Misunderstanding. Jerusalem Perspective Vol. 4.6: 5,6.
- Bivin, David. 1991b. The Fallacy of Sacred Name Bibles. Jerusalem Perspective Vol. 4.6: 7,12.
- Case, Andrew. 2020. Pronouncing & Translating the Divine Name: History & Practice. Open Access
- Daams, Nico. 2011. Translating YHWH 'Elohim. The Bible Translator 62.4: 226–235.
- King, Phil. 2014. Perspectives on translating YHWH in Papua New Guinea. The Bible Translator 65.2:185–204.
- Neufeld, Don. 1962. An examination of the claims of the Sacred Name Movement (concluded). The Ministry 35.11: 13–16, 36.
- Moomo, David. 2005. Translating יהוה (YHWH) into African languages. Scriptura 88 pp. 151–160.
- Pritz, Ray. 1991. The Divine Name in the Hebrew New Testament. Jerusalem Perspective, Vol. 4:2 10–12.
- Rösel, Martin (2007). "The Reading and Translation of the Divine Name in the Masoretic Tradition and the Greek Pentateuch". Journal for the Study of the Old Testament. 31 (4): 411–428. doi:10.1177/0309089207080558. S2CID 170886081.
- Smith, Mark S. 2010. God in Translation: Deities in Cross-Cultural Discourse in the Biblical World. Grand Rapids: Eerdmans Publishing.
- Soesilo, Daud. 2001. Translating the Names of God: recent experience from Indonesia and Malaysia. The Bible Translator 52.4: 414–423.
- The Sacred Name YHWH: A Scriptural Study, (3rd ed). 2002. Garden Grove, California: Qadesh La Yahweh Press. Open Access
- The Scriptures 1993, 1998, 2009. Northriding, South Africa: Institute for Scripture Research.
- Trimm, James (translator) 2005. The Hebraic-Roots Version Scriptures. Institute for Scripture Research (publisher).
- Unseth, Peter. 2011. Sacred Name Bible translations in English: a fast-growing phenomenon. The Bible Translator 62.3: 185–194.
