= Angelo Traina =

Sicilian American biblical scholar (1889–1971)

- Born: January 22, 1889; Sicily
- Died: November 4, 1971 (aged 82)
- Movement: Sacred Name Movement

Academic work
- Discipline: Biblical studies
- Notable works: "The New Testament of our Messiah and Saviour Yahshua"

Angelo Benedetto Traina (January 22, 1889 – November 4, 1971) was a biblical scholar, best known for his emphasis on what he called restoring "Semitic proper names to their Aramaic and Hebrew forms".

== Life ==
Traina was born in Sicily into a Catholic family. They later moved to New York City, where he left home at the age of 13, ending up in Buffalo. Part of a group of drinking and gambling youths, he was part of a conspiracy to disrupt a revival meeting, but instead converted, joining a Protestant church. He later worked for Aimee Semple McPherson. He credited the Millerism movement, a group that stressed keeping the sabbath, as an influence in his life.

His biblical studies resulted in placing a special emphasis on the Hebrew form of God's name. This led to him translating The Sacred Name New Testament (1950), with C. O. Dodd, the first example of a sacred name Bible. He went on to translate the Hebrew and Aramaic scriptures also, in The Holy Name Bible containing the Holy Name Version of the Old and New Testaments (1963). His translation was based on the King James Version, but "with special emphasis on the use of 'Yahweh' for the Father and 'Yahshua' for Jesus.

The name "Yahvahshua" was created by Angelo Traina, an Italian-American Bible scholar and translator, in the mid-20th century. Traina was a prominent figure in the Sacred Name Movement, which sought to restore the original Hebrew names and words in the Bible.

Traina's work, "The New Testament of our Messiah and Saviour Yahshua" (1950), conceived and introduced the name "Yahvahshua" as a way to combine the divine name "Yahvah" (YHVH) with the name "Yahshua" (Jesus). Since then, the name "Yahvahshua" has been adopted by some Sacred Name groups and individuals. This name was later adobted by Lloyd Snow and R Favitta, into an edited version of The Restoration of Original Sacred Name Bible.

While Traina is credited with popularizing the name, it is unlikely that similar combinations of the divine name with "Yahvah" and "Yahshua" existed in earlier writings or oral traditions within the Sacred Name Movement.

A fifth edition was published in 1989 by the Scripture Research Association, based in New Jersey and founded by him. He was the first Bible translator to deliberately transliterate Hebrew forms of divine names. A number of others have followed his example in this, including Jacob O. Meyer producing the Sacred Scriptures Bethel Edition.

He believed that the Hebrew form of the names of God were vital for believers of all times. He believed that most of the New Testament was originally written in Hebrew, then later translated into Greek. He taught that the Greek copies available have erred in their translation of the Hebrew Tetragrammaton by Greek κυριος. Also, he rejected the Greek spelling which is the basis for the English form "Jesus", using a Hebrew-based form "Yahshua".

He also wrote many pamphlets and articles, many of which were published in the magazine The Faith. Traina was one of the early foundational figures in the Sacred Name Movement, having been a featured speaker at the 1938 Feast of Tabernacles Camp Meeting near Warrior, Alabama, an event which is seen by some as the launching of the movement, a movement that has spread from the USA to other countries, such as Indonesia, Kenya, and the Philippines.

Following Traina's lead, many Sacred Name Bible translations have been produced. In 2011, there were at least 20 such English translation that presented at least parts of the Bible using Hebrew-based forms of sacred names. Traina's innovative work has spawned the translation of Sacred Name Bibles in other places, e.g. Indonesia. The idea of Sacred Name Bible translations spawned by Traina has been attacked by some, including David Bivin.

== Sources ==
- Paul, William E. (2009). Traina, A. B. McFarland. p. 230. ISBN 9780786442430.
