= Jacob O. Meyer =

Founder, president and directing elder of the Assemblies of Yahweh

Elder Jacob O. Meyer

Personal life
- Born: November 11, 1934 Bethel, Berks County, Pennsylvania, US
- Died: April 9, 2010 (aged 75)
- Spouse: Head Deaconess Ruth F. Meyer
- Notable works: The Memorial Name Yahweh; Commentary on Galatians; Commentary on Micah; Commentary on Revelation; Biblical Ecclesiastical Assembly Administration; Israel in the Wilderness; The Mark of the Beast
- Known for: Religious teacher, composer, singer, musician, writer, poet

Religious life
- Religion: Assemblies of Yahweh
- Founder of: Assemblies of Yahweh

Elder Jacob O. Meyer (November 11, 1934 – April 9, 2010) was an American religious leader, best known for founding the Assemblies of Yahweh. He also worked as a farmer, broadcaster and author.

== Early life ==
Meyer was born in Bethel, Berks County, Pennsylvania. He was raised within a conservative, religious Pennsylvania Dutch household and was active in his local Anabaptist congregation. He enrolled at the Evangelical Congregational School of Theology (now the Evangelical Seminary) in Myerstown, Pennsylvania, where he participated in theological training, conducted meetings, and coordinated biblical classes. He later attended Dropsie University in Philadelphia and at Johns Hopkins University in Baltimore.

Meyer first encountered the name Yahweh in the late 1950s through an ordained minister of a prominent denomination during a course in Biblical studies. According to this instruction, the true name of God was Yahweh, a point that shaped his subsequent theological direction. He and his wife began searching for religious groups that shared this belief. Their search brought them into contact with various Sacred Name groups, which at the time were small and often doctrinally fragmented.

When no existing organization matched their convictions, Meyer briefly considered a plan in which his family would withdraw from society, save their tithes, and eventually issue a single public proclamation of the message—perhaps through a newspaper notice or similar medium. Meyer later concluded that such isolation was "not the will of Yahweh," and resumed seeking groups committed to advancing the Sacred Name message. Although he encountered several such bodies, he judged many to contain significant doctrinal inconsistencies. During this period he assisted in publishing the Sacred Name Herald before returning to Bethel in 1964.

In 1965, following a radio broadcast, Meyer was invited to begin an assembly-type organization. He agreed, saying, "If it be Yahweh's will." At thirty years old, he was anointed with oil, marking the beginning of the Assemblies of Yahweh. Meyer later noted that this age corresponded with the Scriptural requirement for the installation of priests in the Hebrew Scriptures—a parallel he viewed as confirming the timing of his calling.

== Assemblies of Yahweh ==
As head (“directing elder”) of the Assemblies of Yahweh, Meyer became a full-time minister in 1970. During the 1970s, he also completed a short part-time academic program that led to the award of an associate degree from Thomas Edison State College. The name “Assemblies of Yahweh” derives from the Hebrew phrase “qahal Yahweh,” used in reference to the Israelites in Deuteronomy 23:1–8. Elsewhere in Scripture, the related expression Edah Yahweh appears. Meyer composed the theme song of the Assemblies of Yahweh, Under Zion's Banner.

=== Missionary journeys ===
Meyer became a prolific contributor to the ministry’s publications, a translator of the conservative Sacred Name Bible known as the Sacred Scriptures Bethel Edition, and the author of several books. He also undertook extensive international travel, distributing literature and visiting individuals who had expressed interest in the ministry’s message. His journeys included North and South America, Germany, Berlin, France, Poland, England, Ireland, the Philippines, Thailand, India, Trinidad, Dominica, St. Lucia, and Israel. On several of these missions he was accompanied by his wife.

He also served as a board member of the National Association of Shortwave Broadcasting and was elected to the office of township constable of Bethel County.

== Teachings ==
=== Commandment-keeping ===
A central emphasis of Meyer’s preaching was the necessity of commandment-keeping. The ethos of the Assemblies of Yahweh is rooted in obedience to the law, reflecting both the ministry’s Statement of Doctrine—authored by Meyer—and his exposition of Biblical commandments. He frequently devoted sermons to individual laws, especially those drawn from the Ten Commandments, such as in the sermon “Thou Shall Not Commit Adultery,” where he surveyed Scriptural references from both the Old and New Testaments and explored the law’s implications for daily life. These examinations were often expanded and formalized in articles printed in The Sacred Name Broadcaster.

=== Spirituality ===
His sermons on spirituality frequently centered on prayer, quiet study, and disciplined introspection.

In his series “A New Young Israel Emerges,” Meyer compared the Israelites who entered the Promised Land with the Assemblies of Yahweh, contrasting them with the Israelites who perished in the wilderness.

=== Love ===
Each year, Meyer delivered the first message of the Feast of Tabernacles on the subject of love. His teachings frequently examined the Greek terms agape and Philadelphia, with particular focus on the latter. He rejected mainstream Christianity’s concept of love, teaching instead that true love can only be understood through obedience to Yahweh’s commandments, since Yahweh’s loving character is revealed in the law.

Meyer also connected love with unity within the Assembly, teaching believers how to express love toward Yahweh—such as in the sermon “Loving Yahweh from the Heart” (2008)—and toward fellow human beings, including the principles of the Great Commandment. The characteristics of the Philadelphia assembly in Revelation 3:8—faithfulness to the Name and good works—were held by Meyer as ideals for the Assemblies of Yahweh. He emphasized love of the brethren especially in The Narrow Way publications.

=== Prophecy ===
Meyer frequently preached Sabbath sermons on end-time prophecy, comparing contemporary world events with Biblical predictions and arguing that the Assemblies of Yahweh was living in the end times. His series “Age Ending Events Surveyed” (2006) is an example of this focus.

Meyer refrained from setting specific dates for prophetic fulfillment, citing Matthew 25:13.

=== Piety ===
Meyer emphasized sanctification, holiness, dedication, and the rejection of pagan customs and practices—including Easter, Halloween, and Christmas. He also spoke against worldly dress styles, urging modesty and reverence in worship, including formal attire on holy days.

In his series “Become an Iconoclast,” Meyer taught that believers must resist worldliness as the Maccabees once did. Prior to the Three Pilgrimage Festivals, he instructed the leadership to prepare sermons promoting purification and spiritual renewal, such as “Let Us Wash Our Hearts.”

=== Other religious groups ===
Meyer has rejected other groups in the Sacred Name Movement as unsound.

== Death ==
Meyer died on April 9, 2010 at the age of 75.

I want and desire that this organisation will be, shall be and always will endure as Philadelphia

— Elder Jacob O. Meyer, excerpt from his will for the Assemblies of Yahweh

Meyer's sermons and literature are still used within the ministry. His sermons are still broadcast on WMLK and streamed on Tunein.com. The ministry is now run by his children.

== Ruth F. Meyer ==
Elder Meyer met Ruth Meyer on the first day of high school. Her family had relocated from Lancaster County in 1945, settling northeast of Bethel.

Both Meyers had long held an interest in the Bible, but this interest deepened after their marriage, particularly following their acceptance of the Sacred Names in 1962 and the conviction that all commandments were to be observed. In the earliest days of the ministry, it was simply Elder Jacob O. Meyer, Ruth Meyer, and their children working together. In 1965, Elder Meyer was anointed into the ministry, and he subsequently anointed his wife and children.

According to the June 2018 issue of the Sacred Name Broadcaster (Volume L, Number 3), she served in a range of roles—including sound ‘recording technician’, receptionist, secretary, typist, mail clerk, printing assistant, and “chief cook”.

Beyond daily operations, Ruth Meyer also acted as a trusted advisor to Meyer and was consulted on the founding of the Sacred Name Broadcaster and other major projects. She personally printed the original covers of the Sacred Name Broadcaster and delivered the first completed issue to Meyer in the summer of 1968. She later accompanied him to Israel for periods of study and research related to the ministry’s educational aims.

Ruth Meyer continues to serve as the Head Deaconess in the Assemblies of Yahweh. She also oversees the preparation of bread prior to the Feast of Unleavened Bread.

== See also ==
- Names of God in Christianity
- Names of God in Judaism
- Yahshua
