= Twelve Tribes communities =

Cult and new religious movement

Twelve Tribes
- Classification: Messianic Judaism (Note: "In attempting to restart the New Testament Church, the group has developed a physical and artistic culture that is its interpretation of first century Messianic Judaism translated into 20th century terms."); Christian fundamentalism
- Structure: Apostolic Council
- Region: North America, South America, Western Europe, Australia
- Founder: Elbert "Gene" Spriggs
- Origin: 1972; Chattanooga, Tennessee, United States
- Members: ~5,000
- Official website: twelvetribes.org

The Twelve Tribes, formerly known as the Vine Christian Community Church, the Northeast Kingdom Community Church, the Messianic Communities, and the Community Apostolic Order, is an international organisation that originated in the United States. Scholarship from experts in the social psychology of exploitative and abusive relationships, and others in clinical social work, characterises the group as a cult, as does the SPLC. Sociologists of religion characterise the group as a new religious movement. It was founded by Gene Spriggs and it sprang out of the Jesus movement in Chattanooga, Tennessee, in 1972. The group calls itself an attempt to recreate the 1st-century church as it is described in the Book of Acts.

The group's origins in Chattanooga led to planted churches in surrounding areas. In the late seventies, the group established a community in Island Pond, Vermont. The group eventually left Tennessee and primarily moved to Vermont. The Twelve Tribes's beliefs resemble those of Christian fundamentalism, the Hebrew Roots movement, Messianic Judaism, and the Sacred Name Movement; however, the group refuses to align itself with any denomination or movement because it believes that all other denominations are fallen. Additionally, the group exclusively uses its own recreation of the original Hebrew name of Jesus, "Yahshua". Believing that the name "Yahshua" represents the nature of Jesus, the group gives each member a Hebrew name that is meant to reflect the personality of the individual.

The group has been criticized for its beliefs and practices, including its supremacist views towards Black and Jewish people. The group's teachings have been characterized as racist, misogynistic and homophobic, and ex-members accuse it of inflicting excessive corporal punishment, failing to stop child sexual abuse, and exploiting members for labor. Authorities removed forty children from the group in Germany after a journalist showed evidence of child abuse. The action was upheld by the European Court of Human Rights.

Common sources of funding that enable the group to interact with the public include restaurants like The Yellow Deli and community marketplaces.

== History ==
=== Origins ===
The origins of the Twelve Tribes can be traced back to the "Light Brigade for Jesus Christ", a 1972 teenagers' ministry. The ministry operated out of "The Lighthouse", a small coffee shop in the home of Gene Spriggs, also known as Yoneq, and his wife, Marsha. The Light Brigade began living communally and opened a restaurant, "The Yellow Deli", while its members were attending several churches, before they decided to join the First Presbyterian Church. Members of the Light Brigade, while affiliated with First Presbyterian, caused friction within its establishment by bringing in anyone who was willing to come with them, including members of different social classes and racial groups, a practice which was not engaged in at that time. On January 12, 1975, the group arrived at First Presbyterian only to find out that the service had been cancelled for the Super Bowl, leading the group to form The Vine Christian Community Church. During this time, the group "planted" churches, each with its own Yellow Deli, in Dalton and Trenton, Georgia; Mentone, Alabama; and Dayton, Tennessee.

Their withdrawal from the religious mainstream turned what had been a friction-filled relationship into an outcry against them. They began holding their own services, which they called "Critical Mass" in Warner Park in Chattanooga, Tennessee, appointing elders and baptizing people outside any denominational authority. The deteriorating relationship between the group and the religious and secular Chattanooga community attracted the attention of The Parents' Committee to Free Our Children from the Children of God and the Citizen's Freedom Foundation who characterized the group as a cult and described Spriggs as a cult leader. Starting the summer of 1976, anti-cultist Ted Patrick began a series of deprogrammings that sought to convince Twelve Tribes members to leave the Twelve Tribes community. The group nevertheless largely ignored the negative press and the wider world in general, and continued to operate its businesses opening the Areopagus café and a second local Yellow Deli in downtown Chattanooga. In 1978, Bryan College in Dayton, Tennessee, Tennessee Temple University in Chattanooga and Covenant College located in Georgia near Chattanooga, issued edicts banning students from patronizing the Yellow Deli.

In 1978, an invitation was received from a small church in Island Pond, Vermont, for Spriggs to minister there; the offer was declined but the group began moving in stages to the rural town, naming the church there The Northeast Kingdom Community Church. One of Patrick's last deprogramming cases in Chattanooga occurred in 1980; it involved a police detective who, according to Jean Swantko, had his 27-year-old daughter arrested on a falsified warrant to facilitate her deprogramming, with the support of local judges. The group continued moving, closing down all of its Yellow Delis and associated churches except for the one in Dalton. At one point, a leader conceded that the group was deeply in debt before closing the Dalton church down and moving the last members to Vermont.

=== Move to Vermont ===
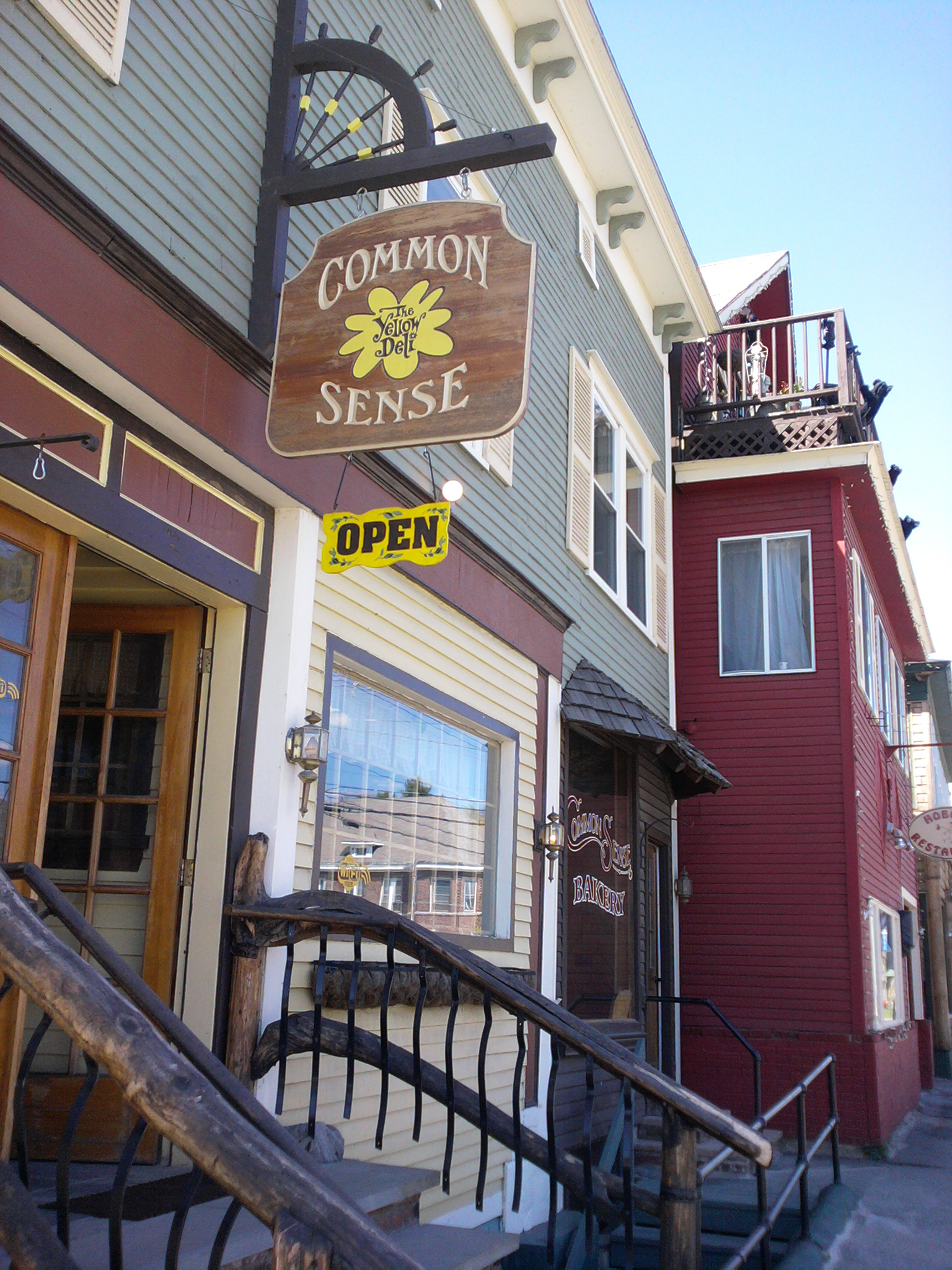
Common Sense Café and Yellow Deli in Island Pond, Vermont; owned and operated by Twelve Tribes. Permanently closed, as of 2019

The move to Vermont, combined with an initial period of economic hardship, caused some members to leave. The Citizen's Freedom Foundation conducted several meetings in Barton to draw attention to the group. The Citizen's Freedom Foundation had made allegations of mind control in Chattanooga, but now it made accusations of child abuse. In 1983, charges were brought against Charles "Eddie" Wiseman (an elder in the group) for misdemeanor simple assault; this, combined with multiple child custody cases, formed the basis for a search warrant. On June 22, 1984, Vermont State Police and Vermont Social Rehabilitation Services seized 112 children. Forty cases were dismissed as the parents refused to give the names of their children. Due to what the group perceived were a massive misunderstanding of the events and concerns leading up to and surrounding the raid, its members began formal relationships with their neighbors. Two months after the raid, the case against Wiseman fell apart after the main witness recanted, saying he was under duress from the anticult movement. The case was later dropped in 1985 after a judge ruled that Wiseman had been denied his right to a speedy trial. Eddie Wiseman's public defender, Jean Swantko, who had been present during the raid, later joined the Twelve Tribes and married Wiseman.

The group had become more isolationist after the group's departure from Chattanooga. Now realizing that this had caused outsiders to view the group with suspicion, the group changed tactics and became more open, establishing more cordial relationships with neighbors and authorities.

In about 1985, Gene Spriggs said he had received revelation about the Book of Daniel. Spriggs believed that his community would bring about the return of Jesus. The group started to believe that it was the spiritual Israel. About this time the community began referring to Jesus by his likely name in Hebrew, Yahshua, and members of the community started being given Hebrew names—Spriggs took the name "Yoneq". The group also started to incorporate Israeli dancing and folk music into their traditions. In the summer of 1987 the entire community in Island Pond was baptized in a ritual that, one scholar wrote, "[washed] themselves from the perceived flaws of contemporary Christianity."

During the 1980s, Twelve Tribes members followed Grateful Dead tours by bus, recruiting members from their concerts.

=== Expansion ===
"We Need Radical Change", an example of Twelve Tribes "free paper" commonly distributed at events as a form of evangelism

By 1989, the church had become widely accepted in Island Pond and grew substantially during the 1980s and 1990s, opening branches in several different countries, including the Czech Republic, Canada, Australia, Brazil, Spain, Germany, Argentina, and the United Kingdom. During this expansion in the early 1990s, the group used the name Messianic Communities, until 1995 when the group became known as the Twelve Tribes.

Through the mid-2000s, the group remained controversial, with allegations of child labor, custodial interference, and illegal homeschooling. In 2006, the Tribes re-established a community in Chattanooga. This group also established its 12th and final tribe, Benjamin—named after the historical Tribe of Benjamin of Israel—centered around the American southeast. In 2006, the group held a reunion in Chattanooga commemorating the occasion. The Tribes opened a new Yellow Deli in Chattanooga in 2008, nearly 30 years after leaving Chattanooga.

=== Death of the group's founder ===
The founder of the Tribes, Elbert Eugene Spriggs Jr. (May 18, 1937 – January 11, 2021), died in 2021 while visiting his Hiddenite, North Carolina, property. Within the Tribes, Spriggs was also known as "the anointed one" and by the Hebrew name "Yoneq".

=== Marshall Fire ===
In December 2021, a fire broke out in Boulder County, Colorado. In June 2023, the Boulder County Sheriff's Office issued its investigative summary of the fire in which it concluded that the Marshall Fire originated from two sources, one of them being a slash burn intentionally started on the Twelve Tribes residential property six days prior on December 24, 2021, the second later fire being ignited by sparking power lines operated by Xcel Energy. The slash burn was visited by local firefighters after a community member noted the size of the fire. However, the responders were reportedly unconcerned with the fire. A resident at the property told detectives that he allowed the fire to burn to coals at which point he covered the fire with dirt, but did not extinguish the coals with water. Criminal charges were not brought against those at the property as slash burning was not illegal in Boulder County. In September 2025, Xcel agreed to pay $640 million to plaintiffs in a civil lawsuit. The Twelve Tribes was not named as a defendant in the lawsuit.

== Beliefs and practices ==
A Twelve Tribes dance

Scholars have described the Twelve Tribes as a communal new religious movement, a Christian-based nontraditional movement, and a cult. The Twelve Tribes' beliefs resemble those of Christian fundamentalism, the Hebrew Roots movement, Messianic Judaism and the Sacred Name Movement; however, the group believes that all other Christian denominations are "fallen" and it refuses to align itself with any denomination or movement. The cult's practices include child labor, which has resulted in legal action against it. It believes that for the messiah to return, the Church needs to be restored to its original form as described in Acts 2:38–42 and Acts 4:32–37. This restoration is not merely the restoration of the 1st-century Church, but the creation of a new Israel consisting of Twelve Tribes, which would be located in twelve geographic regions. Part of this process of restoration is the return to observing the sabbath, maintaining some of the Mosaic law, including dietary laws and the Jewish holidays. Its interpretation of the restoration of Israel has led the group to believe that the end times have arrived. On April 22, 2022 (Passover), the Tribes began a 49-year "race". The Tribes expects Yahshua to return in the 50th year, which will be a year of Jubilee. The Tribes attaches significance to this as the year 2070 is about 100 years since the founding of the Light Brigade.

One noted aspect of the group is its insistence on using the name "Yahshua" for Jesus. Believing that the name "Yahshua" represents the nature of Jesus, the group bestows upon each member a Hebrew name that is meant to reflect the personality of the individual.

The group believes there are Three Eternal Destinies. It believes that after the Fall of Man, every person was given a conscience, and that after dying, every person goes to a state of being called death regardless of their faith. Upon the future second coming, believers will be brought back for the thousand years to reign with "Yahshua" before the last judgment. At the end of this millennium, all of the nonbelievers will be judged according to their deeds and put into one of two groups: the righteous and the filthy/unjust. The filthy and the unjust will be sent to the lake of fire while the righteous will go on into eternity and fill the universe.

After relocating to Island Pond, the Tribes developed a distinctive style of dress. Men wore modest, long shirts paired with vests and tied their shoulder-length hair back in a club. Women dressed in long pinafores, skirts, or pantaloons with loose-fitting blouses. They kept their hair long and, following 1 Corinthians 11:5, covered their heads during church services with a headscarf—a symbol of submission to their husbands and to the elders, who themselves submit to the authority of Yahshua. Their diet centered on whole-grain bread, which they regarded as nourishment for both body and soul.

=== Leadership and organizational structure ===
The leadership of the group is structured as a series of Councils, which consist of local councils, regional councils, and a global Apostolic Council; the group is also overseen within these councils by a fluid number of teachers, deacons, deaconesses, elders, and apostles. Gene Spriggs is highly regarded as the first person to open up his home to members, but members state that he is not viewed as a spiritual figurehead.

In the United States, the group operates as a 501(d) organization (a for-profit organization with a religious purpose and a common treasury). The community pays property taxes, but the 501(d) structure tends to result in no income tax liability. The group operates as a tax-exempt religious organization in Australia.

=== Courtship and marriage ===
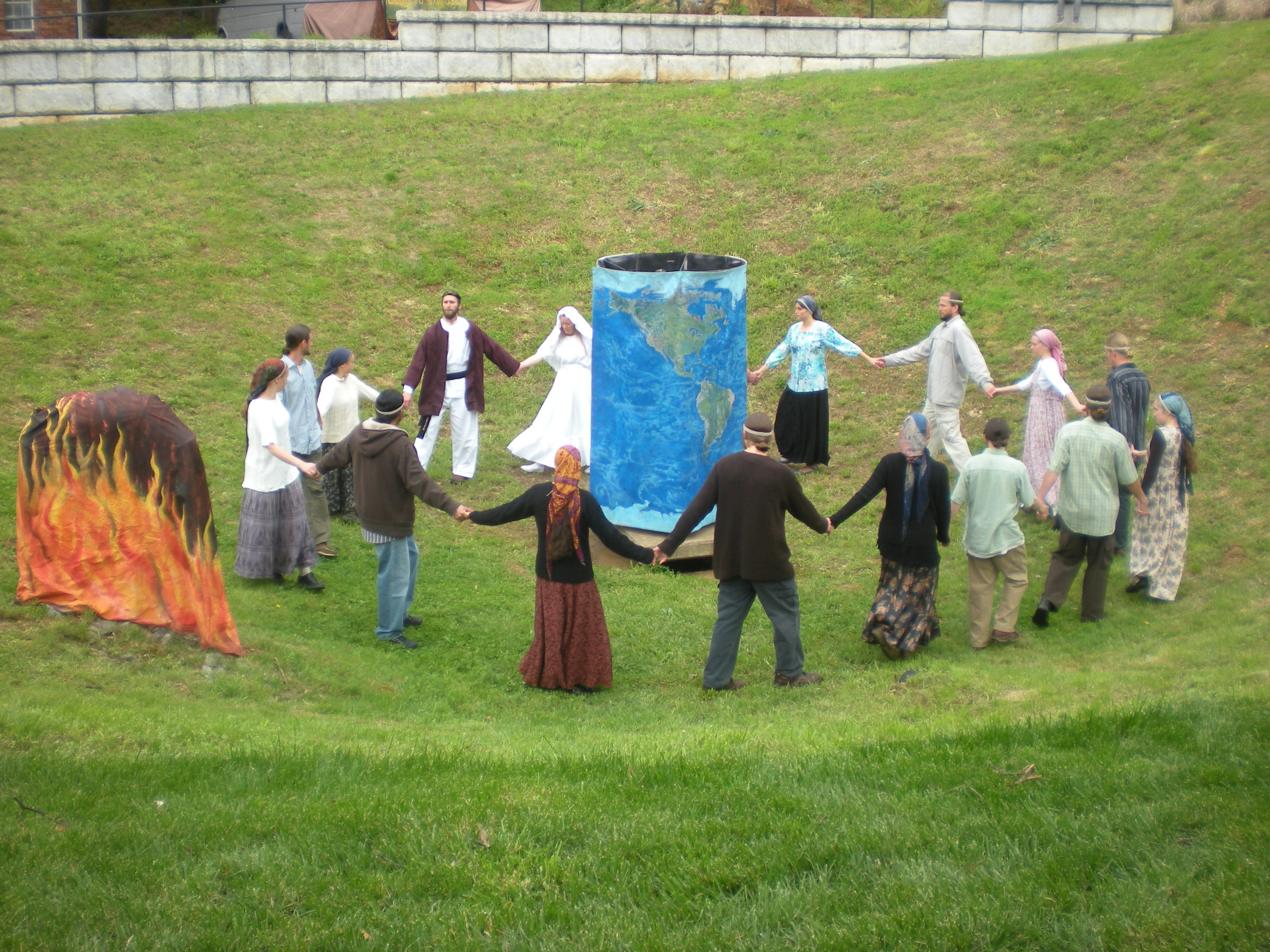
Twelve Tribes wedding (2009)

Courtship within the community involves a "waiting period" in which the man or woman expresses their desire to get to know another person. The potential couple then receives input from the community while spending time together. The couple is betrothed (engaged) if their parents (or the entire community, if they are adults) confirm their love and compatibility; the couple is then permitted to hold hands.

Weddings are dramatized pre-enactments of what the group believes will happen at the end of time when "Yahshua" returns to earth for his bride.

=== Children ===
Children, especially the sons, have been noted to play a central role in the group's eschatological beliefs. The Twelve Tribes believe that it is the parents' responsibility to properly enforce a consequence for sin (wrongful action, words, behavior) so as to allow the child to maintain the state of a clean conscience. Over time, the children's children will be better equipped to deal with or "overcome" the faults of their predecessors. This will enable future generations of the group to hopefully be the "144,000" of Revelation 7. Children are homeschooled. Within the group, children are apprenticed to elders by the age of 13 to be trained in "crafts and specialized labor".

The group practices corporal punishment of children with a "reed-like rod", like a balloon stick (a minimum), across the child's bottom, though many former members, including children raised in the group, say punishments can include severe beatings to the point of bleeding or collapse, and are often repeated daily. Corporal punishment could be theoretically meted out by any adult member of the group, even those not related to the family, but more recently the parents have been made primarily responsible for disciplining their own children.

=== Countercult movement ===
Bob Pardon, the executive director of Christian countercult movement New England Institute of Religious Research, has done extensive research on Twelve Tribes. According to a report from the Southern Poverty Law Center, Pardon first became aware of Twelve Tribes when a former member reported potential evidence of child abuse. Because he was initially skeptical, he was given access to the group to research it. He also received information on the group's teachings from high level former members. Pardon released his research and findings in a report that stated, "Messianic Communities, under the leadership of Spriggs, has tended towards an extreme authoritarianism" and a "Galatian heresy". By controlling information released or that members can access, groups like the Twelve Tribes greatly discourage people from reading anything "contrary to the group and does not have TVs, radios, newspapers or books," explains Pardon. "The person has essentially no access to outside information."

Since their inception roughly 25 years prior to the publication (around mid-1970s), they have found themselves the subject of scrutiny from the anti-cult movement, first in North America and later in Europe. In France, the group was listed on the 1995 Governmental Report by the Parliamentary Commission on Cults in France under the name "Ordre apostolique – Therapeutic healing environment."

Twelve Tribes members Jean Swantko and husband Ed Wiseman have made efforts to combat social stigma and the anti-cult movement by engaging in dialogue with the media and government authorities. Swantko, who also represents the group in legal matters, has presented at conferences including the Communal Studies Association and Society for the Scientific Study of Religion as well as a chapter in James T. Richardson's Regulating Religion: Case Studies from Around the Globe.

In contrast, NRM apologist Stuart A. Wright cites the Twelve Tribes as a group suffering from "front-end/back-end disproportionality" in media coverage. According to Wright, the media often focuses on unsubstantiated charges against the group, but as charges are investigated and as cases fall apart, the media covers them significantly less at the end than it does at the beginning. Wright then asserts that this leaves the public with the impression that the group was guilty of the disproven charges.

=== The Island Pond raid ===
On June 22, 1984, Vermont State Police arrived at the Twelve Tribes' Island Pond residences and took custody of hundreds of group members with their children, based on an investigation of accusations of child abuse. All cases were dismissed when a judge found that the search warrant was unconstitutional. Frank Mahady, the judge in the case, called the action a "grossly unlawful scheme", while Judge Wolchik, who had signed the initial search warrant, said that he was given "false or unreliable information".

The Vermont Chapter of the American Civil Liberties Union (ACLU) also criticized the raid, calling it "frightening" and "the greatest deprivation of civil liberties to have occurred in recent Vermont history." Richard Snelling, the governor of Vermont who had authorized the raid, reportedly drew the "hottest political fire of his career" in the weeks after; while Vermont Attorney General John J. Easton Jr. attributed the raid to assisting his campaign for governorship.

In 1992, John Burchard, who had been the State Commissioner of Social and Rehabilitation Services, and Vanessa L. Malcarne, published an article in Behavioral Sciences and the Law, encouraging changes in the law that would have allowed the raid to succeed. The group held anniversary events in both 1994 and 2000; and produced a 75-minute documentary.

=== Teachings about Jews ===
The group teaches the belief that Jews are collectively responsible for the death of Christ, quoting Matthew 27:25. They are often labelled antisemitic, although the group repeatedly denies this accusation. Twelve Tribes' members observe a Sabbath on Saturday, similar to Jews, as well as the Jewish festivals of Pesach, Yom Kippur, and Sukkot. Youth hold Bar Mitzvah and Bat Mitzvah celebrations, and they regularly perform Israeli folk dances.

=== Child labor and homeschooling ===
In 2001, The New York Post ran an article accusing the group of child labor violations; and later attributed itself as having prompted the investigation. The Twelve Tribes responded with a press conference at the Common Sense Farm where the alleged child labor had taken place. The Twelve Tribes reported that during a random inspection by Estée Lauder Companies, the company discovered that several 14-year-olds had been found assisting their fathers in the factory. This report was later confirmed by Estée Lauder who terminated their contract with Common Sense products. The group's official statement at the press conference stated that they believed that it was a family-owned business, and children ought to be able to help their parents in the business while making "no apology" for it. The New York State Department of Labor stated that they intended to visit all five of the Twelve Tribes' businesses. State Attorney General Eliot Spitzer said that apprenticeships amounted to indentured servitude and were illegal. Robert Redford's Sundance Catalog, who had contracted with Common Wealth Woodworks (another of the group's industries that made furniture), also terminated their contract as a response to the allegations. The Labor Department found no violations at Common Sense Farm or Commonwealth Woodworks. They did propose a fine on two other industries: $2,000 for allegations of child labor law violations that the group's spokesperson, Jean Swantko Wiseman, was quoted in a news article as saying were for a 15-year-old pushing a wheelbarrow and another 15-year-old changing a lightbulb.

In June 2018, another New York State investigation into the Common Sense Farm was launched, yielding allegations of child labor, after an Inside Edition hidden camera investigation revealed children working in the group's soap factory. The Twelve Tribes-owned business Greener Formulas had been contracted with brands including Acure and Savannah Bee to manufacture its private label body care products and was using the facilities of Common Sense Farm (also owned by the group) for production. Both Acure and Savannah Bee terminated their contracts with Greener Formulas following the airing of the Inside Edition story.

In Germany and France, the controversies centered on the issues of homeschooling, health, child abuse, and religious freedom. The group has several times been in conflict with authorities in Germany and France over child abuse and homeschooling, with a particularly long and protracted dispute between the community in Klosterzimmern, in the municipality of Deiningen, Bavaria, and Bavarian education authorities. Homeschooling is illegal in Germany, with rare exceptions. When fines and arrests failed to have an effect on the community, authorities granted the group the right to operate a private school on the commune's premises in 2011, under state supervision. The agreement entailed that the school would not teach sex education or evolution. Authorities revoked the school's right to operate in 2013, after it refused to answer to allegations of physical abuse and a lack of certified teaching staff.

=== Views on slavery ===
According to a 2018 report by the Southern Poverty Law Center, the Twelve Tribes teaches its followers the belief that the curse of Ham is a racial curse that made Ham a servant of his brother, Shem. This teaching is used to justify slavery. According to the group's stated teaching, slavery was "a marvelous opportunity that blacks could be brought over here to be slaves so that they could be found worthy of the nations". Nevertheless, there are Black members of the Twelve Tribes, which teaches the belief that "slavery is over for those who believe". The SPLC concludes that since the Twelve Tribes only consider themselves true believers, this belief does not apply to black persons who are outside the group.

=== Departure from Germany ===
On September 5, 2013, German police raided two communities belonging to the Twelve Tribes and removed 40 children to protect them from continued abuse. The raid was prompted by undercover reporting by Wolfram Kuhnigk, who secretly recorded how the sect beat their children. The group admits that they use a "reed-like rod" for discipline but denies abusing their children. In 2018, the European Court of Human Rights upheld the German move to take away the children from the sect:

In [the Wetjen v. Germany case], the parents believed, based upon their religion, that they had the obligation to cane their children under the age of 12 when they were disobedient. The Court distinguished the right granted to parents to pass on their religious and philosophical beliefs from the Wetjen's actions stating that, "[w]hile the Court has accepted that this [the passing on of moral convictions] might even occur in an insistent and overbearing manner, it has stressed that it may not expose children to dangerous practices or to physical or psychological harm."

Some children were returned to their parents and some were not. The Twelve Tribes left Germany for the Czech Republic in 2017.

=== Killing of Darren Cody Gambrel ===
In November 2024, Darren Cody Gambrel, a member of the 12 Tribes, was found stabbed to death at the 12 Tribes community in Pulaski, Tennessee. Adam Arthur Rosenthal, who had joined the Twelve Tribes five to six months earlier, confessed to police of killing Gambrel to prove to God his faith.

=== Other issues ===
In 2018, the group was showcased on the Vice HD channel in the United States on an episode of their Cults and Extreme Belief series, as former member Samie Brosseau accused the group of abusive practices.

In July 2019, the American Federal Bureau of Investigation (FBI) released a 40-page summary of the results of a closed preliminary investigation stemming from allegations of child abuse at the group's Hiddenite, North Carolina, property. The documents revealed the existence of other investigations over the years to include suspicions of child abuse in other compounds. There were also deaths alleged to be suspicious.

In January 2020, Scott "Chen" Czarnecki, a former elder who helped establish the 12 Tribes in Australia, gave an interview detailing his reasons for leaving the Tribes to Australia's A Current Affair. Czarnecki said he knew of babies that had been born stillborn. In February 2020, police in New South Wales, Australia, executed a search warrant on the group's Peppercorn Creek Farm property, seizing documents and other evidence in what has been a prolonged investigation into allegations of child abuse in the group. In March 2020, police returned for a more extensive search operation for stillborn babies buried on the property—Czarnecki had leveled accusations that the group buried babies on their property— at Peppercorn Creek Farm and another of the group's properties. At least one infant was found at the farm. In September 2020, NSW police announced in a statement they anticipated a close of the investigation late 2020 or early 2021. No official closure or criminal charges has been announced as of October 2021. In August 2020, Scott "Chen" Czarnecki was found dead with penetrating wounds in his New South Wales home. A 17-year-old boy was charged with his murder.

== Businesses ==
The Twelve Tribes supports itself through means that allow its members to work together, without the need to seek outside employment. Businesses the group owns and operates include:

- Parchment Press: A printing company offering printing services and also printing and selling the group's literature.
- BOJ Construction: A general contractor based in Plymouth, Massachusetts and operating nationally, using unpaid and child labor.
- Commonwealth Construction: Construction contracting, primarily in the Southeastern U.S.
- Greener Formulas: A soap and body care research and development firm with ties to its other business, Common Sense Farm.
- Maté Factor: A yerba mate import company that also runs two cafés, in Manitou Springs, Colorado, and Savannah, Georgia.

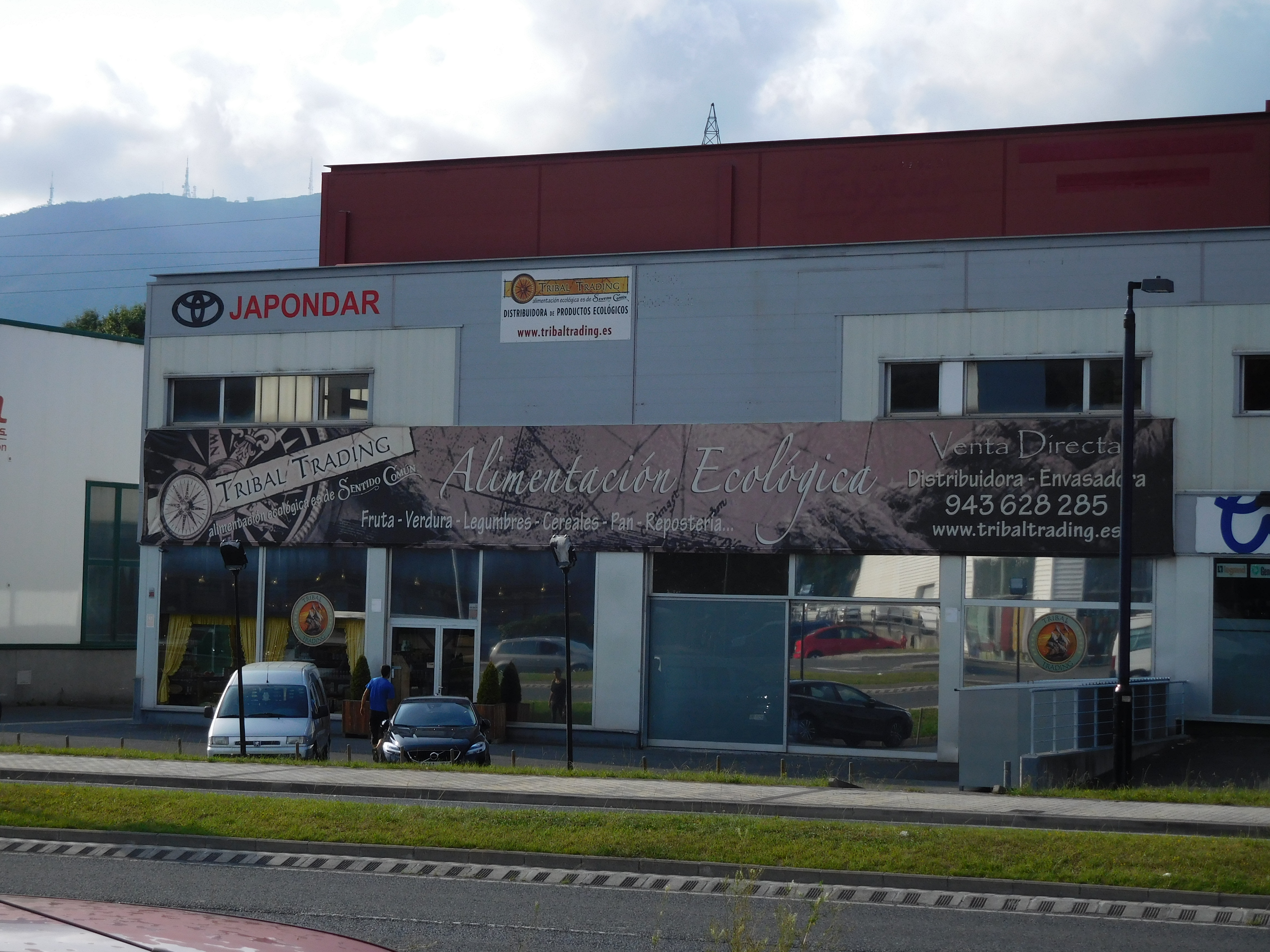
Tribal Trading store in Irun, Spain (permanently closed as of 2026)

- Tribal Trading: an organic foods distribution company based in Irún, Spain.
- A farm in Kansas.
- A construction business in Colorado. For that particular community, construction using unpaid labor is their main source of income.
- Stoneybrook Farm Market in Hillsboro, Virginia. A restaurant, bakery, and market located on a 45-acre farm close to the border of West Virginia.

The group also runs restaurant chains:

- Yellow Deli Restaurants
- Common Ground Café Restaurants

== Outreach ==
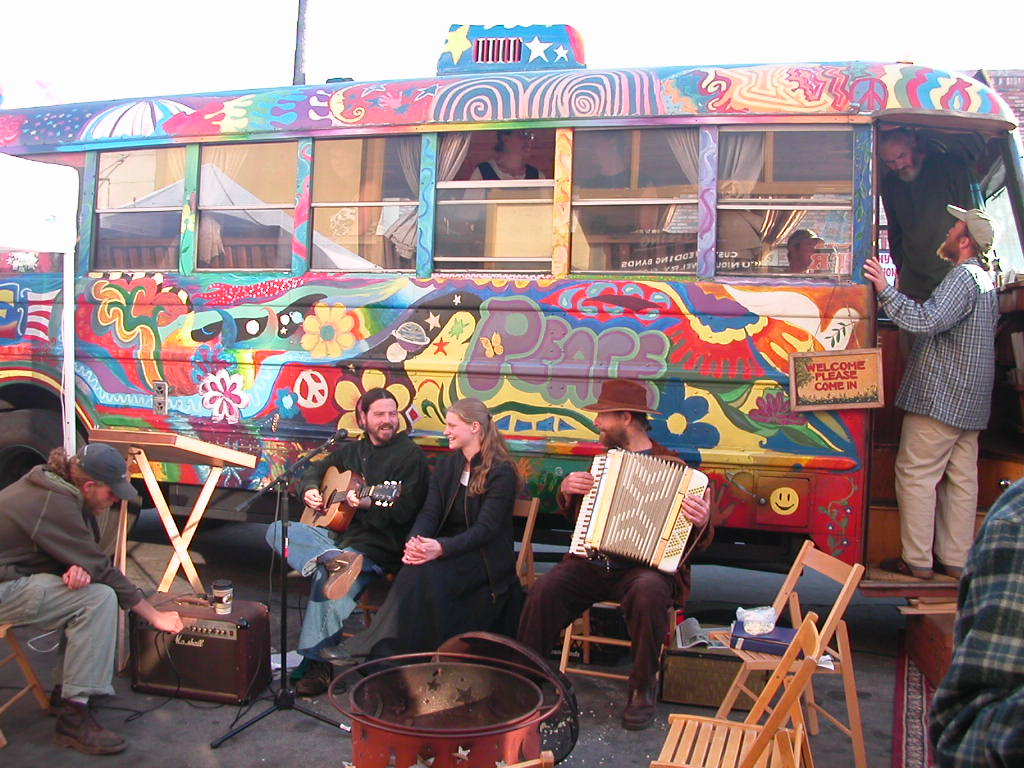
A Twelve Tribes 'Hippie bus' (2007)

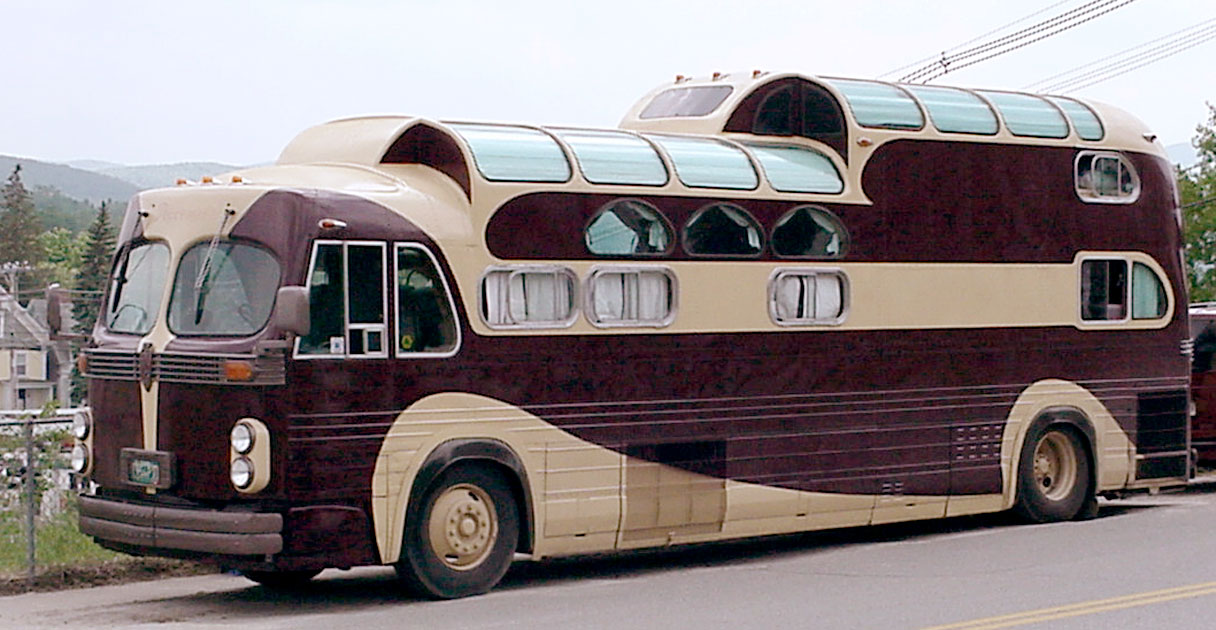
Peacemaker 1 bus (1984)

The Twelve Tribes evangelistic methods have been described as "unobtrusive". The Twelve Tribes uses mobile operations and vehicles to evangelize at various events:

- Peacemaker Marine: A Class-A barquentine sailing ship bought and restored by the group sailing on the Eastern coast of the United States. The group now gives tours and evangelizes at ports.
- Peacemaker I & II Buses: A custom PD-4501 Scenicruiser with added floor from the roof of an Aerocoach

The Tribes also sends out members on missionary excursions. The first missionaries, or "walkers" relied on the goodwill of strangers and evangelized to anyone who would offer them a ride, water or a place to stay. According to a member, "We would go into town looking for people who loved God with all their hearts. Our backpacks got smaller as we realized people were really going to take us in. There are quite a few people in our community who we first met through Walkers." The group passes out tracts called "freepapers" inviting guests to visit or even stay with the group. Other events explicitly aimed at the public, such as Friday night celebrations and weddings, draw interested persons.

== Locations ==
Locations as of 2025:

Tribe of Benyamin (Southeastern U.S.)

- Arcadia, Florida
- Asheville, North Carolina (Gladheart Farm)
- Brunswick, Georgia
- Chattanooga, Tennessee
- Hillsboro, Virginia (Stoneybrook Farm)
- Pine Island, Florida (Gatherings Grove Farm)
- Pulaski, Tennessee
- Savannah, Georgia
- Mobile, Alabama

Tribe of Yehuda (Northeastern U.S.)

- Bellows Falls, Vermont (Basin Farm)
- Cambridge, New York (Common Sense Farm)
- Coxsackie, New York
- Hamburg, New York
- Hyannis, Massachusetts
- Island Pond, Vermont
- Ithaca, New York
- Lancaster, New Hampshire
- Oak Hill, New York
- Oneonta, New York
- Milton, Massachusetts
- Plymouth, Massachusetts
- Rutland, Vermont

Tribe of Manasseh (Midwest and Colorado)

- Boulder, Colorado
- Overbrook, Kansas (Fieldstone Orchard)
- Lawrence, Kansas
- Manitou Springs, Colorado
- Warsaw, Missouri

Tribe of Yowceph (Western U.S.)

- Valley Center, California (Morning Star Ranch)
- Raymond, Washington
- Vista, California
- Egegik, Alaska (fishing outpost)

Tribe of Gad (Canada)

- Chilliwack, British Columbia (Fairfield Farm)
- Courtenay, British Columbia (New Sprout Farm)
- Kingston, Ontario (Abbey Dawn Farm)
- Nelson, British Columbia (Mount Sentinel Village Farm)
- Winnipeg, Manitoba (Little Mountain Farm)

Tribe of Asher

- Katoomba, New South Wales, Australia
- Kyoto, Japan

Tribe of Issachar (Argentina)

- General Rodriguez
- Sierra de los Padres

Tribe of Shimon (Spain)

- Corella
- San Sebastián
- Orio
- Pedreguer

Tribe of Levi (Eastern Europe)

- Mšecké Žehrovice, Czech Republic
- Skalná, Czech Republic
- Hvězdlice, Czech Republic
- Cluj-Napoca, Romania

Tribe of Naphtali (Brazil)

- Campo Largo (Sítio Vale do Rio Verde)
- General Carneiro
- Itapecerica da Serra
- Londrina (Farm in Londrina)

Tribe of Zebulun

- Honiton (Stentwood Farm)
