= Thirtle =

Thirtle is a surname. Notable people with the surname include:

- James William Thirtle, UK-born magazine editor
- John Thirtle (1777–1839), English watercolour artist and frame maker
