= SSBE =

SSBE may refer to:

- Sacred Scriptures Bethel Edition
- Standard Southern British English
