= Mark A. Lamport =

American professor

- Born: November 23, 1955
- Education: Doctor of Philosophy, Master of Theology, Master of Divinity, Master of Arts
- Alma mater: Michigan State University
- Occupation: Religious studies scholar, university teacher, theologian, editor
- Awards: Booklist Editors' Choice (2015)

Mark A. Lamport (born November 23, 1955) is an author, editor, and academic. For forty years, he has been a professor of practical theology at graduate schools in the United States and Europe. He is the editor of the Encyclopedia of Christian Education which was the award winner of the Booklist Editors' Choice: Adult Books, 2016, and the author of over 200 publications. He is coeditor of Encyclopedia of Christianity and the Global South, Encyclopedia of Martin Luther and the Reformation, Encyclopedia of Christianity in the United States and the Encyclopedia of Christian Education.

== Life ==
=== Education ===
Lamport holds a Ph.D. from the Michigan State University, a Th.M. from the Princeton Theological Seminary, a M.Div from the Evangelical Theological Seminary, a M.A. from the Wheaton College Graduate School, and a B.A. from Huntingdon College.

=== Teaching ===
He has been a professor at graduate schools in Arizona, California, Colorado, Indiana, Virginia, Belgium, England, Portugal, Wales and the Netherlands. He also has been a lecturer at academic institutions in Africa, Asia, Australia, and Europe.

== Selected works ==
- Kurian, George Thomas; Lamport, Mark A., eds. (2015). Encyclopedia of Christian education. Lanham, Maryland: Rowman & Littlefield. ISBN 9780810884939. OCLC 908763127.
- Kurian, George Thomas; Lamport, Mark A., eds. (2016). The encyclopedia of Christianity in the United States. Lanham, Maryland: Rowman & Littlefield. ISBN 9781442244320. OCLC 954134417.
- Lamport, Mark A.; Marty, Martin E., eds. (2017). Encyclopedia of Martin Luther and the Reformation. Lanham, Maryland: Rowman & Littlefield. ISBN 9781442271593. OCLC 983786463.
- Lamport, Mark A., ed. (2018). Encyclopedia of Christianity in the Global South. Lanham, Maryland: Rowman & Littlefield. ISBN 9781442271562. OCLC 1005687259.
- Lamport, Mark A., Forrest, Benjamin K., and Whaley, Vernon, eds. (2019) Hymns and Hymnody: Historical and Theological Introductions. Eugene, OR: Cascade. ISBN 978-1-4982-9982-4
- Edie, Fred P. and Lamport, Mark A. (2021) Nurturing Faith: a Practical Theology for Educating Christians. Grand Rapids: Eerdmans. ISBN 978-0-8028-7556-3.
- Lamport, Mark A., ed. (2022) The Rowman & Littlefield handbook of philosophy and religion. Lanham, MD: Rowman & LIttlefield. ISBN 978-1-5381-4127-4
- Barreto, Raimundo and Lamport, Mark A. (2023) Engaging Coloniality: The Liberative Story of Christianity in Latin America. Eugene, OR:Cascade Books. ISBN 978-1-6667-2098-3
- Yong, Amos; Lamport, Mark A.; Lim, Timothy T. N., eds. (2023). Uncovering the Pearl: The Hidden Story of Christianity in Asia. The Global Story of Christianity. Vol. 2. Wipf and Stock Publishers. ISBN 9781666720884.
