= Encyclopedia of Christianity in the United States =

Five-volume encyclopedia by Rowman and Littlefield

- Editors: George Thomas Kurian and Mark A. Lamport
- Subject: history of Christianity
- Published: 2017
- Publisher: Rowman and Littlefield
- ISBN: 978-1-4422-4432-0

The Encyclopedia of Christianity in the United States is a five-volume encyclopedia published by Rowman & Littlefield in 2017 and edited by George Thomas Kurian and Mark A. Lamport. The work is a comprehensive reference work about the history of Christianity in the United States.

The Encyclopedia of Christianity in the United States has received favorable comments from Robert Wuthnow, Leigh E. Schmidt and Edward C. Mallinckrodt, Gary Laderman and Goodrich C. White, Laurie Maffly-Kipp and John C. Danforth, Anglican & Episcopal History, George Marsden, Christianity Today, Booklist, and Library Journal.

The Encyclopedia of Christianity in the United States was selected one of the Notable Books of 2016.
