= Joseph Bryant Rotherham =

British biblical scholar

Joseph Bryant Rotherham (1828–1910) was an English biblical scholar and minister of the Churches of Christ. He was a prolific writer whose best-known work was the Emphasized Bible, a new translation that used "emphatic inversion" and a set of diacritical marks to bring out shades of meaning in the original text.

== Life ==
Rotherham was born at New Buckenham, Norfolk in the United Kingdom. His father was a Methodist preacher, and Rotherham followed in his footsteps, pastoring churches in Woolwich, Charlton and Stockton-on-Tees. However he soon developed differences with Methodism regarding infant baptism and, at the same time, became interested in the writings of the American preacher Alexander Campbell, one of the early leaders of the Restoration Movement. Rotherham eventually joined the movement in 1854 and became a well-known evangelist and biblical scholar with the Churches of Christ.

During the 1860s Rotherham began work on a translation of the Bible in which he tried:

To do all in [his] power towards placing the reader of the present time in as good a position as that occupied by the reader of the first century for understanding the Apostolic Writings.

This he proposed to do by giving "special heed to the Greek Article, to the Tenses, and to the Logical Idiom of the Original."

In 1872 his New Testament Critically Emphasised was published, with the Old Testament appearing in 1902. During this interval great advances occurred in textual criticism culminating at the end of the 19th century with Brooke Foss Westcott's and Fenton John Anthony Hort's Greek text of the New Testament. This led Rotherham to revise his New Testament twice to stay abreast of scholarly developments. He based his Old Testament translation on the comprehensive Hebrew text of Dr. C. D Ginsburg, which anticipated readings now widely accepted.

Rotherham became an editor with James Sangster and Co., London in 1868, and then a Press Corrector for 31 years beginning in 1874, principally working with religious books. Although this effectively ended his Evangelistic work, he continued preaching and publishing articles in such magazines as Christian Commonwealth and Public Opinion, focusing particularly on scholarly issues such as the translation of the Revised Version. From 1885 to 1887 he was also editor of The Rainbow, a monthly magazine of Christian literature. Rotherham was a friend of several prominent Christian leaders of his day, including G. Campbell Morgan and C.H. Spurgeon.

== Death ==
Rotherham enjoyed good health virtually to the end of his life, giving his last sermon on December 19, 1909. However, on New Year's Day 1910 he caught a severe cold and experienced a rapid decline, dying only a few days later at the age of 81. His body was laid to rest in Hither Green Cemetery on January 10, with an evening service, including an address given by the Old Testament scholar J. W. Thirtle.

== Works ==
- (1902) The Emphasized Bible
- (1906, revised 1922) Reminiscences Extending Over a Period of More Than Seventy Years, 1828-1906
- (1906) Studies in the Epistle to the Hebrews
- Christian Ministry After the Primitive Ideal
- Our Sacred Books: Short Chapters on Inspiration, Transmission, and Translation
- The Authority of the Bible: Shown by the Conclusive Argument Derived From Unity in Diversity
- (1911) Studies in the Psalms
- (1911) Let Us Keep the Feast: Being Plain Chapters on the Lord's Supper (Mr. Rotherham's last book)
