= Assemblies of Yahweh =

Religious denomination headquartered in Bethel, Pennsylvania, United States

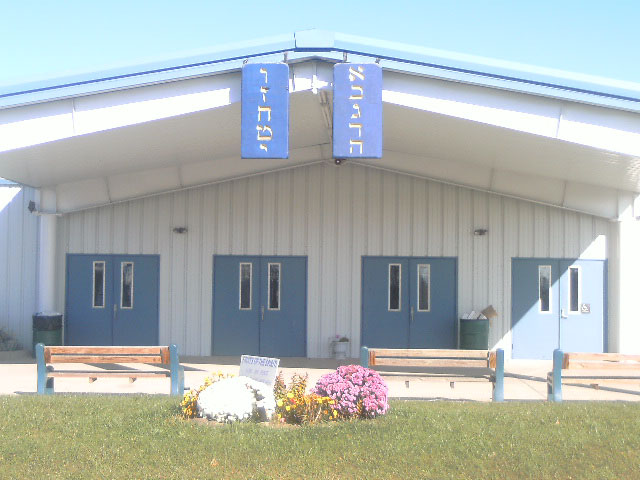
- Assemblies of Yahweh headquarters in Bethel, Pennsylvania
- Scripture: Sacred Scriptures Bethel Edition
- Founder: Jacob O. Meyer
- Origin: 1969; Bethel, Berks County, Pennsylvania
- Official website: https://assembliesofyahweh.com/

The Assemblies of Yahweh is a nonprofit religious organization founded by Jacob O. Meyer in 1969. Its international headquarters are in Bethel, Pennsylvania. The organization developed from a radio ministry begun by Meyer in 1966. The Assemblies of Yahweh is part of the Sacred Name movement, a collective term for organizations which use the Hebrew names of God and Jesus, such as Yahweh and Yahshua.

== History ==
Founder Jacob O. Meyer grew up in the Church of the Brethren, but left that church in the 1950s, later attending an independent Sacred Name assembly meeting in Hamburg, Pennsylvania, and attending seminaries in Idaho and Oregon. While in Idaho he worked as an assistant editor of the Sacred Name Herald. He returned to Bethel in 1964. In 1966, he began a radio ministry, The Sacred Name Broadcaster, which broadcast from station in Baltimore. Meyer began his own magazine, the Sacred Name Broadcaster, in 1968. The Assemblies of Yahweh were founded in 1969, and ten elders were ordained. A second magazine exclusively for members of the Assemblies, the Narrow Way, began publishing in 1969. The Assemblies of Yahweh's Statement of Doctrine states the organization was founded to provide "a framework of the sound doctrines that are contained in the inspired Scriptures" among the Sacred Name movement.

In 1980, former elders of the Assemblies of Yahweh in Kansas formed a new organization called the Assemblies of Yahweh in Messiah. The members who left the Assemblies of Yahweh did so over administrative rather than doctrinal issues. In 1985, the new group was renamed Yahweh's Assembly in Messiah after a trademark infringement lawsuit.

== Beliefs ==
In 1969 the Assemblies of Yahweh received its charter from Berks County, Pennsylvania. The core of this charter reads:

Our purpose is to teach and preach the word and sacred Name of our Heavenly Father and the truth of the inspired scriptures, to promote the interest of religion and the spread of spiritual holiness throughout the world.

— Assemblies of Yahweh mission statement

The Assemblies of Yahweh believe it is necessary for believers to use the names Yahweh and Yahshua for God and Jesus. The Assemblies of Yahweh states that the Old Testament is the basis of its faith, following all Old Testament commandments except for those regarding ritual and annual animal sacrifice, and keeping the seventh-day Sabbath. The Assemblies of Yahweh are nontrinitarian, stating that they find the Trinity to be "foreign to the inspired Scriptures".

The Assemblies of Yahweh consider their faith to be somewhere between Christianity and Judaism, and refers to members as Messianic Israelites, or True Worshippers. Men in the Assemblies of Yahweh wear beards, and women wear modest dress and cover their heads for worship. The Assemblies of Yahweh practices tithing, nonviolence and conscientious objection to war.

== Organizational structure ==
The Assemblies of Yahweh is headed by a directing elder. The ordained preaching elders serve in spiritual matters, and deacons handle temporal affairs, who are always male. Missionaries and senior missionaries maybe male or female.

== Education ==
The Assemblies of Yahweh has operates educational institutions located in Bethel, Pennsylvania, Obadiah School of the Bible and Dalet School.

== Sacred Scriptures Bethel Edition ==
The Assemblies of Yahweh publishes its own Bible translation, the Sacred Scriptures Bethel Edition.

== WMLK ==
WMLK
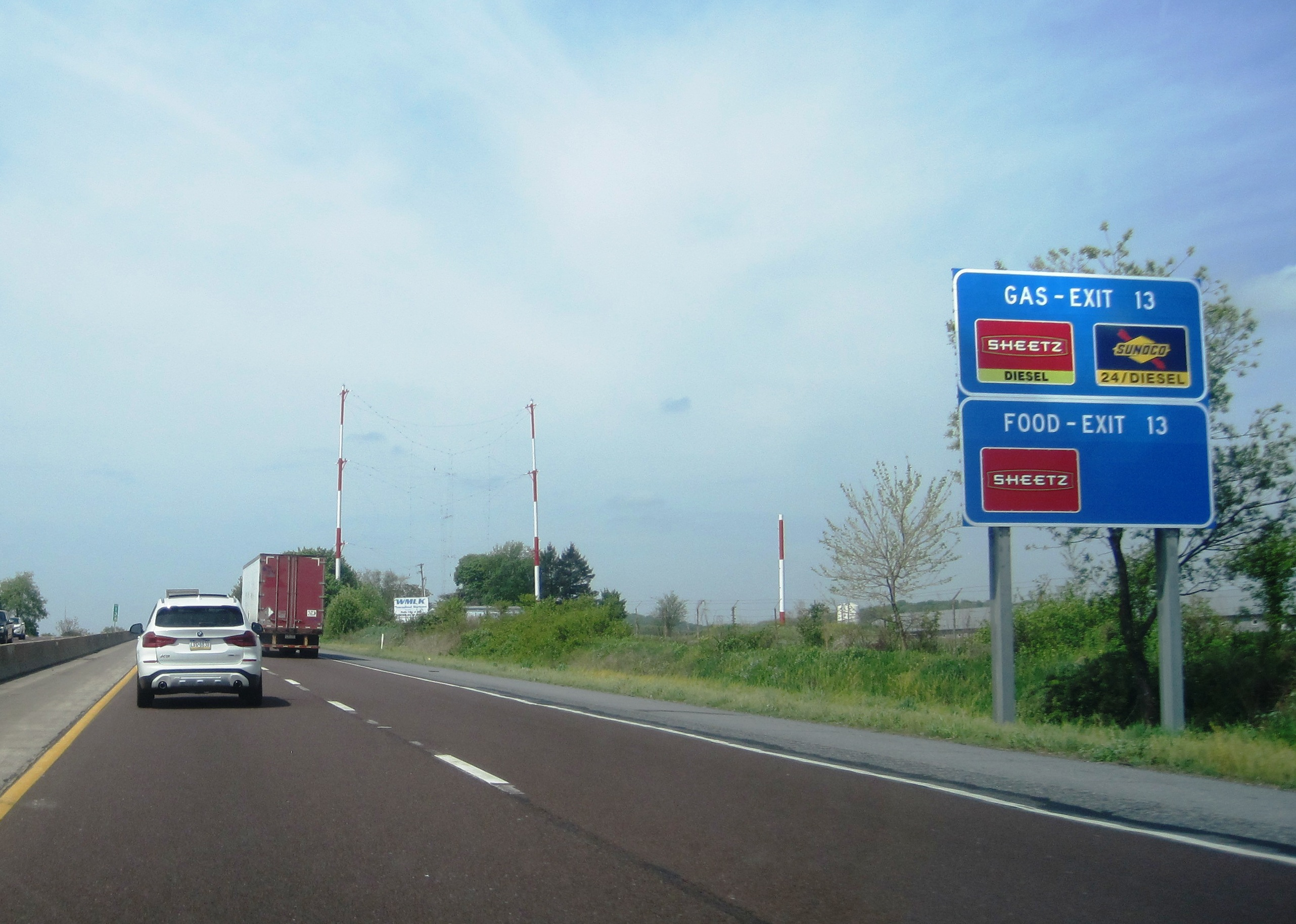
- Transmitter and information sign along westbound I-78/US 22
- Bethel, Berks County, Pennsylvania; United States
- Frequencies: 9.275 MHz; 15.15 MHz; 17.525 MHz

Ownership
- Owner: Assemblies of Yahweh

History
- First air date: 1981
- Call sign meaning: From the Hebrew word malak (“messenger”)

Technical information
- Power: 300 kW

Links
- Website: www.wmlkradio.net

WMLK is a shortwave radio station licensed to Bethel, Pennsylvania, United States, and owned by the Assemblies of Yahweh. The station broadcasts internationally on 9.275 MHz, 15.15 MHz, and 17.525 MHz. Its call sign is derived from the Hebrew word malak (מַלְאָךְ), meaning “messenger.”

The station’s origins date to 1966, when Elder Jacob O. Meyer began a radio ministry known as the Sacred Name Broadcast. In 1981, the Assemblies of Yahweh acquired a 50,000-watt transmitter for shortwave use. The installation and technical adaptation of the transmitter were carried out by members of the Assemblies of Yahweh, including Deacon Gary McAvin, who served as chief engineer and oversaw aspects of the station’s technical development for several decades.

WMLK began shortwave broadcasting in 1985 using a modified RCA BTA-50G transmitter originally manufactured in 1947. In 2017, the station acquired a new transmitter manufactured by Ampegon, rated at up to 450 kW. Installation required updated cooling and power systems. Broadcasting resumed in June 2022 following completion of the upgrade. WMLK broadcasts recorded teachings by Jacob O. Meyer. Programming consists primarily of archived material.

WMLK’s curtain antenna system was featured in ARRL's Small Antennas for Small Spaces (2011), which included a photograph and description of the station’s antenna installation near Interstate 78 in Pennsylvania.

== See also ==
- Sacred Name movement
- Sacred Scriptures Bethel Edition
- Jacob O. Meyer
