= Emphasized Bible =

Translation of the Bible by Joseph Bryant Rotherham

Emphasized Bible, Rotherham
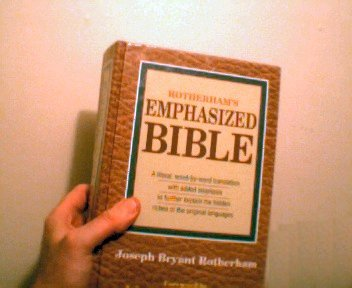
- Full name: Rotherham's Emphasized Bible
- Abbreviation: EBR
- Complete Bible published: 1902
- Textual basis: Westcott and Hort, 1892 revision (NT)
- Copyright: Public Domain
- Genesis 1:1–3 In the beginning God created the heavens and the earth. Now the earth had become waste and wild, and darkness was on the face of the roaring deep, – but the Spirit of God was brooding on the face of the waters. And God said – Light, be. And light was. John 3:16 For God so loved the world that his Only Begotten Son he gave – that whosoever believeth on him might not perish but have life age-abiding.

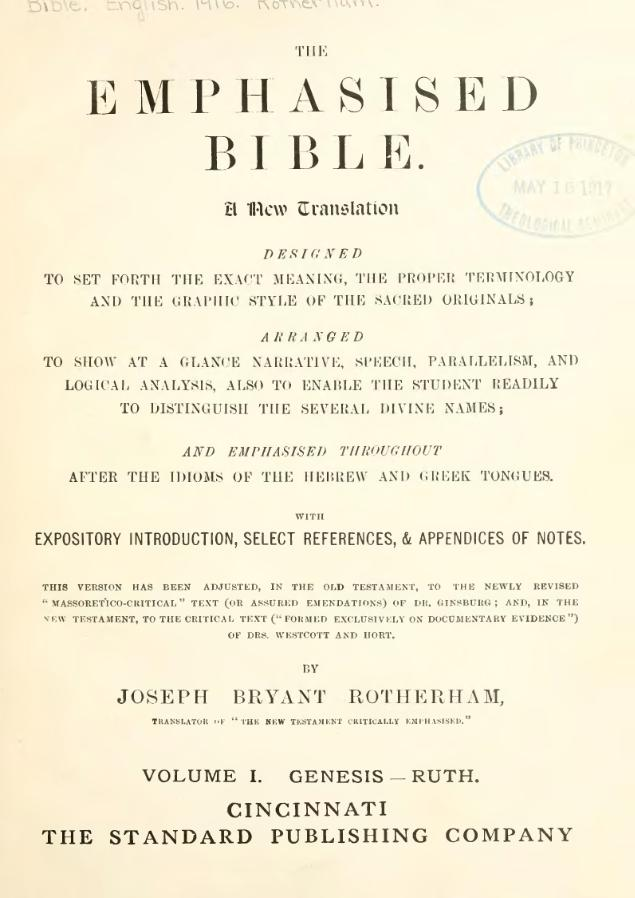
The Emphasised Bible - Vol 1

Joseph Bryant Rotherham's Emphasized Bible (abbreviated EBR to avoid confusion with the REB) is a translation of the Bible which uses various methods, such as "emphatic idiom" and special diacritical marks, to bring out nuances of the underlying Greek, Hebrew, and Aramaic texts. Rotherham was a Bible scholar and minister of the Churches of Christ, who described his goal as "placing the reader of the present time in as good a position as that occupied by the reader of the first century for understanding the Apostolic Writings".

The New Testament Critically Emphasised was first published in 1872. However, great changes occurred in textual criticism during the second half of the 19th century, culminating in Brooke Foss Westcott's and Fenton John Anthony Hort's Greek text of the New Testament. This led Rotherham to revise his New Testament twice, in 1878 and 1897, to stay abreast of scholarly developments.

The entire Bible with the Old Testament appeared in 1902. Rotherham based his Old Testament translation on Dr. C.D. Ginsburg's comprehensive Masoretico-critical edition of the Hebrew Bible, which anticipated readings now widely accepted.

Rotherham's translation has stayed in print over the years because of the wealth of information it presents. John R Kohlenberger III says in his preface to the 1994 printing, "The Emphasized Bible is one of the most innovative and thoroughly researched translations ever done by a single individual. Its presentation of emphases and grammatical features of the original languages still reward careful study."
