= James William Thirtle =

James William Thirtle (1854 – December 5, 1934, in Stratford, London), LLD, DD, Member of the Royal Asiatic Society, was editor of The Christian, 1887–1934.

J. W. Thirtle's father was converted to the Christadelphian faith while Thirtle was a child, and Thirtle himself was baptised in 1875. In 1881, he published in The Christadelphian magazine a defence of two of the later works of John Thomas, Eureka and Phanerosis.

In 1887 or 1888, Thirtle became editor of The Christian magazine.

In 1904, he received the honorary degree of Master of Arts and Divinity from Westminster College in Missouri. Also in 1904, he published the work for which he is chiefly remembered, concerning the titles of the Psalms. His research in this work was endorsed in 1908 by his senior colleague, E. W. Bullinger.

In 1904, Thirtle advertised for sale in The Christian the personal library of the late Charles Spurgeon, consisting of 12,000 volumes. In 1905, while the Baptist World Congress was being held in London, Thirtle arranged the sale of the core of the library, about 7,000 books, to William Jewell College in Liberty, Missouri.

Thirtle was a friend of J. B. Rotherham and gave the address at his funeral in 1910.

When he died he was still editor of The Christian.

== Works ==
- 1904 Titles of the Psalms
- 1907 Old Testament Problems
- ND In the Name: The Warrant of Prayer (London: Alfred Holness, ND)
- 1915 The Lord's Prayer: An Interpretation Critical and Expository (London: Morgan and Scott, 1915)

Selected articles:

- 1910 "A Sabbatarian Pioneer — Dr. Peter Chamberlen", Transactions of the Baptist Historical Society, 1910.
