= Sacred Scriptures Bethel Edition =

Sacred Name Bible

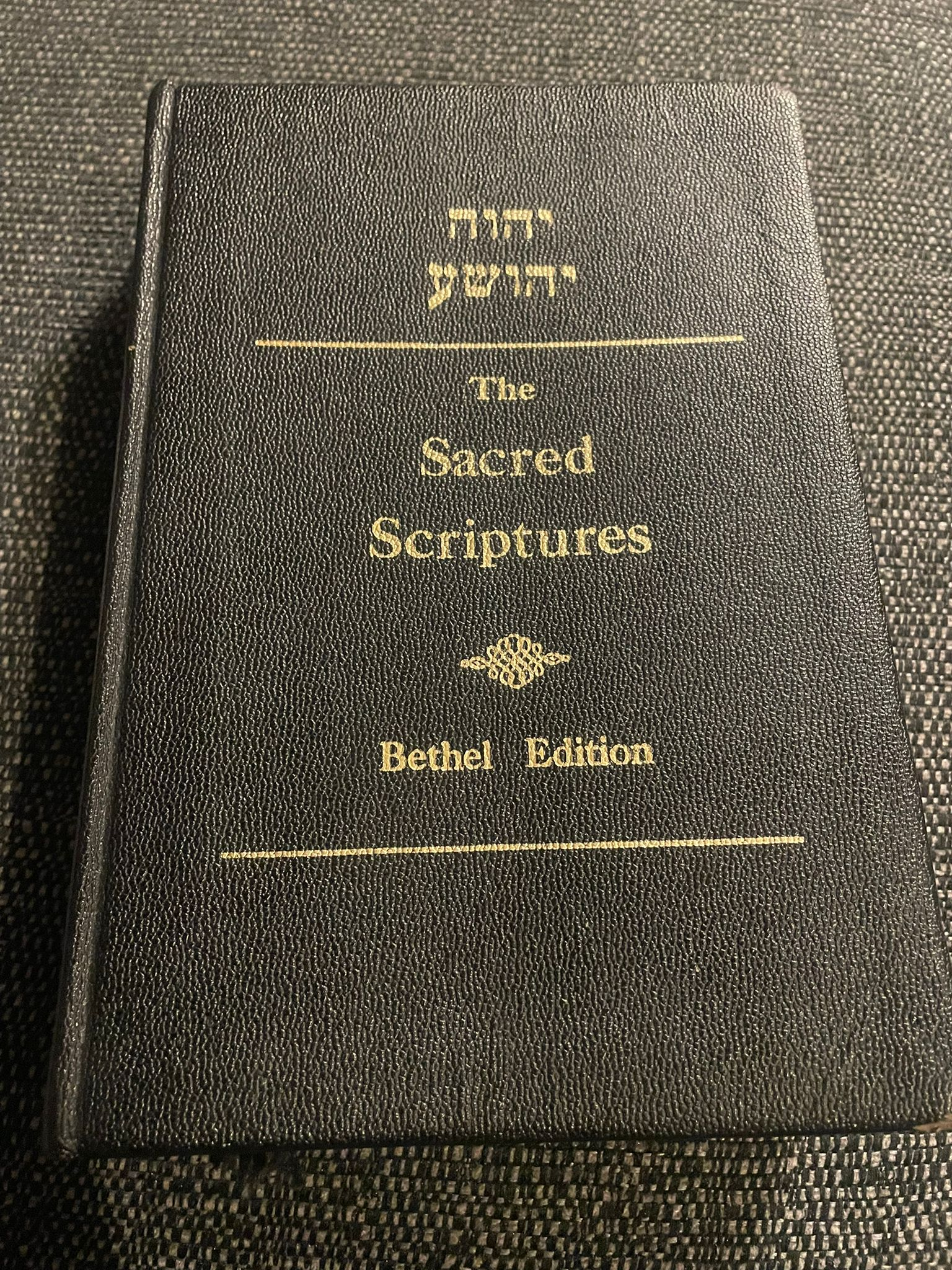
- Photograph of a Sacred Scriptures Bethel Edition (front)
- Abbreviation: SSBE
- OT published: 1981
- NT published: 1981
- Derived from: English Revised Version 1881–1885
- Textual basis: NT: Westcott and Hort 1881 and Tregelles 1857, (Reproduced in a single, continuous, form in Palmer 1881). OT: Masoretic Text with some Septuagint influence).
- Translation type: Formal equivalence
- Reading level: High school
- Copyright: 1981
- Religious affiliation: Assemblies of Yahweh
- Genesis 1:1–3 In the beginning Elohim created the heavens and the earth. And the earth had become waste and void; and darkness was upon the face of the deep: and the Spirit of Elohim moved upon the face of the waters. And Elohim said, Let there be light: and there was light. John 3:16 For Yahweh so loved the world, that he gave his only begotten Son, that whoever believes on him should not perish, but have eternal life.

The Sacred Scriptures Bethel Edition (SSBE) is an English-language Sacred Name Bible translation that uses the personal names Yahweh and Yahshua throughout both the Old and New Testaments. It was produced under the direction of Jacob O. Meyer, founding and directing Elder of the Assemblies of Yahweh, and first published in 1981.

The translation is based primarily upon the American Standard Version of 1901. The Sacred Scriptures Bethel Edition contains approximately 977 pages and was initially printed in an edition of 5,500 copies.

== History ==
In the early years of his ministry, Jacob O. Meyer commonly preached from the King James Version, verbally substituting “Yahweh” for “Lord” and “Yahshua” for “Jesus.” Over time, Meyer expressed concern that widely used English translations obscured essential elements of the original Hebrew and Greek texts, particularly the personal names for both Jesus and God the Father.

Throughout this time, Elder Meyer longed for the opportunity to produce a scholarly version of the Bible, with correct use of the Sacred Names and with translation errors corrected to give a good representation of the historically accepted Hebrew and Greek base texts.

— Sacred Name Broadcaster, January 2012, p.14

As Meyer studied Hebrew, Greek, and the original manuscripts, he concluded that many doctrinal misunderstandings originated not from the inspired texts themselves, but from later translation traditions and theological conventions. For this reason, he selected the American Standard Version as the primary English base text, citing its reputation among scholars as one of the most literal and textually faithful English translations available.

In the SSBE, terms considered inconsistent with the underlying Hebrew and Greek were changed. For example, references to the Messiah’s execution avoid the term “cross,” instead using “stake” or “pole,” reflecting the Greek terms stauros and xylon.

Funding was raised through international donations, supplemented by a bank loan. Editing and review were conducted manually throughout 1981, prior to the widespread use of personal computers, with assistance from Assemblies of Yahweh staff and students of the Obadiah School of the Bible. The names Yahsua and Yahweh were used throughout the text, along with Hebrew titles such as Elohim, Eloah, and El. Shakespearean English forms were updated to reflect twentieth-century usage.

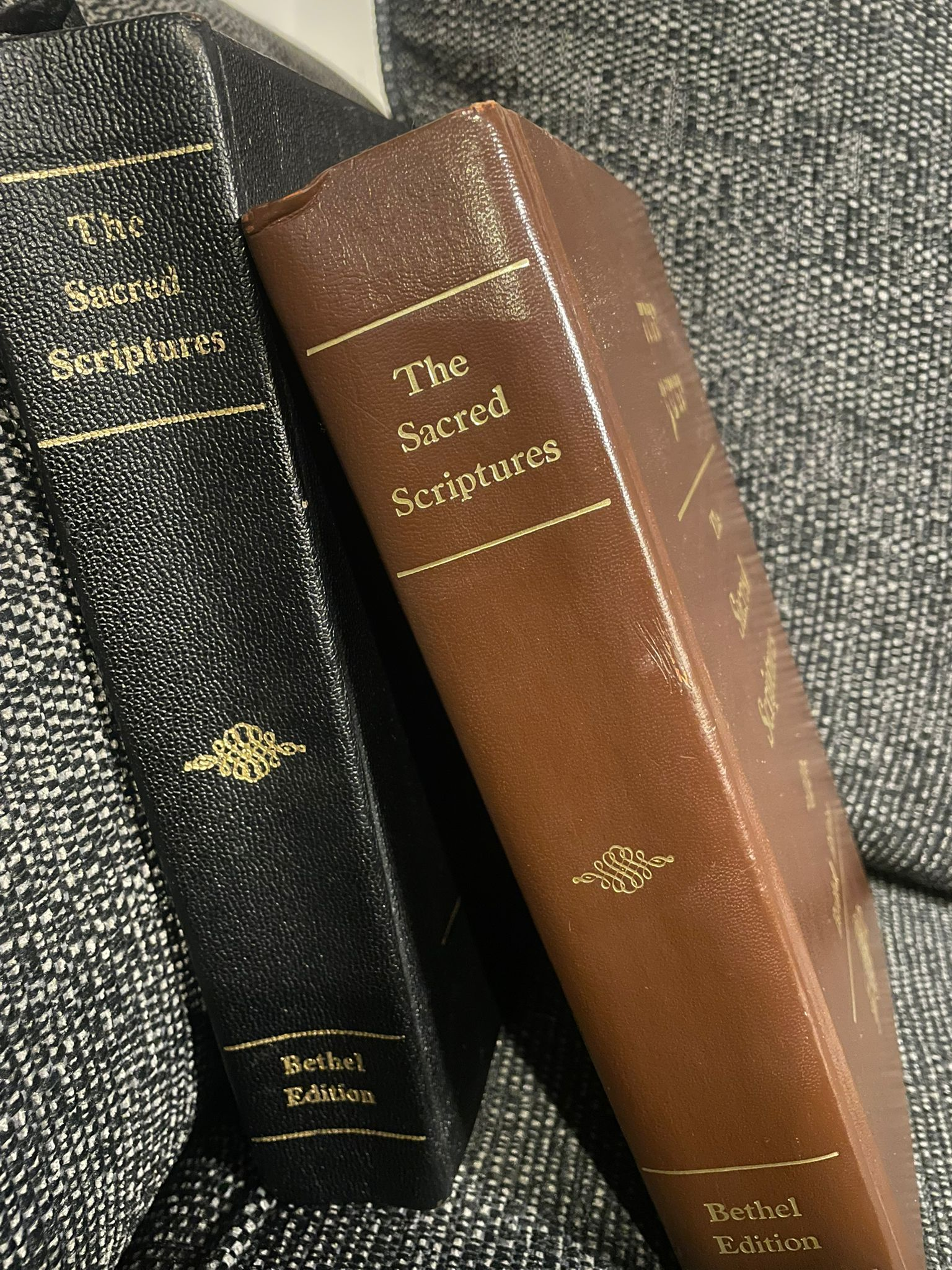
Two Sacred Scriptures Bethel Edition Bibles

The manuscripts were completed in 1981, and the Sacred Scriptures Bethel Edition went to press later that year. Copies were delivered to the International Headquarters between December 1981 and January 1982. Since its release, the SSBE has remained the official Bible of the Assemblies of Yahweh and is displayed at the Bethel Meeting Hall altar table, traditionally opened to Psalms 101–103.

== Notable aspects ==
=== Preface ===
The SSBE includes an extensive preface outlining the historical, linguistic, and theological basis for restoring the Sacred Names. It documents scholarly objections to the rendering “Jehovah,” frequently described in academic literature as a mispronunciation or artificial hybrid form.

Meyer wrote in the Sacred Name Broadcaster "the best transliteration of this name into English is spelled Yahweh, and is so pronounced". They therefore reject the English titles for God's name, claiming to trace such titles etymologically to the worship of other deities.

== Editions ==
As of 2016, the Sacred Scriptures Bethel Edition had undergone seven printings: 1981, 1986, 1989, 1993, 1997, 2001, and 2008. Copies are held in libraries in both the United States and England.

== See also ==
- Names and titles of God in the New Testament
- Nomina sacra
- Sacred Name Bible
