= Bethel, Berks County, Pennsylvania =

Unincorporated community in Pennsylvania, US

Bethel, Pennsylvania
- Census-designated place
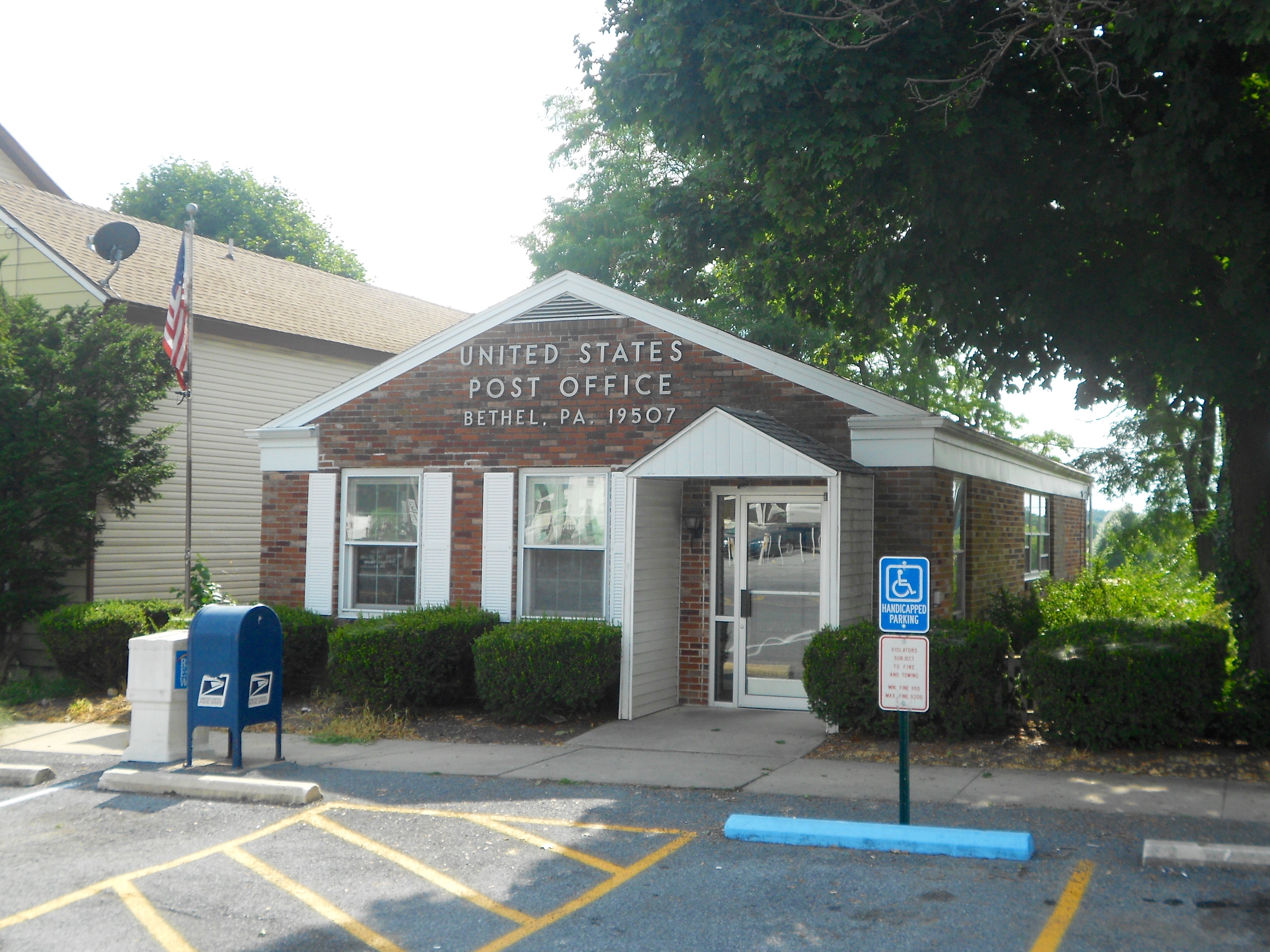
- Post Office

- Location within Pennsylvania Location within the United States
- Coordinates: 40°28′28″N 76°17′29″W
- Country: United States
- State: Pennsylvania
- County: Berks
- Township: Bethel
- Elevation: 568 ft (173 m)

Population (2010)
  - Total: 499
- Time zone: UTC-5 (Eastern (EST))
  - Summer (DST): UTC-4 (EDT)
- ZIP code: 19507
- Area code: 717
- GNIS feature ID: 1169353

Bethel is a census-designated place in Bethel Township, Berks County, Pennsylvania, United States. It is located at the junction of Interstate 78/U.S. Route 22 and Pennsylvania Route 501. It is in the Susquehanna watershed and drained southward into the Little Swatara Creek. Its area code is 717. As of the 2010 census, the population was 499. Bethel was the original location that Cabela's was going to build their new location before they decided to build it in Hamburg. It is the home to the international headquarters of the Assemblies of Yahweh, to several small town business shops, and to a large distribution center for Dollar General and PetSmart, which can be seen while driving down Interstate 78. The village was formerly known as "Millersburg."
