= Amplified Bible =

1965 English Bible translation

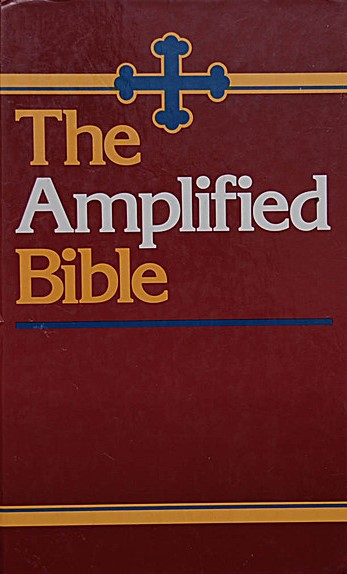
- Full name: The Amplified Bible: Containing the amplified Old Testament and the amplified New Testament
- Abbreviation: AMP
- OT published: 1962 and 1964
- NT published: 1958
- Complete Bible published: 1965
- Authorship: Zondervan (subsidiary of News Corp) and The Lockman Foundation.
- Translation type: Formal equivalence
- Reading level: 11.0
- Version revision: 1987, 2015
- Publisher: Zondervan Publishing House
- Copyright: 1954, 1958, 1962, 1964, 1965, 1987, 2015
- Webpage: www.lockman.org/amplified-bible-amp/
- Genesis 1:1–3 In the beginning God (Elohim) created [by forming from nothing] the heavens and the earth. The earth was formless and void or a waste and emptiness, and darkness was upon the face of the deep [primeval ocean that covered the unformed earth]. The Spirit of God was moving (hovering, brooding) over the face of the waters. And God said, “Let there be light”; and there was light. John 3:16 For God so [greatly] loved and dearly prized the world, that He [even] gave His [One and] only begotten Son, so that whoever believes and trusts in Him [as Savior] shall not perish, but have eternal life.

The Amplified Bible (AMP) is an English language translation of the Bible produced jointly by Zondervan and The Lockman Foundation. The first edition as a complete volume was published in 1965. "Amplifications" are words or phrases intended to more fully bring out the meaning of the original text but distinguished from the translation itself by a unique system of brackets, parentheses, and italics. The translation is largely one of formal equivalence (word-for-word).

== History ==
Frances Siewert (1881–1967) was active in Christian education and the widow of a Presbyterian minister who died in 1940.

Mrs. Siewert began working on the Amplified New Testament in 1952 with financial support from the Lockman Foundation. She used the American Standard Version as a base text and added "amplifications" that explained the meaning of Greek words, added historical details, or provided synonyms. The complete New Testament was published by Zondervan in 1958.

With continuing support from the Lockman Foundation and Zondervan, she then devoted herself to a similar edition of the Old Testament, relying heavily on the 1952 Revised Standard Version. Her two Old Testament volumes were published in 1962 and 1964. The Lockman Foundation then employed several scholars to revise the entire work for a one-volume edition, which was published in 1965.

In 1987 an expanded edition was published with additional amplifications; that version is now referred to as the Classic Edition (AMPC).

In 2015 the Amplified Bible was updated again for readability and clarity, with refreshed English and improved amplifications.

== Translation methodology ==
The Amplified Bible largely offers a word-for-word (formal equivalence) translation, in contrast to thought-for-thought (dynamic equivalence) translations at the opposite end of the Bible translation spectrum. Amplification is indicated by parentheses, brackets, italicized conjunctions, and bold or italicized text. Each form provides different kinds of information to the individual reader.

Theologian Gordon Fee and Mark Strauss stated that the Amplified Bible

is unique among Bible versions in that it provides "amplifications"—synonyms and explanations in brackets and parentheses within the text […] The strength of this version is that it acknowledges that no single English word or phrase can capture precisely the meaning of the Hebrew or Greek.

However, they also criticized it in that it has

had a run of popularity far beyond its worth. It is far better to use several translations, note where they differ, and then check out these differences in another source than to be led to believe that a word can mean one of several things in any given sentence, with the reader left to choose whatever best strikes his or her fancy.

Andreas J. Köstenberger, David A. Croteau, and Joe Stowell remark that the Amplified Bible is "truly one of the most unique English translations," in which nuances in translation are indicated using various punctuation marks such as words or phrases in brackets, to show that they are "not explicitly contained in the original texts."

But the translation has also been viewed as being guilty of so-called "illegitimate totality transfer" (a phrase coined by biblical scholar James Barr) by giving multiple potential meanings of a word in a particular passage. Readers may incorrectly conclude that multiple meanings of a word may apply regardless of the one which context would suggest.

== Comparison example ==
Acts 16:31 is the example used in the Publisher's Foreword, illustrating some of the features of the Amplified Bible, in comparison with other translations:

Acts 16:31, King James Version: And they said, Believe on the Lord Jesus Christ, and thou shalt be saved, and thy house.

Acts 16:31, American Standard Version: And they said, Believe on the Lord Jesus, and thou shalt be saved, thou and thy house.

Acts 16:31, Amplified Bible: And they answered, “Believe in the Lord Jesus [as your personal Savior and entrust yourself to Him] and you will be saved, you and your household [if they also believe]."
