= George Thomas Kurian =

Indian historian and writer (1931–2015)

- Born: George Babu Thomas Kurian; 3 August 1931; Changanassery
- Died: 2015 (aged 83–84)
- Occupation: Encyclopedist

George Thomas Kurian (August 4, 1931 Changanacherry – 2015) was an Indian (naturalized U.S. citizen) historian and writer known for editing several encyclopedias and reference works. Kurian also was founder and president of the Society of Encyclopedists. He was coeditor of the World Christian Encyclopedia, The Encyclopedia of Christian Civilizations, the Dictionary of Christianity, and Encyclopedia of Christian Literature.

== Life ==
In 1951 Kurian earned a M.A. from Madras Christian College.

Kurian was the president of the Encyclopedia Society and the editor of 65 books including 28 encyclopedias. He was also a fellow of the World Academy of Art and Science.

He had a wife, Annie, and a daughter.

== Some works ==
- George Thomas Kurian (1966). Dictionary of Indian English.
- George Thomas Kurian (1973). Children's Literary Almanac.
- George Thomas Kurian (1975). The Directory of American Book Publishing: From Founding Fathers to Today's Conglomerates.
- George Thomas Kurian (1989). World Encyclopedia of Police Forces and Penal Systems.
- George Thomas Kurian (1997). Illustrated Book of World Rankings CD.
- George Thomas Kurian (2001). Datapedia of the United States, 1790-2005: America Year by Year. Lanham, MD: Bernan Press. ISBN 978-1-59888-223-0. OCLC 51028912.
- George Thomas Kurian, ed. (2013). Fitzroy Dearborn Book of World Rankings. Routledge. ISBN 978-1-135-92470-6.
