= Yahshua =

Proposed transliteration of the name Jesus

Yahshua is a proposed transliteration of יהושוע, the original Hebrew name of Jesus. The pronunciation Yahshua is philologically impossible in the original Hebrew and has support neither in archeological findings, such as inscriptions or the Dead Sea Scrolls, nor in rabbinical texts as a form of Joshua. Scholarship generally considers the original form of Jesus to be Yeshua, a Hebrew Bible form of Joshua.

Usage and/or support of the name Yahshua is largely restricted to religious groups that are a part of (or otherwise associated with) the Sacred Name and Hebrew Roots which, among other things, advocate for the preservation of Hebrew/Arabic sacred names in translations of the Bible.

== Etymology ==
The English Jesus is a transliteration of the Greek Ἰησοῦς, or Iēsoûs. In translations of the Hebrew Bible into Ancient Greek, Iēsoûs was used to represent the Hebrew/Aramaic name Yeshua, a derivation of the earlier Hebrew Yehoshua, or Joshua. The Hebrew meaning of Joshua is "salvation." Some scholars believe that both names mean 'YHWH saves'. As a result, it is a commonly accepted fact within academia that Jesus' native Hebrew/Aramaic name was Yeshua.

Sacred Name believers interpret John 5:43 ("I have come in my Father's name") to mean that the Messiah literally needed the name (or part of the name) Yahweh in his own name: "Yahushua," rather than "Yeshua." According to Michael L. Brown, this is ignoring the language and using a theological argument.

== Usage ==
The pronunciation of the older and longer name as Yehoshua is attested to since ancient times. In the 19th century, the Second Great Awakening led to a religious revival of Protestantism in America which spawned several divergent movements. Among these newfound movements was Adventism, which, among other things, mandated a return to the recognition of the Jewish Sabbath as the Christian Sabbath. Part of a larger attitude to reorient Christianity to what was considered its Jewish roots, Adventism eventually gave rise to groups such as the Assemblies of Yahweh, which taught that the Tetragrammaton should be directly translated as Yahweh as opposed to the traditional translation of simply "LORD". As a part of this, attempts were made to more directly correlate Jesus to the Israelite god.

== Language of the New Testament ==
The oldest currently-known New Testament manuscripts, particularly those containing more than a handful of verses (as some early papyrus fragments do), were copied a few centuries later than the original individual New Testament books would have been written. The Assemblies of Yahweh believe that during this time these manuscripts, which are extant in Greek, most likely were translated. However, the general consensus of Bible scholars is that the New Testament was originally written only in Koine Greek (save for a number of words); the claim of the Assemblies of Yahweh therefore received no traction in academia.

As a result, the names Yahweh and Yahshua should have appeared in the original Hebrew or Aramaic texts of the New Testament, according to the Assemblies of Yahweh; but no such texts existed, according to Bible scholars. Due to the decision by Jews to no longer pronounce the name, the message of Yahshua – that Yahweh is salvation – would have angered many, argue the Assemblies of Yahweh for their own (fringe) belief. George Howard of the University of Georgia considers the possibility that the Tetragrammaton was retained in the first documents of the Greek translation just as it had been retained in the Septuagint translation of the Hebrew Scriptures.

Although the original manuscripts could be called inspired, Meyer writes that "there is no such thing as an inspired translation." Mistakes are sometimes made in translation and are passed down to each subsequent translation. An example of a perceived mistake by a translator translating the Hebrew original manuscripts is found in Revelation 19:16. The scripture there says that the Messiah has a name written on his thigh. That lacks sense, but when considering the original Hebrew, the root problem becomes clear. As explained by the Assemblies of Yahweh:

The word thigh in the Hebrew is 'ragel' (#7271 in Strong's) while it should be banner "dagel" (#1714). Evidently a sloppy scribe omitted the little extension on the top of the dalet and made it into a resh, changing from a Hebrew 'Dālet ד(d) to a Hebrew Rēsh ר(r).

Such arguments have been roundly rejected by academia in which the idea that the texts of the New Testament were translations from Hebrew or Aramaic got no traction.

== Criticisms ==
The pronunciation of Yahshua is impossible on a number of levels. It violates basic Hebrew phonology, as Hebrew linguistics do not allow the waw (ו), as in יהושע (Yehoshua), to be silent. The pronunciation Yahshua likewise cannot be found with that spelling anywhere in history, in writings in Hebrew or otherwise, prior to the 1900s.

The Hebrew scholar Michael L. Brown emphatically denies that "Yahshua" was the Hebrew name of Jesus:

The original Hebrew-Aramaic name of Jesus is yeshu'a, which is short for yehōshu'a (Joshua), just as Mike is short for Michael. ... Why then do some people refer to Jesus as Yahshua? There is absolutely no support for this pronunciation—none at all—and I say this as someone holding a Ph.D. in Semitic languages. My educated guess is that some zealous but linguistically ignorant people thought that Yahweh's name must have been a more overt part of our Savior's name, hence YAHshua rather than Yeshua—but again, there is no support of any kind for this theory. ... The original form of the name Jesus is yeshu'a, and there is no such name as yahshu'a (or, yahushua or the like).

So, for the record, once again, THERE IS NO SUCH NAME AS YAHSHUA. It didn't exist in biblical times and it has not existed as a genuine Hebrew name in history—until people who really didn't understand Hebrew made it up, thinking that it somehow restored the "Yah" element (from "Yahweh") into the Savior's name ... there's no such either as Yahushua—Joshua was pronounced ye-ho-shu-ah.

== See also ==
- Names and titles of Jesus in the New Testament
