= American Standard Version =

1901 English translation of the Bible

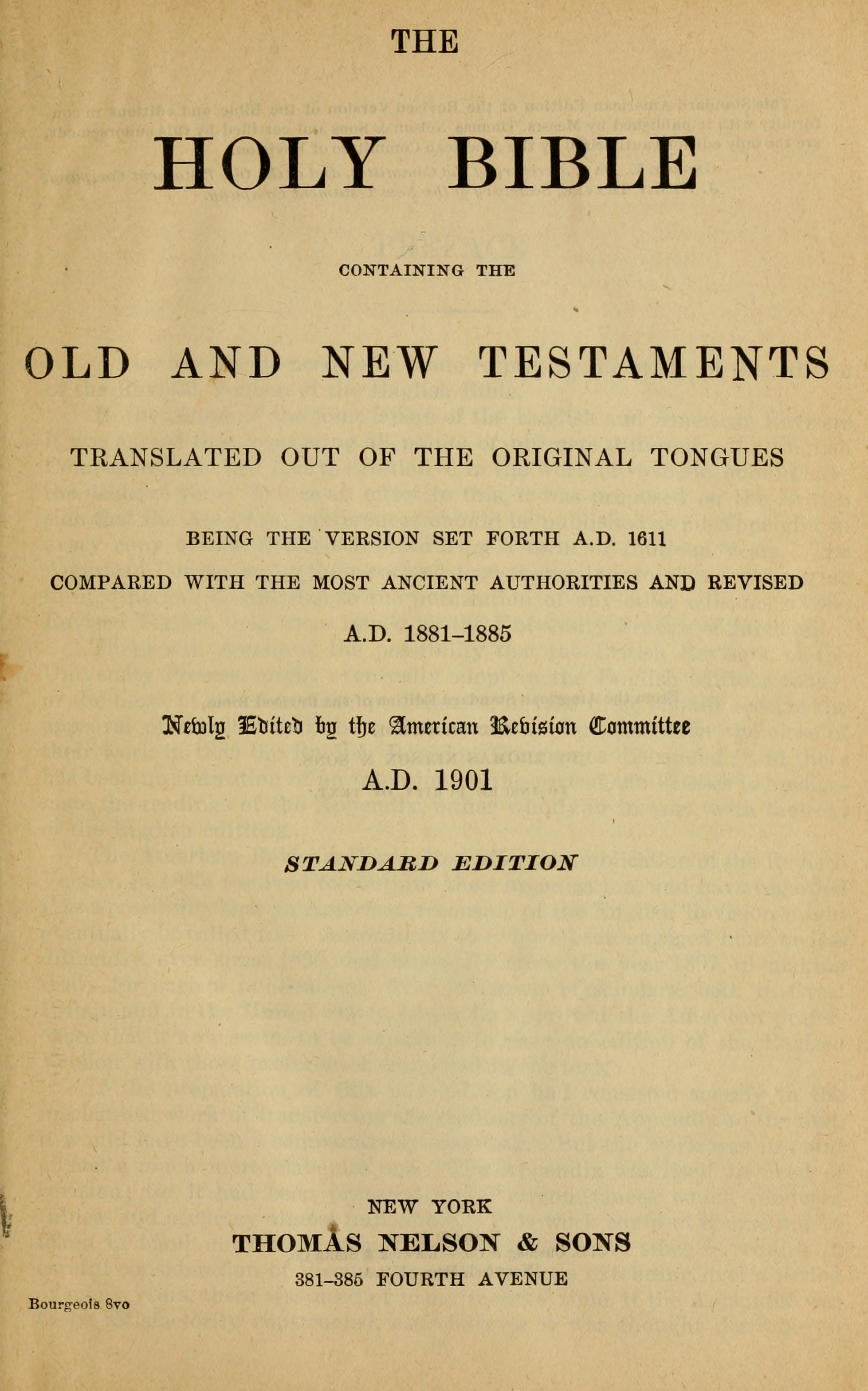
- Title page of the American Standard Version
- Full name: Revised Version, Standard American Edition
- Abbreviation: ASV
- NT published: 1900
- Complete Bible published: 1901
- Online as: American Standard Version at Wikisource
- Derived from: English Revised Version 1881–1885
- Textual basis: NT: Westcott and Hort 1881 and Tregelles 1857, (Reproduced in a single, continuous, form in Palmer 1881). OT: Masoretic Text (with some Septuagint influence).
- Version revision: 1929 (copyright renewal)
- Copyright: Copyright expired
- Genesis 1:1–3 In the beginning God created the heavens and the earth. And the earth was waste and void; and darkness was upon the face of the deep: and the Spirit of God moved upon the face of the waters. And God said, Let there be light: and there was light. John 3:16 For God so loved the world, that he gave his only begotten Son, that whosoever believeth on him should not perish, but have eternal life.

The American Standard Version (ASV), officially Revised Version, Standard American Edition, is a Bible translation into English that was completed in 1901 with the publication of the revision of the Old Testament. The revised New Testament had been published in 1900.

It was previously known by its full name, but soon came to have other names, such as the American Revised Version, the American Standard Revision, the American Standard Revised Bible, and the American Standard Edition.

== History ==
The American Standard Version, which was also known as The American Revision of 1901, is rooted in the British work begun in 1870 to revise the King James Bible of 1611. This project eventually produced the (English) Revised Version in the UK in 1885. An invitation was extended to American religious leaders for scholars to work on the RV (ERV) project. In 1871, thirty scholars were chosen by Philip Schaff. The denominations represented on the American committee were the Baptist, Congregationalist, Dutch Reformed, Friends, Methodist, Episcopal, Presbyterian, Protestant Episcopal, and Unitarian. These scholars began work in 1872. Three of the editors, the youngest in years, became the editors of the American Standard Revised New Testament: Drs. Timothy Dwight V, Joseph Henry Thayer and Matthew B. Riddle.

The Revised Version's New Testament was published in 1881, the Old Testament in 1885, and the Apocrypha in 1894, after which the British team disbanded. Unauthorized copies of the RV then appeared in the US, having the American team suggestions in the main text. This was possible because while the RV in the UK held a Crown copyright as a product of the University Presses of Oxford and Cambridge, this protection did not extend to the US where the text was not separately copyrighted. In 1898, Oxford and Cambridge Universities published their editions of the RV with some American suggestions included. However, these suggestions were reduced in number from those in the appendices. Some of the Americanized editions by Oxford and Cambridge Universities had the title of "American Revised Version" on the cover of their spines. Some of Thomas Nelson's editions of the American Standard Version Holy Bible included the Apocrypha of the Revised Version. The Revised Version of 1885 and the American Standard Version of 1901 are among the Bible versions authorized to be used in services of the Episcopal Church and the Church of England. The American Standard Version entered the public domain on January 1, 1957, upon the expiry of its copyright.

== Features ==
The Tetragrammaton is consistently rendered Jehovah in 6,823 places of the ASV Old Testament, rather than LORD as it appears mostly in the King James Bible and Revised Version of 1881–85. There are seven verses in the King James Bible where the divine name appears: Genesis 22:14, Exodus 6:3, Exodus 17:15, Judges 6:24, Psalm 83:18, Isaiah 12:2 and Isaiah 26:4 plus its abbreviated form, Jah, in Psalms 68:4. The English Revised Version (1881–1885, published with the Apocrypha in 1894) renders the Tetragrammaton as Jehovah where it appears in the King James Version, and another eight times in Exodus 6:2,6–8, Psalm 68:20, Isaiah 49:14, Jeremiah 16:21 and Habakkuk 3:19 plus as its abbreviated form, Jah, twice in Psalm 68:4 and Psalm 89:8. The reason for this change, as the Committee explained in the preface, was that "the American Revisers [...] were brought to the unanimous conviction that a Jewish superstition, which regarded the Divine Name as too sacred to be uttered, ought no longer to dominate in the English or any other version of the Old Testament".

== Revisions ==
The ASV has been the basis of various revisions and new translations:

- Revised Standard Version (1952)
- Amplified Bible (1965)
- New American Standard Bible (1971)
- The Living Bible (1971)
- Sacred Scriptures Bethel Edition (1981)
- Holy Bible Recovery Version (1999)
- World English Bible (2000)
- American Literary Version (also known as Bibliotheca) (2016)
- Refreshed American Standard Version (2021)
- Updated American Standard Version (UASV, 2022).
