= John 1:1 =

- ← Luke 24 1:2 →
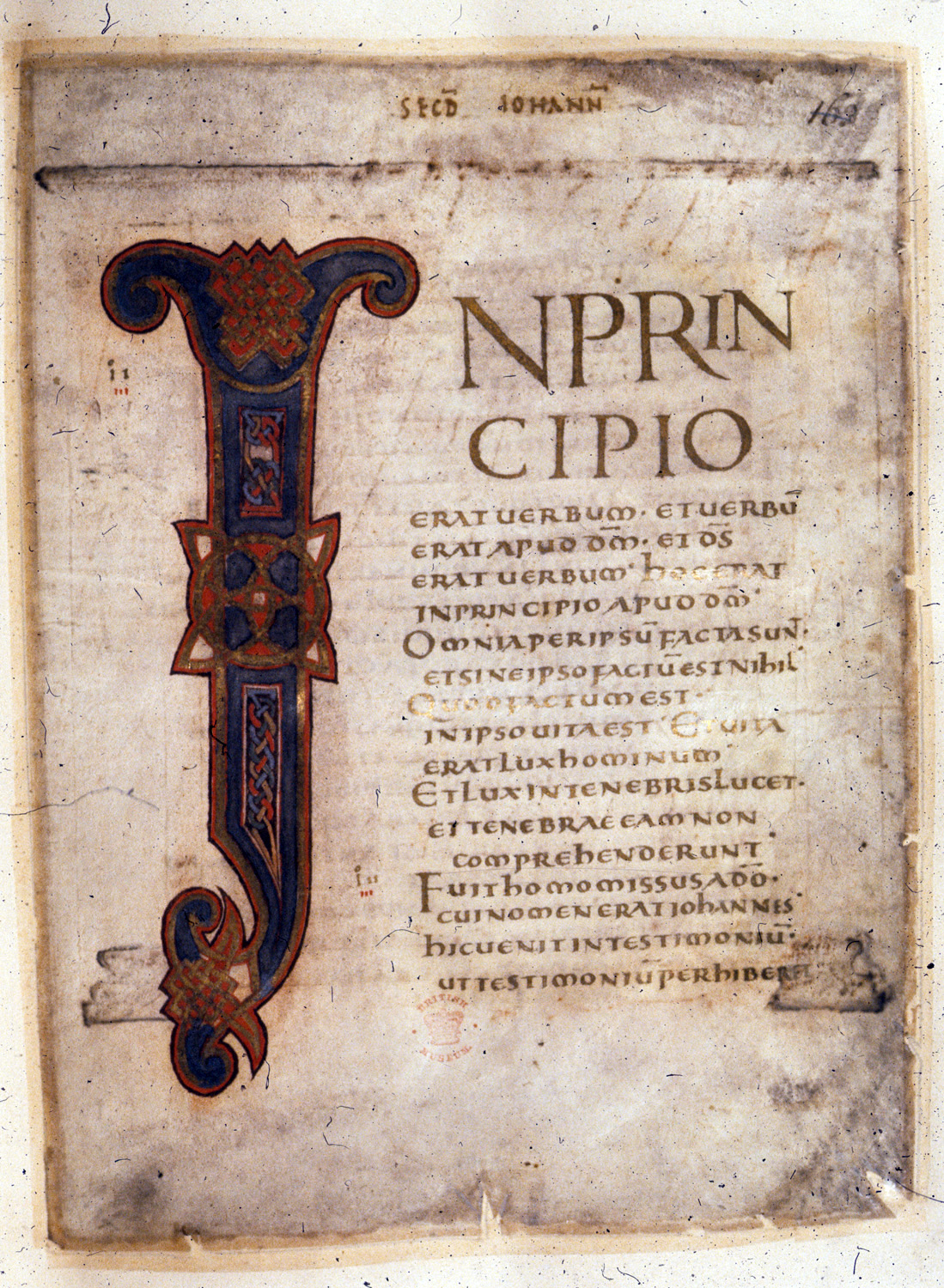
- First page of John's Gospel from the Coronation Gospels, c. 10th century.
- Book: Gospel of John
- Christian Bible part: New Testament

John 1:1 is the first verse in the opening chapter of the Gospel of John in the New Testament of the Christian Bible. The traditional and majority translation of this verse reads:

In the beginning was the Word, and the Word was with God, and the Word was God.

Other translations have been made or considered.

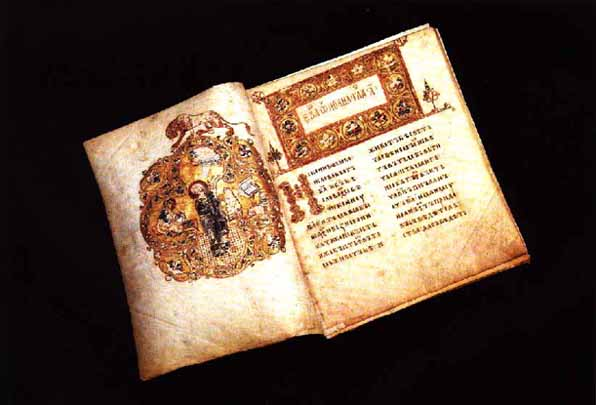
John 1:1 from the Ostromir Gospel, with John's Evangelist portrait, 1056 or 1057.

"The Word", a translation of the Greek λόγος (logos), is widely interpreted as referring to Jesus, as indicated in other verses later in the same chapter, for example, "the Word became flesh, and dwelt among us" (John 1:14; cf. 1:15, 17).

== History ==
This text was composed sometime between 70-110AD.

Tertullian, in the early third century, used this verse in developing his views on the Trinity, although he noted that the majority of the believers in his day found issue with his doctrine. He wrote:

Now if this one [the Word] is God according to John ("the Word was God"), then you have two: one who speaks that it may be, and another who carries it out. However, how you should accept this as "another" I have explained: as concerning person, not substance, and as distinction, not division.

In the same text, he uses Psalm 45:6:

And that you may think more fully on this, accept also that in the Psalm two gods are mentioned: "Thy throne, God, is forever, a rod of right direction is the rod of thy kingdom; thou hast loved justice and hated iniquity, therefore God, thy God, hath anointed thee." If he is speaking to a god, and the god is anointed by a god, then also here he affirms two gods... More is what you will find just the same in the Gospel: "In the beginning was the Word, and the Word was with God, and the Word was God": One who was, and another in whose presence he was.

Origen of Alexandria, a teacher in Greek grammar of the third century, wrote about the use of the definite article:

We next notice John's use of the article in these sentences. He does not write without care in this respect, nor is he unfamiliar with the niceties of the Greek tongue. In some cases he uses the article, and in some he omits it. He adds the article to the Logos, but to the name of God he adds it sometimes only. He uses the article, when the name of God refers to the uncreated cause of all things, and omits it when the Logos is named God [...] Now there are many who are sincerely concerned about religion, and who fall here into great perplexity. They are afraid that they may be proclaiming two Gods, and their fear drives them into doctrines which are false and wicked. Either they deny that the Son has a distinct nature of His own besides that of the Father, and make Him whom they call the Son to be God all but the name, or they deny the divinity of the Son, giving Him a separate existence of His own, and making His sphere of essence fall outside that of the Father, so that they are separable from each other. [...] The true God, then, is "The God."

== Source text and translations ==
Language	John 1:1 text
Koine Greek	Ἐν ἀρχῇ ἦν ὁ Λόγος, καὶ ὁ Λόγος ἦν πρὸς τὸν Θεόν, καὶ Θεὸς ἦν ὁ Λόγος. En arkhêi ên ho Lógos, kaì ho Lógos ên pròs tòn Theón, kaì Theòs ên ho Lógos.
Syriac Peshitta	ܒ݁ܪܺܫܺܝܬ݂ ܐܺܝܬ݂ܰܘܗ݈ܝ ܗ݈ܘܳܐ ܡܶܠܬ݂ܳܐ ܘܗܽܘ ܡܶܠܬ݂ܳܐ ܐܺܝܬ݂ܰܘܗ݈ܝ ܗ݈ܘܳܐ ܠܘܳܬ݂ ܐܰܠܳܗܳܐ ܘܰܐܠܳܗܳܐ ܐܺܝܬ݂ܰܘܗ݈ܝ ܗ݈ܘܳܐ ܗܽܘ ܡܶܠܬ݂ܳܐ ܀ brīšīṯ ʾiṯauhi hwā milṯā, whu milṯā ʾiṯauhi hwā luaṯ ʾalāhā; wʾalāhā iṯauhi hwā hu milṯā.
Sahidic Coptic	Ϩⲛ̄ ⲧⲉϩⲟⲩⲉⲓⲧⲉ ⲛⲉϥϣⲟⲟⲡ ⲛ̄ϭⲓⲡϣⲁϫⲉ. ⲁⲩⲱ ⲡϣⲁϫⲉ ⲛⲉϥϣⲟⲟⲡ ⲛ̄ⲛⲁϩⲣⲙ̄ ⲡⲛⲟⲩⲧⲉ. ⲁⲩⲱ ⲛⲉⲩⲛⲟⲩⲧⲉ ⲡⲉ ⲡϣⲁϫⲉ. Hen tehoueite nefšoop encipšače. Auō pšače nefšoop ennahrem pnoute. Auō neunoute pe pšače.
Bohairic Coptic	Ϧⲉⲛ ⲧⲁⲣⲭⲏ ⲛⲉ ⲡⲓⲥⲁϫⲓ ⲡⲉ. ⲟⲩⲟϩ ⲡⲓⲥⲁϫⲓ ⲛⲁϥⲭⲏ ϧⲁⲧⲉⲛ ⲫ’ϯ. ⲟⲩⲟϩ ⲛⲉ ⲟⲩⲛⲟⲩϯ ⲡⲉ ⲡⲓⲥⲁϫⲓ. Xen tarkhē ne pisači pe. Ouoh pisači nafkhē xaten ephnouti. Ouoh ne ounouti pe pisači.
Vetus Latina	In principio erat Verbum. Et Verbum erat apud Deum. Et Deus erat Verbum.
Latin Vulgate	In principio erat Verbum, et Verbum erat apud Deum, et Deus erat Verbum.

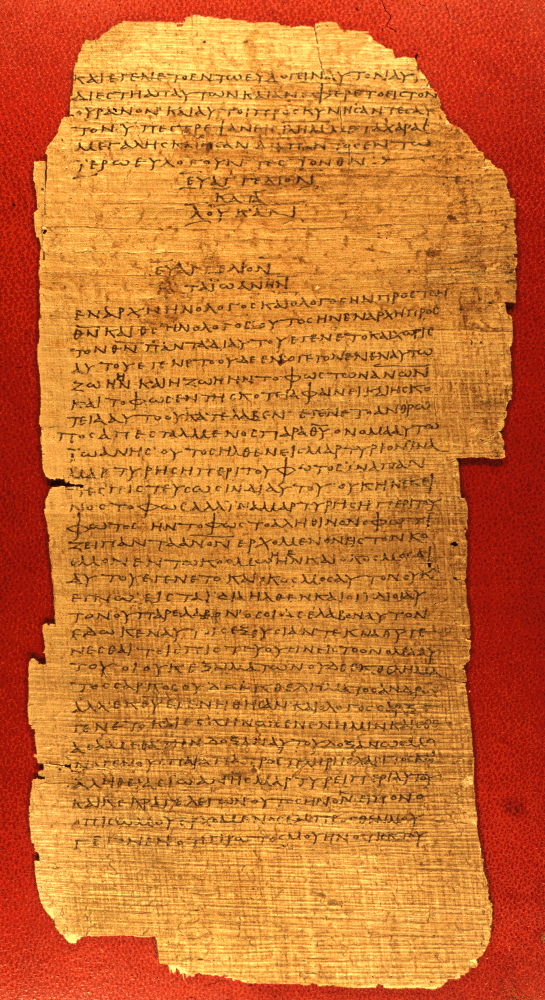
Papyrus 75 (175–225), the end of Gospel of Luke and the beginning of Gospel of John (chapter 1:1–16*)

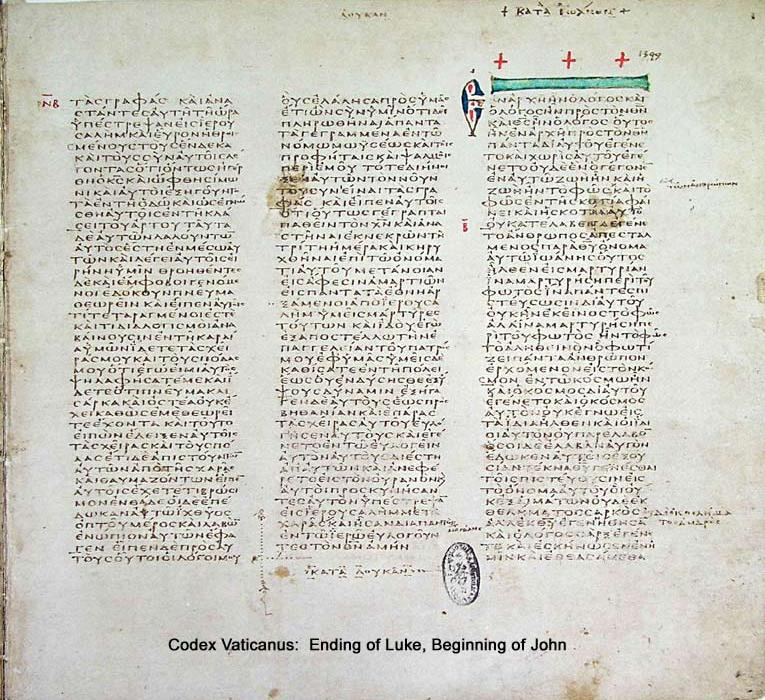
Codex Vaticanus (300–325), The end of Gospel of Luke and the beginning of Gospel of John

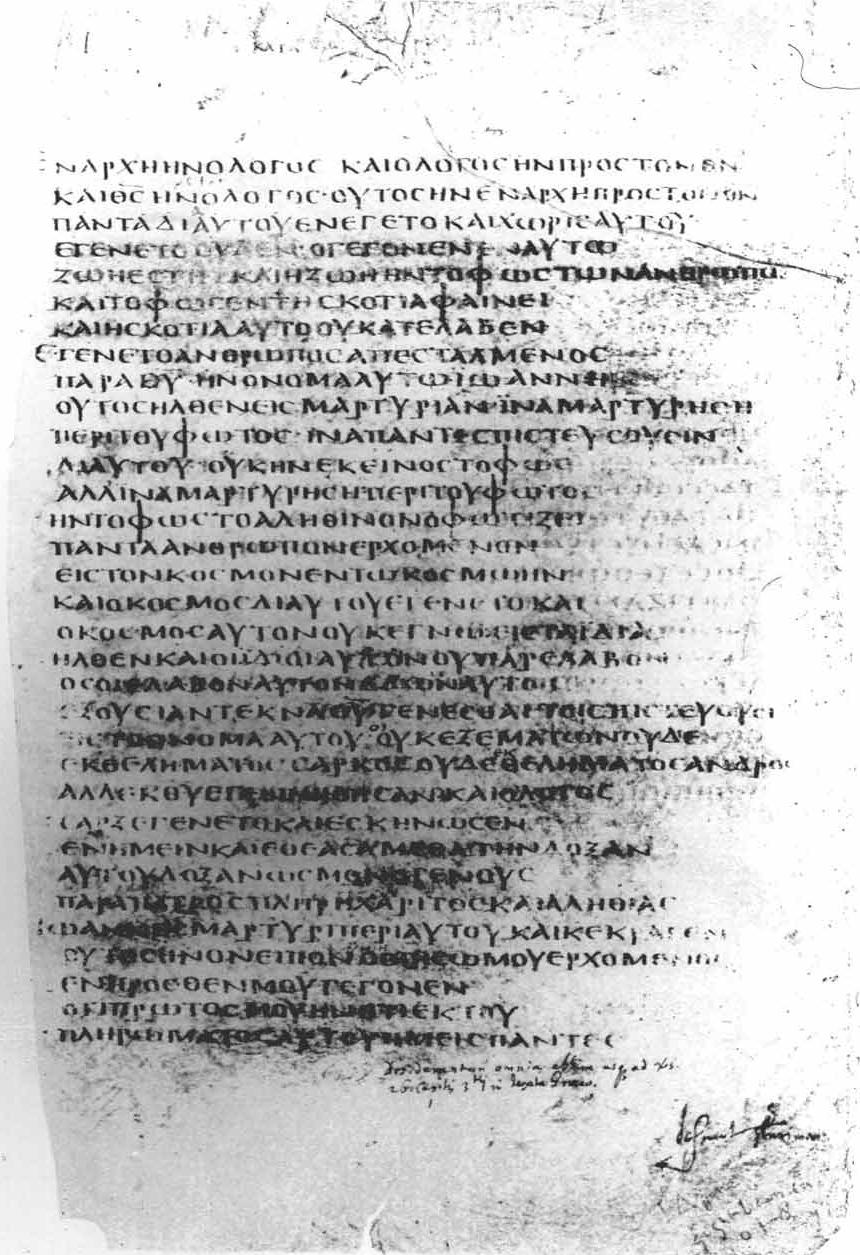
Codex Bezae (c. 400), John 1:1–16

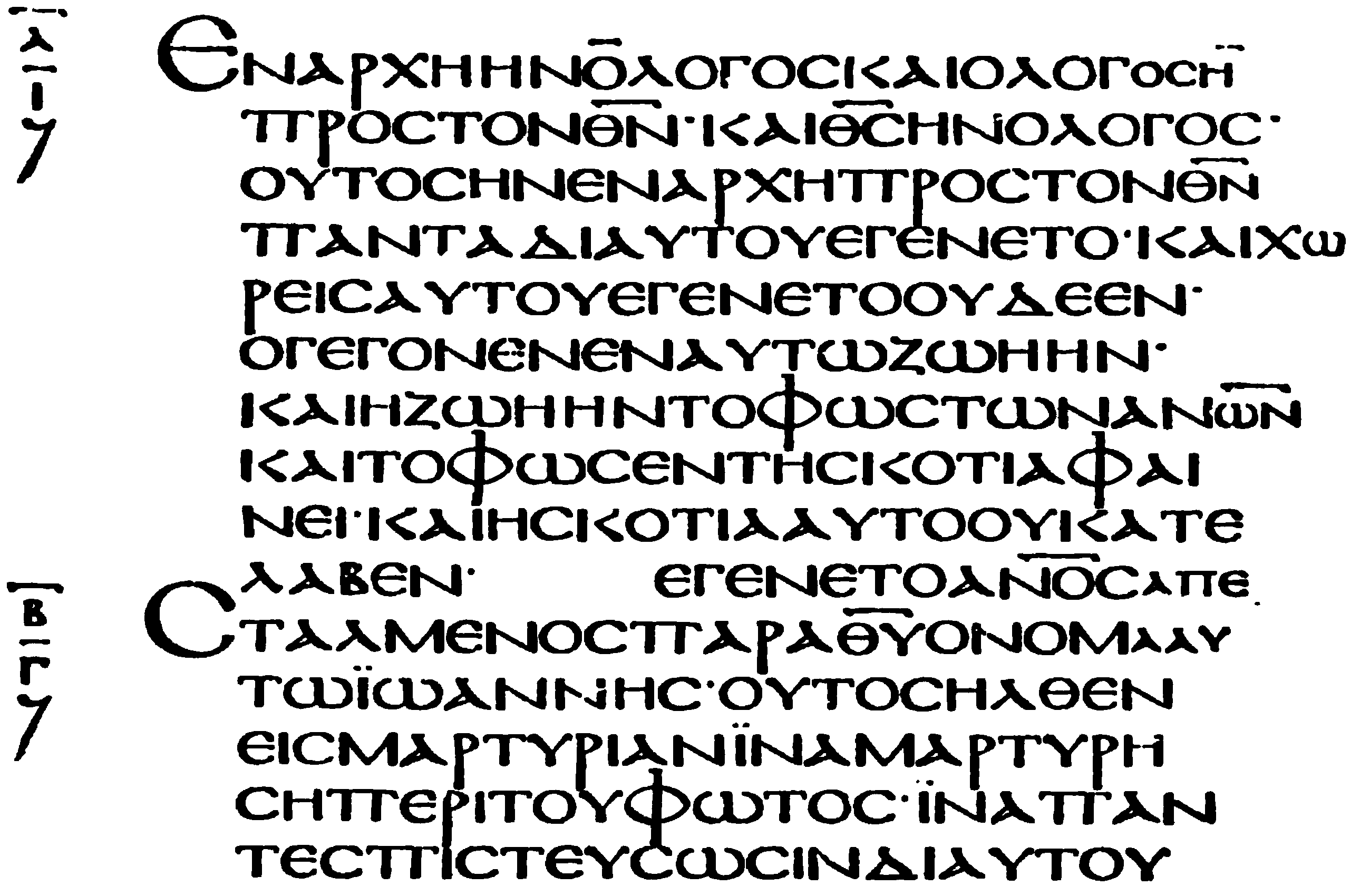
Codex Alexandrinus (400-440), John 1:1–7.

=== John 1:1 in English versions ===
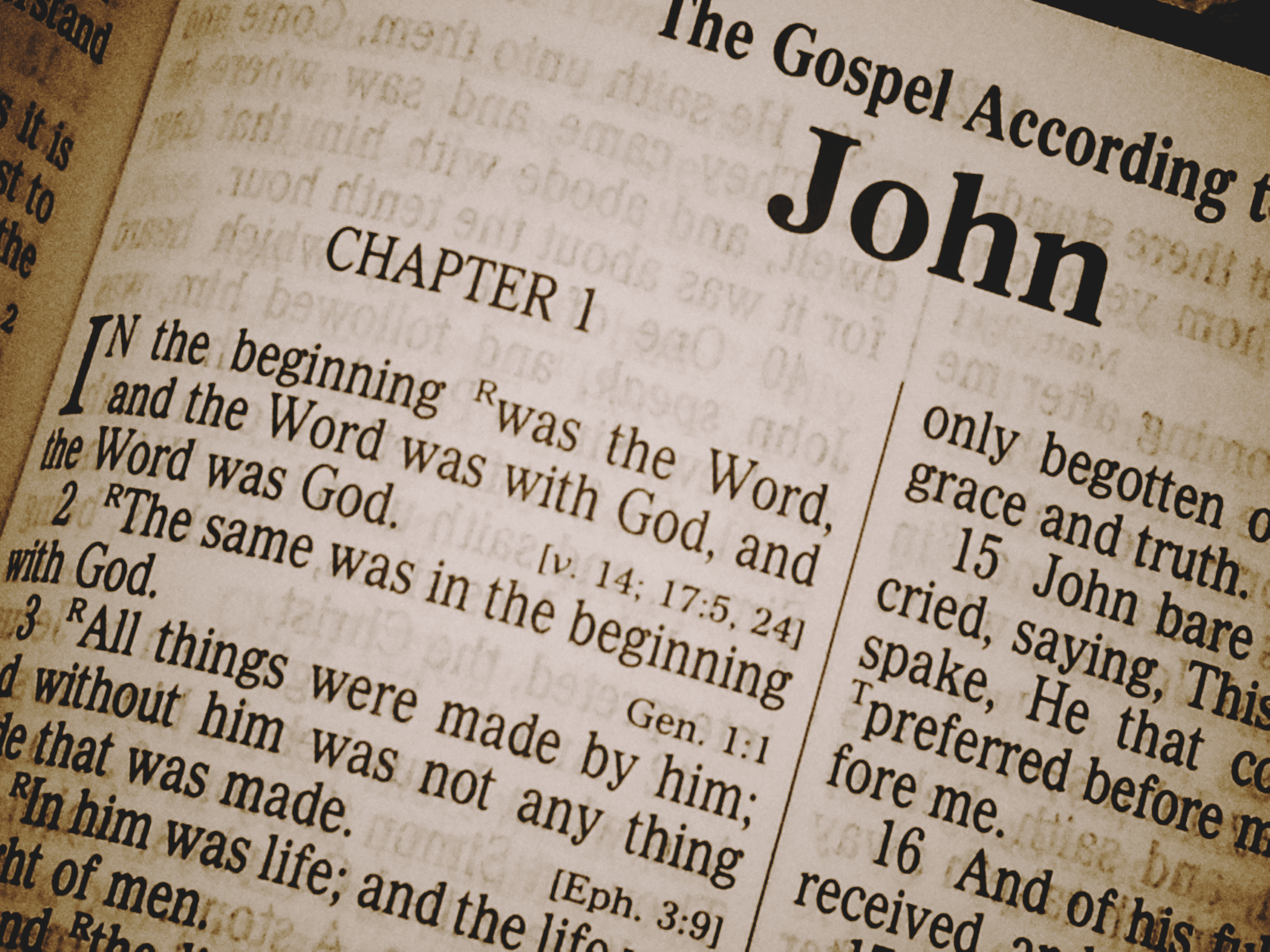
John 1:1 in the page showing the first chapter of John in the King James Bible.

The traditional rendering in English is:

In the beginning was the Word, and the Word was with God, and the Word was God.

Other variations of rendering, both in translation or paraphrase, John 1:1c also exist:

- 14th century: "and God was the word" – Wycliffe's Bible (translated from the 4th-century Latin Vulgate)
- 1808: "and the Word was a god" – Thomas Belsham The New Testament, in an Improved Version, Upon the Basis of Archbishop Newcome's New Translation: With a Corrected Text, London.
- 1822: "and the Word was a god" – The New Testament in Greek and English (A. Kneeland, 1822.)
- 1829: "and the Word was a god" – The Monotessaron; or, The Gospel History According to the Four Evangelists (J. S. Thompson, 1829)
- 1863: "and the Word was a god" – A Literal Translation of the New Testament (Herman Heinfetter [Pseudonym of Frederick Parker], 1863)
- 1864: "the LOGOS was God" – A New Emphatic Version (right hand column)
- 1864: "and a god was the Word" – The Emphatic Diaglott by Benjamin Wilson, New York and London (left hand column interlinear reading)
- 1867: "and the Son was of God" – The Joseph Smith Translation of the Bible
- 1879: "and the Word was a god" – Das Evangelium nach Johannes (J. Becker, 1979)
- 1885: "and the Word was a god" – Concise Commentary on The Holy Bible (R. Young, 1885)
- 1911: "and [a] God was the word" – The Coptic Version of the New Testament in the Southern Dialect, by George William Horner.
- 1924: "the Logos was divine" – The Bible: James Moffatt Translation, by James Moffatt.
- 1935: "and the Word was divine" – The Bible: An American Translation, by John M. P. Smith and Edgar J. Goodspeed, Chicago.
- 1955: "so the Word was divine" – The Authentic New Testament, by Hugh J. Schonfield, Aberdeen.
- 1956: "And the Word was as to His essence absolute deity" – The Wuest Expanded Translation
- 1958: "and the Word was a god" – The New Testament of Our Lord and Saviour Jesus Anointed (J. L. Tomanec, 1958);
- 1962, 1979: "'the word was God.' Or, more literally, 'God was the word.'" – The Four Gospels and the Revelation (R. Lattimore, 1979)
- 1966, 2001: "and he was the same as God" – The Good News Bible.
- 1970, 1989: "and what God was, the Word was" – The New English Bible and The Revised English Bible.
- 1975 "and a god (or, of a divine kind) was the Word" – Das Evangelium nach Johnnes, by Siegfried Schulz, Göttingen, Germany
- 1975: "and the Word was a god" – Das Evangelium nach Johannes (S. Schulz, 1975);
- 1978: "and godlike sort was the Logos" – Das Evangelium nach Johannes, by Johannes Schneider, Berlin
- 1985: "So the Word was divine" - The Original New Testament, by Hugh J. Schonfield.
- 1993: "The Word was God, in readiness for God from day one." — The Message, by Eugene H. Peterson.
- 1998: "and what God was the Word also was" – This translation follows Professor Francis J. Moloney, The Gospel of John, ed. Daniel J. Harrington.
- 2017: "and the Logos was god" - The New Testament: A Translation, by David Bentley Hart.

=== Difficulties ===
The text of John 1:1 has a sordid past and a myriad of interpretations. With the Greek alone, we can create empathic, orthodox, creed-like statements, or we can commit pure and unadulterated heresy. From the point of view of early church history, heresy develops when a misunderstanding arises concerning Greek articles, the predicate nominative, and grammatical word order. The early church heresy of Sabellianism understood John 1:1c to read, "and the Word was the God." The early church heresy of Arianism understood it to read, "and the word was a God."

— David A. Reed

There are two issues affecting the translating of the verse, 1) theology and 2) proper application of grammatical rules. The commonly held theology that Jesus is God may lead one to believe that the proper way to render the verse is the traditional rendering. The opposing theology that Jesus is subordinate to God as his Chief agent may lead to the conclusion that "... a god" or "... divine" is the proper rendering. This highlights the importance of understanding and applying the proper grammatical rules to any translation to avoid bias.

Augustine of Hippo discusses John 1:1–2 in connection with ambiguities caused by punctuation rather than vocabulary. In De doctrina christiana he contrasts the reading In principio erat Verbum, et Verbum erat apud Deum, et Deus erat Verbum. Hoc erat in principio apud Deum with what he calls a "heretical pointing", In principio erat verbum, et verbum erat apud Deum, et Deus erat. Verbum hoc erat in principio apud Deum, which leaves the wording unchanged but alters the pause so that the clause "and the Word was God" no longer appears as a single unit. Augustine interprets this alternative as motivated by an unwillingness to confess that the Word is God and maintains that, in light of the Church's "rule of faith" and its teaching on the equality of the Trinity, the verse should instead be read with the predicate in the form et Deus erat verbum followed by hoc erat in principio apud Deum.

=== The Greek Article ===
The Greek article is often translated the, which is the English definite article, but it can have a range of meanings that can be quite different from those found in English, and require context to interpret. Ancient Greek does not have an indefinite article like the English word a, and nominatives without articles can have a range of meanings that require context to interpret. In John 1:1c, "Theos" is a predicate nominative but has no article. Thus, it is called an anarthrous predicate, and makes translation more challenging.

=== Colwell's Rule ===
Some interpreters use Colwell's rule which says that a definite predicate which is before the verb "to be" usually does not have the definite article. This tentative formulation addresses whether a definite predicate nominative uses a definite article, but does not determine if a predicate nominative is definite. E. C. Colwell doesn't address in depth how to identify whether an anarthrous predicate is either definite, indefinite or qualitative, which needs to be determined from context. Ernest Cadman Colwell writes:

The opening verse of John's Gospel contains one of the many passages where this rule suggests the translation of a predicate as a definite noun. Καὶ θεὸς ἦν ὁ λόγος [Kaì theòs ên ho lógos] looks much more like "And the Word was God" than "And the Word was divine" when viewed with reference to this rule. The absence of the article does not make the predicate indefinite or qualitative when it precedes the verb, it is indefinite in this position only when the context demands it. The context makes no such demand in the Gospel of John, for this statement cannot be regarded as strange in the prologue of the gospel which reaches its climax in the confession of Thomas [Footnote: John 20:28].

— Ernest Cadman Cowell, A Definite Rule for the Use of the Article in the Greek New Testament, Journal of Biblical Literature, 52 (1933): 12-21

Philip Harner assessed that many of the anarthrous predicates preceding linking verbs that E. C. Colwell had identified as definite were actually qualitative. This challenges E. C. Colwell's results who acknowledged that they hinged on the accuracy of his determinations for each anarthrous predicate and that the difficulty of the challenge meant some mistakes were inevitable.

Many scholars misunderstand Colwell's rule. It can't be used to deduce whether the predicate is definite or not.

[...] they thought that the rule was: An anarthrous predicate nominative that precedes a verb is usually definite. This is not the rule, nor can it be implied from the rule.

— Daniel B. Wallace, Greek Grammar: Beyond the Basics - An Exegetical Syntax of the New Testament, p.257

Jason David BeDuhn (Professor of Religious Studies at Northern Arizona University) criticizes Colwell's Rule as methodologically unsound and "not a valid rule of Greek grammar."

Murray J. Harris says that when E. C. Colwell applied his rule to John 1:1c, he assumed that a predicate nominative could not simultaneously be definite and qualitative. The author of the Gospel of John could easily have resolved the uncertainty surrounding the predicate being definite, had that been his intention. This lends weight to the predicate having a qualitative nature, regardless of whether it is definite or indefinite.

== In the Beginning ==
"In the beginning (archē) was the Word (logos)" may be compared with:

- Genesis 1:1: "In the beginning God created heaven, and earth." The opening words of the Old Testament are also "In the beginning". Theologian Charles Ellicott wrote:

"The reference to the opening words of the Old Testament is obvious, and is the more striking when we remember that a Jew would constantly speak of and quote from the book of Genesis as "Berēshîth" ("in the beginning"). It is quite in harmony with the Hebrew tone of this Gospel to do so, and it can hardly be that St. John wrote his Berēshîth without having that of Moses present to his mind, and without being guided by its meaning.

- Mark 1:1: "The beginning of the gospel of Jesus Christ, the Son of God."
- Luke 1:2: "According as they have delivered them unto us, who from the beginning (archē) were eyewitnesses and ministers of the word (logos).
- 1 John 1:1: "That which was from the beginning (archē), which we have heard, which we have seen with our eyes, which we have looked upon, and our hands have handled, of the word (logos) of life".

== The Word was divine ==
The main dispute with respect to this verse relates to John 1:1c ("Θεὸς ἦν ὁ Λόγος" read "Theos ēn ho Logos"). One translation is "the Word was divine." The following support this type of translation:

=== Translations ===
Translations by James Moffatt, Edgar J. Goodspeed and Hugh J. Schonfield render part of the verse as "...the Word [Logos] was divine".

Murray J. Harris writes,

[It] is clear that in the translation "the Word was God", the term God is being used to denote his nature or essence, and not his person. But in normal English usage "God" is a proper noun, referring to the person of the Father or corporately to the three persons of the Godhead. Moreover, "the Word was God" suggests that "the Word" and "God" are convertible terms, that the proposition is reciprocating. But the Word is neither the Father nor the Trinity ... The rendering cannot stand without explanation."

An Eastern/Greek Orthodox Bible commentary notes:

This second theos could also be translated 'divine' as the construction indicates "a qualitative sense for theos". The Word is not God in the sense that he is the same person as the theos mentioned in 1:1a; he is not God the Father (God absolutely as in common NT usage) or the Trinity. The point being made is that the Logos is of the same uncreated nature or essence as God the Father, with whom he eternally exists. This verse is echoed in the Nicene Creed: "God (qualitative or derivative) from God (personal, the Father), Light from Light, True God from True God... homoousion with the Father."

Daniel B. Wallace (Professor of New Testament at Dallas Theological Seminary) argues that:

The use of the anarthrous theos (the lack of the definite article before the second theos) is due to its use as a qualitative noun, describing the nature or essence of the Word, sharing the essence of the Father, though they differed in person: he stresses: "The construction the evangelist chose to express this idea was the most precise way he could have stated that the Word was God and yet was distinct from the Father". He questions whether Colwell's rule helps in interpreting John 1:1. It has been said that Colwell's rule has been misapplied as its converse, as though it implied definiteness.

Murray J. Harris (Emeritus Professor of NT Exegesis and Theology at Trinity Evangelical Divinity School) discusses "grammatical, theological, historical, literary and other issues that affect the interpretation of θεὸς" and conclude that, among other uses, "is a christological title that is primarily ontological in nature" and adds that "the application of θεὸς to Jesus Christ asserts that Jesus is ... God-by-nature.

John L. McKenzie (Catholic Biblical scholar) wrote that ho Theos is God the Father, and adds that John 1:1 should be translated "the word was with the God [=the Father], and the word was God."

In a 1973 Journal of Biblical Literature article, Philip B. Harner, Professor Emeritus of Religion at Heidelberg College, claimed that the traditional translation of John 1:1c ("and the Word was God") is incorrect. He endorses the New English Bible translation of John 1:1c, "and what God was, the Word was." However, Harner's claim has been criticized. Harner says:

Perhaps the clause could be translated, 'the Word had the same nature as God." This would be one way of representing John's thought, which is, as I understand it, that ho logos, no less than ho theos, had the nature of theos.

B. F. Westcott is quoted by C. F. D. Moule (Lady Margaret's Professor of Divinity in the University of Cambridge):

The predicate (God) stands emphatically first, as in 4:24. 'It is necessarily without the article (theós not ho theós) inasmuch as it describes the nature of the Word and does not identify His Person. It would be pure Sabellianism to say "the Word was ho theós". No idea of inferiority of nature is suggested by the form of expression, which simply affirms the true deity of the Word. Compare the converse statement of the true humanity of Christ five 27 (hóti huiòs anthrópou estín . . . ).'

James D. G. Dunn (Emeritus Lightfoot Professor at University of Durham) states:

Philo demonstrates that a distinction between ho theos and theos such as we find in John 1.1b-c, would be deliberate by the author and significant for the Greek reader. Not only so, Philo shows that he could happily call the Logos 'God/god' without infringing his monotheism (or even 'the second God' – Qu.Gen. II.62). Bearing in mind our findings with regard to the Logos in Philo, this cannot but be significant: the Logos for Philo is 'God' not as a being independent of 'the God' but as 'the God' in his knowability – the Logos standing for that limited apprehension of the one God which is all that the rational man, even the mystic may attain to."

In summary, scholars and grammarians indicate that the grammatical structure of the Greek does not identify the Word as the Person of God but indicates a qualitative sense.

== The Word as a god ==
Some scholars believe it is possible, or even preferable, to translate the third part of the verse as ... was a god. Other scholars oppose this translation.

The rendering as "a god" is justified by some non-Trinitarians by comparing it with Acts 28:6 which has a similar grammatical construction:

"The people expected him to swell up or suddenly fall dead; but after waiting a long time and seeing nothing unusual happen to him, they changed their minds and said he was a god."

"Howbeit they looked when he should have swollen, or fallen down dead suddenly: but after they had looked a great while, and saw no harm come to him, they changed their minds, and said that he was a god (theón)." (KJV)

"But they were expecting that he was going to swell up or suddenly drop dead. So after they had waited a long time and had seen nothing unusual happen to him, they changed their minds and said he was a god (theón)." (NET)

However, it was noted that the Hebrew words El, HaElohim and Yahweh (all referring to God) were rendered as anarthrous theos in the Septuagint at Nahum 1:2, Isaiah 37:16, 41:4, Jeremiah 23:23 and Ezekiel 45:9 among many other locations. Moreover, in the New Testament anarthrous theos was used to refer to God in locations including John 1:18a, Romans 8:33, 2 Corinthians 5:19, 6:16 and Hebrews 11:16 (although the last two references do have an adjective aspect to them). Therefore, anarthrous or arthrous constructions by themselves, without context, cannot determine how to render it into a target language. In Deuteronomy 31:27 the septuagint text, "supported by all MSS... reads πρὸς τὸν θεόν for the Hebrew עִם־ יְהֹוָ֔ה", but the oldest Greek text in Papyrus Fouad 266 has written πρὸς יהוה τὸν θεόν.

In the October 2011 Journal of Theological Studies, Brian J. Wright and Tim Ricchuiti reason that the indefinite article in the Coptic translation, of John 1:1, has a qualitative meaning. Many such occurrences for qualitative nouns are identified in the Coptic New Testament, including 1 John 1:5 and 1 John 4:8. Moreover, the indefinite article is used to refer to God in Deuteronomy 4:31 and Malachi 2:10.

== Debate on Article ==
The verse has been a source of much debate among Bible scholars and translators.

This verse and other concepts in the Johannine literature set the stage for the Logos-Christology in which the Apologists of the second and third centuries connected the divine Word of John 1:1-5 to the Hebrew Wisdom literature and to the divine Logos of contemporary Greek philosophy.

On the basis of John 1:1, Tertullian, early in the third century, argued for two Persons that are distinct but the substance is undivided, of the same substance.

In John 1:1c, logos has the article but theos does not. Origen of Alexandria, a teacher in Greek grammar of the third century, argued that John uses the article when theos refers to "the uncreated cause of all things." But the Logos is named theos without the article because He participates in the divinity of the Father because of "His being with the Father." Robert J. Wilkinson informs that Origen also "mentions the name Ιαω in his commentary on John 1:1, where in discussing divine names, he glosses ieremias as meteorismos Ιαω (exultation of Ιαω). This appears to be an entry from a list giving the meaning of Hebrew names in LXX".

The main dispute with respect to this verse relates to how to translate the Greek word "theos" in John 1:1c. One translation given by some academic scholars is "the Word was divine." This is based on the argument that the grammatical structure of the Greek does not identify the Word as the Person of God but indicates a qualitative sense.

So, whether the predicate (theos) is translated as definite, indefinite or qualitative rests on the historical and cultural context of the author's original work. Consequently, this article raises the concern that uncertainty with respect to the grammar may result in translations based on the theology of the translator rather than the intention of the original author. A translation that presupposes either a theology that Jesus is God or that Jesus is subordinate to God, may naturally lead to a corresponding mistranslation. But a translation rooted on the intellectual milieu in which the text was originally written and used will more likely lead to the proper rendering.

== Commentary from the Church Fathers ==
Thomas Aquinas assembled the following quotations regarding this verse from the early Fathers of the Church:

- Chrysostom: "While all the other Evangelists begin with the Incarnation, John, passing over the Conception, Nativity, education, and growth, speaks immediately of the Eternal Generation, saying, In the beginning was the Word."
- Augustine: "The Greek word "logos" signifies both Word and Reason. But in this passage it is better to interpret it [as] Word; as referring not only to the Father, but to the creation of things by the operative power of the Word; whereas Reason, though it produce nothing, is still rightly called Reason."
- Augustine: "Words by their daily use, sound, and passage out of us, have become common things. But there is a word which remaineth inward, in the very man himself; distinct from the sound which proceedeth out of the mouth. There is a word, which is truly and spiritually that, which you understand by the sound, not being the actual sound. Now whoever can conceive the notion of word, as existing not only before its sound, but even before the idea of its sound is formed, may see enigmatically, and as it were in a glass, some similitude of that Word of Which it is said, In the beginning was the Word. For when we give expression to something which we know, the word used is necessarily derived from the knowledge thus retained in the memory, and must be of the same quality with that knowledge. For a word is a thought formed from a thing which we know; which word is spoken in the heart, being neither Greek nor Latin, nor of any language, though, when we want to communicate it to others, some sign is assumed by which to express it. [...] Wherefore the word which sounds externally, is a sign of the word which lies hid within, to which the name of word more truly appertains. For that which is uttered by the mouth of our flesh, is the voice of the word; and is in fact called word, with reference to that from which it is taken, when it is developed externally."
- Basil of Caesarea: "This Word is not a human word. For how was there a human word in the beginning, when man received his being last of all? There was not then any word of man in the beginning, nor yet of Angels; for every creature is within the limits of time, having its beginning of existence from the Creator. But what says the Gospel? It calls the Only-Begotten Himself the Word."
- Chrysostom: "But why omitting the Father, does he proceed at once to speak of the Son? Because the Father was known to all; though not as the Father, yet as God; whereas the Only-Begotten was not known. As was meet then, he endeavours first of all to inculcate the knowledge of the Son on those who knew Him not; though neither in discoursing on Him, is he altogether silent on the Father. And inasmuch as he was about to teach that the Word was the Only-Begotten Son of God, that no one might think this a passible (παθητὴν) generation, he makes mention of the Word in the first place, in order to destroy the dangerous suspicion, and show that the Son was from God impassibly. And a second reason is, that He was to declare unto us the things of the Father. (John. 15:15) But he does not speak of the Word simply, but with the addition of the article, in order to distinguish It from other words. For Scripture calls God's laws and commandments words; but this Word is a certain Substance, or Person, an Essence, coming forth impassibly from the Father Himself."
- Basil of Caesarea: "Wherefore then Word? Because born impassibly, the Image of Him that begat, manifesting all the Father in Himself; abstracting from Him nothing, but existing perfect in Himself."
- Basil of Caesarea: "Yet has our outward word some similarity to the Divine Word. For our word declares the whole conception of the mind; since what we conceive in the mind we bring out in word. Indeed our heart is as it were the source, and the uttered word the stream which flows therefrom."
- Chrysostom: "Observe the spiritual wisdom of the Evangelist. He knew that men honoured most what was most ancient, and that honouring what is before everything else, they conceived of it as God. On this account he mentions first the beginning, saying, In the beginning was the Word."
- Augustine: "Or, In the beginning, as if it were said, before all things."
- Basil of Caesarea: "The Holy Ghost foresaw that men would arise, who should envy the glory of the Only-Begotten, subverting their hearers by sophistry; as if because He were begotten, He was not; and before He was begotten, He was not. That none might presume then to babble such things, the Holy Ghost saith, In the beginning was the Word."
- Hilary of Poitiers: "Years, centuries, ages, are passed over, place what beginning thou wilt in thy imagining, thou graspest it not in time, for He, from Whom it is derived, still was."
- Chrysostom: "As then when our ship is near shore, cities and port pass in survey before us, which on the open sea vanish, and leave nothing whereon to fix the eye; so the Evangelist here, taking us with him in his flight above the created world, leaves the eye to gaze in vacancy on an illimitable expanse. For the words, was in the beginning, are significative of eternal and infinite essence."
- Council of Ephesus: "Wherefore in one place divine Scripture calls Him the Son, in another the Word, in another the Brightness of the Father; names severally meant to guard against blasphemy. For, forasmuch as thy son is of the same nature with thyself, the Scripture wishing to show that the Substance of the Father and the Son is one, sets forth the Son of the Father, born of the Father, the Only-Begotten. Next, since the terms birth and son, convey the idea of passibleness, therefore it calls the Son the Word, declaring by that name the impassibility of His Nativity. But inasmuch as a father with us is necessarily older than his son, lest thou shouldest think that this applied to the Divine nature as well, it calls the Only-Begotten the Brightness of the Father; for brightness, though arising from the sun, is not posterior to it. Understand then that Brightness, as revealing the coeternity of the Son with the Father; Word as proving the impassibility of His birth, and Son as conveying His consubstantiality."
- Chrysostom: "But they say that In the beginning does not absolutely express eternity: for that the same is said of the heaven and the earth: In the beginning God made the heaven and the earth. (Gen. 1:1) But are not made and was, altogether different? For in like manner as the word is, when spoken of man, signifies the present only, but when applied to God, that which always and eternally is; so too was, predicated of our nature, signifies the past, but predicated of God, eternity."
- Origen: "The verb to be, has a double signification, sometimes expressing the motions which take place in time, as other verbs do; sometimes the substance of that one thing of which it is predicated, without reference to time. Hence it is also called a substantive verb."
- Hilary of Poitiers: "Consider then the world, understand what is written of it. In the beginning God made the heaven and the earth. Whatever therefore is created is made in the beginning, and thou wouldest contain in time, what, as being to be made, is contained in the beginning. But, lo, for me, an illiterate unlearned fisherman is independent of time, unconfined by ages, advanceth beyond all beginnings. For the Word was, what it is, and is not bounded by any time, nor commenced therein, seeing It was not made in the beginning, but was."
- Alcuin: "To refute those who inferred from Christ's Birth in time, that He had not been from everlasting, the Evangelist begins with the eternity of the Word, saying, In the beginning was the Word."
- Chrysostom: "Because it is an especial attribute of God, to be eternal and without a beginning, he laid this down first: then, lest any one on hearing in the beginning was the Word, should suppose the Word Unbegotten, he instantly guarded against this; saying, And the Word was with God."
- Hilary of Poitiers: "From the beginning, He is with God: and though independent of time, is not independent of an Author."
- Basil of Caesarea: "Again he repeats this, was, because of men blasphemously saying, that there was a time when He was not. Where then was the Word? Illimitable things are not contained in space. Where was He then? With God. For neither is the Father bounded by place, nor the Son by aught circumscribing."
- Origen: "It is worth while noting, that, whereas the Word is said to come [be made] to some, as to Hosea, Isaiah, Jeremiah, with God it is not made, as though it were not with Him before. But, the Word having been always with Him, it is said, and the Word was with God: for from the beginning it was not separate from the Father."
- Chrysostom: "He has not said, was in God, but was with God: exhibiting to us that eternity which He had in accordance with His Person."
- Theophylact of Ohrid: "Sabellius is overthrown by this text. For he asserts that the Father, Son, and Holy Ghost are one Person, Who sometimes appeared as the Father, sometimes as the Son, sometimes as the Holy Ghost. But he is manifestly confounded by this text, and the Word was with God; for here the Evangelist declares that the Son is one Person, God the Father another."
- Hilary of Poitiers: "But the title is absolute, and free from the offence of an extraneous subject. To Moses it is said, I have given thee for a god to Pharaoh: (Exod. 7:1) but is not the reason for the name added, when it is said, to Pharaoh? Moses is given for a god to Pharaoh, when he is feared, when he is entreated, when he punishes, when he heals. And it is one thing to be given for a God, another thing to be God. I remember too another application of the name in the Psalms, I have said, ye are gods. But there too it is implied that the title was but bestowed; and the introduction of, I said, makes it rather the phrase of the Speaker, than the name of the thing. But when I hear the Word was God, I not only hear the Word said to be, but perceive It proved to be, God."
- Basil of Caesarea: "Thus cutting off the cavils of blasphemers, and those who ask what the Word is, he replies, and the Word was God."
- Theophylact of Ohrid: "Or combine it thus. From the Word being with God, it follows plainly that there are two Persons. But these two are of one Nature; and therefore it proceeds, In the Word was God: to show that Father and Son are of One Nature, being of One Godhead."
- Origen: "We must add too, that the Word illuminates the Prophets with Divine wisdom, in that He cometh to them; but that with God He ever is, because He is God. For which reason he placed and the Word was with God, before and the Word was God."
- Chrysostom: "Not asserting, as Plato does, one to be intelligence, the other soul; for the Divine Nature is very different from this. [...] But you say, the Father is called God with the addition of the article, the Son without it. What say you then, when the Apostle writes, The great God and our Saviour Jesus Christ; (Tit. 2:13) and again, Who is over all, God; (Rom. 9:5) and Grace be unto you and peace from God our Father; (Rom. 1:7) without the article? Besides, too, it were superfluous here, to affix what had been affixed just before. So that it does not follow, though the article is not affixed to the Son, that He is therefore an inferior God.

== Sources ==
- Wilkinson, Robert J. (4 February 2015). Tetragrammaton: Western Christians and the Hebrew Name of God: From the Beginnings to the Seventeenth Century. Studies in the History of Christian Traditions. Vol. 179. Leiden: Brill. doi:10.1163/9789004288171. ISBN 978-90-04-28817-1. S2CID 161026434.
