= New Commandment =

Christian term

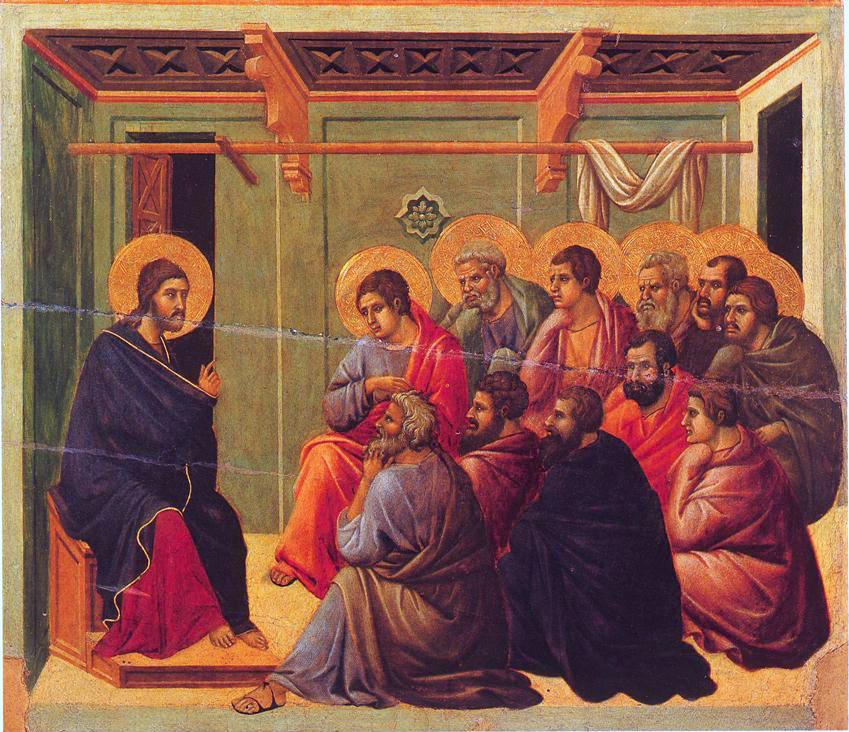
Jesus giving the Farewell Discourse to his eleven remaining disciples after the Last Supper, from the Maestà by Duccio, c. 1310

The New Commandment is a term used in Christianity to describe Jesus's commandment to "love one another" which, according to the Bible, was given as part of the final instructions to his disciples after the Last Supper had ended, and after Judas Iscariot had departed in John 13:34.

Little children, yet a little while I am with you. Ye shall seek me: and as I said unto the Jews, Whither I go, ye cannot come; so now I say to you. ^{34} A new commandment I give unto you, That ye love one another; as I have loved you, that ye also love one another. ^{35} By this shall all men know that ye are my disciples, if ye have love one to another. —John 13:33–35 (KJV; emphasis added)

This commandment appears thirteen times in twelve verses in the New Testament. Theologically, this commandment is interpreted as dual to the Love of Christ for his followers. The commandment can also be seen as the last wish in the Farewell Discourse to the disciples.

== Gospel of John ==
The statement of the new commandment by Jesus in John 13:34–35 was after the Last Supper, and after the departure of Judas. The commandment was prefaced in John 13:34 by Jesus telling his remaining disciples, as little children, that he will be with them for only a short time, then will leave them.

In the commandment Jesus told the disciples: "Love one another; as I have loved you".

Just after the commandment, and before the Farewell Discourse the first reference to Peter's Denials took place, where Jesus predicted that Peter would deny him three times before the cock crow.

Two similar statements also appear in chapter 15 of the Gospel of John:

- John 15:12: This is my commandment, that ye love one another, even as I have loved you.
- John 15:17: These things I command you, that ye may love one another.

== Other New Testament references ==
=== Johannine writings ===
The Johannine writings include other, similar passages.

- 1 John 3:11: For this is the message which ye heard from the beginning, that we should love one another
- 1 John 3:23: And this is his commandment, that we should believe in the name of his Son Jesus Christ, and love one another, even as he gave us commandment.
- 1 John 4:7: let us love one another: for love is of God;
- 1 John 4:12: No man hath beheld God at any time: if we love one another, God abideth in us, and his love is perfected in us.

Similarly, the Second Epistle of John states:

- 2 John 5: not as though I wrote to thee a new commandment, but that which we had from the beginning, that we love one another.

=== Pauline letters ===
The Pauline Epistles also contain similar references.

- Romans 13:8: Owe no man anything, save to love one another: for he that loveth his neighbor hath fulfilled the law.
- 1 Thessalonians 4:9: ... for ye yourselves are taught of God to love one another.

=== 1 Peter ===
The First Epistle of Peter has a similar statement:

- 1 Peter 1:22: ...to love brotherly without feigning, love one another with a pure heart fervently.

== Interpretations ==
The "New Commandment" concerns the love for neighbor and is similar to the second part of the Great Commandment, which comprises two commands: love for God and love for neighbor. The first part of the Great Commandment alludes to Deuteronomy 6:4–5, a section of the Torah which is recited at the beginning of the Jewish prayer known as Shema Yisrael. The second part of the Great Commandment, which is similar to the "New Commandment", commands love for neighbor and is based on Leviticus 19:18.

According to Scott Hahn, while the Torah commanded human love, Jesus commands divine love for one another that is modeled on his own acts of charity.

The "New Commandment", the Wycliffe Bible Commentary states, "was new in that the love was to be exercised toward others not because they belonged to the same nation, but because they belonged to Christ ... and the love of Christ which the disciples had seen ... would be a testimony to the world".

One of the novelties introduced by this commandment – perhaps justifying its designation as New – is that Jesus "introduces himself as a standard for love". The usual criterion had been "as you love yourself". However, the New Commandment goes beyond "as you love yourself" as found in the ethic of reciprocity and states "as I have loved you", using the Love of Christ for his disciples as the new model.

The First Epistle of John reflects the theme of love being an imitation of Christ, with 1 John 4:19 stating: "We love, because he first loved us."

== See also ==
- Great Commandment
- Love of Christ
- New Covenant
- Ten Commandments
- The Law of Christ
