= Logos (Christianity) =

Name or title of Jesus Christ

In Christianity, the Logos (Greek: o Λόγος, lit. 'the word, discourse, or reason') is a name or title of Jesus Christ, seen as the pre-existent second person of the Trinity. In the Douay–Rheims, King James, New International, and other versions of the Bible, the first verse of the Gospel of John reads:

In the beginning was the Word, and the Word was with God, and the Word was God.

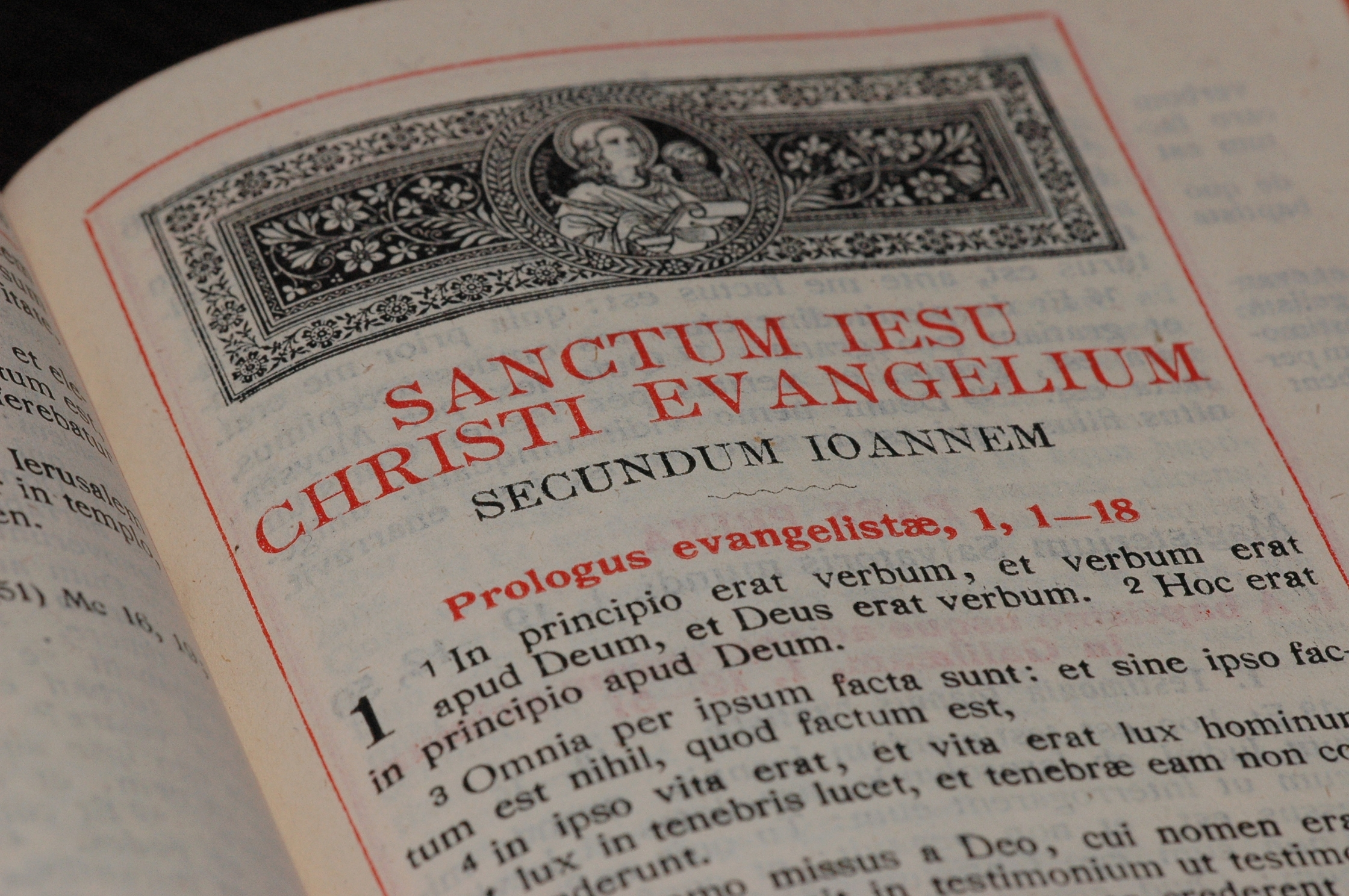
In principio erat verbum, Latin for In the beginning was the Word, from the Clementine Vulgate, Gospel of John, 1:1–18

In these translations, Word is used for Λόγος, although the term is often used transliterated but untranslated in theological discourse.

According to Irenaeus of Lyon (c. 130–202), a student of Polycarp (c. pre-69–156), John the Apostle wrote these words specifically to refute the teachings of Cerinthus, who both resided and taught at Ephesus, the city John settled in following his return from exile on Patmos. While Cerinthus claimed that the world was made by "a certain Power far separated from ... Almighty God", John, according to Irenaeus, by means of John 1:1-5, presented Almighty God as the Creator – "by His Word." And while Cerinthus made a distinction between the man Jesus and "the Christ from above", who descended on the man Jesus at his baptism, John, according to Irenaeus, presented the pre-existent Word and Jesus Christ as one and the same.

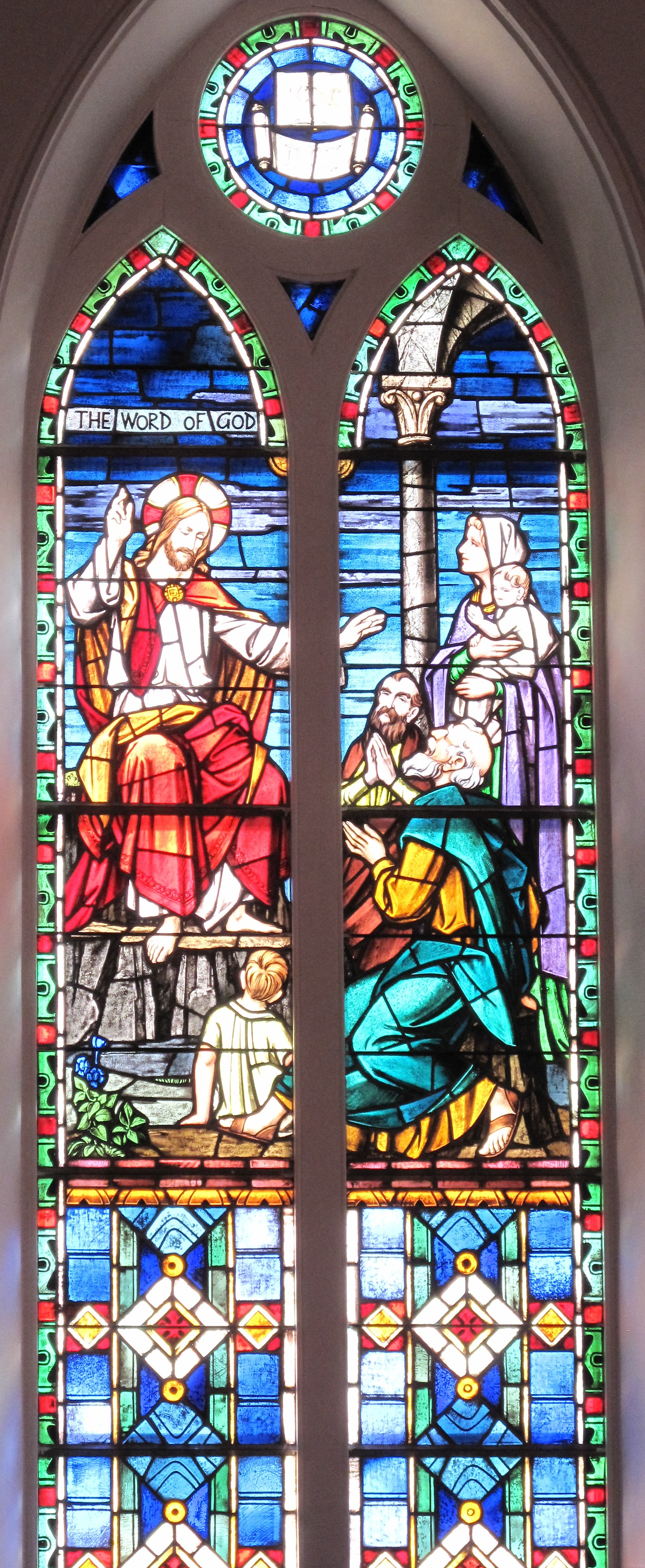
Word of God Window at St. Matthew's German Evangelical Lutheran Church in Charleston, South Carolina

A figure in the Book of Revelation is called "The Word of God", being followed by "the armies which are in heaven" (Rev 19:13–14).

== Bible ==
=== Johannine literature ===
Stephen L. Harris claims that John adapted Philo's concept of the Logos, identifying Jesus as an incarnation of the divine Logos that formed and governs the universe.

While John 1:1 (dated to 90-100 CE) is generally considered the first mention of the Logos in the New Testament, arguably, the first reference occurs in the Book of Revelation (dated to around 95 CE). In it the Logos is spoken of as "the Word of God", who at the Second Coming rides a white horse into the Battle of Armageddon wearing many crowns, and is identified as King of Kings, and Lord of Lords:

He is clothed with a robe dipped in blood, and His name is called The Word of God ... And on His robe and on His thigh He has a name written, "king of kings, and lord of lords".

John 1's subject is developed in the First Epistle of John (1 John). Similar to John 1:1-5, 1 John 1:1 also refers to the beginning (archē) and to the Word (ho lógos). 1 John 1 does not refer to the creation (see John 1:3) but expands on two other concepts found in John 1:4, namely that of life and of light (1 John 1:1–2, 5–7). It therefore seems as if only the first clause of 1 John 1:1 "What was from the beginning" refers to the pre-incarnate Word. The rest of 1 John 1 describes the incarnate Word:

That which was from the beginning, which we have heard, which we have seen with our eyes, which we have looked at and our hands have touched—this we proclaim concerning the Word of life.

— 1 John 1:1 (NIV)

=== Luke 1:1-2 ===
Like John 1:1-5, Luke 1:1-2 also refers to the beginning and to the word:

Luke 1:1-2 ... compile an account of the things accomplished among us, just as they were handed down to us by those who from the beginning (archē) were eyewitnesses and servants of the word (lógos).

— Luke 1:1-2 (NASB)

David Lyle Jeffrey and Leon Morris have seen in "the word" a reference to Jesus Christ. However, this reference did not depict the same significant theology of the Logos as depicted in the gospel of John. In context, it is referring to the gospel message about Jesus and his teaching, rather than his title or identity.

=== Septuagint ===
Certain references to the term logos in the Septuagint in Christian theology are taken as prefiguring New Testament usage such as Psalm 33:6, which relates directly to the Genesis creation narrative. (Note: 32:6 τῷ λόγῳ τοῦ κυρίου οἱ οὐρανοὶ ἐστερεώθησαν καὶ τῷ πνεύματι τοῦ στόματος αὐτοῦ πᾶσα ἡ δύναμις αὐτῶν) Theophilus of Antioch references the connection in To Autolycus 1:7.

Irenaeus of Lyon explained Psalm 33:6 as that the "One God, the Father, not made, invisible, creator of all things ... created the things that were made ... by [the] Word" and "adorned all things ... by [the] Spirit." He added, "fittingly is the Word called the Son, and the Spirit the Wisdom of God."

Origen of Alexandria likewise sees in it the operation of the Trinity, a mystery intimated beforehand by the Psalmist David. Augustine of Hippo considered that in Psalms 33:6 both logos and pneuma were "on the verge of being personified".

Τῷ Λόγῳ τοῦ Κυρίου οἱ Οὐρανοὶ ἐστερεώθησαν, καὶ τῷ Πνεύματι τοῦ στόματος αὐτοῦ πᾶσα ἡ δύναμις Αὐτῶν

By the Word (Lógo) of the Lord were the Heavens established, and all the host of them by the Spirit (Pnéumati) of His mouth

— Psalm 33:6

== Early Christianity ==
=== Ignatius of Antioch ===
The first extant Christian reference to the Logos found in writings outside of the New Testament belongs to John's disciple Ignatius (c. 35–108), Bishop of Antioch, who in his epistle to the Magnesians, writes, "there is one God, who has manifested Himself by Jesus Christ His Son, who is His eternal Word, not proceeding forth from silence," (i.e., there was not a time when he did not exist). In similar fashion, he speaks to the Ephesians of the son being "possessed both of flesh and spirit; both made and not made; God existing in flesh; true life in death; both of Mary and of God; first passible and then impassible".

=== Justin Martyr ===
Following John 1, the early Christian apologist Justin Martyr (c. 150) identifies Jesus as the Logos. Like Philo, Justin also identified the Logos with the Angel of the Lord, and he also identified the Logos with the many other theophanies of the Old Testament, and used this as a way of arguing for Christianity to Jews:

I shall give you another testimony, my friends, from the Scriptures, that God begot before all creatures a Beginning, [who was] a certain rational power [proceeding] from Himself, who is called by the Holy Spirit, now the Glory of the Lord, now the Son, again Wisdom, again an Angel, then God, and then Lord and Logos;

In his Dialogue with Trypho, Justin relates how Christians maintain that the Logos,

... is indivisible and inseparable from the Father, just as they say that the light of the sun on earth is indivisible and inseparable from the sun in the heavens; as when it sinks, the light sinks along with it; so the Father, when He chooses, say they, causes His power to spring forth, and when He chooses, He makes it return to Himself ... And that this power which the prophetic word calls God ... is not numbered [as different] in name only like the light of the sun but is indeed something numerically distinct, I have discussed briefly in what has gone before; when I asserted that this power was begotten from the Father, by His power and will, but not by abscission, as if the essence of the Father were divided; as all other things partitioned and divided are not the same after as before they were divided: and, for the sake of example, I took the case of fires kindled from a fire, which we see to be distinct from it, and yet that from which many can be kindled is by no means made less, but remains the same.

In his First Apology, Justin used the Stoic concept of the Logos to his advantage as a way of arguing for Christianity to non-Jews. Since a Greek audience would accept this concept, his argument could concentrate on identifying this Logos with Jesus.

=== Theophilus of Antioch ===
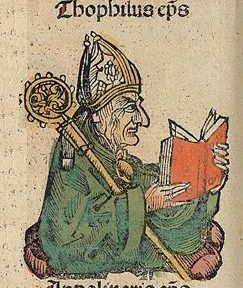
Theophilus of Antioch

Theophilus, the Patriarch of Antioch (died c. 180) in his Apology to Autolycus also identifies the Logos as the Son of God, who was at one time internal within the Father, but was begotten by the Father before creation:

And first, they taught us with one consent that God made all things out of nothing; for nothing was coeval with God: but He being His own place, and wanting nothing, and existing before the ages, willed to make man by whom He might be known; for him, therefore, He prepared the world. For he that is created is also needy; but he that is uncreated stands in need of nothing. God, then, having His own Word internal within His own bowels, begot Him, emitting Him along with His own wisdom before all things. He had this Word as a helper in the things that were created by Him, and by Him He made all things ... Not as the poets and writers of myths talk of the sons of gods begotten from intercourse [with women], but as truth expounds, the Word, that always exists, residing within the heart of God. For before anything came into being He had Him as a counsellor, being His own mind and thought. But when God wished to make all that He determined on, He begot this Word, uttered, the first-born of all creation, not Himself being emptied of the Word [Reason], but having begotten Reason, and always conversing with His Reason.

He sees in the text of Psalm 33:6 the operation of the Trinity, following the early practice as identifying the Holy Spirit as the Wisdom (sophía) of God (Note: His contemporary, Irenaeus of Lyon, citing this same passage, writes, By the word of the Lord were the heavens established, and by his spirit all their power. Since then the Word establishes, that is to say, gives body and grants the reality of being, and the Spirit gives order and form to the diversity of the powers; rightly and fittingly is the Word called the Son, and the Spirit the Wisdom of God. (Demonstration of the Apostolic Preaching, 5) This is in contrast with later Christian writings, where Wisdom came to be more prominently identified as the Son.) when he writes that "God by His own Word and Wisdom made all things; for by His Word were the heavens made, and all the host of them by the Spirit of His mouth" So he expresses in his second letter to Autolycus, "In like manner also the three days which were before the luminaries, are types of the Trinity, of God, and His Word, and His wisdom."

=== Athenagoras of Athens ===
By the third quarter of the second century, persecution had been waged against Christianity in many forms. Because of their denial of the Roman gods, and their refusal to participate in sacrifices of the Imperial cult, Christians were suffering persecution as "atheists". Therefore the early Christian apologist Athenagoras (c. 133 – c. 190), in his Embassy or Plea to the emperors Marcus Aurelius and his son Commodus in defense of Christianity (c. 176), makes an expression of the Christian faith against this claim. As a part of this defense, he articulates the doctrine of the Logos, expressing the paradox of the Logos being both the Son of God as well as God the Son, and of the Logos being both the Son of the Father as well as being one with the Father, saying,

Who, then, would not be astonished to hear men called atheists who speak of God the Father, and of God the Son, and of the Holy Spirit, and who declare both their power in union and their distinction in order? ... the Son of God is the Word [Logos] of the Father, in idea and in operation; for after the pattern of Him and by Him were all things made, the Father and the Son being one. And, the Son being in the Father and the Father in the Son, in oneness and power of spirit, the understanding [Nous] and reason [Logos] of the Father is the Son of God. But if, in your surpassing intelligence, it occurs to you to inquire what is meant by the Son, I will state briefly that He is the first product of the Father, not as having been brought into existence (for from the beginning, God, who is the eternal mind [Nous], had the Word in Himself, being from eternity rational [Logikos]; but inasmuch as He came forth to be the idea and energizing power of all material things, which lay like a nature without attributes, and an inactive earth, the grosser particles being mixed up with the lighter...

Athenagoras further appeals to the joint rule of the Roman emperor with his son Commodus, as an illustration of the Father and the Word, his Son, to whom he maintains all things are subjected, saying,

For as all things are subservient to you, father and son, who have received the kingdom from above (for "the king's soul is in the hand of God," says the prophetic Spirit), so to the one God and the Word proceeding from Him, the Son, apprehended by us as inseparable from Him, all things are in like manner subjected.

In this defense he uses terminology common with the philosophies of his day (Nous, Logos, Logikos, Sophia) as a means of making the Christian doctrine relatable to the philosophies of his day.

=== Irenaeus of Lyon ===
Irenaeus (c. 130–202), a student of the Apostle John's disciple, Polycarp, identifies the Logos as Jesus, by whom all things were made, and who before his incarnation appeared to men in the theophany, conversing with the pre-Mosaic Patriarchs, with Moses at the burning bush, with Abraham at Mamre, and elsewhere, manifesting to them the unseen things of the Father. After these things, the Logos became man and suffered the death of the cross. In his Demonstration of the Apostolic Preaching, Irenaeus defines the second point of the faith, after the Father, as this:

The Word of God, Son of God, Christ Jesus our Lord, who was manifested to the prophets according to the form of their prophesying and according to the method of the dispensation of the Father: through whom all things were made; who also at the end of the times, to complete and gather up all things, was made man among men, visible and tangible, in order to abolish death and show forth life and produce a community of union between God and man.

Irenaeus writes that Logos is and always has been the Son, is uncreated, eternally-coexistent and one with the Father, to whom the Father spoke at creation saying, "Let us make man." As such he distinguishes between creature and creator, so that

He indeed who made all things can alone, together with His Word, properly be termed God and Lord: but the things which have been made cannot have this term applied to them, neither should they justly assume that appellation which belongs to the Creator.

Again, in his fourth book against heresies, after identifying Christ as the Word, who spoke to Moses at the burning bush, he writes, "Christ Himself, therefore, together with the Father, is the God of the living, who spoke to Moses, and who was manifested to the fathers."

According to Irenaeus, John wrote John 1:1-5 to refute errors proclaimed by Cerinthus. The latter taught "that the world was not made by the primary God, but by a certain Power far separated from him. ... He represented Jesus as having not been born of a virgin, but as being the son of Joseph and Mary according to the ordinary course of human generation." Furthermore, Cerinthus made a distinction between "Jesus, the Son of the Creator" and "the Christ from above" and said that "after [Jesus'] baptism, Christ descended upon him in the form of a dove from the Supreme Ruler." But, after "Christ departed from Jesus ... Jesus suffered and rose again."

Irenaeus wrote that John wrote these verses to refute these errors and to state:

"That there is one Almighty God, who made all things by His Word," and "That by the Word, through whom God made the creation, He also bestowed salvation on the men."

Therefore, while Cerinthus claimed that the world was made by "a certain Power far separated from" an almighty God, John, according to Irenaeus, by means of John 1:1-5, presented Almighty God as the Creator – "by His Word." And while Cerinthus made a distinction between the man Jesus and "the Christ from above," who descended on the man Jesus at his baptism, John, according to Irenaeus, presented the pre-existent Word and Jesus Christ as one and the same.

=== Alexandria ===
The mixing of Egyptian pagan and Christian thought was characteristic of Alexandrian learning and featured in the works of Cyril of Alexandria and Didymus the Blind.

In the Holy Book of the Great Invisible Spirit (also known as the Gospel of the Egyptians), a text from early Christian Gnosticism, the Logos appears as a divine emanation or aeon of the great spirit or Monad and mingles with the primordial Adam.

== Post-Nicene Christianity ==
The First Council of Constantinople of 381 decreed that the Logos is God, begotten and therefore distinguishable from the Father, but, being God, of the same substance (essence).

Photinus denied that the Logos as the Wisdom of God had an existence of its own before the birth of Christ.

Post-apostolic Christian writers struggled with the question of the identity of Jesus and the Logos, but the Church's doctrine never changed its claim that Jesus was the Logos. Each of the first six ecumenical councils defined Jesus Christ as fully God and fully human, from the First Council of Nicea (325) to the Third Council of Constantinople (680–681). Christianity did not accept the Platonic argument that the spirit is good and the flesh is evil, and that therefore the man Jesus could not be God. Neither did it accept any of the Platonic beliefs that would have made Jesus something less than fully God and fully human at the same time. The original teaching of John's gospel is, "In the beginning was the Logos, and the Logos was with God, and the Logos was God. ... And the Logos became flesh and dwelt among us." The final Christology of Chalcedon (confirmed by the Third Council of Constantinople) was that Jesus Christ is both God and man, and that these two natures are inseparable, indivisible, unconfused, and unchangeable.

== Modern references ==
On April 1, 2005, Cardinal Joseph Ratzinger (who became Pope Benedict XVI just over two weeks later) referred to the Christian religion as the religion of the Logos:

Christianity must always remember that it is the religion of the "Logos". It is faith in the "Creator Spiritus", in the Creator Spirit, from which proceeds everything that exists. Today, this should be precisely its philosophical strength, in so far as the problem is whether the world comes from the irrational, and reason is not, therefore, other than a "sub-product", on occasion even harmful of its development or whether the world comes from reason, and is, as a consequence, its criterion and goal. The Christian faith inclines toward this second thesis, thus having, from the purely philosophical point of view, really good cards to play, despite the fact that many today consider only the first thesis as the only modern and rational one par excellence. However, a reason that springs from the irrational, and that is, in the final analysis, itself irrational, does not constitute a solution for our problems. Only creative reason, which in the crucified God is manifested as love, can really show us the way. In the so necessary dialogue between secularists and Catholics, we Christians must be very careful to remain faithful to this fundamental line: to live a faith that comes from the "Logos", from creative reason, and that, because of this, is also open to all that is truly rational.

Catholics may use Logos to refer to the moral law written in human hearts. This meaning comes from Jeremiah 31:33 (prophecy of new covenant): "I will write my law on their hearts." Saint Justin wrote that those who have not accepted Christ but follow the moral law of their hearts (Logos) follow God, because it is God who has written the moral law in each person's heart. Although man may not explicitly recognize God, he has the spirit of Christ if he follows Jesus' moral laws, written in his heart.

Michael Heller has argued "that Christ is the logos implies that God's immanence in the world is his rationality".

== Nontrinitarianism ==
For Fausto Sozzini, Christ was the Logos, but he denied his pre-existence; He was the Word of God as being His Interpreter (Latin: interpres divinae voluntatis). Nathaniel Lardner and Joseph Priestley considered the Logos a personification of God's wisdom.

The controversial Anglican bishop Robert Clayton (d. 1758) proposed that Michael was the Logos and Gabriel the Holy Spirit. Controversy over Clayton's views led the government to order his prosecution, but he died before his scheduled examination.

== Translation ==
The Koine Greek term logos is translated in the Vulgate with the Latin verbum. Both logos and verbum are used to translate דבר (dabar) in the Hebrew Bible.

The translation of the last four words of John 1:1 (θεὸς ἦν ὁ λόγος) has been a particular topic of debate in Western Christianity in the modern period. The debate mostly centers over the usage of the article ὁ within the clause, where some have argued that the absence of the article before θεός ('God') makes it indefinite and should therefore result in the translation, "and the Word was a god". This translation can be found in the New World Translation of the Jehovah's Witnesses, and the Unitarian Thomas Belsham's 1808 revision of William Newcome's translation. (Note: For problems with this translation, see Bruce M. Metzger, "The Jehovah's Witnesses and Jesus Christ: A Biblical and Theological Appraisal", Theology Today 10/1 (April 1953), pp. 65–85.) Greek scholars such as Jason BeDuhn have also argued against the traditional translation, going as far as to state that:

Grammatically, John 1:1 is not a difficult verse to translate. It follows familiar, ordinary structures of Greek expression. A lexical (interlinear) translation of the controversial clause would read: "And a god was the Word." A minimal literal (formal equivalence) translation would rearrange the word order to match proper English expression: "And the Word was a god." The preponderance of evidence, from Greek grammar, from literary context, and from cultural environment, supports this translation, of which "the Word was divine" would be a slightly more polished variant carrying the same basic meaning. Both of these renderings are superior to the traditional translation which goes against these three key factors that guide accurate translation. The NASB, NIV, NRSV, and NAB follow the translation concocted by the KJV translators. This translation awaits a proper defense, since no obvious one emerges from Greek grammar, the literary context of John, or the cultural environment in which John is writing. (Jason BeDuhn, Truth in translation)

Others, ignoring the function of the article altogether, have proposed the translation, "and God was the Word", confusing subject and predicate. Colwell's rule dictates that in this construct, involving an equative verb as well as a predicate nominative in the emphatic position, the article serves to distinguish subject (the Word) from the predicate (God). In such a construction, the predicate, being in the emphatic position, is not to be considered indefinite. Therefore, the most common English translation is, "the Word was God", although even more emphatic translations such as "the Word was God Himself" (Amplified Bible) or "the Word ... was truly God" (Contemporary English Version) also exist. According to the Eastern/Greek Orthodox Bible translation, "and the Word was [what] God [was]", the footnote for this verse explains the difficulty:

This second theos could also be translated 'divine' as the construction indicates "a qualitative sense for theos". The Word is not God in the sense that he is the same person as the theos mentioned in 1:1a; he is not God the Father (God absolutely as in common NT usage) or the Trinity. The point being made is that the Logos is of the same uncreated nature or essence as God the Father, with whom he eternally exists. This verse is echoed in the Nicene Creed: "God (qualitative or derivative) from God (personal, the Father), Light from Light, True God from True God ... homoousion with the Father."

Although word is the most common translation of the noun logos, other less accepted translations have been used, which have more or less fallen by the grammatical wayside as understanding of the Greek language has increased in the Western world. Gordon Clark (1902–1985), for instance, a Calvinist theologian and expert on pre-Socratic philosophy, famously translated logos as 'logic': "In the beginning was the Logic, and the Logic was with God and the Logic was God." He meant to imply by this translation that the laws of logic were derived from God and formed part of creation, and were therefore not a secular principle imposed on the Christian world view.

Some other translations, such as An American Translation (1935) and Moffatt, New Translation, render it as "the Word was divine".

The question of how to translate Logos is also treated in Goethe's Faust, with lead character Heinrich Faust finally opting for die Tat, ('deed' or 'action'). This interpretation owes itself to the Hebrew דָּבָר (dabar), which not only means 'word', but can also be understood as a deed or thing accomplished: that is, "the word is the highest and noblest function of man and is, for that reason, identical with his action. 'Word' and 'Deed' are thus not two different meanings of dabar, but the 'deed' is the consequence of the basic meaning inherent in dabar."

The concept of Logos also appears in the Targums (Aramaic translations of the Hebrew Bible dating to the first centuries AD), where the term memra (Aramaic for 'word') is often used instead of 'the Lord', especially when referring to a manifestation of God that could be construed as anthropomorphic.

== See also ==
- In the beginning (phrase)
- Knowledge of Christ
- Last Adam
- Monophysitism
- Perfection of Christ
- Pre-existence of Christ
- Pseudo-Dionysius
