= Kenneth Wuest =

Evangelical Biblical Greek New Testament scholar

Kenneth Samuel Wuest
- Born: 1893; Chicago, IL
- Died: December 27, 1961 (aged 67–68)
- Occupation: Biblical Greek New Testament scholar
- Spouse: Jeannette Irene Scholl

Academic background
- Education: Northwestern University

Academic work
- Discipline: Biblical studies
- Notable works: Wuest's Expanded Translation of the New Testament

Kenneth Samuel Wuest (1893 – December 27, 1961) was an Evangelical Biblical Greek New Testament scholar of the mid-twentieth century.

== Early life and education ==
Wuest was born in 1893 on the north side of Chicago, where he lived for most of his life. He earned his A.B. in History and Greek from Northwestern University (1922), graduated from Moody Bible Institute (1924), and was awarded an honorary D.D. from Wheaton College (1955). He married his Moody Bible Institute classmate Jeannette Irene Scholl in 1924.

== Career ==
Wuest taught for one year starting in 1924 at the Freewill Baptist Seminary in Ayden, North Carolina, then for several years starting in 1925 at the Brookes Bible Institute in St. Louis, Missouri, before joining the faculty of Moody Bible Institute in 1929, where he served as professor of New Testament Greek. Over the next few decades, he published more than a dozen books on the New Testament. Wuest has been cited as an influential Dispensationalist scholar.

Wuest is credited as one of the translators of the original New American Standard Bible (NASB). He later went on to produce his own English translation of the New Testament, the Wuest Expanded Translation (WET), based on Nestle's critical text. In his translation of the New Testament, Wuest attempts to make the original Greek more accessible to the lay reader by drawing out (in translation) the full variety of possible meanings and translations of the underlying Greek words.

Wuest joined the Evangelical Theological Society in 1957, and retired from teaching in 1958, but continued his writing and lecturing until his death on December 27, 1961.

== Publications ==
The Library of Congress lists the following published works for Kenneth Samuel Wuest:

- Wuest, Kenneth S. (1940). Bypaths in the Greek New Testament for the English Reader.
- ——— (1941). Treasures from the Greek New Testament for the English Reader.
- ——— (1942). First Peter in the Greek New Testament for the English Reader.
- ——— (1942). Untranslatable Riches from the Greek New Testament for the English Reader.
- ——— (1942). Philippians in the Greek New Testament for the English Reader.
- ——— (1945). Studies in the Vocabulary of the Greek New Testament for the English Reader.
- ——— (1946). The Practical Use of the Greek New Testament.
- ——— (1947). Hebrews in the Greek New Testament, for the English Reader.
- ——— (1950). Mark in the Greek New Testament for the English Reader.
- ——— (1952). The Pastoral Epistles in the Greek New Testament for the English Reader.
- ——— (1952). Great Truths to Live By from the Greek New Testament for the English Reader.
- ——— (1953). Ephesians and Colossians in the Greek New Testament for the English Reader.
- ——— (1954). In These Last Days: II Peter, I, II, III John, and Jude in the Greek New Testament for the English Reader.
- ——— (1955). Romans in the Greek New Testament for the English Reader.
- ——— (1955). Prophetic Light in the Present Darkness.
