= Imitation of Christ =

Practice of following the example of Jesus

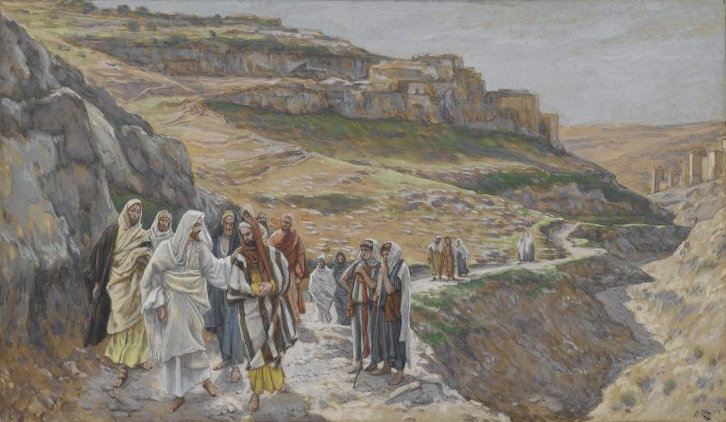
Jesus Discourses with His Disciples, James Tissot, c. 1890

In Christian theology, the imitation of Christ is the practice of following the example of Jesus. In Eastern Christianity, the term life in Christ is sometimes used for the same concept.

The ideal of the imitation of Christ has been an important element of both Christian ethics and spirituality. References to this concept and its practice are found in the earliest Christian documents, e.g. the Pauline Epistles.

Saint Augustine viewed the imitation of Christ as the fundamental purpose of Christian life, and as a remedy for the imitation of the sins of Adam. Saint Francis of Assisi believed in the physical as well as the spiritual imitation of Christ, and advocated a path of poverty and preaching like Jesus who was poor at birth in the manger and died naked on the cross. Thomas à Kempis, on the other hand, presented a path to The Imitation of Christ based on a focus on the interior life and withdrawal from the world.

The theme of imitation of Christ existed in all phases of Byzantine theology, and in the 14th-century book Life in Christ Nicholas Cabasilas viewed "living one's own personal life" in Christ as the fundamental Christian virtue.

== Early period ==
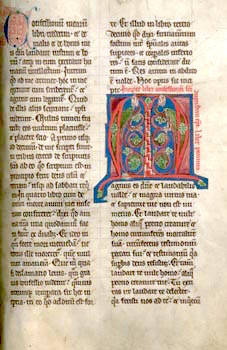
13th-century copy of Confessions of Augustine, Book 7

Why art thou proud, O man? God for thee became low. Thou wouldst perhaps be ashamed to imitate a lowly man; then at least imitate the lowly God.

— Saint Augustine, In Iohannis evangelium, tractatus 25, 16

The word imitate does not appear in the canonical gospels, but the word follow is often applied to those who believed in Jesus, and Jesus is quoted as requiring imitation in some form (Matthew 10:38; 16:24; Luke 14:27). But in 1 Thessalonians 1:6 Paul the Apostle refers to the imitation of Christ, as well as himself, and states: "And ye became imitators of us, and of the Lord, having received the word in much affliction, with joy of the Holy Spirit". Similarly, in 1 Peter 2:21, the Apostle Peter explains the duty of Christians to "follow his [Christ's] steps".

For Paul the imitation of Christ involves readiness to be shaped by the Holy Spirit as in Romans 8:4 and Romans 8:11, and a self-giving service of love to others as in 1 Corinthians 13 and Galatians 5:13. The imitation of Christ, as in Ephesians 5:1 is then viewed by Paul as a path to the imitation of God: "Be ye therefore imitators of God, as beloved children, and walk in love, even as Christ also loved you".

The earliest concepts of imitation focused on the works of the Holy Spirit, self-sacrifice and martyrdom. In time, this focus changed, and by the time of Saint Francis of Assisi attempts at literal imitation of Christ were well established.

By the 4th century, the ideal of the imitation of Christ was well accepted and for Saint Augustine, it was the ultimate goal of conversion, and the fundamental purpose of Christian life.

Book 7 of the Confessions of St. Augustine includes a well known passage on "at least imitate the lowly God" that confirms the strong Christian tradition of the imitation of Christ around the year 400. Augustine viewed human beings as creatures who approach the Holy Trinity through likeness, i.e. by imitating the Son, who is bound to the Father through the grace of the Holy Spirit. Thus for Augustine, the imitation of Christ is enabled by the Spirit who confers God's grace. Augustine viewed Christ as both a sign of grace and an example to be followed, and in his later writings stated that the imitation of Christ leads to a mystical union with him.

== Middle Ages ==
The 895 Council of Tribur considered triple immersion in baptism as an imitation of the three days of Jesus in the tomb, and the rising from the water as an imitation of the Resurrection of Jesus. This period also witnessed a growing trend towards the denial of the flesh in favor of the soul among the monastic communities, who saw the rebuffing of the physical body (as an imitation of the sufferings of Christ) as a path to a higher level of spiritual achievement.

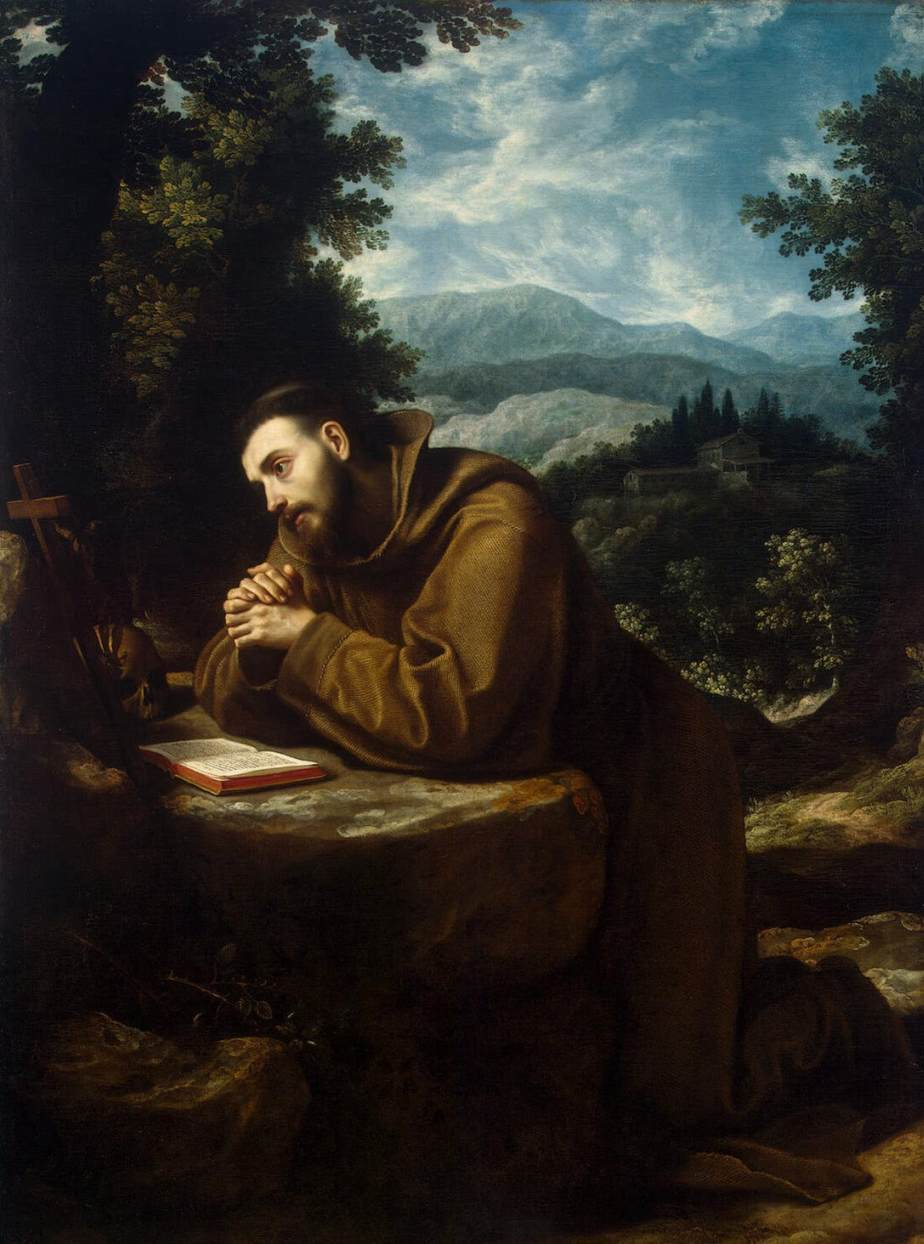
Saint Francis considered his stigmata part of the physical "imitation of Christ".

In the 12th century, Saint Bernard of Clairvaux considered humility and love as key examples of the imitation of Christ. Bernard argued that the Father sent his Son, who in turn sent the Spirit to the Church, and that those who, in imitation of Christ, humble themselves and serve the Church will obtain intimate union with God.

Early in the 13th century, groups of mendicant friars entered the scene, aiming to imitate Christ by living a life of poverty as well as preaching, as Jesus had done, and following him to martyrdom, if necessary. Chief among these were the followers of Saint Francis of Assisi, who believed in the physical as well as the spiritual imitation of Christ. Francis viewed poverty as a key element of the imitation of Christ who was "poor at birth in the manger, poor as he lived in the world, and naked as he died on the cross". Francis also drew attention to the poverty of the Virgin Mary, and viewed that as a noble imitation. He was also the first reported case of stigmata in the history of Christianity, and reportedly viewed his stigmata as a key element of his imitation of Christ.

Later in the 13th century, Saint Thomas Aquinas (who advocated the perfection of Christ) considered imitation of Christ essential for a religious life. In Summa Theologica 2.2.186.5, Aquinas stated that "Religious perfection consists chiefly in the imitation of Christ" and in 3.65.2 he positioned the "perfection of the spiritual life" as an imitation of Christ, with baptism as the first step in the path towards the imitation of a perfect Christ.

The theme of imitation of Christ continued to exist in all phases of Byzantine theology, although some Eastern theologians such as Nicholas Cabasilas preferred to use the term "Life in Christ", as in his 14th-century book of the same title. Cabasilas advocated "living one's own personal life" in Christ as a fundamental Christian virtue. Cabasilas also believed that the Eucharist forms the new life in Christ.

In the highly influential book The Imitation of Christ first issued in 1418, Thomas à Kempis provided specific instructions for imitating Christ. His book is perhaps the most widely read Christian devotional work after the Bible. The approach taken by Kempis is characterized by its emphasis on the interior life and withdrawal from the world, as opposed to an active imitation of Christ (including outward preaching) by other friars. The book places a high level of emphasis on the devotion to the Eucharist as key element of spiritual life.

== Reformation ==
The Reformation saw a multi-directional shift in focus on the concept of imitation. In the 16th century, Martin Luther initially made the connection between baptism and imitation even stronger. But in time Luther came to dislike the term imitation, and preferred the term "conformation", seeing imitation as an attempt to conceal a doctrine on the "works of Christ". However John Calvin gave a prominent place to the imitation of Christ in his writings and worked out the ideal of a "mystical union" with Christ in a way that resonated with the New Testament.

But the 16th century also witnessed a continuing interest in the imitation of Christ. Saint Ignatius of Loyola continued to advocate the path towards imitation and encouraged a sense of "being with Christ" and experiencing his humanity, e.g. in his Spiritual Exercises he asks the participant to imagine being in Calvary at the foot of the Cross, communing with Jesus on the Cross.

== Christology ==
The concept of the imitation of Christ has had a Christological context and implications from the very early days of formalized Christian theology. In the context of the Person of Christ, the belief in Monophysitism, which asserted only one divine nature for Christ with no human nature ran against the ideal that humans could imitate him. Those issues were mostly resolved, however, as Monophysitism was declared heretical by the Western Church and much of the Eastern Church.

The acceptance of a human (as well as a divine) nature for Christ by many Christians allowed the pursuit of the goal of the imitation of Christ, but with the realizations that it had inherent limits, e.g. that Christ's death in obedience to the will of the Father had a redemptive value beyond human potential.

While Western Christology of the "imitation of Christ" has had a focus on the sacrifice at Calvary, that has not been the main theme in the Eastern Church where the term "life in Christ" has been used and the key focus has been the Transfiguration of Jesus. No saints in the Eastern Church have reported signs of stigmata, but saints in the Eastern Church have frequently reported being transformed by the "inward light" of uncreated grace.

A further Christological issue that differentiates the Eastern and Western approaches is that the Eastern approach sees the Father as the sole hypostatic source of the Holy Spirit. Thus in contrast to Augustine and Aquinas, Eastern Christology does not see the Holy Spirit as the bond of love between the Father and the Son and hence the imitation of the Son does not have the same implications in terms of a unity with the Father.

== See also ==
- The Imitation of Christ
- Affective meditation
- Intercession of Christ
- Knowledge of Christ
- Vita Christi
- What would Jesus do?
