= Wuest Expanded Translation =

Translation of the New Testament

The Wuest Expanded Translation (born in 1893 Professor Kenneth S. Wuest) is a literal New Testament translation that follows the word order in the Greek quite strictly. The first printing was October 1961. It was reprinted April 1983.

For example, John 1:1–3 reads:

In the beginning the Word was existing. And the Word was in fellowship with God the Father. And the Word was as to His essence absolute deity. This Word was in the beginning in fellowship with God the Father. All things through His intermediate agency came into being, and without Him there came into being not even one thing which has come into existence.
