= Perfection of Christ =

Assertion that Christ's human attributes exemplified perfection in every possible sense

The perfection of Christ is a principle in Christology which asserts that Christ's human attributes exemplified perfection in every possible sense. Another perspective characterizes Christ's perfection as purely spiritual and moral, while his humanistic traits are subject to flaw, potential, and improvement as part of the current human condition.

Apostle Paul's perspective on Christ as the "perfect man" considered him the "second Adam" who brought forth life, while Adam left a legacy of sin, e.g. in 1 Corinthians 15:22 (NIV) and Romans 5:12 (NIV) In Ephesians 4:13, the Christian community is called to the "unity of faith, and of the knowledge of the Son of God, unto a perfect man, unto the measure of the age of the fullness of Christ," hence reaching its perfection in the perfection of Christ himself.

In the 2nd century, Saint Irenaeus of Lyons based his concept of the perfection of Christ on the Gospel of John (as well as the other Synoptic Gospels) rather than on the Pauline Epistles. For Irenaeus the perfection of Christ originates from his being "The Word", i.e. the Logos which pre-existed as Christ in perfect form, untouched by sin: because he was the first, he could achieve perfection.

In the 3rd century, Tertullian emphasized the perfection of Christ as a key consequence of the Incarnation of the Logos in Christ. In Tertullian's view to suggest that anything could be added to improve Christ would be to deny the Gospels.

In the Middle Ages, a key focus of Christological studies on the knowledge of Christ was his perfection as in John 1:14 (NIV) which states "full of grace and truth". In the 13th century, the perfection of Christ was subject to detailed theological analysis by Saint Thomas Aquinas in his Summa Theologiae.

John Calvin considered the perfection of Christ as a source of grace which covered the blemishes of sin in others.

In its document Gaudium et Spes, the Second Vatican Council teaches that:

Adam, the first man, was a figure of Him Who was to come, namely Christ the Lord. Christ, the final Adam, by the revelation of the mystery of the Father and His love, fully reveals man to man himself and makes his supreme calling clear. It is not surprising, then, that in Him all the aforementioned truths find their root and attain their crown.

The Council goes on to explain the concept of Christ's human perfection, which is based in the union between his human and divine nature:

He Who is "the image of the invisible God" (Col. 1:15, cf. 2 Cor. 4:4), is Himself the perfect man. To the sons of Adam He restores the divine likeness which had been disfigured from the first sin onward. Since human nature as He assumed it was not annulled, by that very fact it has been raised up to a divine dignity in our respect too. For by His incarnation the Son of God has united Himself in some fashion with every man. He worked with human hands, He thought with a human mind, acted by human choice and loved with a human heart. Born of the Virgin Mary, He has truly been made one of us, like us in all things except sin (cf. Hebr. 4:15).

The Council resumes this idea in a later section when emphasizing the culmination of history in God's love, in which human perfection is found:

For God's Word, through Whom all things were made, was Himself made flesh and dwelt on the earth of men. Thus He entered the world's history as a perfect man, taking that history up into Himself and summarizing it. He Himself revealed to us that "God is love" (1 John 4:8) and at the same time taught us that the new command of love was the basic law of human perfection and hence of the world’s transformation.

== See also ==
- Active obedience of Christ
- Christology
- Exorcism of the Syrophoenician woman's daughter
- Imparted righteousness
- Knowledge of Christ
- Person of Christ
- Intercession of Christ
- Ismah
