= Bereshit =

Bereshit or Bereishith (Biblical Hebrew: בְּרֵאשִׁית Bərēʾšīṯ) may refer to:

- In the beginning (phrase)
- Book of Genesis
- Bereshit (parashah), the first weekly Torah portion in the annual Jewish cycle of Torah reading
- Beresheet and Beresheet 2, both lunar landers by SpaceIL
- "Bereishit", a song by Blue Fringe
- "Berashith", a 1902 essay by Aleister Crowley

== See also ==
- Bereshit Rabbah, the midrash about the Book of Genesis
- Maaseh Breishit and Maaseh Merkavah, the esoteric doctrine of the universe or parts of it
