= In the beginning (phrase) =

Incipit used in Genesis 1:1

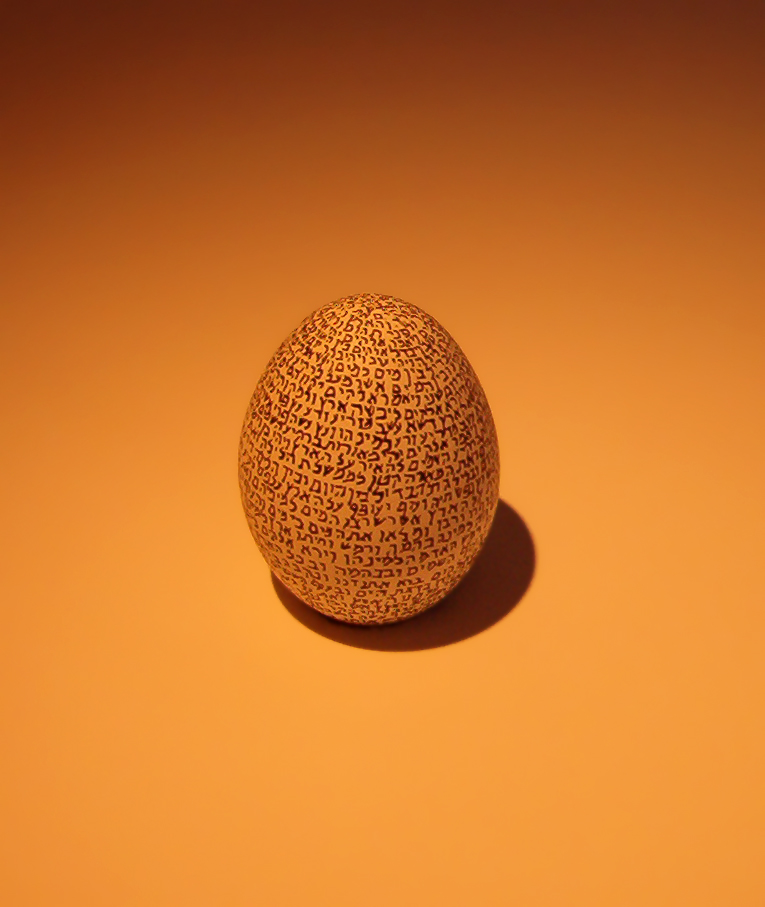
Genesis 1 written on an egg, in the Jerusalem museum

"In the beginning" (Hebrew: בְּרֵאשִׁית; Ancient Greek: ΕΝ ἀρχῇ; Latin: In principio) is the traditional translation of the opening-phrase or incipit "bereshit" in Biblical Hebrew used in the Bible in Genesis 1:1. In John 1:1 of the New Testament, the word Archē is translated into English with the same phrase.

== Etymology ==
The mimetic translation of the word bǝrēʾšît (בְּרֵאשִׁית) in the Hebrew Bible is: 'In beginning'. The word is made of two parts, bǝ (a prepositional suffix) and rēʾšît (a noun). As a result, this forms part of a genitive phrase, leading to a linguistic and exegetical translation of this word being 'In the beginning of...'. More accurately, the Hebrew word for "In the beginning,", the non-genitive phrase, would be "barēʾšît".

The traditional translation of the word bǝrēʾšît as "In the beginning," has been disputed. There is debate on whether, despite its traditional translation as "in the beginning", it was originally intended to be read that way. Joseph Blenkinsopp argues that a more functional equivalent English translation of the first three words of Genesis 1:1 is: "When God began to create...". Thomas Römer, Administrator and theological professor at the Collège de France, says that according to the Masoretes, in the written tradition bǝrēʾšît is "a beginning" among other possible ones and not the absolute Beginning. Other scholars, such as John Day and Benjamin Kantor, support the traditional translation of bǝrēʾšît as "In the beginning".

Archē (Ancient Greek: ἀρχή) is the original word used in the Septuagint translation of Genesis 1:1 and in John 1:1.

== Usage ==
The Hebrew Bible uses the word bǝrēʾšît on 5 occasions, in Genesis 1:1 and Jeremiah 26:1, 27:1, 28:1 and 49:34. All uses in Jeremiah refer to the beginning of the reign of various kings, translated to: "In the beginning of the reign of...".

The King James Version translates John 1:1a as "In the beginning was the Word".

The Enuma Elish begins with a similar descriptor, which sets the start of the story as taking place in the beginning of the formation of the world: "When on high the heavens had not been named, firm ground below had not been called by name...".

== Tradition and theology ==
=== In Judaism ===
The Book of Genesis as a whole has the title of Bereshit (בְּרֵאשִׁית) by its incipit in Hebrew, as with other books of the Hebrew Bible. The first word, and thus God's role as Creator, is recited in the Aleinu prayer near the end of each of the three daily prayer-services.

=== In Christianity ===
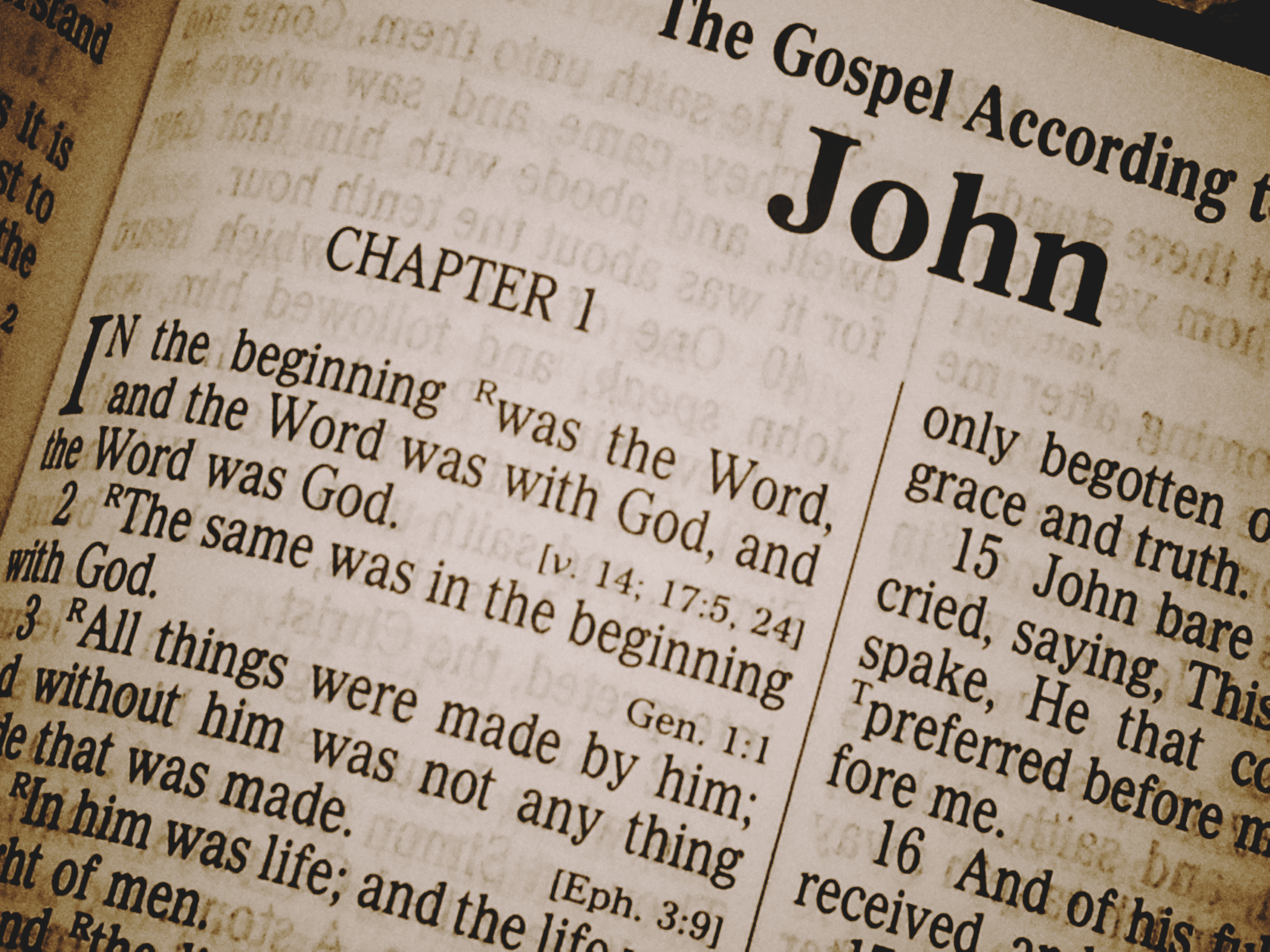
John 1:1 in King James Bible

Genesis 1:1 is commonly paralleled by Christian theologians with John 1:1 as something that the author alluded to. Theologian Charles Ellicott wrote:

The reference to the opening words of the Old Testament is obvious, and is the more striking when we remember that a Jew would constantly speak of and quote from the book of Genesis as "Berēshîth" ("in the beginning"). It is quite in harmony with the Hebrew tone of this Gospel to do so, and it can hardly be that St. John wrote his Berēshîth without having that of Moses present to his mind, and without being guided by its meaning.

== See also ==
- Bereshit (disambiguation)

== Sources ==
- Blenkinsopp, Joseph (2011). Creation, Un-Creation, Re-Creation: A Discursive Commentary on Genesis 1–11. T&T Clark International. ISBN 9780567372871.
- Day, John (2021). From Creation to Abraham: Further Studies in Genesis 1-11. Bloomsbury Publishing. ISBN 978-0-567-70311-8.
- Jobes, Karen H. (2014). 1, 2, and 3 John. Zondervan Academic. ISBN 978-0-310-51801-3.
- Kantor, Benjamin (2025). "The Origins of "In the Beginning . . .": Genesis 1:1 in Light of the Biblical Hebrew Reading Traditions". Journal of Biblical Literature. 144 (4): 601–636. doi:10.15699/jbl.1444.2025.2. ISSN 0021-9231.
