= Knowledge of Christ =

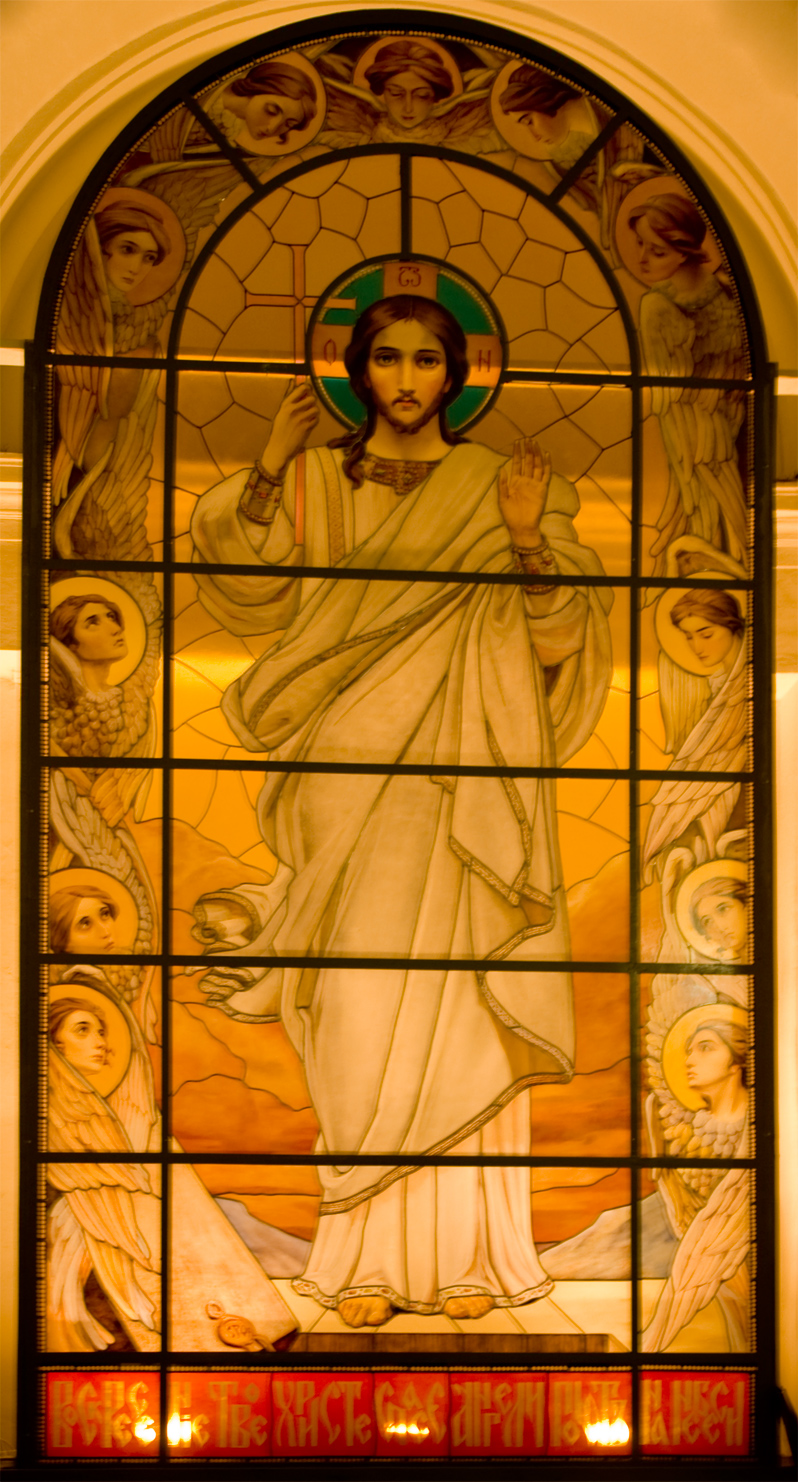
Stained glass window of Christ, Peter and Paul Cathedral, St. Petersburg, Russia

The knowledge of Christ refers to one of two possible, and at times related, topics in Christology: one addresses how Christians come to know Christ, the other focuses on the knowledge of Christ about the world. Discussions regarding the knowledge of Christ have had a central place in Christology for centuries. In the 20th century, the interplay between the two concepts was epitomized in the title of a book by Hans Urs von Balthasar: "Does Jesus Know Us? Do We Know Him?".

Christian teachings on what it means to "know Christ" effectively gave rise to the field of Christology, beginning with Apostle Paul's discussion in Philippians 2:5-6 about the relationship between Christ and God.

Different Christian traditions have recommended varying paths for gaining a better knowledge of Christ. While some traditions focus on sharing in Christ's sufferings, others emphasize the importance of scripture; while others suggest that the reading of scripture should be accompanied by specific spiritual exercises and contemplations.

Approaches to discussing "Christ's knowledge" generally have used two separate methodologies: one which relies solely on the analysis of the New Testament text itself, the other based on theological reasoning to infer further principles beyond the text. These two approaches, as well as the methods of interpreting specific Gospel passages have given rise to differences among Christians on this topic.

== Knowing Christ ==
"I want to know Christ—yes, to know the power of His resurrection and participation in His sufferings, becoming like Him in His death, and so, somehow, attaining to the resurrection from the dead" – Apostle Paul in Philippians 3:10-12

The Epistle to the Philippians has been the subject of much Christological research. Ralph P. Martin argues that Philippians 2 may be considered the beginning of the field of Christology, specifically referring to the rich analysis that Apostle Paul began in Philippians 2:5-6 regarding the relationship between Christ and God. Veronica Koperski views Philippians 3 as the beginning of the analysis of how Christians know Christ.

Paul's statement in Philippians 3:10-12 is preceded by his assertion in Philippians 3:8-9 regarding the supreme value of the knowledge of Christ above all else. In Philippians 3:10 Paul uses the Greek verb gignoskein (γιγνώσκω) which implies "personal knowledge", rather than an intellectual understanding. It is not Paul's aim to "know about Christ" but to know Christ.

In 325 the Nicene Creed mentioned the Holy Spirit, but it was only in 381 in the Council of Constantinople that it was formally affirmed that Christians gain the knowledge of Christ through the Holy Spirit who enlightens them to Christ.

Saint Augustine discussed Philippians 3:10-12's reference to the knowledge of Christ in his Sermon 169. Augustine viewed the power of resurrection not simply as that of rising from the dead, but the twofold power Christ exercises over Christians: first in terms of their future resurrection, secondly in terms of their redemption. Many other Christian thinkers from Ambrosiaster to John Chrysostom followed that trend and equated the knowledge of Christ with faithful Christian living.

Thomas Aquinas often referred to the eagerness of Jesus to teach, but he emphasized that unlike the words of other teachers, the words of Jesus could not be understood simply by hearing or reading them, but required their being heard through the Holy Spirit. Aquinas wrote that the root and fountain of our knowledge of God is Christ, the Word of God, and that all knowledge of God flows towards the faithful from the fountain that is Christ. Aquinas saw two groups of people who prohibited themselves from knowing Christ. The first group are those whose sensuality limits them to the earthly world of senses and not open to spiritual growth. The second group are those who are morally corrupt.

The Protestant Reformation placed more emphasis on knowing Christ through scripture than by sharing his sufferings or through Holy Communion. The concept of grace was at the center of Martin Luther's theology, and he believed that the saving work of Christ was delivered through the Gospel, viewing the works and words of Christ as the path to knowing him. Luther's great collaborator, Philipp Melanchthon was critical of the approach of Thomas Aquinas and scholastic Christology. His salvation oriented approach resonated with Luther's focus on justification and resulted in his coining the statement: "To know Christ means to know his benefits and not to reflect on his natures and modes of incarnation". Melanchthon deleted this statement from later editions of Loci Communes, but it has been associated with his views, and those of the followers of Luther.

John Calvin viewed the understanding of Christ's mission as an essential element of knowing him: knowing Christ involves an understanding of why he was sent. In Calvin's view humans are not capable of understanding God in his own right, and can only begin to know God through Christ. In Institutes of the Christian Religion (II.xv) Calvin was critical of those who know Christ "in name only", e.g. those who simply teach that Christ is the Redeemer without understanding or teaching how he redeems. For Calvin knowing Christ involves knowing his power and dignity in terms of the threefold office: as priest, prophet and king.

For Luther's contemporary, Ignatius of Loyola, the ability to know Christ could be improved through specific forms of meditative exercises. Loyola's Spiritual Exercises require about 30 days of Christian meditation, contemplation and mental imagery, with the goal of knowing Christ more intimately and loving him more ardently. The exercises continue to be used by Jesuits to date.

By around the 14th century in the Byzantine Empire, the tradition of hesychasm was developed, (most probably by St. Gregory of Sinai) and was supported by Saint Gregory Palamas. This style of mystical prayer and contemplation continues to be used in the Eastern Orthodox tradition as a spiritual practice that facilitates the knowing of Christ.

In the Catholic tradition, saints beside Ignatius of Loyola have suggested prayer and contemplation on scripture as a path to knowing Christ better. In The Way of Perfection, St. Theresa of Avila taught her nuns how to try to get to know Christ by using mental prayer. While the Catholic Church supports Christian meditation as beneficial in knowing Christ, in the letter Aspects of Christian meditation it specifically warned against using non-Christian (e.g. modified Buddhist) styles of meditations as an attempt to know Christ.

== Christ's knowledge ==
During the Apostolic Age, it was common in the Jewish tradition to assume that prophets in general had special illuminations, which later came to be called "infused knowledge" in Christian theology. An example reference is made in Luke 7:39 where the Pharisee expected a prophet to know about the woman who touched him.

Three specific levels of knowledge are often discussed in Christology as beatific, infused and acquired knowledge. Those (such as Thomas Aquinas) who adhere to the principle of the perfection of Christ reason that he must have had beatific knowledge of all things from The Word from the very beginning due to his perfection. However, the views of Aquinas are not generally accepted by all Christians.

Specific Gospel passages such as Matthew 11:25–27 and Luke 10:21–22 point to Jesus being a revealer of new knowledge, based on his special relationship with God the Father: "no man knoweth the Son, but the Father; neither knoweth any man the Father, save the Son". Moreover, these two passages can be read to imply an equality in the relationship between the Son and the Father.

However, the question of whether Christ had complete knowledge on earth prior to his Ascension has been subject to debate. In the analysis of the Gospels, one point of contention has been the two parallel verses in the Gospels of Matthew and Mark which refer to knowing the "day and the hour". While Mark 13:32 states: "But of that day and that hour knoweth no man, no, not the angels which are in heaven, neither the Son, but the Father," in most manuscripts Matthew 24:36 does not include the words "neither the Son".

In various Christian traditions, different solutions to this issue have been proposed, throughout the centuries. Cyril of Alexandria argued that it was "without doubt" that Christ did know the hour, but was emphasizing this from a passing human perspective. Other solutions along that line of reasoning have suggested that Christ had no "communicable knowledge" in a form that could be understood by the Apostles. Further approaches suggest a multi-level knowledge structure for Christ in terms of what can be revealed to humans, etc.

Historically, in orthodox Christianity the issue of the Hypostatic union posed the question of whether the knowledge found in the Divine component was identical with God's knowledge.

Writers on church history from as early as Louis Ellies du Pin in L'histoire de l'Eglise (1712) have also noted the role of Mark 13:32 in the controversies surrounding Arianism.

=== Roman Catholicism ===
In the 5th century, Saint Augustine (who considered the Incarnation of the Logos as necessary) argued that the "human Christ" possessed perfect knowledge from the very moment of the Incarnation. Augustine rejected any ignorance by Christ, stating that Jesus had perfect knowledge from the moment of Incarnation, having participated in the knowledge of The Word. Augustine's view of the statement in the Gospel of Luke that the young Jesus grew in knowledge and grace was that Jesus simply manifested his knowledge in a gradual manner.

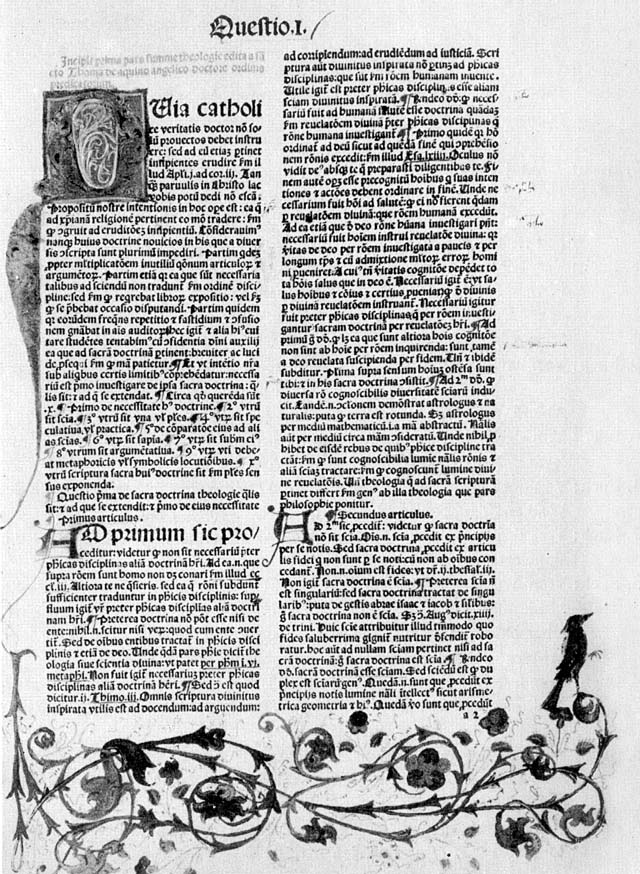
A page from a 1482 copy of Summa Theologiæ

In the 13th century, in Summa Theologiæ, Saint Thomas Aquinas undertook a systematic analysis of the knowledge of Christ. He posed wide ranging questions, analyzed them and provided answers. For instance, on the issue of the "experimental knowledge of Christ" and "beatific knowledge of Christ's soul" he posed and answered different sets of questions:

- Did Christ learn by experiments? Did he grow in his knowledge? Did he learn from other people? Did he learn from angels?

- Did the soul of Christ comprehend the Word or the Divine Essence? Did it know all things in the Word? Did the soul of Christ know the infinite in the Word? Did it see the Word or the Divine Essence clearer than did any other creature?

Following a lengthy analysis, Aquinas concluded that Christ had perfect knowledge from the very beginning.

According to dyophysitism, Jesus Christ God has a twofold nature: human and divine nature. As a consequence of this truth of faith, He has two intellects and two types of knowledge (human and divine), as well as two will and related operations (dyothelitism). Aquinas divided Christ’s knowledge in four kinds: one divine and three human. The three human forms of Christ's knowledge and of human creatures are:

1. beatific vision of God: is donated by God to the Saint souls living in Heaven. It is intuitive, non-dialogic and cannot be conceptualized. It is the same knowledge that God has of human souls;
2. infused science: it is infused by the Holy Spirit God, who is Spirit of truth, love, and knowledge. It is owned by prophets;
3. acquired knowledge.

In 1918, the Holy Office issued the decree Circa quasdam propositiones de scientia animae Christi which rejected the interpretation of Mark 13:32 that Christ did not know the hour and supported the belief that Christ had complete knowledge at all time, in view of the Hypostatic union. The Catechism of the Catholic Church (item 472) states that because Christ was endowed with true human knowledge, this could "increase in wisdom and in stature" because it was exercised in the historical conditions of his existence in space and time. However, item 474 states that Christ also shared the entire divine knowledge, namely:

By its union to the divine wisdom in the person of the Word incarnate, Christ enjoyed in his human knowledge the fullness of understanding of the eternal plans he had come to reveal. What he admitted to not knowing in this area, he elsewhere declared himself not sent to reveal.

In the 20th century, Hans Urs von Balthasar, relying on the concept of the "coincidence of the Person and mission of Christ", wrote that the Son of God could not have been sent on his mission without knowledge of what to do—only to be told later. In his view "he who is sent", being part of the Trinity, would have been consulted before setting on his mission. Balthasar hence reasoned that through the Logos Christ possessed all knowledge from the very beginning.

=== Protestantism ===
John Calvin's views on the knowledge of Christ differ from those of, for example, Athanasius. Calvin takes Luke's statement that the infant Jesus "grew in wisdom" to show that the pre-existent God the Son was "willing ... for a time, to be deprived of understanding," This view is followed by many Evangelical Protestants today. Other writers such as Bowman (2007) and Cullmann (1980) speak of a paradox between God's omniscience and limitations of that omniscience in Christ. The role of the Holy Spirit in gaining knowledge of Christ continues to be a key part of Protestant teachings on the knowledge of Christ.

=== Eastern Orthodoxy ===
The Eastern Orthodox view of Christ's knowledge differs from both the Roman Catholic and the Protestant perspectives. Referring to Mark 13:32 Orthodox theologian Sergei Bulgakov summarized the Orthodox position by stating that the passage does not preclude the possibility of Christ knowing the hour, but he may know it in a form that can not be communicated to the Apostles as humans, because human consciousness is not capable of understanding that class of event.

== See also ==
- Christology
- Gnosis
- Perfection of Christ
- You are Christ
