= Ernest DeWitt Burton =

American theologian

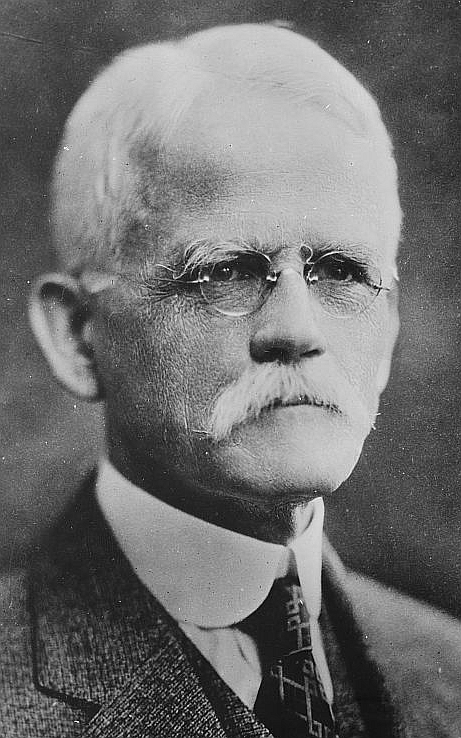
- Born: February 4, 1856; Granville
- Died: May 26, 1925
- Education: Denison University, Colgate Rochester Crozer Divinity School
- Occupations: Theologian, professor, university teacher

Ernest DeWitt Burton (February 4, 1856 – May 26, 1925) was an American biblical scholar who served as the third president of the University of Chicago from 1923 to 1925.

== Biography ==
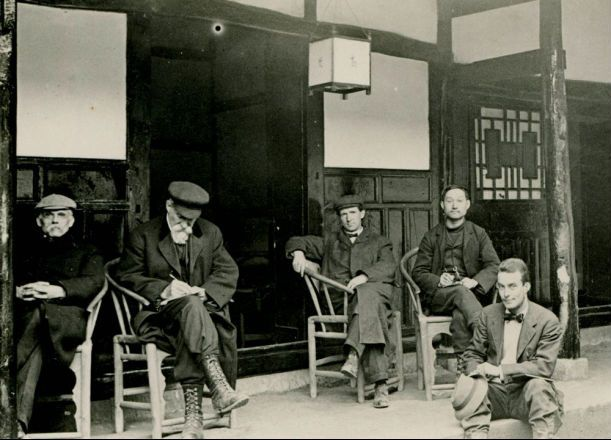
From left to right, E. D. Burton, T. C. Chamberlin, Joseph Beech, Y. T. Wang (interpreter), and R. T. Chamberlin (T. C. Chamberlin's son) at Santai County, Sichuan, during an exploratory trip through China in 1909 as part of the Oriental Educational Investigation Commission.

Burton was born in Granville, Ohio and graduated from Denison University in 1876. After graduating from Rochester Theological Seminary in 1882, he studied in Germany at Leipzig and Berlin, then taught at seminaries in Rochester and Newton (1882–1892). Burton was then appointed chief of the department of New Testament literature and interpretation at the University of Chicago and in 1897 was named editor of the American Journal of Theology. Burton was president of the Chicago Society of Biblical Research in 1906–1907. In 1908 he was appointed head of the Oriental Educational Investigation Commission supported by John D. Rockefeller to reconnoiter the Eastern world as a potential site for the humanitarian projects of the nascent Rockefeller Foundation. The journey lasted for more than a year. He served as the third president of the University of Chicago from 1923 until his death from cancer in 1925.

== Publications ==
Burton notably wrote with Shailer Mathews, Constructive Studies in the Life of Christ (1901) and Principles and Ideals of the Sunday School (1903), and with J. M. P. Smith and G. B. Smith he wrote Biblical Ideas of Atonement (1909).

== Works ==
- Burton, Ernest DeWitt (1888). Syntax of the Moods and Tenses of the Greek Verb. Boston, MA: Privately printed. OCLC 9403847.
- ——— (1895). The Records and Letters of the Apostolic Age: the New Testament, Acts, Epistles, and Revelation, in the version of 1881. New York: Scribner's. OCLC 977771473.
- ———; Mathews, Shailer (1901). Constructive Studies in the Life of Christ, prepared for use in advanced Bible classes. Constructive Bible studies. Vol. 1. Chicago, IL: University of Chicago Press. OCLC 773549.
- ———; Mathews, Shailer (1907). Principles and Ideals of the Sunday School, an essay in religious pedagogy. Chicago, IL: University of Chicago Press. OCLC 978199464.
- ———; Mathews, Shailer (1904). The Life of Christ: An Aid to Historical Study and a Condensed Commentary on the Gospels. University of Chicago publications in religious education., Constructive studies. Chicago, IL: University of Chicago Press. OCLC 8428983. - Originally published under the title Constructive Studies in the Life of Christ
- ——— (1904). Short Introduction to the Gospels. Chicago, IL: University of Chicago Press. OCLC 3050966.
- ——— (1904). Studies in the Gospel according to Mark, for the use of classes in secondary schools and in the secondary division of the Sunday school. Constructive Bible studies., Secondary series. Chicago, IL: University of Chicago Press. OCLC 682073.
- ——— (1904). Some Principles of Literary Criticism and their Application to the Synoptic Problem. Chicago, IL: University of Chicago Press. ISBN 9780837025506. OCLC 505741232.
- ———; Smith, Gerald Birney; Smith, J. M. Powis (1909). Biblical ideas of Atonement. Chicago, IL: University of Chicago Press. OCLC 883437613.
- ——— (1918). Spirit, Soul, and Flesh: the usage of pneuma, psyche, and sarx in Greek writings and translated works from the earliest period to 180 A.D., and of their equivalents ruah̥, nefes̲h̲ and basar in the Hebrew Old Testament. Chicago, IL: University of Chicago Press. OCLC 607608377.
- ——— (1920). A Critical and Exegetical Commentary on the Epistle to the Galatians. International critical commentary on the Holy Scriptures of the Old and New Testaments. Vol. 35. New York: Scribner's. OCLC 1936292.
- ———; Goodspeed, Edgar J. (1920). A Harmony of the Synoptic Gospels in Greek. Chicago, IL: University of Chicago Press. OCLC 2328219.
- ——— (1920). Jesus of Nazareth, How He Thought, Lived, Worked, and Achieved. Chicago, IL: American Institute of Sacred Literature. OCLC 18243670.
- ——— (1923). Source Book for the Study of the Teaching of Jesus on Its Historical Relationships. Chicago, IL: University of Chicago Press. OCLC 1021350.
- ———; Willoughby, Harold R. (1927). Education in a Democratic World. Chicago, IL: University of Chicago Press. OCLC 772015. - contains "The published writings of Ernest De Witt Burton": pages 153-159

Academic offices
Preceded by Harry Pratt Judson	President of the University of Chicago; 1923–1925	Succeeded by Max Mason
