= Hanna Holborn Gray =

American historian

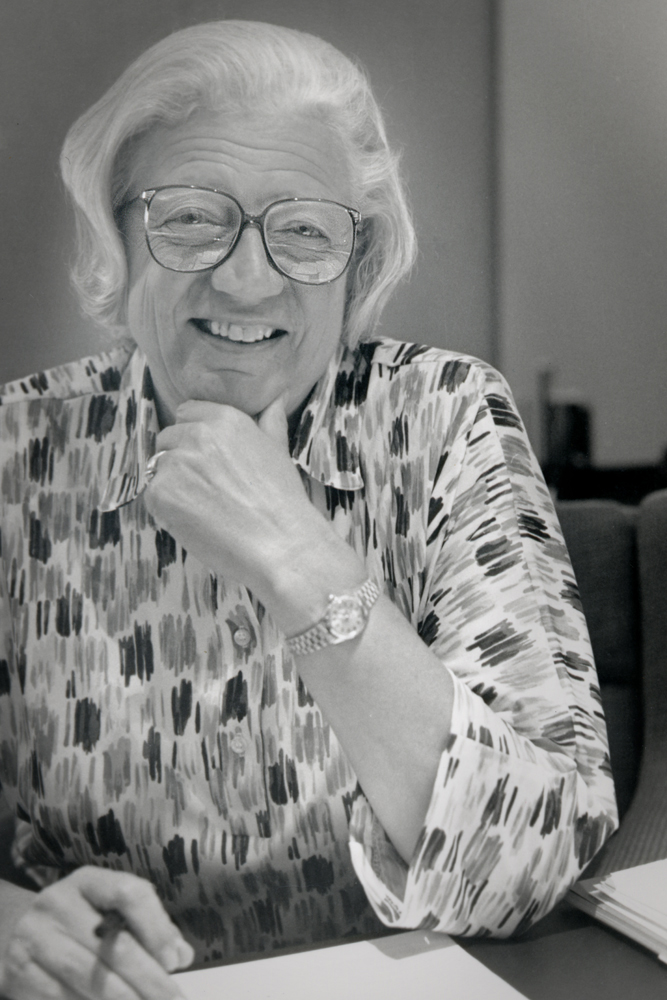

9th President of the University of Chicago
- In office 1978–1993
- Preceded by: John T. Wilson
- Succeeded by: Hugo F. Sonnenschein

18th President of Yale University
- Pro tempore
- In office 1977–1978
- Preceded by: Kingman Brewster, Jr.
- Succeeded by: A. Bartlett Giamatti

Personal details
- Born: October 25, 1930 (age 95) Heidelberg, Germany
- Spouse: Charles Montgomery Gray (m. 1954; died 2011)
- Parent(s): Hajo Holborn; Annemarie Bettmann
- Education: Bryn Mawr College; University of Oxford; Harvard University

Hanna Holborn Gray (born October 25, 1930) is an American historian of Renaissance and Reformation political thought and Professor of History Emerita at the University of Chicago. She served as 10th president of the University of Chicago from 1978 to 1993, having earlier served as president pro tempore of Yale University in 1977–1978. At both schools, she was the first woman to hold their highest executive office. When named to the post in Chicago, she became one of the first women in the United States to hold the full presidency of a major university.

== Biography ==
Holborn was born in Heidelberg, Germany, the daughter of Hajo Holborn, a professor of European history at Yale who fled to America from Nazi Germany, and Annemarie Bettmann, a philologist. Her older brother, Frederick, became a White House aide and professor of foreign policy at Johns Hopkins' School of Advanced International Studies.

Gray attended The Foote School in New Haven, Connecticut (graduated 1943), Sidwell Friends School in Washington, D.C., Hopkins School in New Haven, then Bryn Mawr College in suburban Philadelphia, from which she graduated in 1950. She traveled to Oxford as a Fulbright Scholar. She earned a PhD from Harvard University in 1957, and taught there, becoming an assistant professor in 1959. At Harvard, her experiences were circumscribed by her "outsider status" as a woman. Although technically coeducational in some graduate programs by the 1950s, women were mostly relegated to the "separate, but not equal" Radcliffe College. When Gray became the first and only woman tutor in history and literature, she was reluctantly allowed into the tutor's dining society but was distinctly unwelcome by the other tutors. Similarly, when Gray advanced to instructor, as a woman, she was forbidden in the main faculty hall and was required to enter through the side door, although she decided to just go in the front door, anyway. (She took her cue from Harvard professor, Helen Maud Cam, who earlier in the decade became the first woman to attend faculty morning services in the over 300 years of the institution just by showing up every day and sitting down).

Gray moved to Chicago when her husband was appointed to a position at the University of Chicago. She spent her first year as a research fellow at the Newberry Library, and then began teaching history at Chicago earning tenure in 1964. From 1966 to 1970, she was co-editor of the Journal of Modern History with her husband. Gray was named dean of the College of Arts and Sciences at Northwestern University in 1972 and became professor of history and provost at Yale University in 1974. She served as acting president of Yale for fourteen months after President Kingman Brewster unexpectedly accepted an appointment as United States Ambassador to the Court of St. James's.

Gray then returned to the University of Chicago, serving as president from 1978 to 1993, the first female (full) president of a major university in the United States. In 1991, she was awarded the Presidential Medal of Freedom. She retired in June 1993 but remains Harry Pratt Judson Distinguished Service Professor Emerita.

Gray has also served as a director, board member or trustee of the Harvard Corporation, the Yale Corporation, the Smithsonian Institution, JP Morgan Chase, the Andrew W. Mellon Foundation, the Marlboro School of Music, the Council on Foreign Relations, the Concord Coalition, the Mayo Clinic, the Brookings Institution, and Bryn Mawr College. Gray has received honorary degrees from more than sixty institutions, including the University of Chicago, The College of William and Mary, Harvard, Oxford, Yale, Brown, Columbia, Princeton, Bowdoin College and Duke. She served as chairman of the board of the second largest foundation in America, the Howard Hughes Medical Institute, until 2010. The portrait of Gray that hangs at the University of Chicago has been "stolen" (and returned) on more than one occasion as a student prank. Gray published a memoir, An Academic Life, in 2018.

== Honors ==
- Medal of Liberty
- Presidential Medal of Freedom
- Francis Boyer Award
- Golden Plate Award of the American Academy of Achievement
- member, American Academy of Arts and Sciences (1973)
- member, American Philosophical Society (1981)
- Quantrell Award (1996)

== Chronology ==
- Teaching Fellow, Harvard University, 1955–1957
- Instructor, Harvard University, 1957–1959
- Assistant Professor, Harvard University, 1959–1960
- Assistant Professor of History at the University of Chicago 1961–1964
- Associate Professor of History at the University of Chicago 1964–1972
- Professor and Dean, Northwestern University 1972–1974
- Professor and Provost at Yale University 1974–1978
- Acting President of Yale University 1977–1978
- Professor of History at the University of Chicago 1978–present
- President of the University of Chicago 1978–1993
- Member of the Harvard Corporation, 1997-2005

== Works and publications ==
- Hanna Holborn Gray, "Some Reflections on the Second Generation." The Second Generation. Émigrés from Nazi Germany as Historians, ed. Andreas Daum, Harmut Lehmann, and James J. Sheehan. New York: Berghahn Books, 2016, ISBN 978-1-78238-985-9, 102–113.
- Gray, Hanna Holborn (2018). An Academic Life: A Memoir. Princeton University Press. ISBN 978-1-4008-8934-1. OCLC 1026492115.

Academic offices
Preceded by Kingman Brewster, Jr.	President of Yale University (acting); 1977–1978	Succeeded by A. Bartlett Giamatti
Preceded by John T. Wilson	President of the University of Chicago; 1978–1993	Succeeded by Hugo F. Sonnenschein
