= Hugo F. Sonnenschein =

American economist and educational administrator

- Born: November 14, 1940; New York City, New York, U.S.
- Died: July 15, 2021 (aged 80); Chicago, Illinois, U.S.

Academic background
- Education: University of Rochester (BA); Purdue University (MS, PhD)
- Website: Information at IDEAS / RePEc

Hugo Freund Sonnenschein (November 14, 1940 – July 15, 2021) was an American economist and academic administrator who was the 11th president of the University of Chicago from 1993 to 2000.

== Early life and education ==
Sonnenschein was born in New York City on November 14, 1940. He was raised in Brooklyn. He attended Oakwood School in Poughkeepsie, New York, graduating in 1957. He studied at the University of Rochester, obtaining a Bachelor of Arts in 1961. He subsequently undertook postgraduate studies at Purdue University, earning a Master of Science in 1962 and a Ph.D. two years later.

== Career ==
Sonnenschein was first employed as an assistant professor at the University of Minnesota from 1964 to 1970. Over the next two decades, he worked as a professor, first at the University of Massachusetts from 1970 to 1973, then at Northwestern University (1973–1976) and Princeton University (1976–1988).

Sonnenschein first acted in university administration as dean of the School of Arts and Sciences at the University of Pennsylvania from 1988 to 1991. He proceeded to serve as Provost of Princeton University from 1991 to 1993. As the Adam Smith Distinguished Service Professor in Economics at the University of Chicago, his specialty was microeconomic theory, with a particular interest in general equilibrium theory. He was known for the Sonnenschein–Mantel–Debreu theorem, and more generally for his work on Walrasian general equilibrium theory. Sonnenschein later served as the 11th president of the University of Chicago from 1993 until 2000. He remained an honorary member of the university's board of trustees.

Sonnenschein was elected to the American Philosophical Society in 2001. He received the 2009 BBVA Foundation Frontiers of Knowledge Award in Economy, Finance and Management (co-winner with Andreu Mas-Colell).

=== University of Chicago ===
During Sonnenschein's presidency at the University of Chicago which started on July 1, 1993, he increased the school's fund raising expectations, devoted many resources to the improvement of campus life and facilities, fortified the enrollment of the best students in the nation, and furthered a comprehensive plan to continue expanding the undergraduate college which had been started by the previous presidents of the school. Sonnenschein's Campus Master Plan (only the fourth in the 108-year history of the school) included the construction of the Gerald Ratner Athletics Center, building a new campus for the Graduate School of Business and increasing the university library's capacity. During this time, University of Chicago students took first place in 14 of 21 fields of study and second in six of the remaining seven fields of study at junior-level faculty hires in universities across states.

Under Sonnenschein's leadership, the faculty made significant changes to the curriculum, including a reduction to the required number of "Core" courses in the college. Some changes also included more opportunities for students to learn foreign languages and study abroad. These moves had the effect of producing capital through tuition and expanding the school's network of alumni and benefactors, but were also controversial. They were criticized by students, alumni, and faculty, who regarded them as watering down the university's academic standards.

In Sonnenschein's third year, the university raised $676 million for the purposes of supporting student aid, facilities, and research at the end of the school's five year "Campaign for the Next Century". During Sonnenschein's tenure, the university's endowment increased from $1.2 billion to $2.9 billion, following the increased fund raising rate in the president's last five years.

== Personal life ==
Sonnenschein married Elizabeth Gunn Sonnenschein in 1962. They met during his freshman year at Rochester and remained married until his death. Together, they had three children: Leah, Amy, and Rachel.

Sonnenschein died on July 15, 2021, at the University of Chicago Medical Center in Hyde Park, Chicago. He was 80 years old.

The Hugo F. Sonnenschein Medal of Excellence, the highest undergraduate award conferred by the College of the University of Chicago, is named in Sonnenschein's honor.

Academic offices
| Preceded by Hanna Holborn Gray | President of the University of Chicago; 1993–2000 | Succeeded by Don Michael Randel |
