= List of University of Chicago Booth School of Business faculty =

This list of University of Chicago Booth School of Business faculty contains long-term faculty members and temporary academic staffs of the University of Chicago Booth School of Business. The long-term faculty members consists of tenure/tenure-track and equivalent academic positions, while that of temporary academic staffs consists of lecturers (without tenure), postdoctoral researchers, visiting professors or scholars (visitors), and equivalent academic positions.

== Economics and finance ==
- Robert Z. Aliber, developer of the Program of International Studies in Business and the Center for Studies in International Finance
- Gary Becker, Nobel Prize–winning economist, considered to have coined "human capital" and "rotten kid theorem," known for price theory (deceased)
- Marianne Bertrand, Chris P. Dialynas Professor of Economics
- Ronald Coase, Nobel Prize–winning economist, known for work in contract theory (deceased)
- Eugene Fama, the "man who launched modern finance"; Nobel Prize–winning financial economist; originator of the efficient-market hypothesis and co-originator of Fama & French Three Factors Model (also alumnus, M.B.A. and Ph.D)
- Robert Fogel, Nobel Prize–winning economist, known for work in economic history and population economics (deceased)
- Matthew Gentzkow, Richard O. Ryan Professor of Economics and Neubauer Family Faculty Fellow; received 2014 John Bates Clark Medal (former faculty member)
- Harry Gideonse (1901–1985), president of Brooklyn College, and chancellor of the New School for Social Research
- Austan Goolsbee, economics advisor to President Barack Obama, Fulbright Scholar researching Internet taxation in the US and European Union, and New York Times economics columnist
- Erik Hurst, V. Duane Rath Professor of Economics; deputy director of the Becker Friedman Institute; John E. Jeuck faculty fellow
- Randall Kroszner, professor of economics, former member of the Federal Reserve Board of Governors (2006–2009)
- Steven Levitt, economist, author of Freakonomics, John Bates Clark Medal recipient and director of the Becker Center on Chicago Price Theory (retired)
- John A. List, economist, pioneer in the field of experimental economics
- Merton Miller, Nobel Prize–winning economist (deceased)
- Toby Moskowitz, Fischer Black Prize winning financial economist (former faculty member)
- Sendil Mullainathan, economist and MacArthur Fellow (former faculty member)
- Kevin M. Murphy, economist, John Bates Clark Medal recipient and MacArthur Fellow (emeritus)
- Raghuram Rajan, governor of the Reserve Bank of India 2013–2016, honorary adviser to Indian Prime Minister Manmohan Singh, chief economist of the International Monetary Fund 2003–2006, winner of the Fischer Black Prize and co-author (with Luigi Zingales) of Saving Capitalism From the Capitalists
- Richard N. Rosett (deceased), former dean, chairman of the National Bureau of Economic Research and mentor of Nobel Prize winner Richard Thaler
- Myron Scholes, Nobel Prize–winning economist, co-originator of the Black–Scholes options pricing model (also alumnus, M.B.A. and Ph.D) (former faculty member)
- George Shultz, economist and former dean, also former U.S. secretary of labor, U.S. secretary of the treasury, and U.S. secretary of state (deceased)
- Jeremy Siegel, professor of Finance at the Wharton School of the University of Pennsylvania, creator of the Siegel's paradox and CNBC commentator (former faculty member)
- Richard Thaler, Nobel Prize-winning behavioral economist, considered the "father of behavioral finance", cited as significant influence on bridging psychology and economics in decision models by Daniel Kahneman (2002 Nobel laureate in Economics)
- George S. Tolley, agriculture and resource economist (deceased)
- W. Allen Wallis, former dean (deceased)

== Strategic management ==
- Ronald S. Burt, professor of sociology and strategy, known for his study of brokerage in social networks and the social structure of competitive advantage; author of Brokerage and Closure: An Introduction to Social Capital
- Linda E. Ginzel, Clinical Professor of Managerial Behavior; teaches New Venture Strategy; child product safety advocate and founder of Kids In Danger
- James O. McKinsey, founder of McKinsey & Company in 1926, pioneered budgeting as a management tool
- James E. Schrager, Clinical Professor of Entrepreneurship and Strategic Management; teaches New Venture Strategy

== Private equity ==
- Steven Kaplan, Neubauer Family professor of entrepreneurship and finance
- Scott Meadow, clinical professor of entrepreneurship and faculty director of global initiatives
- Luigi Zingales, professor of entrepreneurial finance and private equity, and co-author (with Raghuram Rajan) of Saving Capitalism From the Capitalists

== Econometrics and statistics ==
- Nicholas Polson, Robert Law, Jr. Professor of Econometrics and Statistics
- Veronika Ročková, professor of Econometrics and Statistics, and James S. Kemper Foundation Faculty Scholar

== See also ==
- University of Chicago Booth School of Business
- List of University of Chicago Booth School of Business alumni
- List of University of Chicago people
