= Lawrence A. Kimpton =

American philosopher and educator

Lawrence Alpheus Kimpton (1910–1973) was an American philosopher and academic administrator, serving as the 6th president of the University of Chicago from 1951 to 1960. He earned a B.A. at Stanford and a Ph.D. in philosophy at Cornell University, and he taught at Deep Springs College before joining Chicago as a professor of philosophy in 1943.

Robert Maynard Hutchins, then president of the university, invited Kimpton for an interview in 1944. Kimpton recalled Hutchins's questions thus:

Don't you think the University is lousy? Don't you think the great books are great? And isn't the function of an educational institution to educate? Kimpton assented to these propositions, so Hutchins asked, do you know anything about student personnel administration? Kimpton replied, not a thing. At this, Hutchins arose, shook his hand, and congratulated him on being the new dean of students.

Kimpton addressed a variety of academic and budget problems before stepping down in 1960.

In 1958, Kimpton, then Chancellor of the University of Chicago, suppressed the "beat edition" of the university's publication THE CHICAGO REVIEW. (Note: THE CHICAGO REVIEW was/is a student/faculty literary publication published by the University of Chicago.) In 1958 the REVIEW was edited by then University of Chicago student Irving Rosenthal.

In the autumn 1958 edition of the REVIEW, Rosenthal had published excerpts from NAKED LUNCH, by William Burroughs, and a few excerpts of writings by Jack Kerouac. On October 25, 1958, Jack Mabley, a columnist for the CHICAGO DAILY NEWS, attacked the autumn REVIEW, with the Burroughs and Kerouac excerpts, in a DAILY NEWS column entitled "Filthy Writing on the Midway." In this article Mabley blamed the university and the REVIEW for promoting obscenity. The Mabley article alarmed Chancellor Kimpton, who feared the article could cause a loss of financial grants to the university. According to Rosenthal, Kimpton's entire purpose as Chancellor of the university was not to educate a "free society" but to placate the university trustees by increasing the university endowment.

In the Winter 1958 REVIEW, Rosenthal had intended to continue the edition with excerpts from NAKED LUNCH and of the Kerouac writings. In reaction Chancellor Kimpton forbid the publication of the winter issue completely, declaring that the REVIEW had to be "toned down." In actuality, as it turned out, the Chancellor meant "completely suppressed." Declaring the REVIEW a freedom of speech matter, Rosenthal and six of seven REVIEW staff-members decided to resign rather than stop the winter issue. After resigning, a few months later Rosenthal founded the literary magazine BIG TABLE which then published the complete uncensored edition of the suppressed winter 1958 REVIEW. (For reference to this, see THE BEATS, A LITERARY REFERENCE, by Matt Theado, under the chapter "The Chicago Review and A Case of Censorship", pp. 103–105.)

Academic offices
Preceded by Robert Maynard Hutchins	President of the University of Chicago; 1951–1960	Succeeded by George W. Beadle
