= Edgar J. Goodspeed =

American theologian & scholar (1871-1962)

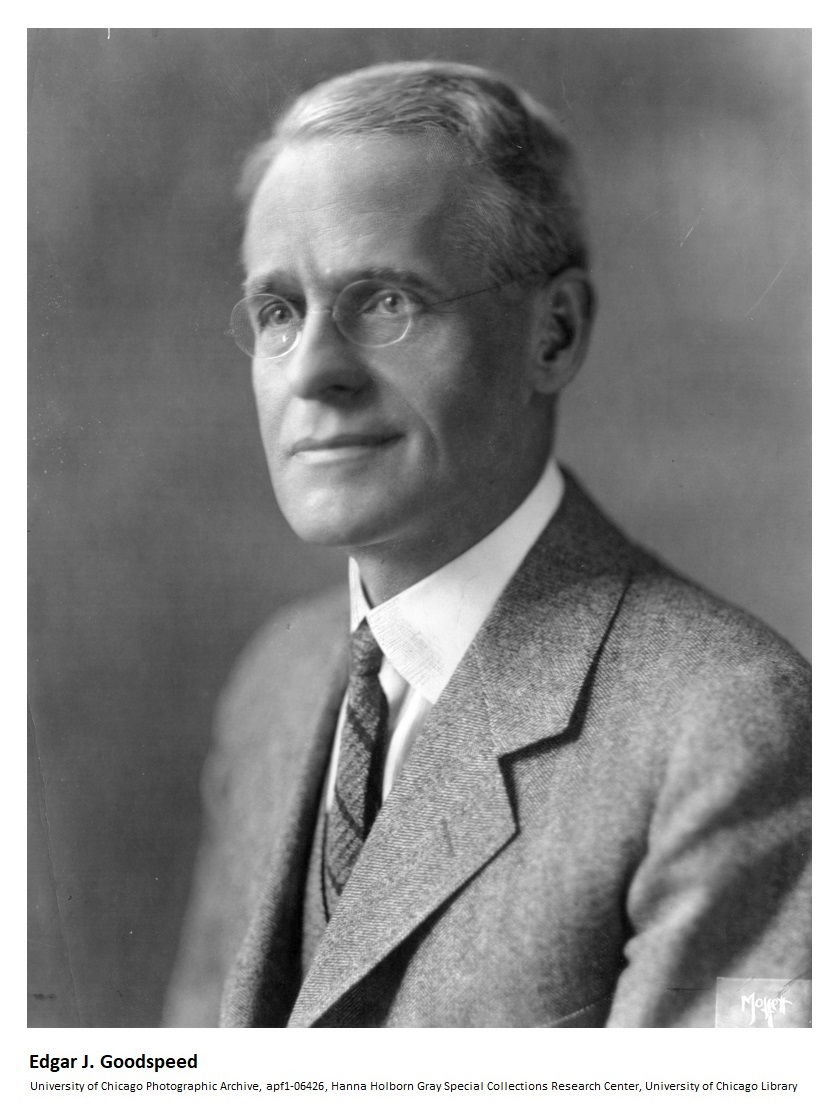
- Born: Edgar Johnson Goodspeed; October 23, 1871; Quincy
- Died: January 13, 1962 (aged 90); Los Angeles
- Education: Doctor of Philosophy, Doctor of Divinity
- Alma mater: Denison University; University of Chicago
- Occupation: Translator, university teacher, Bible translator, writer, New Testament scholar, papyrologist, orientalist
- Employer: Society of Biblical Literature (1919–1919); University of Chicago (1901–1937)
- Works: How to Read the Bible, The Bible: An American Translation
- Awards: emeritus (1937); honorary doctor of the Denison University
- Position held: chair (1919–1919), emeritus (1937–1962)

Edgar Johnson Goodspeed (October 23, 1871 – January 13, 1962) was an American theologian and scholar of Greek and the New Testament, and Ernest DeWitt Burton Distinguished Service Professor of the University of Chicago until his retirement. He taught for many years at the University of Chicago, whose collection of New Testament manuscripts he enriched by his searches. The University's collection is now named in his honor.

== Biography ==
Edgar J. Goodspeed was born in Quincy, Illinois. He was the son of Thomas Wakefield Goodspeed. At the age of ten, Goodspeed had been tutored in Latin by his father's students at Baptist Union Theological Seminary in Morgan Park, Illinois. Edgar J. Goodspeed received pre-college classes at the Old University of Chicago, and finished in 1886.

His wife's name was Elfleda Bond, and his father-in-law was Joseph Bond.

He died in 1962 and was interred in the Forest Lawn Memorial Park Cemetery in Glendale, California.

=== Education ===
He earned a B.A. from Denison University in Granville, Ohio 1890, and he then studied Semitics at Yale for one year under William Rainey Harper. A little later, Harper was appointed as the first president of the University of Chicago, and Goodspeed moved to Chicago and continued his graduate studies at this new institution, where Goodspeed's father was one of the founders and secretary of the Board of Trustees. He was a post-graduate fellow at the University of Chicago from 1892, and he received his Doctor of Biblical Studies degree in 1897.

Goodspeed received his Ph.D. in 1898 at The University of Chicago. He spent the following two years abroad, traveling and studying in Germany, England, the Netherlands, Egypt, Palestine, and Greece.

In 1928, Goodspeed received a doctorate in Divinity from the Denison University (Doctor honoris causa).

=== Academic work ===
While pursuing graduate work, Goodspeed taught classics at two Chicago-area schools, the Morgan Park Academy and South Side Academy. He taught In classical languages at the Morgan Park Academy in 1891 and 1892 and at the South Side Academy from 1894 to 1898. He taught Biblical and Patristic Greek at the University of Chicago starting in 1898.

Upon his return to Chicago in 1900, he again joined the University faculty and rose steadily to become Professor of Biblical and Patristic Greek in 1915. In 1919 he served as president of the Society of Biblical Literature and Exegesis. When his New Testament colleague Ernest DeWitt Burton was appointed president of the University of Chicago in 1923, Goodspeed succeeded him as Chairman of the Department of New Testament and Early Christian Literature. From 1929 to 1937 Goodspeed was chairman of the department of New Testament studies at the University of Chicago. In 1937, Goodspeed became an emeritus member of the faculty and retired with his wife, Elfleda Bond Goodspeed, to a home in Bel-Air, California.

== Awards ==
- Doctor honoris causa (D.D.), Denison University, 1928

== Works ==
According to the University of Chicago Library during the Goodspeed lifetime "he wrote 64 books, collaborated on 16 others, and published 189 major articles and countless reviews".

=== Bible translations ===
He is widely remembered for his translations of the Bible: The New Testament: an American Translation (1923), and (with John Merlin Powis Smith) The Bible: An American Translation (1935), the "Goodspeed Bible". He is also remembered for his translation of the Apocrypha, and that translation was included in The Complete Bible, An American Translation (1939). Finally, Harper & Brothers issued his widely heralded The Apostolic Fathers: An American Translation (1950).

Aside from his scholarly work, he wrote many non-dogmatic introductions to biblical literature for the lay reader:

=== Books ===
- Goodspeed, Edgar J.; Hicks, Edmund W. (1874). The Life of Jesus for Young People. Mt. Union, OH: L. U. Snead. OCLC 25311564.
- ——— (1916). The Story of the New Testament. Chicago, IL: University of Chicago Press. OCLC 2223156.
- ——— (1925). The Making of the English New Testament. Chicago, IL: University of Chicago Press. OCLC 863524247.
- ——— (1926). The Formation of the New Testament. Chicago, IL: University of Chicago Press. OCLC 855436075.
- ——— (1931). Strange New Gospels. Chicago, IL: University of Chicago Press. OCLC 186915807.
- ——— (1934). The Story of the Old Testament. Chicago, IL: University of Chicago Press. OCLC 2043676.
- ——— (1936). The Story of the Apocrypha. Chicago, IL: University of Chicago Press. OCLC 464128574.
- ——— (1936). The Story of the Bible. Chicago, IL: University of Chicago Press. OCLC 248799732.
- ——— (1937). An Introduction to the New Testament. Chicago, IL: University of Chicago Press. OCLC 386367.
- ——— (1957). The Twelve, The Story of Christ's Apostles. Philadelphia: J. C. Winston. OCLC 613792134.
- ——— (1940). How Came the Bible?. Apex books. New York: Abingdon Press. OCLC 4125230.
- ——— (1942). A History of Early Christian Literature. Phoenix book. Vol. 220. Chicago, IL: University of Chicago Press. OCLC 265232538.
- ——— (1945). Problems of New Testament Translation. Chicago, IL: University of Chicago Press. OCLC 1020965727.
- ——— (1946). How to Read the Bible. Philadelphia: John C. Winston Company. OCLC 383642.
- ——— (1950). The Apostolic Fathers: An American Translation. New York: Harper & Brothers. OCLC 1016341493.
- ——— (1950). A Life of Jesus. New York: Harper & Brothers. OCLC 1153660265.
- ——— (1956). Modern Apocrypha. Boston: The Beacon Press. OCLC 1019952.

=== Edited by ===
- ———; Smith, J. M. Powis, eds. (1933). The Short Bible: An American translation. Chicago, IL: University of Chicago Press. OCLC 1817384.
- ———; Smith, J. M. Powis, eds. (1936). The Junior Bible: An American translation. Illustrated by Frank Dobias. Chicago, IL: University of Chicago Press. OCLC 4470993.

== Sources ==
- Cobb, J.H. (1948), A Biography and Bibliography of Edgar Johnson Goodspeed, Chicago: University of Chicago Press
- Cook, J.I. (1981), Edgar Johnson Goodspeed: Articulate Scholar, Chico, CA: Scholar's Press
- Bademan, R. Bryan (2006). ""Monkeying with the Bible": Edgar J. Goodspeed's American Translation". Religion and American Culture. 16 (1): 55–93. doi:10.1525/rac.2006.16.1.55. S2CID 233335534.
- Byrd, Robert O. (2007). "Edgar Johnson Goodspeed: American Moffat or American Monkey?". Baptist History and Heritage. 42 (2): 36–47.
