= Shailer Mathews =

American theologian (1863–1941)

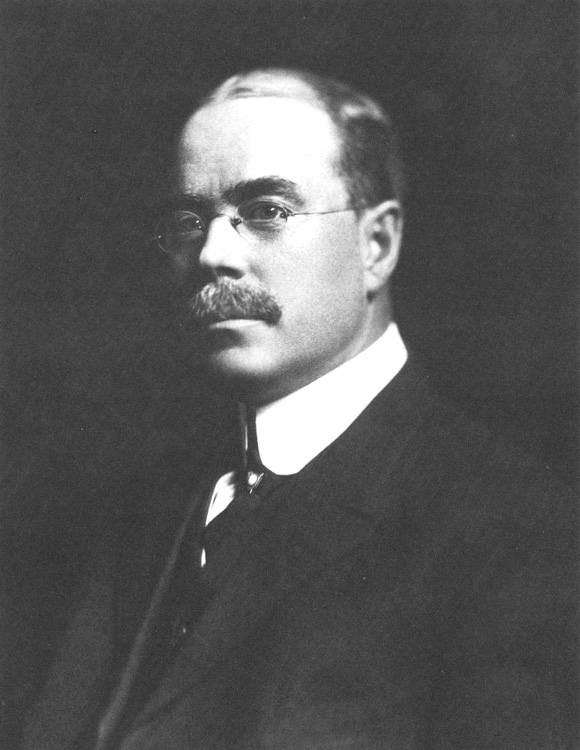
- Born: May 26, 1863; Portland, Maine, US
- Died: October 23, 1941 (aged 78); Chicago, Illinois, US

Academic background
- Education: Colby College
- Influences: Hans Delbrück; William Rainey Harper; Ignaz Jastrow; Herbert Spencer; Adolph Wagner

Academic work
- Discipline: Theology
- School or tradition: Baptism; modernism; personalism; Social Gospel; theological liberalism
- Institutions: University of Chicago
- Influenced: Richard R. Wright Jr.

Shailer Mathews (1863–1941) was an American liberal Christian theologian, involved with the Social Gospel movement.

== Career ==
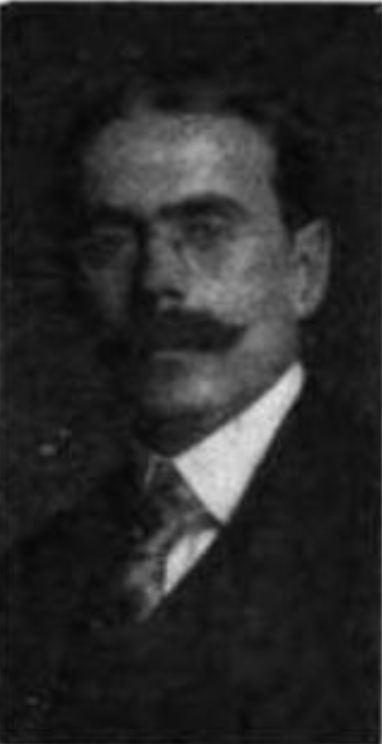
Mathews in 1906

Born on May 26, 1863, in Portland, Maine, and graduated from Colby College. Mathews was a progressive, advocating social concerns as part of the Social Gospel message, and subjecting biblical texts to scientific study, in opposition to contemporary conservative Christians. He incorporated evolutionary theory into his religious views, noting that the two were not mutually exclusive. He remained a devout Baptist for his entire life, and helped establish the Northern Baptist Convention, serving as its president in 1915. Mathews was a prolific author, served as president of the Chicago Society of Biblical Research twice (in 1898–1899 and 1928–1929), and also served as dean of the Divinity School of the University of Chicago (from 1908 to 1933). An endowed chair in his honor, the Shailer Mathews Professorship at the University of Chicago Divinity School, has recently been held by Franklin I. Gamwell and Hans Dieter Betz. He died on October 23, 1941. His ashes are interred in the crypt of First Unitarian Church of Chicago.

== Select publications ==
- The Social Teachings of Jesus, 1897
- A History of New Testament Times in Palestine, 1899
- The French Revolution, 1900
- The Messianic Hope in the New Testament, 1905
- The Church and the Changing Order, 1907
- The Social Gospel, 1909
- The Gospel and the modern Man, 1910
- The Social Teaching of Jesus, 1910
- Scientific Management in Churches, 1911
- The Individual and the Social Gospel, 1914
- The Spiritual Interpretation of History, 1916
- Patriotism and Religion, 1918
- The Validity of American Ideals, 1922
- The Faith of Modernism, 1924
- Jesus on Social Institutions, 1928
- The Atonement and the Social Process, 1930
- The Growth of the Idea of God, 1931
- Immortality and the Cosmic Process, 1933
- Christianity and Social Process, 1934
- Creative Christianity, 1935
- New Faith for Old: An Autobiography, 1936
- The Church and the Christian, 1938
- Is God Emeritus? 1940

== See also ==
- Ernest DeWitt Burton
