= The Bible: An American Translation =

An American Translation
- Full name: The Bible, An American Translation
- Abbreviation: AAT
- Language: English
- Complete Bible published: 1931; 1939 with Apocrypha
- Authorship: J.M. Powis Smith (OT) and Edgar J. Goodspeed (deuterocanonical books and NT)
- Publisher: The University of Chicago Press
- Genesis 1:1–3 When God began to create the heavens and the earth, the earth was a desolate waste, with darkness covering the abyss and a tempestuous wind raging over the surface of the waters. Then God said, "Let there be light!" John 3:16 For God loved the world so much that he gave his only Son, so that no one who believes in him should be lost, but that they should all have eternal life.

The Bible: An American Translation (AAT) is an English version of the Bible consisting of the Old Testament translated by a group of scholars under the editorship of John Merlin Powis Smith, the Apocrypha translated by Edgar J. Goodspeed, and the New Testament translated by Edgar J. Goodspeed.

== Editions ==
This translation has been made available in a number of editions as shown here:

Editions of The Bible: An American Translation
Edition	Year	Editors	Publisher
The New Testament: An American Translation	1923	Goodspeed	University of Chicago Press
The Old Testament: An American Translation	1927	Powis Smith	University of Chicago Press
The Bible: An American Translation	1931	Powis Smith and Goodspeed	University of Chicago Press
The Short Bible: An American Translation	1933	Powis Smith and Goodspeed	University of Chicago Press
The Junior Bible: An American Translation	1936	Goodspeed	Macmillan
The Apocrypha: An American Translation	1938	Goodspeed	University of Chicago Press
The Complete Bible: An American Translation	1939	Powis Smith and Goodspeed	University of Chicago Press
The Apocrypha: An American Translation	1959	Goodspeed	Vintage Books

In the preface to the 1931 edition, Powis Smith and Goodspeed wrote, "The rapid advance of learning in recent years in the fields of history, archaeology, and language has thrown new light upon every part of the Bible. At the same time our changing English speech has carried us farther and farther from the sixteenth-century diction in which all our standard versions of it are clothed. Yet the great messages of the Old and New Testaments were never more necessary than in our present confused and hurried life. We have, therefore, sought to produce a new translation of them, based upon the assured results of modern study, and put in the familiar language of today."

== Reception and legacy ==
The initial reaction to the use of this translation, rather than the King James Bible of the 1600s, was poor, but the idea of a 20th century Bible version was accepted over time.

A similarly named Bible translated by William Beck, was published in 1976. This was a reaction against the Revised Standard Version.

== See also ==
- List of English Bible translations
