= John T. Wilson =

President of the University of Chicago

John Todd Wilson (March 7, 1914 – August 4, 1990) served as 9th president of the University of Chicago from 1975 to 1978.

Wilson was born in Punxsutawney, Pennsylvania on March 7, 1914. He studied at George Washington University and the University of Iowa, where he studied psychology, philosophy, and education. After wartime service in the US Naval Reserve he earned a PhD in psychology from Stanford University in 1948.

After a year working jointly for the American Psychological Association and for George Washington University, he joined the Office of Naval Research and then the newly created National Science Foundation, serving from 1955 to 1961 as assistant director of its Biological and Medical Sciences Division.

In 1961 Wilson moved to work at the University of Chicago as special assistant to the newly appointed university president George W. Beadle, previously of Caltech. In 1963 he moved back to the National Science Foundation as deputy director, returning to the University of Chicago in 1968 as vice-president and dean of faculties. In 1969 he was appointed Provost and elected President of the university in December 1975. He retired in 1978.

Academic offices
Preceded by Edward H. Levi	President of the University of Chicago; 1975–1978	Succeeded by Hanna Holborn Gray
