= Don Michael Randel =

American musicologist

Don Michael Randel (born December 9, 1940) is an American musicologist, specializing in the music of the Middle Ages and Renaissance in Spain and France. He is currently the chair of the board of the American Academy of Arts and Sciences, a trustee of the Carnegie Corporation, and a member of the Encyclopædia Britannica editorial board, and has previously served as the fifth president of the Andrew W. Mellon Foundation, as 12th president of the University of Chicago from 2000 to 2006, Provost of Cornell University, and Dean of Cornell's College of Arts and Sciences. He has served as editor of the third and fourth editions of the Harvard Dictionary of Music, the Harvard Biographical Dictionary of Music, and the Harvard Concise Dictionary of Music and Musicians. He was elected to the American Philosophical Society in 2002.

Randel is a triple alumnus of Princeton University, where he earned his bachelor's, master's and doctoral degrees in musicology. After completing his PhD at Princeton, Randel joined Cornell University as an assistant professor in 1968. In 1991 he accepted the position of Dean of the College of Arts and Sciences, then in 1995 became the provost of Cornell.

On July 1, 2000, Randel succeeded Hugo F. Sonnenschein as president of the University of Chicago. As President, Randel led the Chicago Initiative, a $2 billion capital campaign to solidify the university's financial footing. He also worked to strengthen the academic work of the university in many areas, from humanities and arts to physical and biological sciences, and drove efforts to build stronger ties with community and regional organizations. In 2005, Randel received a $500,000 award from the Carnegie Corporation of New York in recognition of these efforts.

On July 26, 2005, Randel announced that he would leave the University of Chicago to assume the presidency of the Mellon Foundation, where he served from 2006 to 2013.

Academic offices
Preceded by Malden Nesheim	Provost of Cornell University; 1995 – 2000	Succeeded by Carolyn Martin
Preceded by Hugo F. Sonnenschein	President of the University of Chicago; 2000—2006	Succeeded by Robert J. Zimmer
Preceded by William G. Bowen	President of Andrew W. Mellon Foundation; 2006–2013	Succeeded by Earl Lewis
