= Joseph Henry Thayer =

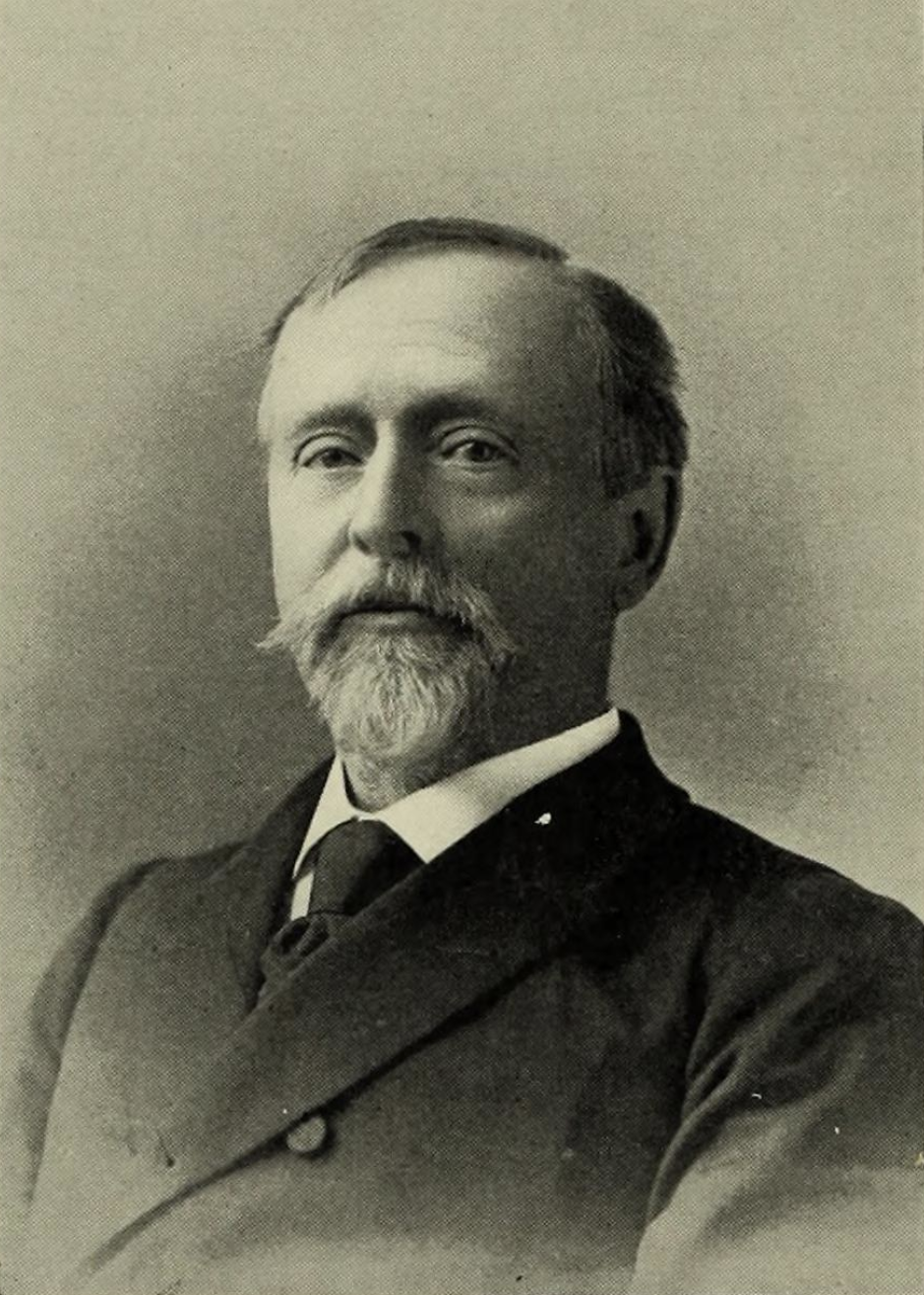
- Born: November 7, 1828; Boston, Massachusetts
- Died: November 26, 1901 (aged 73)
- Education: Boston Latin School; Harvard University (1850); Andover Theological Seminary (1857)
- Occupations: Biblical scholar; professor; pastor

Joseph Henry Thayer (November 7, 1828 – November 26, 1901) was an American Biblical scholar from Boston, Massachusetts.

== Life ==
Joseph Henry Thayer was born in 1828 in Boston. He graduated from Harvard University in 1850 and from Andover Theological Seminary in 1857. From 1858 to 1864 he served as a pastor—first in Quincy, Massachusetts, then in Salem—and served as a chaplain of the 40th Massachusetts Volunteers in the Civil War. After the war, he returned to Massachusetts to become Professor of Sacred Literature at Andover Theological Seminary, where he taught until 1882. In 1884, he began teaching New Testament criticism at Harvard. In 1870, Thayer was a member of the American Bible Revision Committee and recording secretary of the New Testament company (working on the Revised Version).

Thayer's Greek–English Lexicon is a revised and translated edition of C.G. Wilke's Clavis Novi Testamenti - first published in 1841. After numerous revisions by both Wilke and his successor, C.L. Wilibald Grimm, Thayer took over the project. Thayer devoted nearly thirty years to the translation that first appeared in 1885, and updated edition in 1889.

In February 1891 Thayer published a lecture in which he expressed disagreement with the position of biblical inerrancy, asserting that his own acceptance of various errors of history and science in the Bible did not materially detract from his belief in the overall soundness of Christianity.

Thayer was president of the Society of Biblical Literature and Exegesis for 1894 and 1895. In his 1895 presidential address, he called for the creation of an "American School for Oriental Study and Research" in Palestine. Over the next five years, the Society was involved in the establishment of the American School of Oriental Research in Jerusalem. A plaque commemorating Thayer's role in its foundation was placed at the American School in 1933.

== Lectures ==
- The Change of Attitude Toward the Bible, A Lecture Given Under the Auspices of the American Institute of Sacred Literature, February 17, 1891
