= Shadi Bartsch =

American academic

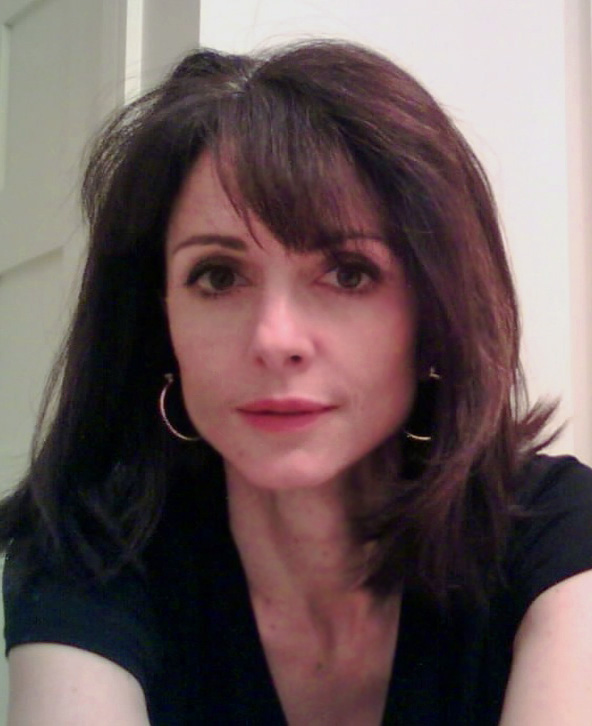
Shadi Bartsch

Shadi Bartsch (born March 17, 1966) is an American historian and professor of classics at the University of Chicago. She has previously held professorships at the University of California, Berkeley and Brown University where she was the MacMillan professor of classics from 2008 to 2009. From 2015 to 2024 she was the Director of the Institute on the Formation of Knowledge (IFK) at the University of Chicago.

== Life ==
Bartsch, the daughter of a UN economist, spent her childhood in London and then Geneva, where she studied at the International School of Geneva. She was also raised in Tehran, Jakarta, and the Fiji Islands. She earned a B.A. with highest honors from Princeton University in 1987 and a Ph.D. in 1992 from the University of California, Berkeley. in classics. She was married to University of Chicago president and mathematician Robert Zimmer from 2011 until his death in 2023.

== Career ==
Bartsch's contributions have been to classical scholarship in the areas of the literature and culture of Julio-Claudian Rome, the ancient novel, Roman stoicism, and the classical tradition. More recently, Bartsch has branched out into the effect of the ancient world on our modern one, especially in Plato Goes to China: The Ancient Greeks and Chinese Nationalism. Bartsch is also the author of an acclaimed translation of Vergil's "Aeneid." She was awarded the Quantrell Award for Excellence in Undergraduate Teaching in the College in 2000 and the Faculty Award for Excellence in Graduate Teaching in 2006 at the University of Chicago. She won an ACLS Fellowship in 1999 and a Guggenheim Fellowship in 2007. She served as chair of the Faculty Board of the University of Chicago Press from 2006 to 2008 and editor-in-chief of both Classical Philology and KNOW. She was appointed the inaugural director of the Institute on the Formation of Knowledge. Bartsch is a Fellow of the British Academy and the American Academy of letters and Sciences.

== Books or Edited Volumes ==
- Decoding the Ancient Novel: The Reader and the Role of Description in Heliodorus and Achilles Tatius (1989)
- Actors in the Audience: Theatricality and Doublespeak from Nero to Hadrian (1994)
- Ideology in Cold Blood: A Reading of Lucan’s Civil War. (1998)
- Oxford Encyclopedia of Rhetoric. (as editor with Thomas Sloane, Heinrich Plett, and Thomas Farrell, 2001)
- Erotikon: Essays on Eros, Ancient and Modern, (as editor with Thomas Bartscherer, 2005)
- The Mirror of the Self: Sexuality, Self-Knowledge, and the Gaze in the Early Roman Empire (2006)
- Ekphrasis (a special issue of Classical Philology, as editor with Jas Elsner, 2007)
- Seneca and the Self, (as editor with David Wray, 2009)
- Persius: A Study in Food, Philosophy, and the Figural (2015; winner of the Charles J. Goodwin award)
- The Cambridge Companion to Seneca, as editor with Alessandro Schiesaro, 2015)
- The Cambridge Companion to the Age of Nero, (as editor with Kirk Freudenburg and Cedric Littlewood, 2017)
- The Chicago Seneca in Translation Series, (as series editor with Martha Nussbaum and Elizabeth Asmis, 2008–2017)
- Virgil's Aeneid: A New Translation (2021)
- Plato Goes to China: The Greek Classics and Chinese Nationalism (2023)
