= Jaś Elsner =

British art historian (born 1962)

Jaś Elsner FBA
- Born: John Richard Elsner; 19 December 1962 (age 63); London, England
- Title: Vice-President of Corpus Christi College, Oxford

Academic background
- Education: King's College, Cambridge; Courtauld Institute of Art

Academic work
- Discipline: Art history and classics
- Sub-discipline: Roman art; Byzantine art; Late antiquity
- Institutions: Courtauld Institute of Art; University of Oxford; Corpus Christi College, Oxford

John Richard "Jaś" Elsner FBA (born 19 December 1962) is a British art historian and classicist, who is Professor of Late Antique Art in the Faculty of Classics at the University of Oxford (since 2014), Humfry Payne Senior Research Fellow in Classical Archaeology and Art at Corpus Christi College, Oxford (since 1999), and Visiting Professor of Art History at the University of Chicago (since 2003). He is mainly known for his work on Roman art, including Late Antiquity and Byzantine art, as well as the historiography of art history, and is a prolific writer on these and other topics.

Elsner has been described as "one of the most well-known figures in the field of ancient art history, respected for his notable erudition, extensive range of interests and expertise, his continuing productivity, and above all, for the originality of his mind", and by Shadi Bartsch, a colleague at Chicago, as "the predominant contemporary scholar of the relationship between classical art and ancient subjectivity".

== Early life and education ==
John Richard Elsner was born on 19 December 1962 in London, England to father Dante Elsner and mother Renee Wistreich, both Polish-born Holocaust survivors. His father was a visual artist and ceramicist.

Elsner graduated with a Bachelor of Arts (BA) from King's College, Cambridge in 1985 and a Master of Arts (MA) in Art History from London's Courtauld Institute of Art in 1987. He returned to King's for his PhD in Classical Art, which he completed in 1990. His doctoral thesis was titled "Art and the Roman viewer: the transformation of art from Augustus to Justinian".

== Academic career ==
Elsner's doctorate was followed by a research fellowship at Jesus College, Cambridge. He then joined the Courtauld Institute of Art in London, where he was lecturer and then reader. He moved to Oxford University in 1999 as Humfry Payne Senior Research Fellow of Corpus Christi College, Oxford. He has had visiting teaching positions at the British School at Rome, the École des Hautes Études en Sciences Sociales in Paris, the Institute for the Humanities at the University of Michigan, and Princeton University. Since 2014, he has been Professor of Late Antique Art at Oxford.

He is director of the Corpus Christi College Centre for the Study of Greek and Roman Antiquity, joint editor of the series of monographs "Greek Culture in the Roman World" for Cambridge University Press, and on the editorial boards of a number of journals. He is the project leader of "Empires of Faith", a five-year research project by the British Museum and the University of Oxford, "to understand the creation of religious iconographies and their relationships with state formation from the Mediterranean World to South Asia and the Borders of China, c. 200–800 AD".

Elsner describes his work as follows: "My main interest is the art of the Roman empire, broadly conceived to include late antiquity and the early middle ages including Byzantium as well as the pre-Christian Classical world. I began my researches by looking at the way art was viewed in antiquity – and this has led to an interest in all kinds of reception from ritual and pilgrimage in the case of religious art to the literary description of art (including the rhetorical technique known as ekphrasis) to the more recent collecting and display of art as well as its modern historiography and receptions. Since the art of antiquity has such a privileged, indeed canonical, position in our culture, the study of its receptions is an exploration of more recent history's varied, competing and often ideologically charged understandings of its own past."

== Personal life ==
Jaś Elsner is married, and has four children. His daughter Maia is a poet and writer.

== Honours ==
In July 2017, Elsner was elected a Fellow of the British Academy (FBA), the United Kingdom's national academy for the humanities and social sciences.

== Selected publications ==
=== Books ===
- Roman Eyes: Visuality and Subjectivity in Art and Text, Princeton (Princeton U.P), 2007
- Imperial Rome and Christian Triumph: The Art of the Roman Empire A.D. 100–450, Oxford: Oxford History of Art (OUP), 1998, ISBN 0-192-84201-3, Google books
- Art and the Roman Viewer: The Transformation of Art from the Pagan World to Christianity, Cambridge, New York and Melbourne (CUP), 1995
- (with Simon Coleman): Pilgrimage Past and Present: Sacred Travel and Sacred Space in the World Religions, London (British Museum Press) and Cambridge Mass. (Harvard University Press), 1995

=== As editor ===
- with Kai Brodersen: Images and Texts on the Artemidorus Papyrus: Working Papers on P. Artemid. (St John's College Oxford, 2008), Historia series – Vol. 214, Franz Steiner Verlag Wiesbaden, 2009, ISBN 3-515-09426-1
- with C. Kraus, Helen Foley, Simon Goldhill: Visualizing the Tragic, Oxford (OUP) 2007
- with Shadi Bartsch: Ekphrasis, Classical Philology 102 (2007)
- with Simon Swain, Stephen J. Harrison: Severan Culture. Cambridge: Cambridge University Press 2007 (Festschrift for Ewen Bowie), ISBN 978-0521859820, Google books
- with Ian Rutherford: Pilgrimage in Greco-Roman and Early Christian Antiquity: Seeing the Gods, Oxford (Oxford University Press), 2005, ISBN 0-199-25079-0, Google books
- Art and text in Roman culture, Cambridge: CUP, 1996, ISBN 0-521-43030-5, google books
- with Roger Cardinal: The Cultures of Collecting, London (Reaktion Books), Cambridge Mass. (Harvard University Press) and Melbourne (Melbourne University Press), 1994. Japanese: Tokyo (Kenkyusha), 1998
- with Jamie Masters: Reflections of Nero. Culture, history and representation. London 1994, ISBN 0-7156-2479-2

=== Selected articles ===
- "Style", in Critical Terms for Art History, ed. Robert S. Nelson and Richard Shiff (Chicago: The University of Chicago Press, 2003), 98–109.
- Physiognomics: Art and Text, in: Simon Swain (ed.), Seeing the Face, Seeing the Soul: Polemon’s Physiognomy from Classical Antiquity to Medieval Islam, Oxford (OUP) 2007, pp. 203–224
- The Rhetoric of Buildings in the De Aedificiis of Procopius, in: E. James (ed.), Art and Text in Byzantium, Cambridge (CUP), 2007, pp. 33–57
- Philostratus Visualises the Tragic: Some Ekphrastic and Pictorial Receptions of Greek Tragedy in the Roman Era, in: C. Kraus, H. Foley, S. Goldhill and J. Elsner (eds.), Visualizing the Tragic, Oxford (OUP) 2007, pp. 309–337
- Viewing Ariadne: From Ekphrasis to Wall Painting in the Roman World, in Classical Philology 102 (2007) pp. 20–44
- Classicism in Roman Art, in: James Porter (ed.), Classical Pasts: The Classical Traditions of Greece and Rome, Princeton (Princeton U.P), 2006, S. 270–297
- Perspectives in Art, in: Noel Lensky (ed.): The Cambridge Companion to the Age of Constantine, Cambridge (CUP), 2006, pp. 255–77, google books
- Reflections on the 'Greek Revolution': From Changes in Viewing to the Transformation of Subjectivity, in: Simon Goldhill and Robin Osborne (eds.): Rethinking Revolutions Through Ancient Greece, Cambridge, 2006, pp. 68–95
- From Empirical Evidence to the Big Picture: Some Reflections on Riegl’s Concept of Kunstwollen, Critical Inquiry 32.4, Summer, 2006. pp. 741–766
- Art and Text, in: Stephen J. Harrison (ed.), A Companion to Latin Literature, Oxford (Blackwell) 2005, pp. 300–318
- Sacrifice and Narrative in the Arch of the Argentarii in Rome, in: Journal of Roman Archaeology 18 (2005) pp. 83–98
- Piety and Passion: Contest and Consensus in the Audiences for Early Christian Pilgrimage, in: J. Elsner and Ian Rutherford (eds.), Pilgrimage in Greco-Roman and Early Christian Antiquity: Seeing the Gods, Oxford (Oxford University Press), 2005, pp. 411–434
- The Birth of Late Antiquity: Riegl and Strzygowski in 1901 in: Art History 25 (2002) pp. 358–379, pp. 419–420
