= Franklin I. Gamwell =

American philosopher (1937–2023)

Franklin I. Gamwell (1937 – 2023) was an American scholar of the philosophy of religion, Christian theology, and philosophical ethics. He was the Shailer Mathews Distinguished Service Professor Emeritus of Religious Ethics, the Philosophy of Religions, and Theology at the Divinity School of the University of Chicago, where he also had served as dean. He was a Presbyterian minister (B.D., Union Theological Seminary) with a strong interest in democracy and justice.

Gamwell also served on the board of directors of Protestants for the Common Good, a nonprofit education and advocacy organization based in Chicago.

== Selected works ==
- Democracy on Purpose: Justice and the Reality of God
- The Divine Good: Modern Moral Theory and the Necessity of God
- The Meaning of Religious Freedom: Modern Politics and the Democratic Resolution
- Politics as a Christian Vocation: Faith and Democracy Today
