= Samuel N. Harper =

Samuel Northrup Harper (April 9, 1882 – January 18, 1943) was an American historian and Slavicist. Son of William Rainey Harper, Samuel N. Harper was an important figure for the establishment and continuation of Russian studies at The University of Chicago.

== Early life and education ==
Harper was born on April 9, 1882, in the Morgan Park neighborhood of Chicago, the eldest son of William Rainey Harper and Ella Paul Harper. His early years were shaped by the founding of the university that would later house him as lecturer. His father became the University of Chicago's first President in 1891. In 1900, Wiliam Rainey visited Russia in the company of Charles R. Crane, a wealthy Chicago businessman particularly interested in Eastern Europe. Among others, William Rainey Harper met tsar Nicholas II and Leo Tolstoy on this trip (the latter was disturbed that the President spent much of his time trying to secure funds for the university). William Rainey Harper returned to Chicago determined to eventually start a program for the study of Russia and also to send his own son abroad to learn a new language. The same year, Samuel N. Harper worked as a guard at the Paris Exposition while it was announced that he was to become the first American expert on Russia.

Harper received a Bachelor of Arts from the University of Chicago in 1902. He received the Diploma from the School of Oriental Languages (Diplôme de l'Ecole des Langues Orientales Vivantes) in Paris in 1905, studying under Paul Jean Marie Boyer, a known specialist in Russian language training.

== Career ==
Samuel N. Harper spent the bulk of Russia's pre-revolutionary years among the intelligentsia of St. Petersburg and Moscow while funded by Charles Crane to teach Russian at the University of Chicago for half of the year, often collaborating on his studies with Bernard Pares. After his father's death, he was assisted by his mother Ella Paul in sorting and archiving his and his father's work – hence meticulous records of the founding of the university, the Russian program, and early 20th-century Russian materials remain in the university's archives.

Harper briefly attended Columbia University between 1909 and 1911. He fell short of finishing his PhD dissertation when Pares suggested for him to come to University of Liverpool to teach Russian while closer to the country itself. The arrangement was short-lived – it became clear that Pares and Harper found themselves on opposing political sides with regard to Russia, Harper later supporting the more moderate reforms of the February Revolution and Pares eventually becoming a public supporter of Stalin. Harper abandoned the post in 1913.

He returned to teaching at the University of Chicago as an assistant professor on Russian Language and Institutions in 1914. He briefly served as Special Assistant to the U.S. State Department, Russian Division from 1918 to 1922, and on the committee that concerned itself with the authenticity of the Sisson Documents.

== Selected bibliography ==
- Russian reader (Chicago, 1906)
- "The Russian Government and the Massacres." Quarterly Review 250 (Oct., 1906): 586-615.
- The New Election Law for the Russian Duma (Chicago, 1908)
- "Exceptional Measures in Russia." The Russian Review I (1912): 92-105.
- Civic Training in Soviet Russia (Chicago, 1929)
- Making Bolsheviks. (Chicago, 1931)
- (editor) The Soviet Union and World Problems. (Chicago, 1935)
