= Sisson Documents =

1918 set of forged documents

The Sisson Documents (Russian: Документы Сиссона, romanized: Dokumenty Sissona) are a set of 68 Russian-language documents obtained in 1918 by Edgar Sisson, the Petrograd representative of the United States Committee on Public Information. Published as The German-Bolshevik Conspiracy, they purported to demonstrate that during World War I, Trotsky and Lenin as well as other Bolshevik leaders were agents directed by the German Empire to bring about Russia's withdrawal from the conflict.

Their authenticity was debated even as they were widely publicized to discredit the Russian Revolution. In 1956, George F. Kennan, in an article in The Journal of Modern History, demonstrated that they were forgeries. Various analyses however, including that of Kennan did not exclude the possibility that the Bolsheviks received some German logistical or financial support up to 1917, as opposed to following the Treaty of Brest-Litovsk in 1918.

== History ==
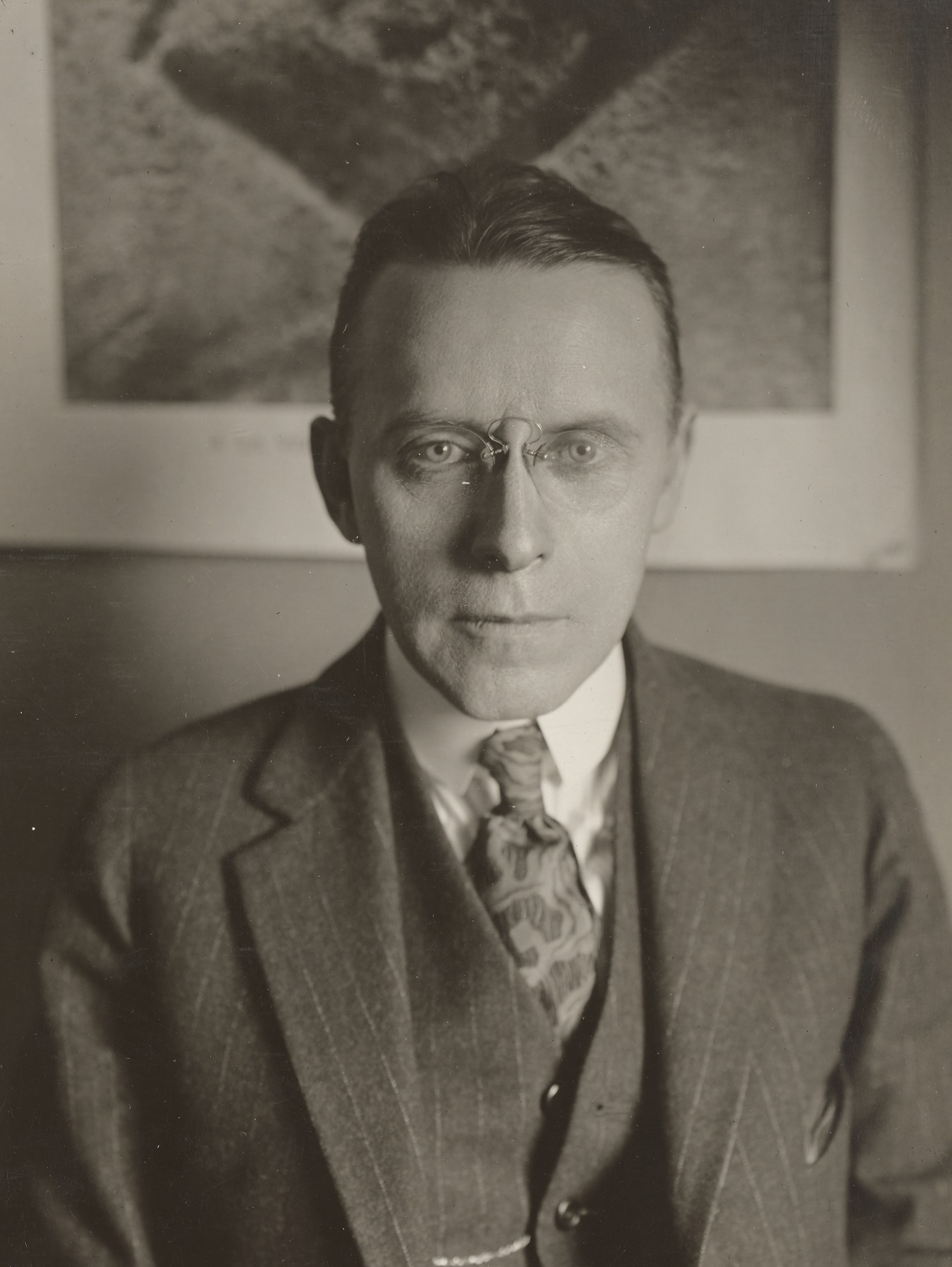
Edgar Sisson, 1919

Sisson had worked as a reporter for the Chicago Tribune, as managing editor of Collier's Weekly, and then as editor of Cosmopolitan before joining the Committee on Public Information (CPI), a wartime unit of the United States government that sought to control information and promote America's war effort principally on the home front but also overseas. He joined the CPI's central administration in April 1917. On October 27 of that year he left the United States for Russia to serve as the CPI's operative there, but he arrived after the Bolsheviks had overthrown the Russian Provisional Government and was frustrated in most of his efforts. He managed to recruit Russians to deliver US propaganda to Germany and also distributed a million Russian-language copies of Woodrow Wilson war message to the US Congress.

He believed his greatest success came when he acquired the Sisson Documents in Petrograd in the spring of 1918. Sisson returned to the US in May and became head of the CPI's Foreign Section in July 1918. His report describing the documents reached Wilson on May 9, 1918, and the administration released them to the American press on September 15. Most of the press reported without question that the German General Staff had hired Lenin and Trotsky and discredited the Russian revolutionaries.

The New York Evening Post challenged the authenticity of the documents on September 21, 1918 by saying that they had originated with Santeri Nuorteva, a well-known propagandist who had worked for the communist government that the Bolsheviks had established in Finland. Newspapers debated their authenticity for months. The New York Times reported the CPI's version of the documents in September, detailed the damaging charges, and claimed:

"that the present heads of the Bolshevist government – Lenin and Trotsky and their associates – are German agents... that the Bolshevist revolt was arranged for by the German Great General Staff and financed by the German Imperial Bank and other German financial institutions... that the Treaty of Brest-Litovsk was a betrayal of the Russian people by German agents, Lenin and Trotsky; that a German-picked "commander" was chosen to defend Petrograd against the Germans; that German officers have been secretly received by the Bolshevist government as military advisers, as spies upon the embassies of Russia's allies, as officers in the Russian army, and as directors of the Bolshevist military, foreign and domestic policy... that the present Bolshevist government is not a Russian government at all, but a German government, acting solely in the interests of Germany, and betraying the Russian people, as it betrays Russia's natural allies, for the benefit of the Imperial German Government alone. And they show also that the Bolshevist leaders... have equally betrayed the working classes of Russia whom they pretend to represent."

The CPI produced a pamphlet based on the Sisson Documents called The German-Bolshevik Conspiracy and distributed 137,000 copies of it. It contained translations, a number of reproductions of the documents, and an analysis made by two prominent scholars for the National Board for Historical Service, J. Franklin Jameson, and Samuel Harper, that determined that most of the documents were genuine, even if a few were questionable. Sisson defended the documents as genuine in his 1931 memoir and again in his 1947 memoir.

After World War II, documents discovered in the German Foreign Office seemed to confirm that Germany had financed the Bolsheviks but did not address the authenticity of the Sisson Documents.

In 1956, George F. Kennan claimed that the Sisson Documents were forgeries in an article. The arguments were largely technical, "ranging from the use of suspicious letterheads and seals, to language discrepancies, to the presence of defunct dating systems..., to apparently forged signatures, and... evidence that the same typewriter had been used to prepare... documents emanating from different offices." Kennan also mentioned logistic arguments. Kennan noted that it was possible the Bolsheviks "received clandestine subsidies from German sources during the summer and early autumn of 1917" but not after the "November Revolution," when the "disintegration of the Russian armed forces–was now an accomplished fact." By then, the Bolsheviks had their own funding sources, and Kennan argued the projected German aid would not have led to subservience on the part of the Bolsheviks.

His analysis of the decades-old controversy attracted little public attention, but it proved more important within the scholarly community. It challenged "the growing tendency in academia and government to conflate all forms of totalitarianism, in particular Nazism and Communism" and questioned the wisdom of scholarship's alliance with national interests.

Kennan's work was expanded in 1990 by Soviet-Russian historian Professor Gennady Sobolev. Among the errors and inaccuracies found indicating falsification of documents, a few basic examples can be considered:

- In the allegedly German document of 25 October 1917 the government formed by the coalition of Bolsheviks and Left SRs was called the Council of People's Commissars, although Lenin, its chairman, began to discuss the question of its name with Trotsky only in the evening of 25 October, and the SNK itself was formed only the next day.
- The names of government bodies and toponyms were used in a "commonplace" and erroneous way (for example, instead of "Department for the Protection of Public Safety and Order in the Capital" it was used "Petersburg Security Department", not taking into account that St. Petersburg was renamed Petrograd back in 1914) and so on and so forth.

According to John Maxwell Hamilton and Meghan McCune, "As with all effective disinformation, their power lay in their plausibility. The documents’ authors enhanced their forgeries with facts. Germans did help the Bolsheviks, funneling millions of Deutsche marks to them during the war. But, as one diplomat noted, the Bolsheviks would have accepted money from anyone. More important, the Bolsheviks sought to foment a communist revolution in Germany as soon as they could."

== See also ==
- Alexander Parvus
- Lenin's journey in a sealed train
- Zinoviev letter
