= List of presidents of the University of Chicago =

Heads of the University of Chicago

President of the University of Chicago
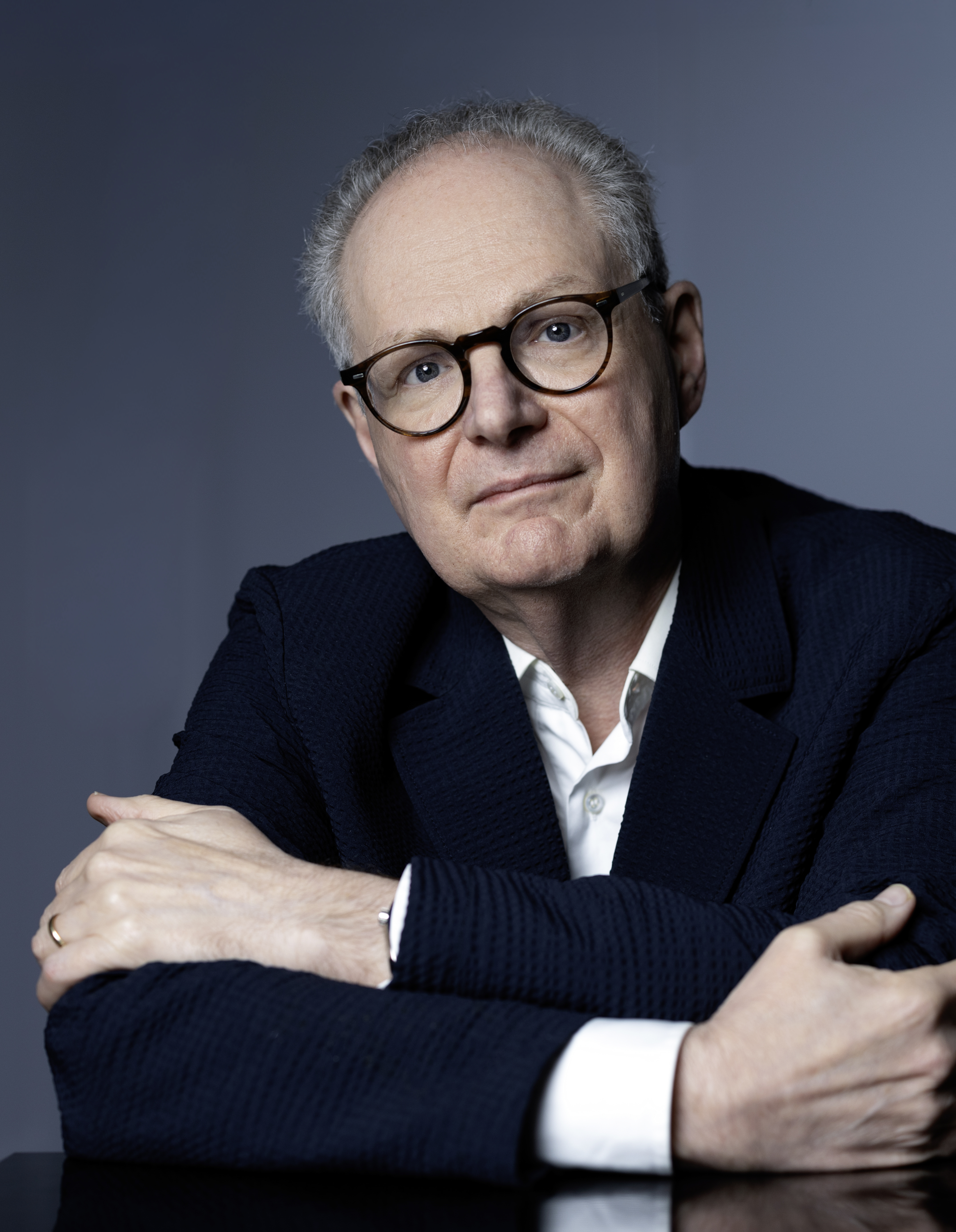
- Incumbent; Paul Alivisatos since September 1, 2021
- Appointer: Board of Trustees
- Term length: At the pleasure of the Board
- Inaugural holder: William Rainey Harper
- Formation: September 18, 1890 (136 years ago)
- Website: president.uchicago.edu

The University of Chicago is a private research university in Chicago, Illinois, United States. The university was incorporated on September 10, 1890, and its trustees elected William Rainey Harper as the first president eight days later. Harper assumed his duties on July 1, 1891, which is the date the university recognizes as its official founding, and classes began on October 1, 1892.

The president is the university's chief executive head and serves as a trustee while in office. Under the university's bylaws, the Board of Trustees elects the president at its annual meeting by a majority vote. The president serves at the Board's pleasure and continues in office until a successor is elected; vacancies may be filled by permanent or acting officers for periods determined by the Board. Subject to the Board's supervision and reserved powers, the president appoints academic and nonacademic staff, oversees the university's physical plant and business activities, carries out measures enacted by the Board and faculties, and serves as the official intermediary between the Board and the faculties and students.

The university's original articles of incorporation required the president and two-thirds of the trustees to be members of Baptist churches. The presidential requirement was removed in 1923, and Max Mason, elected two years later, was the first president selected from outside the university's original faculty. The head of the university was titled president until an administrative reorganization in 1945, when Robert Maynard Hutchins became chancellor and Ernest Cadman Colwell became president as the subordinate administrative chief. The chief-executive title remained chancellor after Hutchins's departure. Under Kimpton, the subordinate presidency was discontinued. The Board restored "president" as the chief executive's title in October 1961, early in George W. Beadle's administration.

Since Harper assumed office, fourteen individuals have served as the university's permanent chief executive. The university's official numbering excludes acting service. Hutchins held the chief-executive office for more than 21 years, the longest tenure, and Hanna Holborn Gray, who took office in 1978 as the first female president of the university, was among the first women to lead a major research university. The incumbent, Paul Alivisatos, became the university's fourteenth president on September 1, 2021. In 2025, the Board extended his term through June 2030.

== Presidents ==
Chief executives of the University of Chicago
No.	Portrait	Name	Office	Term start	Term end	Ref.
1	Black-and-white portrait of William Rainey Harper wearing a suit and round eyeglasses.	William Rainey Harper	President	July 1, 1891	January 10, 1906 (Note: Died in office)	
—		Harry Pratt Judson	Acting president	January 16, 1906	February 20, 1907	
2	Black-and-white portrait of Harry Pratt Judson wearing a dark suit, tie, and round eyeglasses.	Harry Pratt Judson	President	February 20, 1907	February 19, 1923	
—		Ernest DeWitt Burton	Acting president	February 20, 1923	July 12, 1923	
3	Black-and-white portrait of Ernest DeWitt Burton wearing a suit and pince-nez glasses.	Ernest DeWitt Burton	President	July 12, 1923	May 26, 1925 (Note: Died in office)	
—		James Hayden Tufts	Acting president	May 1925	September 1925	
4	Black-and-white portrait of Max Mason wearing a dark suit and tie.	Max Mason	President	October 1, 1925	June 15, 1928	
—		Frederic C. Woodward	Acting president	June 15, 1928	June 30, 1929	
5	Black-and-white head-and-shoulders photograph of Robert Maynard Hutchins wearing a suit and tie.	Robert Maynard Hutchins	President (1929–1945); chancellor (1945–1951)	July 1, 1929	June 30, 1951 (Note: Hutchins went on leave on January 1, 1951. Colwell and then Kimpton led the university in acting capacities before Hutchins's resignation took effect on June 30.)	
—		Ernest Cadman Colwell	Acting chancellor (Note: Colwell held the subordinate presidency beginning in 1945 and simultaneously served as acting chancellor during this interval.)	January 1, 1951	April 12, 1951	
—		Lawrence A. Kimpton	Acting chancellor	April 12, 1951	October 18, 1951	
6		Lawrence A. Kimpton	Chancellor	October 18, 1951	September 7, 1960	
—		R. Wendell Harrison	Acting chancellor	September 8, 1960	March 1961	
7	Black-and-white photograph of George Beadle wearing a suit and tie at a public meeting.	George W. Beadle	Chancellor (March–October 1961); president (October 1961–1968)	March 1961	November 14, 1968	
8	Black-and-white photograph of Edward H. Levi wearing a dark suit and tie.	Edward H. Levi	President	November 14, 1968	February 1975 (Note: Resigned to become United States Attorney General in the Ford administration)	
—		John T. Wilson	Acting president	February 1975	December 9, 1975	
9		John T. Wilson	President	December 9, 1975	July 1, 1978	
10	Photograph of Hanna Holborn Gray wearing a dark jacket and pearl necklace.	Hanna Holborn Gray	President	July 1, 1978	June 30, 1993	
11		Hugo F. Sonnenschein	President	July 1, 1993	June 30, 2000	
12		Don Michael Randel	President	July 1, 2000	June 30, 2006	
13	Photograph of Robert Zimmer wearing a dark suit and patterned tie.	Robert J. Zimmer	President	July 1, 2006	August 31, 2021	
14	Color portrait of Paul Alivisatos wearing round glasses and a dark jacket.	Paul Alivisatos	President	September 1, 2021	Incumbent	
