= Robert Zimmer =

American mathematician (1947–2023)

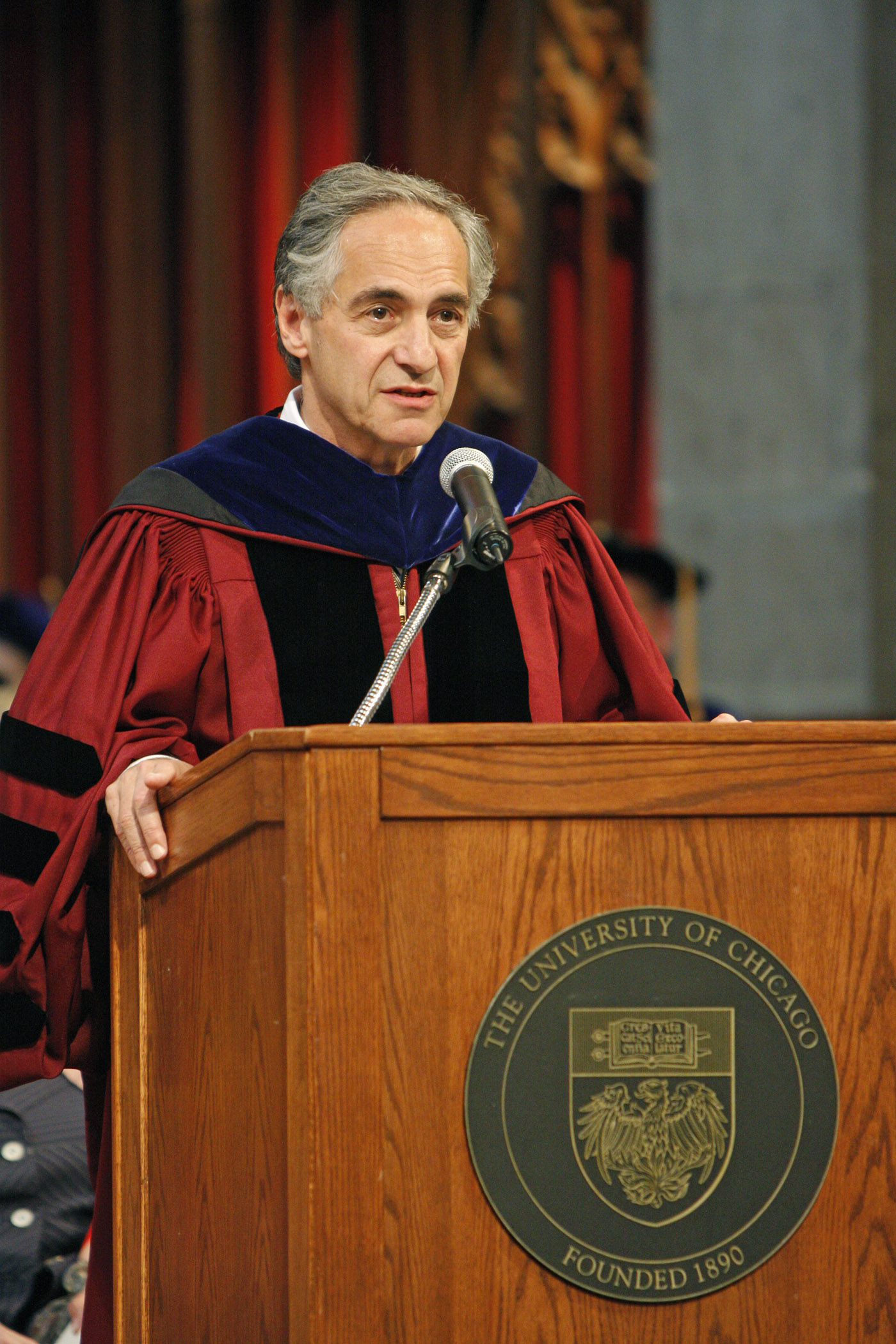
- Zimmer in 2009

3rd Chancellor of the University of Chicago
- In office September 1, 2021 – July 7, 2022
- Preceded by: Position reestablished
- Succeeded by: Position abolished

13th President of the University of Chicago
- In office July 1, 2006 – August 31, 2021
- Preceded by: Don Michael Randel
- Succeeded by: A. Paul Alivisatos

Personal details
- Born: Robert Jeffrey Zimmer; November 5, 1947 New York City, New York, U.S.
- Died: May 23, 2023 (aged 75) Chicago, Illinois, U.S.
- Spouses: Terese Schwartzman (divorced); Shadi Bartsch (m. 2011)
- Children: 3
- Education: Brandeis University (BA); Harvard University (MA, PhD)

Robert Jeffrey Zimmer (November 5, 1947 – May 23, 2023) was an American mathematician and academic administrator. He served as the 13th president of the University of Chicago from July 2006 to August 2021 and as the honorary 3rd chancellor of the university from September 2021 to July 2022.

His academic research focused on geometry, particularly ergodic theory, Lie groups, and differential geometry.

== Education and work experience ==
Zimmer graduated from New York's Stuyvesant High School in 1964. He matriculated to Brandeis University as an undergraduate, earning a B.A., summa cum laude, in 1968. He conducted his mathematics graduate study at Harvard University, receiving a master's degree in 1971 and a Ph.D. in 1975, under the supervision of George Mackey.

He taught at the United States Naval Academy from 1975 to 1977, and moved to the mathematics department of the University of Chicago in 1977. From 1981 to 1983, he was a professor in the mathematics department of University of California, Berkeley. He was on the mathematics faculty and held several administrative positions at the University of Chicago, including Chairman of the Department of Mathematics, Deputy Provost, and Vice President for Research and Argonne National Laboratory, before he moved to Brown University as provost in 2002. He returned to the University of Chicago as president in 2006.

=== University of Chicago presidency ===
As president, Zimmer pushed for major academic initiatives at Chicago, including increased financial aid for students in the undergraduate College and the elimination of loans from financial aid packages; increased funding for doctoral students, particularly in humanities and social sciences; the University of Chicago's first engineering program, which began as the Institute for Molecular Engineering and is now the Pritzker School of Molecular Engineering; new programs and facilities in the arts; and the establishment of the Becker-Friedman Institute for Research in Economics, the Neubauer Family Collegium for Culture and Society, and the Stevanovich Institute on the Formation of Knowledge. During Zimmer's presidency, the University of Chicago expanded its presence locally with the launch of the Urban Education Institute and globally with the launch of the Center in Beijing, the Center in Delhi, and The Hong Kong Jockey Club University of Chicago Academic Complex/The University of Chicago Francis and Rose Yuen Campus in Hong Kong.

Under Zimmer's administration applications to the undergraduate College increased from under 10,000 in 2006 to over 32,000 in 2018. The university adopted a policy of meeting full financial need of its undergraduate students with no loan expectations, creating the capacity for them to graduate debt-free. Recent efforts to increase access to the university include UChicago Promise, which provides aid and college guidance to students in the city of Chicago; the Neubauer Family Adelante Programs, which offers financial support for students engaged in Hispanic/Latino communities; the UChicago Emerging Rural Leaders Program, which offers on-campus programming, mentoring, and financial aid for students from rural communities; and the Office for Military-Affiliated Communities, which supports programs and partnerships for recruitment, enrollment and other services for veterans and their dependents.

During Zimmer's tenure the University of Chicago received six gifts of $100 million or more (totaling $850M): an anonymous $100 million donation to fund the undergraduate Odyssey scholarship program; a $300 million donation to the University of Chicago Booth School of Business; a $100 million donation to establish The Pearson Institute for the Study and Resolution of Global Conflicts and The Pearson Global Forum at the Harris School of Public Policy Studies; a $150 million for the Kenneth C. Griffin Department of Economics; $100 million for the Duchossois Family Institute: Harnessing the Microbiome and Immunity for Human Health; and a $100 million donation to initially establish and fund the Pritzker School of Molecular Engineering.

In 2014, Zimmer formed the Committee on Freedom of Expression whose report came to be known as the Chicago principles, a set of guidelines intended to demonstrate The University of Chicago's commitment to freedom of speech. The Chicago Principles were adopted by more than 65 colleges and universities. As Zimmer noted in an address to the Chicago Humanities Festival in 2017, the work of faculty and students to confront new and different ideas through education and research "only happens at the highest level in an environment of rigor, questioning, and free and open discourse." Zimmer also spoke on the importance of these ideas in the keynote address at the University of Vienna's Academic Freedom in the Digital Age conference.

Under Zimmer's guidance, the University of Chicago sent a letter to incoming freshmen in August 2016 telling them that "we do not support so-called trigger warnings, we do not cancel invited speakers because their topics might prove controversial, and we do not condone the creation of intellectual safe spaces where individuals can retreat from ideas and perspectives at odds with their own."

An Associated Press report found Zimmer to be the highest-paid college president in the United States in 2011, with total compensation of $3.4 million in that year.

On August 13, 2020, Zimmer announced that he would step down as president at the conclusion of the 2020–2021 academic year and that he would shift to the role of chancellor; he originally had planned to serve through 2022, but acknowledged that brain surgery he had undergone in May 2020 had accelerated his transition. On July 7, 2022, he stepped down from his role as chancellor to focus on his health.

== Mathematical work ==
Zimmer's work centered on group actions on manifolds and more general spaces, with applications to topology and geometry. Much of his work was in the area now known as the "Zimmer Program" which aims to understand the actions of semisimple Lie groups and their discrete subgroups on differentiable manifolds.

Crucial to this program is "Zimmer's cocycle superrigidity theorem", a generalization of Grigory Margulis's superrigidity theorem. Like Margulis's work, which greatly influenced Zimmer, it uses ergodic theory as a central technique in the case of invariant measures. It led to many results within the Zimmer Program, although many of the main conjectures remain open. In addition to Margulis, Zimmer was greatly influenced by the work of Mikhail Gromov on rigid transformation groups and he extended and connected Gromov's theory to the Zimmer Program.

Zimmer collaborated with a number of mathematicians to apply the ideas from the Zimmer Program to other areas of mathematics. His collaboration with Alexander Lubotzky applied some of these ideas to arithmetic results on fundamental groups of manifolds. In collaboration with François Labourie and Shahar Mozes, cocycle superrigidity ideas were applied to the basic problem of the existence of compact locally homogeneous spaces of certain types. His collaboration with Amos Nevo concerned actions with stationary measure and provided certain basic structure theorems for such actions of higher rank semisimple groups. Zimmer's earlier work provided a proof of a conjecture of Alain Connes on orbit equivalence of actions of semisimple groups, and introduced the basic notion of amenable group action.

== Personal life ==
Zimmer was married to Terese Schwartzman, former director of strategic initiatives for the university's Urban Education Institute, but they separated in September 2009 and later divorced. They had three sons. In October 2011, he married University of Chicago classics professor Shadi Bartsch.

Zimmer was diagnosed with glioblastoma in May 2020. He died in Chicago on May 23, 2023, at age 75.

== Honors ==
- Zimmer was an elected member of the American Academy of Arts and Sciences and a fellow of the American Mathematical Society.
- Zimmer received honorary Doctorates from Tsinghua University (April 2011), Colby College (September 2014), and his alma mater Brandeis University (May 2021).
- In 2017 Zimmer received the 13th annual Philip Merrill Award for Outstanding Contributions to Liberal Arts Education from the American Council of Trustees and Alumni.
- In 2023 Zimmer received the Clark Kerr Award for distinguished leadership in higher education from the UC Berkeley Academic Senate.

== See also ==
- Zimmer's conjecture
- Paul Alivisatos
