= Harry Pratt Judson =

American historian (1849–1927)

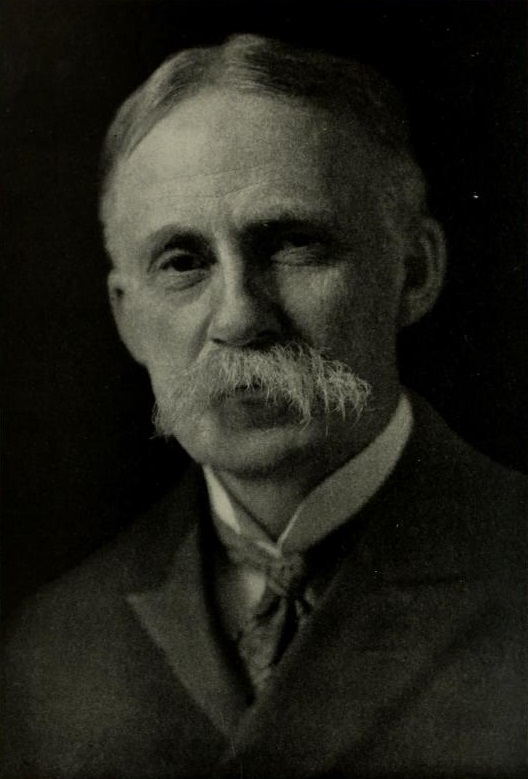
Portrait of Harry Pratt Judson.

Harry Pratt Judson (December 20, 1849 – March 4, 1927) was an American educator and historian who served as the second president of the University of Chicago from 1907 to 1923.

== Biography ==
Judson was born at Jamestown, New York and educated at Williams College (A.B., 1870; A.M., 1883), where he was a brother of the Delta Kappa Epsilon fraternity (Epsilon chapter). Judson taught at Troy High School in Troy, New York, from 1870 to 1885 and was professor of history and lecturer on pedagogics at the University of Minnesota from 1885 to 1892.

Moving to the University of Chicago in 1892, Judson became professor of political science and head dean of the colleges and in 1894 was named head of the department of political science and dean of the faculty of arts, literature, and science. He served as acting president of the University of Chicago from 1906 to 1907 and was named the university's second president in 1907, serving until 1923. During his tenure, Judson forced Georgiana Simpson (the second Black woman to receive a PhD) to move off-campus after several white students complained about her presence in the dorms.

Judson became a member of the General Education Board in 1906 and of the Rockefeller Foundation in 1913.

== Publications ==
Besides editing a series of readers, he is author of:

- History of the Troy Citizens' Corps (1884).
- Cæsar's Army (1888).
- Europe in the Nineteenth Century (1894; third edition, revised, 1901).
- The Growth of the American Nation (1895; second edition, 1900).
- The Higher Education as a Training for Business (1896; second edition, 1911).
- The Government of Illinois (1900).
- The Essentials of a Written Constitution (1903).
- Our Federal Republic (1925).

Academic offices
Preceded by William Rainey Harper	President of the University of Chicago; 1907–1923	Succeeded by Ernest DeWitt Burton
