= Nicholas Polson =

British statistician (born 1963)

Nicholas Polson (born 7 May 1963) is a British statistician who is a professor of econometrics and statistics at the University of Chicago Booth School of Business. His works are primarily in Bayesian statistics, Markov chain Monte Carlo and Sequential Monte Carlo, (aka Particle filter). Polson earned a master's degree with first-class honours from Worcester College, Oxford, in 1984, PhD from the University of Nottingham, where his supervisor was Adrian Smith.

== Research ==
Polson's research is in Bayesian statistics, computational methods and machine learning. He is known for three lines of work.

=== Horseshoe prior ===
With Carlos Carvalho and James Scott, Polson introduced the horseshoe prior, a global-local shrinkage prior for sparse signal recovery. It shrinks noise strongly toward zero while leaving large signals largely unshrunk. An earlier version appeared at AISTATS 2009.

=== Pólya-Gamma data augmentation ===
With Scott and Jesse Windle, Polson developed a data-augmentation scheme based on Pólya-Gamma latent variables. It gives an exact Gibbs sampler for Bayesian logistic and related models.

=== Deep learning ===
Polson has written on deep learning from a Bayesian and statistical viewpoint, including a review with Vadim Sokolov and an application of deep architectures to short-term traffic flow prediction. Later work by Polson and Sokolov arguing that the success of heavily over-parameterized AI models is consistent with Bayesian statistical theory was covered in Chicago Booth Review.

Polson has also applied deep learning to finance. With J. B. Heaton and Jan Hendrik Witte, he proposed "deep portfolios", which use autoencoders and deep architectures for portfolio construction, index tracking and smart indexing.

== Books ==
With James Scott, Polson wrote AIQ: How People and Machines Are Smarter Together (2018), a popular account of the history and mechanics of artificial intelligence.

== Selected publications ==
- Eraker, B., M. Johannes and N.G. Polson, "The Impact of Jumps in Volatility in Returns," (2003) Journal of Finance, 58, 3, 1269–1300.
- Carlin, B.P., N.G. Polson and D.S. Stoffer, "A Monte Carlo Approach to Non-Normal and Non-Linear State Space Modelling" (1992) Journal of the American Statistical Association, 87, 493–500.
