= American Institute of Sacred Literature =

American adult education institution

- Other name: AISL
- Founder: William Rainey Harper
- Established: 1880
- Focus: Adult education of religious texts
- Owner: University of Chicago
- Formerly called: Institute of Hebrew
- Location: Chicago, Illinois, U.S.
- Dissolved: 1948

American Institute of Sacred Literature (acronym, AISL; previously, Institute of Hebrew; 1880–1948) was an American adult education institution which focused on Christian and related religious texts. The work of the Institute embraced:

- Popular education in the religious field through the distribution of large numbers of leaflets and pamphlets.
- Courses of prescribed reading for ministers, religious workers, and laymen, with the circulation of traveling libraries, sixteen in number.
- Elementary study courses with or without a correspondence feature for individuals or groups, sixteen in number. The institute, published monthly, presented a new course in this series annually.
- Correspondence courses giving University credit.

== History ==
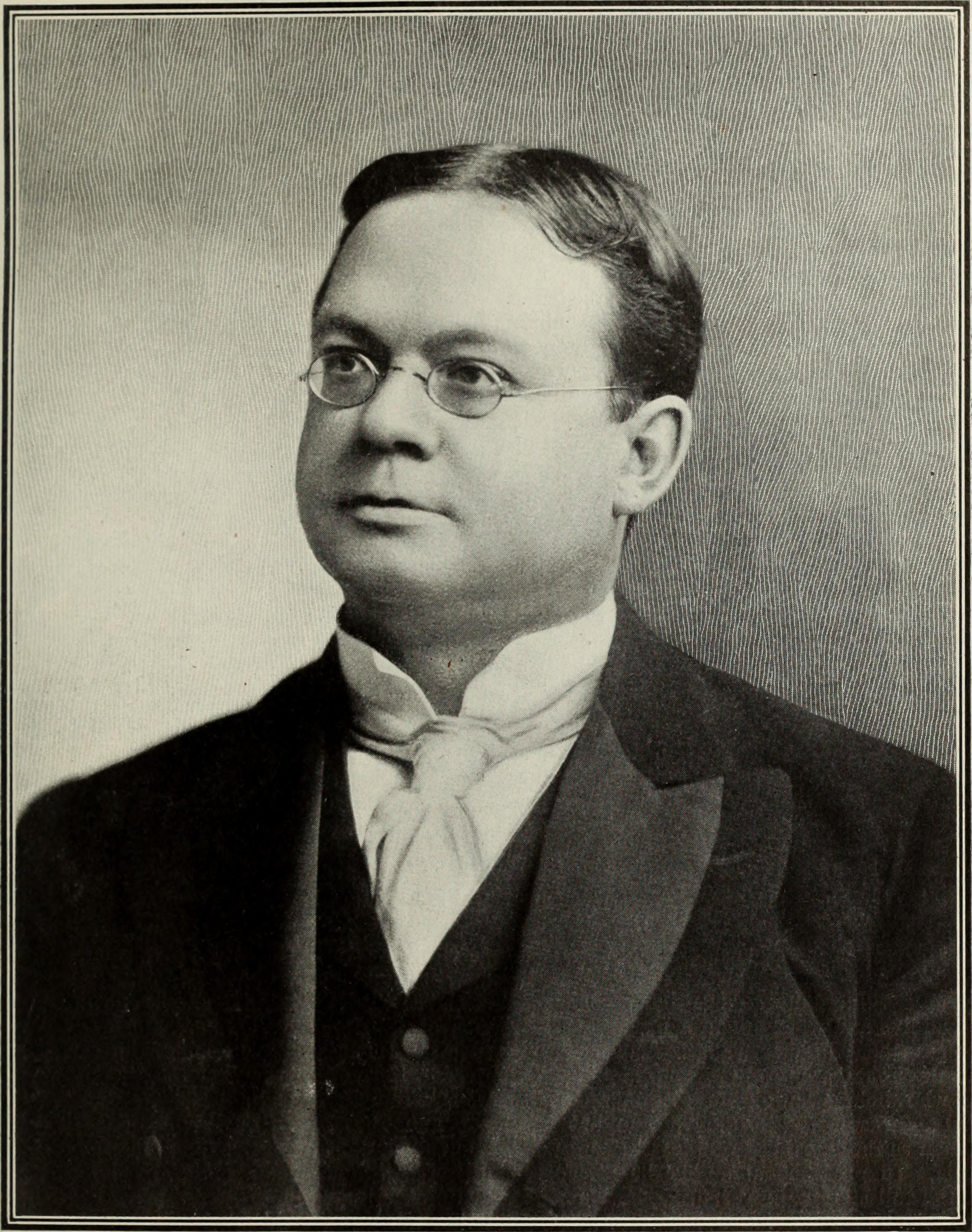
William Rainey Harper

In February 1881, a correspondence school of Hebrew was organized by William Rainey Harper under the name of the Institute of Hebrew. Twenty students constituted the initial class. The institute was encouraged and fostered in its work by about 70 teachers of Hebrew and the Old Testament connected with educational institutions throughout the U.S. The student body increased so rapidly that its first year, 44 states and eight foreign countries were represented. It became increasingly evident that the opportunities of the school must be extended to students of the English Bible.

In 1889, a reorganization was effected, and an institution having a much broader purpose was established under the name of The American Institute of Sacred Literature. The first prospectus of the new organization states its purpose as follows: "To promote the philological, literary, historical, and exegetical study of the Scriptures by means of such instrumentalities as may be found practicable." This ideal did not change, although changing circumstances and demands involved modifications in methods and work.

In 1891, the headquarters of the Institute were removed to Chicago.

== Council of Seventy ==
The Council of Seventy was organized in 1895, in New York City, and this body assumed the direction of the institute. The organization was not endowed, and after ten years, the Council of Seventy unanimously consented to accept the opportunity given them by the trustees of the University of Chicago to incorporate the Institute in the University Extension division of the university and to continue its work under the advantages offered by association with a well-established educational institution. The first annual meeting of the Council of Seventy was held in Chicago, December 9, 1896; the second, January 14, 1898; the third, March 4, 1899.

The purpose of the council was (1) to associate more closely those who desire to promote the study of the Bible from the historical standpoint, and of other sacred literatures as related to it; (2) to induce properly qualified persons to undertake this work either independently or in connection with another calling; (3) to extend through the AISL a wider acquaintance with the right methods of Bible study and their results; (4) to direct the affairs of said institute.

The council was divided into three chambers, one having in charge the work connected with the Old Testament, another having in charge the work connected with the New Testament, and a third having in charge the work connected with sacred literatures in general.

The transfer to the University of Chicago was formally consummated July 1, 1905.

== Purpose and organization ==
It was the province of the Institute as a whole to conduct all non-residence work of whatever character in subjects pertaining to "sacred literature". It was the purpose of the university to provide through the institute, for churches, schools, pastors, teachers, and the general Christian public, facilities for non-resident study in the Bible and kindred subjects in such a variety of forms, grades, and topics that satisfactory aid may be given to any person or group of persons seeking assistance, advice, or training in topics associated with religious education. The officers of administration were the President of the university, the Secretary of the institute, and an executive committee from the Divinity School faculty.

== Fields of work ==
The AISL stood for no special theory of interpretation, school of criticism, or denomination. It promoted a systematic knowledge of the Bible as interpreted in the best light of the era, and to increase the facilities for obtaining such knowledge. It worked in harmony with all Christian denominations and organizations for Christian work. Specifically, the divisions and subdivisions of the institute work were as follows:

1. Correspondence work.—The correspondence instruction was given by men of university and theological training. It was conducted by means of printed instruction sheets sent to the student weekly. The recitations, written out in accordance with the instructions, were returned to the instructor, examined and criticized by him, and again returned to the student with further suggestions. Between 1878 and 1899, about 1,000 persons received instruction in the department. A large proportion of these completed courses and received certificates. The work was not confined to U.S. and Great Britain, but was carried among Christian missionaries into Australia, Africa, and China.
2. Reading work. The Bible Students' Reading Guild: This Guild aimed to provide reading courses, both popular and professional, upon Biblical and theological topics. The Outline Bible Club course for Christian organizations.
3. Examination work.-In order to stimulate such study of the Bible as is not carried on directly in connection with the institute, certain annual examinations are offered as follows: An examination in connection with the International Sunday School Lessons. To undergraduate college students in (a) Hebrew; (b) New Testament Greek; (c) a specific Biblical subject (English).
4. Summer schools.-The summer schools of the institute are usually held in connection with other institutions or organizations, the number of courses and the character of the work depending upon the desire and financial resources of each institution or organization. It is the purpose of the institute to organize independent summer schools, where it seems wise to do so.
5. Lecture work.-Biblical lectures are given under the auspices of the institute (a) in courses, in cooperation with university extension organizations; (b) in courses, in colleges and local institutes; (c) as single lectures and addresses at conventions and elsewhere.
6. Local board work.-Local boards of the institute, whose duty it is to propagate the work of the institute in their respective localities, are organized in several of the larger cities.
7. Publication work.-The institute publishes all its own instruction sheets. Outline inductive studies, supplemental to the International Sunday School Lessons, have been furnished to the Sunday School Times for five years. Series of studies are also provided for other periodicals. It is the province of this department to provide supplementary material for the reading courses when necessary.
