= John Merlin Powis Smith =

American academic (1866–1932)

J. M. Powis Smith
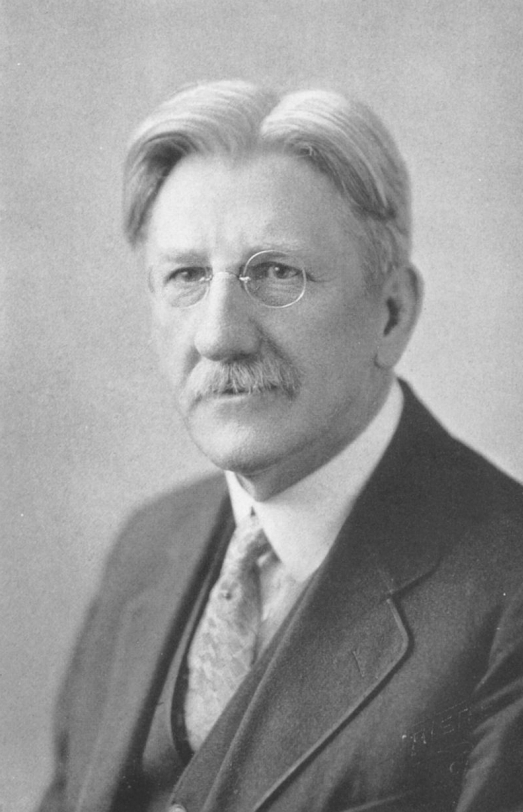
- J. M. P. Smith
- Born: 28 December 1866; London, England
- Died: 26 September 1932 (aged 65); Chicago, Illinois, U.S.
- Education: University of Chicago
- Scientific career
- Fields: Oriental studies Old Testament
- Workplaces: University of Chicago

John Merlin Powis Smith (28 December 1866 – November 1932) was an English-born, American orientalist and biblical scholar.

Smith was born in London, son of William Martin and Anne Powis Smith. He was orphaned at age five and thereafter raised by his aunt in Herefordshire and Devonshire. After finishing school, Smith passed an examination for entrance to Cambridge, but was unable to secure funding for his studies and migrated to America in 1883.

Having migrated to America, Smith lived on the farm of an uncle in Denison, Iowa. In 1890 he became a Baptist. While attending college in Iowa, Smith also taught introductory Greek, and after earning his Bachelor of Arts degree in 1893, taught Greek at Cedar Valley Seminary in Osage, Iowa. He enrolled as a graduate student at the University of Chicago in 1894. During his time at the Divinity School he studied Hebrew, Biblical Aramaic, Syriac, Arabic, Akkadian and Sumerian. Smith completed his doctoral dissertation on "The History of the Idea of the Day of Yahweh" in 1899.

Smith was then singled out for the Department of Semitic Languages by the president of the university and fellow orientalist, William Rainey Harper, with whom a close professional and personal relationship developed as Smith served as Harper's literary secretary and assisted him with the International Critical Commentary on the Minor Prophets (editorship of the second and third volumes of which would fall to Smith after Harper's death). Smith went on to become instructor in 1905, assistant professor in 1908, associate professor in 1912 and then, in 1915, full professor of Old Testament language and literature. Neither Chicago Theological Seminary nor Meadville Theological School made provisions for their own professors of Old Testament, as they were more than content to rely upon the excellent teaching provided by Smith.

Smith also served as an editorial secretary of the Biblical World and was made the editor of the American Journal of Semitic Languages and Literatures in 1915. Smith played a major role in the renamed Department of Oriental Languages, seeing its transition from being concerned almost exclusively with philology to also include the historical aspect of Oriental studies. Smith thereby laid the foundations, along with James Henry Breasted, for the formation of the Oriental Institute at the University of Chicago.

In 1927, Smith was appointed annual professor at the American School of Oriental Research in Jerusalem. Smith and Edgar J. Goodspeed were first graduate students together, then colleagues at the University of Chicago, and the two served together on the American Standard Bible Committee charged with the revision of the American Standard Version (ASV). Smith was also the editor of the translation of the Old Testament that accompanied Goodspeed's translations of the deuterocanonical books and the New Testament in The Bible: An American Translation, which was published after Smith's death. Smith was an honorary member of the Oxford Society for Old Testament Study and, at his death, was president of the Society of Biblical Literature and Exegesis.

On 19 September 1899, Smith married Catherine McKlveen in Chariton, Iowa. Smith also served as a deacon at Hyde Park Baptist Church.

== Works ==
- 1901 The Day of Yahveh (Chicago 1901) (two editions) (the published version of Smith's doctoral dissertation)
- 1908 Books for Old Testament Study
- 1908 The Universal Element in the Psalter
- 1911 A Critical and Exegetical Commentary on Micah, Zephaniah and Nahum
- 1912 A Critical and Exegetical Commentary on Haggai, Zechariah, Malachi, and Jonah
- 1914 The Prophet and His Problems
- 1914 The Bible for Home and School - multivolume series
- 1914 A Commentary on the Books of Amos, Hosea, and Micah
- 1917 The Problem of Suffering in the Old Testament
- 1922 The Religion of the Psalms
- 1923 The Moral Life of the Hebrews
- 1925 The Prophets and Their Times
- 1926 The Psalms Translated by J. M. Powis Smith
- 1927 The Old Testament An American Translation by Alexander R. Gordon, Theophile J. Meek, J. M. Powis Smith, Leroy Waterman. Edited by J. M. Powis Smith
- 1931 The Origin and History of Hebrew Law (Chicago: University Press)
- 1931 The Bible An American Translation + The Old Testament Translated by a group of Scholars under the editorship of J. M. Powis Smith. The New Testament Translated by Edgar J. Goodspeed
