= William Rainey Harper =

American semiticist, university administrator and Baptist minister (1856–1906)

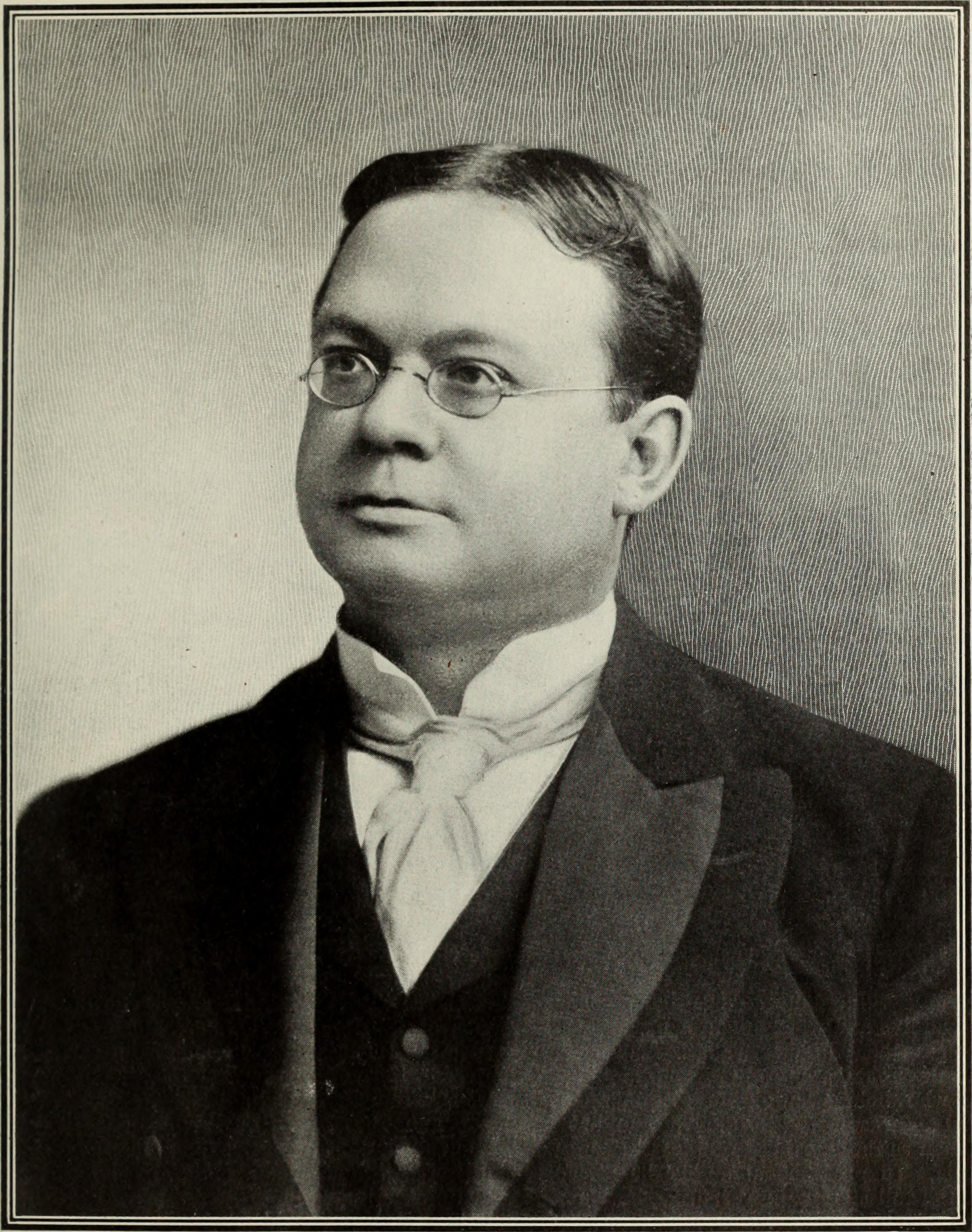

Inaugural President of the University of Chicago
- In office 1891–1906
- Succeeded by: Harry Pratt Judson

Personal details
- Born: July 24, 1856 New Concord, Ohio, U.S.
- Died: January 10, 1906 (aged 49) Chicago, Illinois, U.S.
- Spouse: Ella Paul Harper
- Children: 4
- Education: Muskingum College; Yale University
- Profession: Scholar and educational administrator

William Rainey Harper (July 24, 1856 – January 10, 1906) was an American academic, an accomplished semiticist, and Baptist clergyman. A Yale University professor, Harper helped to establish both the University of Chicago and Bradley University and served as the inaugural president of both institutions. He served as the inaugural president of the University of Chicago from 1891 to 1906.

== Early life ==
Harper was born on July 24, 1856, in New Concord, Ohio, (Note: The original log cabin that was William Rainey Harper's birthplace has been preserved and is located in New Concord, across from the main gate of Muskingum College.) to parents of Irish-Scottish ancestry. Very early in his life, Harper displayed skills years ahead of other children of his age, and he was labeled a child prodigy. By the age of eight, Harper began preparing for college-level courses. At the age of ten he enrolled in Muskingum College in his native New Concord. At the age of fourteen, he graduated from Muskingum College. In 1872, Harper enrolled in Yale University to begin his postgraduate studies, and he completed his PhD there in 1875. Harper quickly assumed a series of faculty positions, including ones at the Masonic College in Macon, Tennessee, Denison University and Yale University.

Throughout his academic life, Harper wrote numerous textbooks. A strong supporter of lifelong learning, Harper was also involved with the Chautauqua Institution in Chautauqua, New York, and its academic programs starting in 1883.

== Personal life ==
William Rainey Harper married Ella Paul Harper in 1875. They were the parents of three sons, Samuel Northrup, Paul, and Donald, and one daughter, Davida.

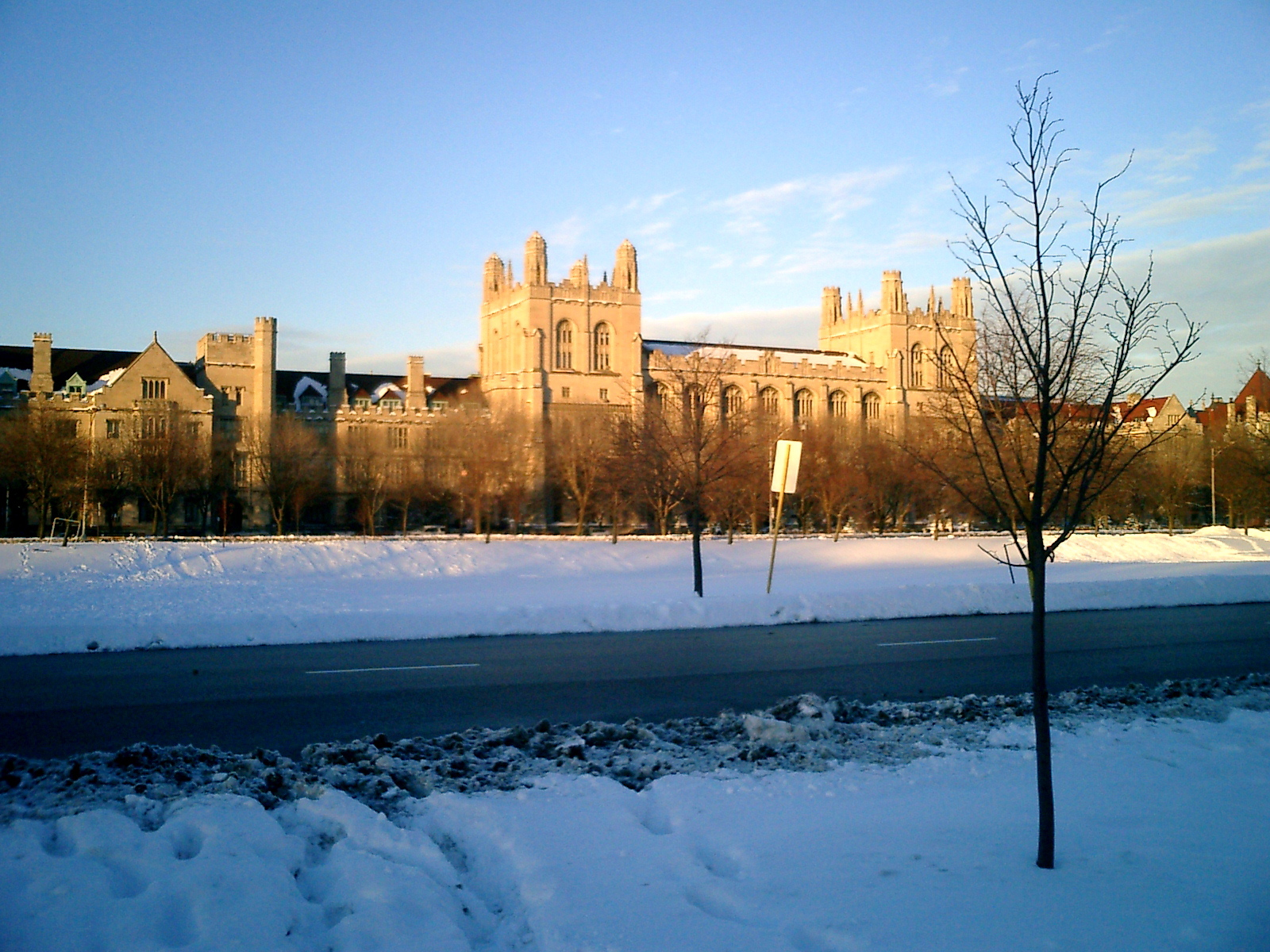
Harper Library at the University of Chicago

== As University of Chicago president ==
In 1891, John D. Rockefeller selected thirty-five-year-old Harper to assist in organizing the University of Chicago, and shortly thereafter, he was selected as the university's first president. Harper also had expert knowledge of every department of education as well as business acumen, and he was a very powerful public speaker. In hiring the faculty of the new university and selecting its students, Harper set standards quite high. Harper elevated the salaries of the faculty members above those of ordinary schoolteachers, and by doing so attracted the best scholars of all disciplines to the university.

=== Academic innovations ===
Harper founded the nation's first departments of Egyptology and sociology at Chicago and established the University of Chicago Press. He also instituted the nation's first extension school, enabling those who worked during the day to attend classes at night and on weekends. Harper is also attributed with first organizing the academic quarter system on behalf of John D. Rockefeller in 1891. One of Harper's ideas, that many would benefit by taking the first two years of college in their hometowns, led to the founding of American community colleges.

In the 1890s, Harper, fearful that the vast resources of the University of Chicago would injure smaller schools by drawing away good students, established an affiliation program with several regional colleges and universities, including Des Moines College, Kalamazoo College, Butler College, and Stetson University. Under the terms of the affiliation, the schools were required to have courses of study comparable to those at the University of Chicago; to notify the University early of any contemplated faculty appointments or dismissals; to make no faculty appointment without the University of Chicago's approval; and to send copies of examinations to the University for suggestions and improvements prior to distribution. The University of Chicago agreed to confer a degree on any graduating senior from an affiliated school who made a grade of A for all four years and on any other graduate who took twelve weeks additional study at the University of Chicago. A student or faculty member of an affiliated school was entitled to free tuition at the University of Chicago, and Chicago students were eligible to attend an affiliated school on the same terms and receive credit for their work. The University of Chicago also agreed to provide affiliated schools with books and scientific apparatus and supplies at cost; to provide special instructors and lecturers without cost except travel expenses; and to provide a copy of every book and journal published by the University of Chicago Press to the libraries of the affiliated schools at no cost. The agreement provided that either party could terminate the affiliation on proper notice. Several University of Chicago professors disliked the program, as it required uncompensated additional labor from them and cheapened Chicago's academic reputation. After Harper's death in 1906, the program was gradually discontinued, and it had passed into history by 1910.

=== Religious education ===
With his background as a Semiticist and Baptist clergyman, Harper believed that the University's programs should include religious study. Accordingly, he arranged for the Baptist Theological Union Seminary to relocate from Morgan Park and become the University of Chicago Divinity School.

In 1903 Harper founded the Religious Education Association.

== Other activities ==
While at University of Chicago, Harper chaired a mayoral commission responsible for reorganizing Chicago Public Schools and standardizing the system's curriculum. Harper, being opposed to the employment of women as teachers (which had resulted from the reforms of Horace Mann), moved to block a raise for female teachers and encourage the selective hiring of men. (When female teachers complained about this, Harper replied that they should be glad they earned as much as his wife's maid.) The ensuing dispute contributed to the organizing of the Chicago Teachers Federation, the precursor to the Chicago Teachers Union.

In 1896, Harper assisted Lydia Moss Bradley in founding Bradley Polytechnic Institute in Peoria, Illinois. Now known as Bradley University, Harper served as its first president.

== Death and legacy ==
Harper died on January 10, 1906, of cancer at age 49. He and his wife are interred at Rockefeller Memorial Chapel on campus at the University of Chicago.

William Rainey Harper College, a community college located in Palatine, Illinois, honors him. He is also the namesake of Harper High School and Harper Avenue in Chicago. An elementary school in Cleveland is named for him as well.

== Published works ==
- Hebrew Vocabularies List of the Most Frequently Occurring Hebrew Words (1882)
- Introductory Hebrew Method and Manual (1886)
- An Inductive Greek Method (1888) (co-written by William E. Waters)
- An Inductive Latin Method (co-written by Isaac Burgess)
- Elements of Hebrew Syntax By an Inductive Method (1888)
- An Introductory New Testament Greek Method (1889), (co-written by Revere Franklin Weidner)
- Eight Books Of Caesar's Gallic War, with Herbert Cushing Tolman (American Book Company, 1891)
- Young Folks Library: Leaders of Men or History Told in Biography (Editor-1891)
- The Foreshadowings of the Christ
- The Prophetic Element in the Old Testament
- The Priestly Element in the Old Testament
- An Inductive Greek Primer (1893) (co-written by Clarence Castle)
- Xenophon's Anabasis Seven Books (1893)
- Religion and the Higher Life (1904)
- The Prophetic Element In The Old Testament: An Aid To Historical Study For Use In Advanced Bible Classes (1905)
- A Critical and Exegetical Commentary on Amos and Hosea (1905)
- The Biblical world, Volume 53 (1919)
- Inductive Bible Studies; Samuel, Saul, David and Solomon

== See also ==
- Sherwood Eddy

== Notes ==
Academic offices
| Preceded by None | President of the University of Chicago; 1891–1906 | Succeeded by Harry Pratt Judson |
