= List of University of Chicago people =

This list of University of Chicago people provides links to list articles that include the faculty members, researchers, graduates, and other students of the University of Chicago. The alumni include graduates and attendees. Graduates are defined as those who hold bachelor's, master's, PhD, or equivalent degrees from the university, while attendees are those who studied at the university (excluding the summer term) but did not complete the program or obtain a degree. The faculty of the university include long-term faculty members and temporary academic staffs. The long-term faculty members consists of tenure/tenure-track and equivalent academic positions, while that of temporary academic staffs consists of lecturers (without tenure), postdoctoral researchers, visiting professors or scholars (visitors), and equivalent academic positions.

== List articles ==
- List of University of Chicago alumni
- List of University of Chicago faculty
- List of University of Chicago Law School alumni
- List of University of Chicago Booth School of Business alumni
- List of University of Chicago Booth School of Business faculty
- List of Nobel laureates affiliated with the University of Chicago
