= Today's New International Version =

Updated translation of the Bible

- Full name: Today's New International Version
- Abbreviation: TNIV
- NT published: 2002
- Complete Bible published: 2005
- Translation type: Dynamic equivalence
- Version revision: New International Version (NIV)
- Publisher: Zondervan (US), Hodder and Stoughton (EU)
- Copyright: Copyright 2005 Biblica (Formerly International Bible Society)
- Genesis 1:1–3 In the beginning God created the heavens and the earth. Now the earth was formless and empty, darkness was over the surface of the deep, and the Spirit of God was hovering over the waters. And God said, "Let there be light," and there was light. John 3:16 For God so loved the world that he gave his one and only Son, that whoever believes in him shall not perish but have eternal life.

Today's New International Version (TNIV) is an English translation of the Bible which was developed by the International Bible Society based on the previous New International Version (NIV) originally published in 1978. It is explicitly Protestant like its predecessor; the deuterocanonical books are not part of this translation. The TNIV New Testament was published in March 2002. The complete Bible was published in February 2005. The rights to the text are owned by Biblica (formerly the International Bible Society). Zondervan published the TNIV in North America. Hodder & Stoughton published the TNIV in Europe.

A team of 13 translators worked on the translation, with forty additional scholars reviewing the translation work. The team was designed to be cross-denominational.

In 2011, sales of both the 1984 edition of the NIV and the TNIV were discontinued, following the release of a revised and updated version of the NIV.

== Translation philosophy ==
The translation took more than a decade to complete; 13 evangelical scholars worked on the translation: Ronald F. Youngblood, Kenneth L. Barker, John H. Stek, Donald H. Madvig, R. T. France, Gordon Fee, Karen H. Jobes, Walter Liefeld, Douglas J. Moo, Bruce K. Waltke, Larry L. Walker, Herbert M. Wolf and Martin Selman. Forty other scholars, many of them experts on specific books of the Bible, reviewed the translation teams' work. They came from a range of Evangelical denominational backgrounds.

The intent of the TNIV translators was to produce an accurate and readable translation in contemporary English. The Committee on Bible Translation wanted to build a new version on the heritage of the NIV and, like its predecessor, create a balanced mediating version–one that would fall in-between the most literal translation and the most free; between word-for-word (Formal Equivalence) and thought-for-thought (Dynamic Equivalence).

For translation a wide range of manuscripts were reviewed. The Masoretic Text, the Dead Sea Scrolls, the Samaritan Pentateuch, the Greek Septuagint or (LXX), the Aquila, Symmachus and Theodotion, the Latin Vulgate, the Syriac Peshitta, the Aramaic Targums, and for the Psalms the Juxta Hebraica of Jerome were all consulted for the Old Testament. The Dead Sea Scrolls were occasionally followed where the Masoretic Text seemed inconsistent. The United Bible Societies Nestle-Aland Greek New Testament text was used for the New Testament.

== Differences ==
Approximately 7% of the text was changed from the most recent (1984) version of the NIV. According to Craig Blomberg the TNIV moves in a "more literal direction three times more often than not". Mark L. Strauss has stated that the majority of changes are "based on advances in biblical scholarship, linguistics, and archaeology".

In Matthew 1:18, where the NIV says that Mary was "with child", the TNIV simply says Mary was "pregnant".

In Luke 12:38, the phrase "second or third watch of the night" employed in the NIV is changed to "middle of the night or toward daybreak" in the TNIV.

The TNIV translators have, at times, opted for more traditional Anglo-Saxon or poetic renderings than those found in the NIV. For example, "the heavens" is sometimes chosen to replace "the sky", as is the case in Isaiah 50:3: "I clothe the heavens with darkness and make sackcloth its covering".

At times the TNIV offers a different or nuanced understanding of a passage. For example, in the NIV, Psalm 26:3 reads, "For your love is ever before me, / and I walk continually in your truth". The TNIV reads, "For I have always been mindful of your unfailing love / and have lived in reliance on your faithfulness". There are several changes in this one verse, but of special note is the TNIV's translation of the Hebrew word ’emet. The TNIV translators took this word to mean more than simple honesty in Psalm 26:3, referring more specifically to reliability or trustworthiness.

Examples of other changes are "truly I tell you" becomes "I tell you the truth;" "fellow workers" become "coworkers;" "the Jews", particularly in John's Gospel, often becomes "Jewish leaders" when the context makes the statement's real meaning apparent; and "miracles", especially in John, become the more literal "signs", "miraculous signs", or "works". The word for "Spirit", where there is a good chance it means the Holy Spirit, is now capitalized. "Peter" is now rendered "Cephas" when the Greek merely transliterates the Hebrew name.

Other notable changes are that "Christ" has regularly been rendered as "Messiah", and "saints" has often been replaced with terms such as "God's people" or "believers".

== Gender language and the TNIV ==
Among other differences from the NIV, the TNIV uses gender-neutral language to refer to people. Two examples of this kind of translation decision are found in Genesis and Matthew:

Genesis 1:27 reads, "So God created human beings in his own image." Older translations use the word "man" to translate the word אָדָם (’adam) employed in the Hebrew language, the same word used as the proper name of the first man married to the first woman, Eve.

Matthew 5:9 reads: "Blessed are the peacemakers, for they will be called children of God." Here, the Greek word huioi is translated "children" rather than "sons" as found in other modern English translations such as the Revised Standard Version, New American Standard Bible, New King James Version, and the Amplified Bible.

However, the 1611 Authorized King James Version also renders this passage as "children" rather than "sons." Masculine references to God, such as "Father" and "Son," are not modified from the literal translation in the TNIV.

Under 30% of the changes in the TNIV involve the use of inclusive language. The TNIV's approach to gender inclusive language is similar to the New International Version Inclusive Language Edition, New Revised Standard Version, the New Living Translation, the New Century Version, and the Contemporary English Version.

== The TNIV and οἱ Ἰουδαίοι (hoi ioudaioi) ==
In the TNIV some original Greek text references to οἱ Ἰουδαίοι (transliterated hoi ioudaioi), are changed from the original English translation of "the Jews" to "Jewish leaders" or simply "they" (such as in John 18:36). This change has been called for by Jewish leaders as a way of avoiding misunderstanding in the Gospel of John.

A number of evangelical scholars agree with this change. The TNIV is not alone among English Bible versions in following recent biblical scholarship on this matter.

== Circulation ==
- In 2002, Zondervan published the TNIV New Testament.
- In 2005, the TNIV New Testament Audio Bible was published by Hodder & Stoughton. It features an Anglicised Version of the Today's New International Version read by a cast including Tyler Butterworth, Susan Sheridan, Joan Walker, Daniel Philpott, and Anna Bentinck. Available in CD and MP3 format. A downloadable MP3 format can also be found at voxbiblia.com
- In 2005, Zondervan planned to advertise the TNIV in Rolling Stone as part of its campaign to launch the full TNIV Bible to "spiritually intrigued 18 to 34-year-olds." Just weeks before the ad's scheduled run date, Rolling Stone pulled the ad, citing a policy against religious advertisements in its magazine. Beginning with a story in USA Today, media frenzy ensued and two weeks later, Rolling Stone reversed its position and published the ad.
- In 2006, Zondervan launched the TNIV Study Bible with study notes and a 700-page topical index.
- In 2007, the International Bible Society released The Books of the Bible, which makes several changes in formatting the text. The TNIV text is used without chapter and verse divisions. Section headings are removed and footnotes are moved to the end of each book. The books are presented in an alternate order, and longer works that were divided over time are restored to their original unity. (For example, 1 and 2 Samuel and 1 and 2 Kings were originally a single book. They are recombined in The Books of the Bible as Samuel-Kings.)
- Also in 2007, a manga version of the TNIV was released. It was created by British/Nigerian artist Ajibayo Akinsiku who goes by the pseudonym Siku.
- In 2008, Zondervan released the TNIV Reference Bible. University teacher Rick Mansfield stated in an online review of a preview copy that it is "the edition of the TNIV I wish I had been using from the very beginning."
- With the 2011 release of an updated version of the NIV, both the TNIV and the 1984 NIV have been discontinued. Keith Danby, president, and chief executive officer of Biblica, said that they erred in presenting past updates — failing to convince people that revisions were needed and underestimating readers' loyalty to the 1984 NIV.

== Supporters ==
Denominations supportive of the TNIV include the Christian Reformed Church (CRC), which officially endorsed the TNIV as an acceptable translation for use, the Evangelical Covenant Church and the Free Methodist Church of North America. Scholars from the Free Methodist Church of North America had a varied response from it "constitutes no threat" to "most accurate ever."

Evangelical scholars and pastoral leaders supporting the project include Mark L. Strauss, Tremper Longman, John Ortberg, Adam Hamilton, Craig Blomberg, Darrell Bock, Don Carson, Peter Furler, Bill Hybels, Ben Witherington III, Lee Strobel, Philip Yancey, Dan Kimball, Terri Blackstock, Erwin McManus, Ted Haggard and others.

== Critics ==
In June 2002, over 100 evangelical leaders signed a 'Statement of Concern' opposing the TNIV. The Presbyterian Church in America and the Southern Baptist Convention passed resolutions opposing the TNIV and other inclusive-language translations.

Evangelical scholars and various public figures critical of inclusive-language translations include John F. MacArthur, J. I. Packer, Jack T. Chick, Gail Riplinger, James Dobson, Jerry Falwell, Texe Marrs, Wayne Grudem, Peter Ruckman, D. James Kennedy, Josh McDowell, R. Albert Mohler, Jr., John Piper, Pat Robertson, R.C. Sproul, and Joni Eareckson Tada.
