= King James Only Controversy =

King James Only Controversy may refer to:

- King James Only Controversy, a book by theologian James White about the controversy over the King-James-Only movement.
- The King-James-Only Movement, a controversy within English speaking Protestant evangelicalism between those who espouse only using the King James Version of the Bible, and those who allow the use of other modern translations of the Bible.
