= Theodore Letis =

Theodore Peter Letis (July 15, 1951 – June 24, 2005) was an American theologian and church historian. He was an advocate of the Textus Receptus (TR). Letis was Lutheran, and argued for "the superiority of the TR based on the authority of the institutional church," a different approach to that of fundamentalists in the King James Only movement.

Letis studied at Evangel College, Westminster Theological Seminary, St. Charles Borromeo Seminary, Concordia Theological Seminary, Emory University, and the University of Edinburgh. He directed the Institute for Renaissance and Reformation Biblical Studies and wrote The Ecclesiastical Text: Text Criticism, Biblical Authority and the Popular Mind and Today's Christian & the Church's Bible: A Time to Return to the Authorized Version.

Letis was the "first scholar to set out in detail" B. B. Warfield's "indebtedness to critical methodology for the defense of the faith." He argued that Warfield "broke with the prior Princeton position on the emerging science of textual criticism by his endorsement of conjectural emendation.
