= Byzantine priority theory =

Christian textual criticism theory

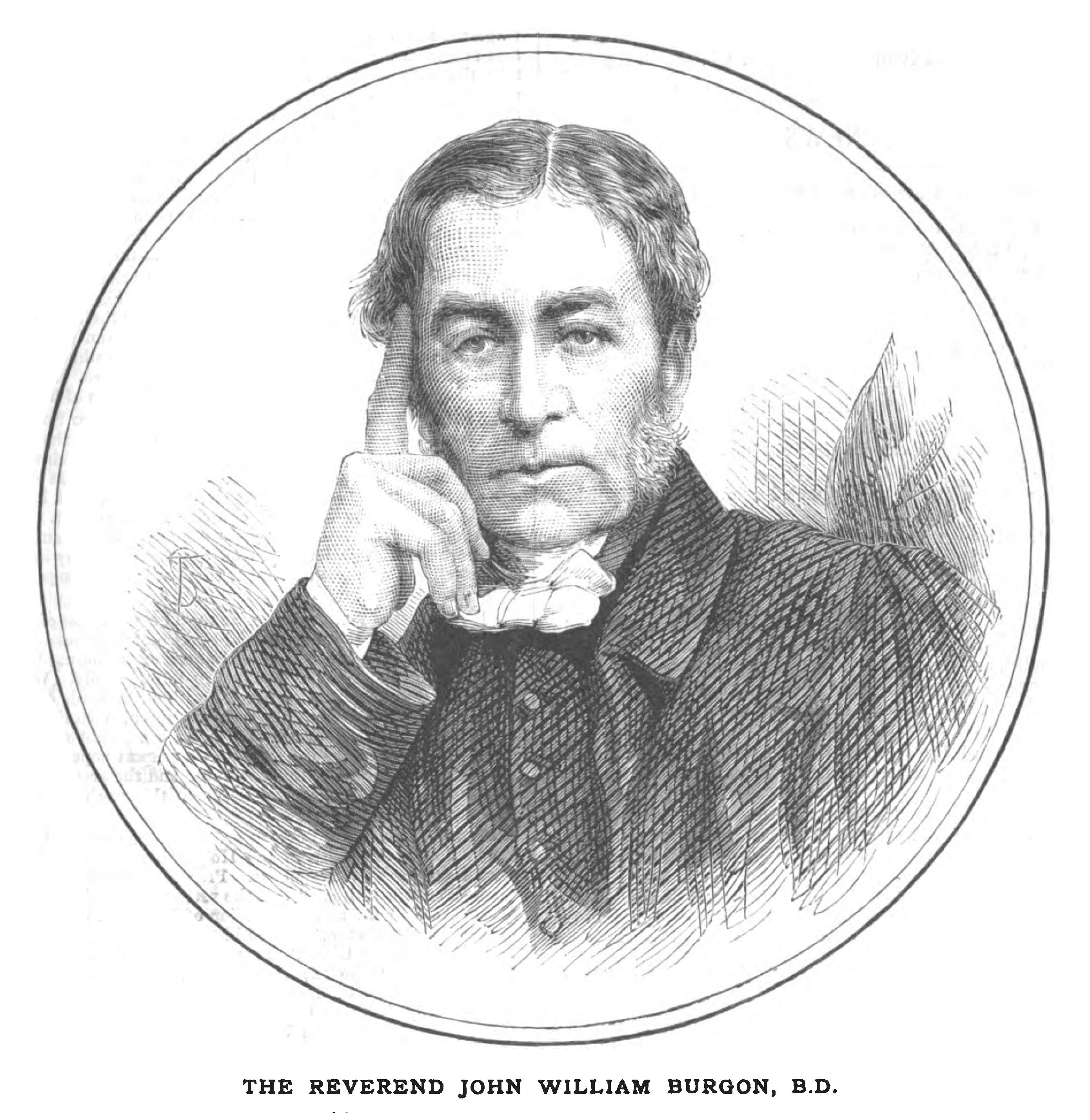
John William Burgon was a famous advocate of the Byzantine priority theory.

The Byzantine priority theory is a theory within Christian textual criticism held by a minority of textual critics. This view sees the Byzantine textform as the New Testament's most accurate textual tradition, instead of the theorized Alexandrian or Western text types, as well as, the Majority Text and Family 35 positions. The pioneers of this view are Maurice A. Robinson and the late William G. Pierpont, Where there are variant readings in different manuscripts, the most credible common Byzantine reading should be preferred, either strictly or as a rule-of-thumb.

It does not spring from the Majority Text methodology that takes the numerically most common readings from all New Testament manuscripts: most manuscripts are Byzantine texts therefore the Majority Text is Byzantine. Nor is it the same as the Eastern Orthodox Patriarchal Text (lectionary tradition), or the view of those who advocate the Textus Receptus (TR) like John Burgon, Salomon, E Hills and Theodore Letis. Other TR advocates hold a confessional position instead of adhering to a method of criticism. Given the TR's origin is in the Reformation so it must be good in their thinking. Although the Byzantine textform, Family 35, Majority Text, Patriarchal Text, and TR are sourced in Byzantine manuscripts, there are some differences between them due to different philosophies.

== History ==
The TR position began to be defended in response to B. F. Wescott's and F. J. A Hort's promotion of Alexandrian readings in producing the Revised Version. That was soon followed by their The New Testament in the Original Greek being published. The chief of the early advocates of this view was John Burgon. The Patriarchal Text was compiled from lectionary texts at the beginning 20th century for use in the Orthodox churches. The Majority Text was produced by Zane Hodges, Arthur Farstad and others like Wilbur Pickering who went on to collate and produce the Family 35 text. The Byzantine priority theory has been advocated more recently by modern textual critics such as the late William G. Pierpont and Maurice Robinson. Harry A. Sturz was not an advocate of these Byzantine positions but wrote a book demonstrating Byzantine readings in the early manuscripts. Critics of the Byzantine textform argue that such does not prove an early Byzantine text but modern text critics have all but abandoned all text-types other than the Byzantine. That does not mean they have a Byzantine preface in any way, it just means that the Byzantine textform is the only textform since there is no coherence in any other posited group to qualify as a textform including the early manuscripts. If there are no early text-types, then there is no alternative to the Byzantine! If there are no other text-types, then to argue Sturz' work does not prove a text-type has little to no significance. While the Byzantine textform has recently garnered more respect than ever, it remains a minority position among textual critics.

In the modern day, multiple editions of the Greek Majority text have been created, such as the editions of Maurice A. Robinson & William G. Pierpont, Byzantine Majority Text (Family 35) by Wilbur Pickering, The Greek New Testament According to the Majority Text (Hodges-Farstad) and the Eastern Orthodox Patriarchal text.

== Theory ==
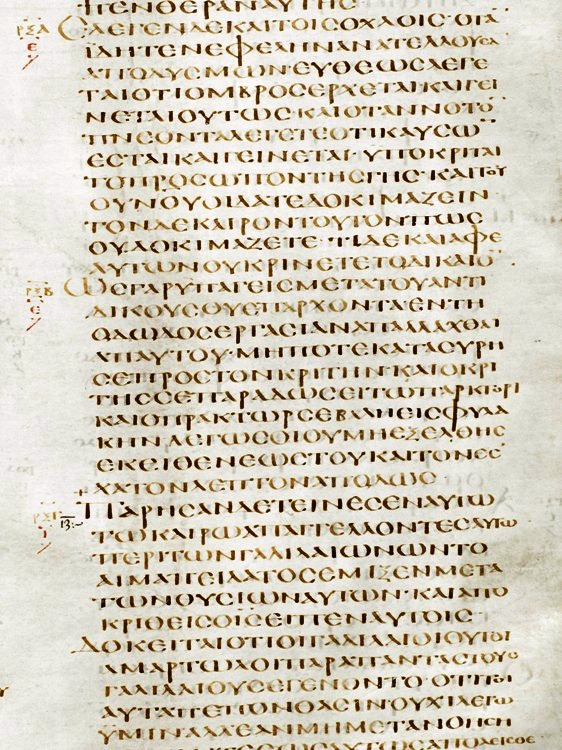
Codex Alexandrinus, dated to around A.D. 400 to 440, the oldest Greek witness of the Byzantine text in the Gospels.

=== Methods ===
Advocates of the Byzantine priority theory may give more weight to the number of manuscripts than the advocates of the Critical Text; however, number is not seen as either the main or the sole criterion for determining readings. According to Maurice Robinson, the Byzantine priority theory is primarily a transmissionally-based theory, and internal evidences are only to be applied after an evaluation of the external data has been made. Although Byzantine prioritists place more weight on the most common readings found, its advocates do not entirely focus on the raw number of manuscripts: instead, the value of manuscripts is according to factors such as the age of the manuscript and the particular scribal habits of the copyists. Scribal habits are considerably absent as a consideration in the production of eclectic texts and much has been assumed with no evidence. The canons of textual criticism are being abandoned in light of the research done on scribal habits.

Byzantine prioritists do not reject the use of internal evidence when there are split readings. Revelation is particularly problematic. However, it is to be viewed alongside transmissional probabilities, and final judgements on readings require the application of internal evidence after the evaluation of external data.

=== Early Usage of the Byzantine text ===
Critics of the Byzantine priority theory have generally argued that earlier, and thus "better," Alexandrian readings are to be preferred, arguing that the Byzantine text-type is a much later text, since the earliest Greek manuscript of the Byzantine text dates to the very early 5th century. Byzantine priorists, on the other hand, have attempted to establish the originality of the Byzantine text-type.

According to the theory of Robinson, during the early Christian period, some regions saw the rise of uncontrolled and popular manuscript copies, complicated by attempts to correct them by scribes and persecution against Christianity, which cut off some correcting factors. This led to the emergence of multiple local texts, influenced by copying processes and environmental factors. However, with the sanctioning of churches under Constantine, wider communication made cross-correction easier and caused the eventual emergence of a universally-shared text. This text, resembling the original autograph form, gradually became the dominant New Testament text, explaining the prevalence of the Byzantine Text-type. According to Robinson, scribal "creativity" did not form any part in this "autograph restoration", but instead readings made by individual scribes would be weeded out by the next copying generation by cross-correction, causing an improved and preserved text found in an increasing number of manuscripts, overcoming the influence of the multiple local texts created by an uncontrollable process. He also argues that the mere age of a manuscript should not be the determining factor of importance, arguing that many early manuscripts we have today were influenced by the uncontrolled textual transmission in their local regions. Secondly, Robinson states that even a later manuscript may have been copied from a very early manuscript which eclectic critics agree.

Additionally, there have been many attempts to demonstrate from historical data the early existence of distinct Byzantine variants. One of these attempts was made by John Burgon, who tried to demonstrate that the Byzantine text is the most ancient form of the New Testament text by placing emphasis on patristic quotations of the New Testament, which he claimed to agree generally with the Byzantine text. However his conclusions are highly controversial among scholars and have been subject to criticism. The complaint is that we need modern critical texts of the church fathers but that has not impacted the latest critical texts much if at all which leaves Burgon's massive collation of NT quotes by the fathers as a substantial body of evidence that has not been overturned. The Individual readings in agreement with the later Byzantine text have also been found in the very early papyri, such as 𝔓^{46} and 𝔓^{45}. Harry Sturz has concluded from this that the Byzantine text-type must have had an early existence. Although critics such as Zuntz have argued that despite some Byzantine readings possibly being ancient, the Byzantine tradition as a whole originates from a later period. But that stands without an alternative. Studies (Gospels and Galatians) examining Codex Vaticanus with Codex Sinaiticus where they disagree find that one sides with the Byzantine against the other virtually every time.

=== Theological arguments ===
Byzantine priorists often do allow for the usage of theological arguments; however, they are viewed as secondary to textual evidence. This is in contrast to those who advocate the King James Only or the Textus Receptus Only theories, whose argumentative basis is primarily theological and confessional.

=== Pericope Adulterae ===
The Pericope Adulterae (John 7:53–8:11) is a major variant defended as authentic by those who affirm the Byzantine priority theory. They suggest there are points of similarity between the pericope's style and the style of the rest of the gospel and claim that the details of the encounter fit very well into the context of the surrounding verses. According to Zane Hodges, the pericope's appearance in the majority of manuscripts, if not in the oldest ones, is evidence of its authenticity. Maurice Robinson argues that the anomalies in the transmission and usage of the Pericope Adulterae may be explained by the Lectionary system, where, due to the skipping of Pericope Adulterae during the Pentecost lesson, some scribes would relocate the story so as not to intervene with the flow of the Pentecost lesson; he also states that the same reason may have caused some Church Fathers such as John Chrysostom to leave it without mention in their writings. He argues that mistakes arising from the Lectionary system are also able to explain the omission of the story in some manuscripts.

== Criticism ==
The Majority Text theory has been criticized by major textual critics such as Bart D. Ehrman and Daniel B. Wallace. But this does not apply to Byzantine priority. According to Ehrman, the majority text did not become a majority until the 9th century. But Robinson and Pickering rebut with arguments putting the Byzantine going back to the 4th and 3rd centuries. this is not an argument against Byzantine priority!

The Byzantine priority theory has been also critiqued by advocates of the primacy of the Textus Receptus. Such critiques generally focus on the rejection of the strong doctrine of the providential preservation of the scripture by Byzantine priorists, who instead follow a textual-critical method. The Trinitarian Bible Society which advocates for the Textus Receptus has argued that the textual-critical methods behind the texts of Hodges and Robinson are contrary to God's preservation of scripture and do not provide epistemological certainty of the word of God. But how serious is that given there is only 2 or 3 percent difference between the Byzantine and TR? That percent pales in light of the doctrinal differences in the TR camp.

== Influence ==
Some translations have been created based on the editions of the Byzantine text, including the World English Bible based on the text of Robinson & William G. Pierpont, the Majority Standard Bible and the Sovereign Creator Has Spoken version based on Wilbur Pickering's edition of family 35. Additionally, an interlinear translation of the Hodges-Farstad text has been made by Thomas Nelson.

The Holman Christian Standard Bible was initially planned to become an English translation of the Byzantine majority text, although because Arthur Farstad died just few months into the project, it shifted to the Critical Text. However, the HCSB bible was still made to contain the Byzantine majority readings within its footnotes. Similarly, the New King James Version contains the Byzantine majority readings within the footnotes, although it is a translation of the Textus Receptus.
