= Abide Weekend =

- Founded: 2013
- Founder: Dave Pickett
- Location: (United Kingdom) Canterbury, Kent
- Region served: United Kingdom
- Volunteers: 50
- Website: www.abideweekend.co.uk

Abide Weekend is an annual Christian youth conference based in Canterbury, Kent. It is hosted by a collaboration of three Christian charities: Scripture Union, Urban Saints (formerly 'Crusaders') and Change Youth.

== History ==
In 2013 Dave Pickett, then director of Kent-based charity 'Change Youth', began a new venture to bring youth groups from across the South East of England together for Christian teaching and worship. Once a core team had been formed, Abide Weekend swiftly gained the backing of two large Christian charities based in the United Kingdom - Scripture Union and Urban Saints. The first Abide Weekend conference took place in the Summer of 2014 under the leadership of Dave Pickett. The conference was the inspiration of Dave Pickett and his right-hand man, Adam Gauton, who had volunteered for youth work alongside Dave for over three years.

Over 200 young people, leaders and volunteers attended the first Abide Weekend conference which took place in a Scout campsite near Canterbury - Ross Wood Campsite. The ambitious organisation have set high targets for 2015, as they aim to double their attendance in the event's second year.

Dave Pickett
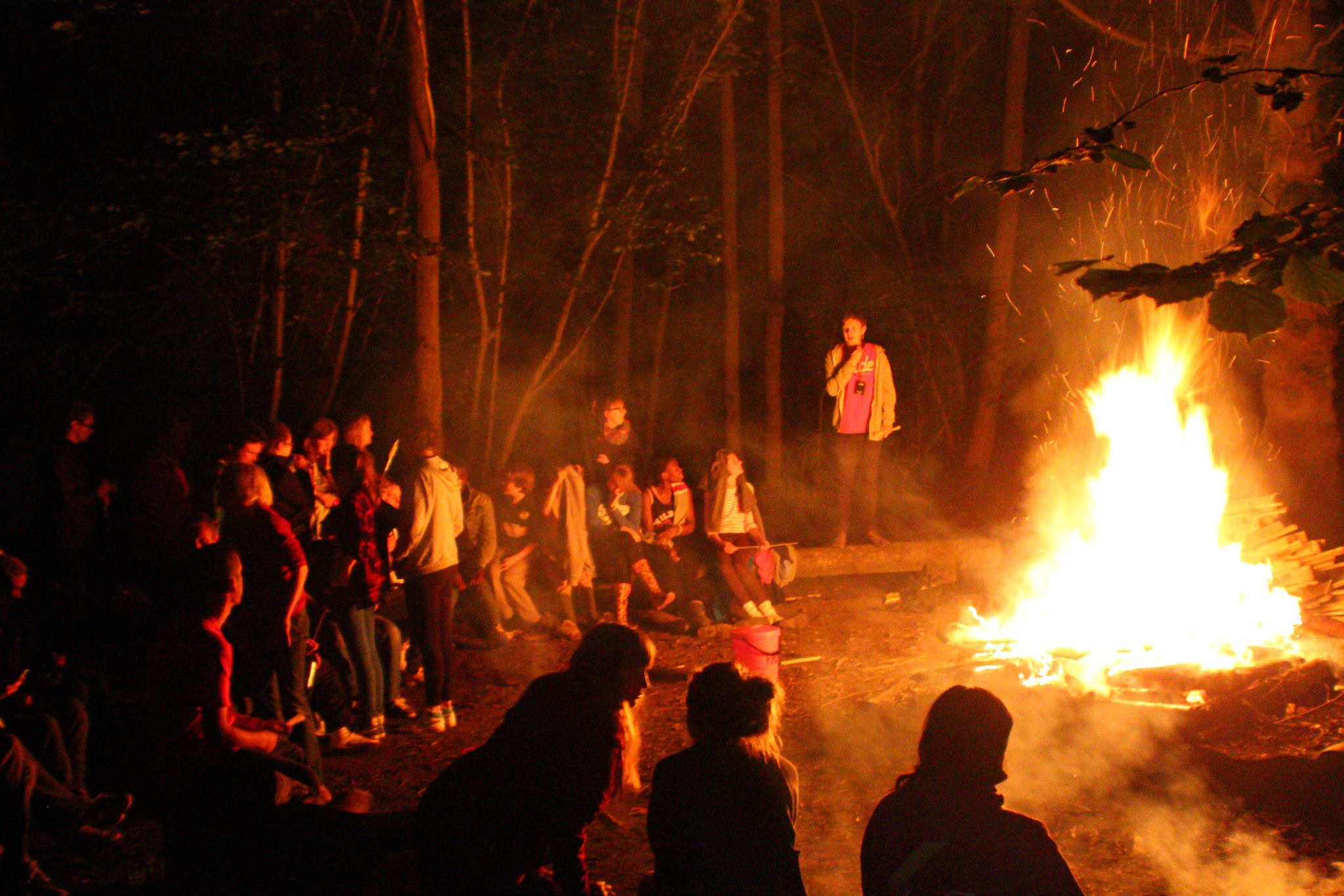
- Dave Pickett speaking at an Abide Weekend campfire
- Location: Ross Wood Campsite
- Website: http://www.abideweekend.co.uk/

== Abide 2014 ==
The first year of Abide Weekend saw worship led by London-based worship band Worship Central alongside worship leader Tom Read (formerly of The Vine Band). Speakers included Jonny Hughes, the student worker of Holy Trinity Brompton church in South Kensington (and cousin of worship leader Tim Hughes), as well as Steve Morris, youth pastor at Chafford Hundred Community Church, and Phil Hulks, the Cluster Development Director for Urban Saints. The weekend was designed to focus on three main themes: Worship, Leadership and Discipleship. Seminars were based around these three themes and Main Meetings were designed to bring these themes together.

== See also ==
- Urban Saints
- Scripture Union
- Soul Survivor (charity)
- Hillsong Church London
- Tim Hughes - see Worship Central
