= Wiseman hypothesis =

Theory of Genesis authorship

The Wiseman hypothesis, sometimes called the tablet theory, is a theory of the authorship and composition of the Book of Genesis which suggests that Moses compiled Genesis from tablets handed down through Abraham and the other patriarchs. Originally advocated by P. J. Wiseman (1888–1948) in his New discoveries in Babylonia about Genesis (1936). The book was republished by Wiseman's son, Donald Wiseman, as Ancient records and the structure of Genesis: A case for literary unity in 1985. The hypothesis received some support from R. K. Harrison (1969) but otherwise remained without acceptance in scholarly circles.

== History ==
=== P. J. Wiseman ===
Air Commodore P. J. Wiseman, a British officer who visited many active archaeological sites during his career in the Middle East, found that ancient narrative tablets usually ended in colophons which had a very specific format consisting of three parts: 1) "this has been the history/book/genealogy of..."; 2) the name of the person who wrote or owned the tablet; and 3) a date (such as "in the year of the great earthquake" or "the 3rd year of king so-and-so", etc.). Wiseman noted that there are 11 phrases in Genesis which have the same colophon format, which have long been identified as the toledoth (Hebrew for "generations") passages; the Book is generally divided thematically along the lines of the toledoth. What Wiseman brought new to the table was the idea that these apparent colophons indicated that Genesis had originally been a collection of narrative clay tablets written in cuneiform, like the ancient tablets he had seen, which Moses had edited into a single document on parchment or papyrus. This is in contrast with traditional views that Moses wrote Genesis entirely on his own without any outside sources and with the Documentary hypothesis that Genesis was compiled by much later and unknown redactors.

Once a link had been made between the tolodoth in Genesis and the ancient colophons, another point became apparent. Just as the colophons came at the end of the narratives, so too, the tolodoths may come at the end of narratives. Thus the first of these toledoth passages, Genesis 2:4, refers to the preceding Creation account beginning in Genesis 1, rather than being the introduction to the succeeding account. The traditional understanding has been that since nearly all the tolodoths are immediately followed by a list of descendants of the person named in the tolodoth, then the tolodoths were thought to be the beginning of sections in Genesis.

In his Creation Revealed in Six Days, P. J. Wiseman argued that the days of creation represented the time period in which God took to reveal his work of creation, and that Genesis 1 "is an account of what 'God said' about the things 'God made'... it is His revelation to men about His creative acts in time past."

=== R. K. Harrison ===
R. K. Harrison in his Introduction to the Old Testament wrote approvingly of [Wiseman's] approach which "had the distinct advantage of relating the ancient Mesopotamian sources underlying Genesis to an authentic Mesopotamian life-situation, unlike the attempts of the Graf–Wellhausen school, and showed that the methods of writing and compilation employed in Genesis were in essential harmony with the processes current among the scribes of ancient Babylonia."

Harrison noted that these examples had been discounted by scholars who follow Wellhausen and the Documentary hypothesis, since the central basis of the Documentary hypothesis is that the Pentateuch is mostly a work composed by unknown editors and authors who lived much later than the time of Moses.

=== Donald Wiseman ===
Donald Wiseman noted in the foreword to the revised edition of his father's book that since it had first been written (1936) many more colophons have been discovered among Babylonian cuneiform texts which substantiated the use of this scribal device. Texts from Syria and Mesopotamia show continuity in tradition of scribal education and literary practices for more than two millennia, giving fixed and dated points. He particularly valued the implication of this theory for the early use of writing. Genesis 1-37 could be a transcript of the oldest written records.

== Tablets in Genesis ==
This is a breakdown of Genesis into 'tablets' delineated by colophons according to Wiseman's theory.

Tablet	Genealogy	Narrative	Colophon
1	Creation of Universe 1:1	1:2 to 2:3	"This is the account of the heavens and of the earth when they were created." 2:4
2	Heavens and Earth 2:4	2:5 to 4:26	"This is the written account of Adam." 5:1
3	Adam to Noah 5:1–32	6:1–8	"This is the account of Noah." 6:9
4	Noah to Shem, Ham, and Japeth 6:9–10	6:11 to 9:29	"This is the account of Shem, Ham, and Japheth, Noah's sons." 10:1
5	Descendants of Shem, Ham, and Japeth 10:1–32	11:1–9	"This is the account of Shem." 11:10
6	Shem to Terah 11:10–26	no narrative	"This is the account of Terah." 11:27
7	Terah to Abraham 11:27	11:28 to 25:11	"This is the account of Abraham's son Ishmael." 25:12 (eldest son)
8	Descendants of Ishmael 25:13–18	no narrative	"This is the account of Abraham's son Isaac." 25:19
9	Abraham to Isaac 25:19	25:20 to 35:29	"This is the account of Esau." 36:1 (eldest son)
10	Descendants of Esau 36:2–5	36:6–8	"This is the account of Esau." 36:9
11	Descendants of Esau 36:10 to 37:1	no narrative	"This is the account of Jacob." 37:2
	no genealogy	37:2 to 50:26	no colophon
The statements immediately following each colophon would be the beginning of the next tablet; for example, Genesis 2:4 reads "When the LORD God made the earth and the heavens…" beginning Adam's story.

== Reception ==
Biblical scholar Victor Hamilton states that Wiseman's hypothesis was "the first concerted attempt to challenge the hypothesis" of introductory colophons. Hamilton does however identify several problems with what he terms the "Wiseman-Harrison approach". Firstly, "in five instances where the formula precedes a genealogy ..., it is difficult not to include the colophon with what follows." Secondly, the approach requires the "unlikely" explanation that "Ishmael was responsible for preserving the history of Abraham", Isaac for Ishmael's history, Esau for Jacob's and Jacob for Esau's. The third problem he identifies is that Genesis is narrative, not biographical, as that approach would suggest.

Herbert M. Wolf describes the theory as "an attractive one", but suggests that it has "serious shortcomings". Firstly, he suggests that toledoth almost always fit more naturally with the verses that they precede than with the verses that precede them. Secondly he doubts if Moses would be able to read writing made before the Tower of Babel. Thirdly he also suggests that the pairings of preservers and preserved histories are "unlikely", given the "rivalry and jealousy" involved and the lack of contact between Esau and Jacob. The Bible Knowledge Commentary: Old Testament says that Wiseman's view is "unconvincing" and distinguishes between the Babylonian colophons and the toledoth of Genesis, in that the colophon is a repetition, not a description of contents, the owner named is the current owner, not the original, and the colophons do not use the Akkadian equivalent of the toledoth as part of their formula.

== Books ==
- Wiseman, P. J. (1936). New Discoveries in Babylonia about Genesis. London: Marsh, Morgan and Scott.
- Wiseman, P.J. (1985). Wiseman, D.J. (ed.). Ancient Records and the Structure of Genesis: A Case for Literary Unity. Nashville: Thomas Nelson, Inc. ISBN 978-0-8407-7502-3.

== See also ==
- Mosaic authorship
- Documentary hypothesis
- Lower criticism
- Biblical criticism
- Dating the Bible
