= Donald Wiseman =

English scholar (1918–2010)

Donald John Wiseman
- Born: 25 October 1918; Walderton, Hampshire, England
- Died: 2 February 2010 (aged 91)
- Occupations: Professor, archaeologist, writer
- Spouse: Mary Catherine Ruoff
- Children: 3 daughters

Donald John Wiseman OBE FBA FSA (25 October 1918 – 2 February 2010) was a biblical scholar, archaeologist and Assyriologist. He was Professor of Assyriology at the University of London from 1961 to 1982.

== Early life and beliefs ==
Wiseman was born in Walderton, a hamlet just northeast of Emsworth, Hampshire in 1918. His father, Air Commodore P. J. Wiseman had travelled in the Middle East with the RAF and that had led to him writing a number of books on archaeology and the Bible. P. J. Wiseman formulated what is known as the Wiseman hypothesis, which suggests that many passages used by Moses or other authors to compose the Book of Genesis originated as histories and genealogies recorded in Mesopotamian cuneiform script on baked clay tablets, handed down through Abraham to later Hebrews. His mother Gertrude May, née Savage (1888–1971), was the daughter of a naval officer. Donald was the third of five children. The Wiseman family belonged to the Plymouth Brethren.

Wiseman came under the influence of the Crusaders, an evangelical Christian youth organisation, and professed faith at the age of nine, being baptised by full immersion in 1932. He taught himself the Hebrew alphabet from the section headings of Psalm 119. Martin Selman has pointed out that Wiseman was "first and foremost an evangelical Christian" and that his vision was "based on a deep Christian conviction about the Bible's reliability and relevance."

Selman suggests that Wiseman's "basic thesis" regarding the Old Testament was that "the Bible makes most sense when it is interpreted in the light of its own Near Eastern cultural context."

== War record ==
Wiseman served in the RAF in World War II. Initially serving as personal assistant to Air Vice-Marshal Keith Park during the Battle of Britain, he later transferred to military intelligence and in 1942 he became senior intelligence officer of the Mediterranean Allied Tactical Air Forces and accompanied the First Army in the race for Tunis, providing General Alexander with daily briefings on German military planning. He finished the war as group captain, was twice mentioned in despatches and received an OBE and a Bronze Star. His citation recorded that "the intelligence material gathered through his selfless and earnest work" had enabled the Allied commanders to plan and launch the air operations which brought victory to the Allied armies in Italy.

== Studies ==
Wiseman studied at Dulwich College and King's College London, where he won the McCaul Hebrew prize. After World War II, he read Oriental Languages at Wadham College, Oxford, studying Hebrew under Godfrey Driver and Akkadian under Oliver Gurney and obtaining a Master of Arts degree. He joined the Oxford Inter-Collegiate Christian Union and became its president in 1947. He married Mary Ruoff in 1948, and they had three children.

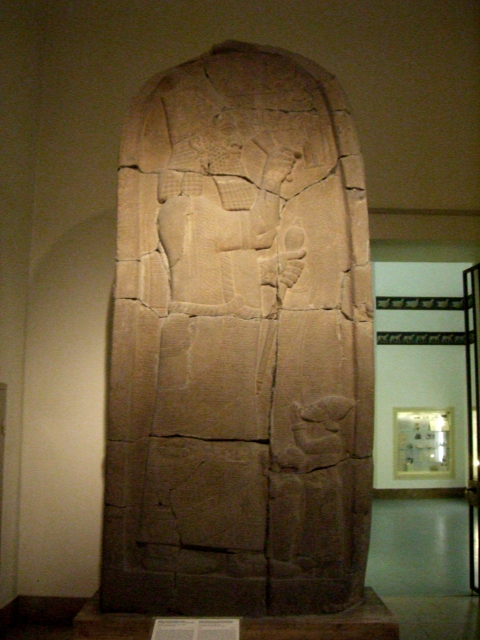
A victory stele of Esarhaddon, whose treaties Wiseman studied and published

== Archaeological work ==
Wiseman worked for four years at the British Museum deciphering cuneiform tablets excavated by Leonard Woolley at Alalakh in Syria. He also made several trips to Nimrud in modern-day Iraq, compiling a catalogue of the cuneiform tablets unearthed there.

Wiseman served at different times as director, chairman, president of the British School of Archaeology in Iraq, and editor of the school's journal, Iraq. He was also a trustee of the British School of Archaeology in Jerusalem, and a founding member of the British Institute in Amman for Archaeology and History.

== Academic contributions ==
=== Ancient Near Eastern treaties ===
Wiseman published a suzerainty treaty that Esarhaddon had made with his vassals, and recognised the connection between this political treaty and biblical covenants. In 1948, he presented a paper to the Society of Old Testament Study on the relationship between Old Testament treaties and those of the Assyrians and Hittites. Selman suggests that Wiseman anticipated "by some years an influential article by George Mendenhall, who is usually credited with establishing such a connection."

=== Abraham ===
Wiseman suggested that Abraham be viewed as a prince or governor, rather than as a seminomad. Selman suggests that this perspective indicates "Wiseman's ability to approach a long-standing problem in a creative manner."

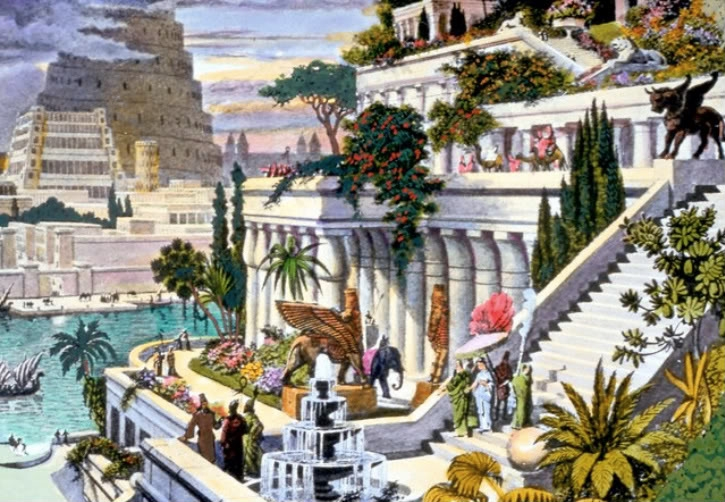
The Hanging Gardens of Babylon, by Marten Jacobszoon Heemskerk van Veen. Wiseman questioned the location of the Hanging Gardens.

=== Nebuchadnezzar ===
From his work on Babylonian texts, Wiseman established the date of Nebuchadnezzar's second capture of Jerusalem as 15/16 March 597 BC.

=== Hanging Gardens of Babylon ===
Wiseman questioned the traditional location of the Hanging Gardens of Babylon, suggesting that the site lay further west, by the river Euphrates, where the foundations of a massive tower had been discovered.

=== Identity of Darius the Mede ===
In 1957, Wiseman proposed the identification of Darius the Mede in the Book of Daniel with Cyrus the Great. Daniel 6:28 says "So this Daniel prospered during the reign of Darius and the reign of Cyrus the Persian" (NIV). This could also be translated, "So Daniel prospered during the reign of Darius, that is, the reign of Cyrus the Persian." Brian Coless suggests that in doing this Wiseman "cut the Gordian knot" of "the intractable problem of identifying King Darius the Mede."

== Organisational involvement ==
Wiseman was Professor of Assyriology at the University of London from 1961 to 1982. On his retirement, he was made an honorary member of the School of Oriental and African Studies and elected a fellow of King's College London. He served as chairman of Tyndale House from 1957 to 1986 and president of the Society for Old Testament Studies. He had a variety of roles with the Universities and Colleges Christian Fellowship, including two terms as president, in 1965–66 and 1973–74. He was chairman of the Scripture Gift Mission from 1978 to 1992, and served for a time on the New International Version Committee on Bible Translation.

Wiseman also maintained a close connection with the Crusaders organisation. He was leader of the class at Finchley, which included Cliff Richard. Richard has publicly spoken about the "significant role played by Crusader leaders in his early Christian journey."

== Recognition ==
Wiseman was elected a fellow of the British Academy in 1969 and served as vice-president in 1982 under Sir Isaiah Berlin. In 1983, he gave the Academy's Schweich Lecture on Biblical Archaeology, on the subject "Nebuchadrezzar and Babylon".

In 1993, a Festschrift was compiled in Wiseman's honour, and presented to him on the occasion of his 75th birthday. Contributors included Kenneth Kitchen, Alan Millard and Gordon Wenham.

== Writings ==
Wiseman wrote a commentary on the 1 and 2 Kings (ISBN 0830842098), and served as general editor of IVP's Tyndale Old Testament Commentary series. He was one of the editors of the New Bible Commentary and the New Bible Dictionary. Selman notes that he wrote 152 articles in this latter work, since there were so few "evangelicals in the United Kingdom at that time qualified to write such material".

== Personal life ==
On 18 September 1948 Donald John Wiseman married Mary Catherine Ruoff (1921–2006), a health visitor, and daughter of his father's friend Percy Otto Ruoff, bank official. They had three daughters, Gillian, Mary, and Catherine Jane.

== Publications ==
A full bibliography of Wiseman's work, compiled by Rob Bradshaw, is available here.

- The Alalakh Tablets, Occasional Papers, No.2 (London: British School of Archaeology at Ankara, 1953)
- Chronicles of the Chaldean Kings (626–556 BC) in the British Museum (1956)
- Ancient Records and the Structure of Genesis: A Case for Literary Unity (1985), a republished work of P. J. Wiseman, New Discoveries in Babylonia about Genesis (1936)
- The Vassal Treaties of Esarhaddon (1958)
- Illustrations from Biblical Archaeology (1958)
- Archaeological Confirmation of the Old Testament (1958)
- Peoples of Old Testament Times (1973)
- Nebuchadrezzar and Babylon (1985)
- 1 and 2 Kings Tyndale Old Testament Commentaries (1993)
- Life Above and Below (2003)
- A Habit of Dying (UK ed.). Troubador. 9 December 2010. ISBN 978-1848765436.
