= Donald H. Madvig =

Donald Harold Madvig (born 1929) is a retired American minister, biblical scholar and professor.

== Life ==
Madvig earned his BA and BDiv from Bethel College and Seminary, his ThM in New Testament from Fuller Theological Seminary (1960), and his MA and PhD (1966) in Mediterranean studies from Brandeis University.

Madvig joined the faculty at North American Baptist Seminary in 1963 as professor of Old Testament. He later served as professor of biblical literature at North Park Theological Seminary (1970–1974) and Bethel Theological Seminary.

Madvig has served as senior pastor for Beverly Evangelical Covenant Church in Chicago, senior pastor for Ravenswood Evangelical Covenant Church in Chicago, and interim pastor for Faith Baptist Church in Peshtigo, Wisconsin (1994–1995).

Madvig was vice chair of the Committee on Bible Translation and remains an honorary member, having done editorial work on both the New International Version and Today's New International Version of the Bible.

== Selected publications ==
- "A textual comparison of Habakkuk: a comparison of the text as found in the Masoretic text, the Septuagint, and the Habakkuk commentary of the Dead Sea scrolls" (1960)
- "A grammar of the Royal Assyrian annals of the Sargonid Dynasty" (1966)
- Book of Joshua in the Expositor's Bible Commentary (1992) ISBN 0-310-60893-7
