= Gail Riplinger =

American writer and speaker (born 1947)

Gail Anne Riplinger
- Born: Gail Anne Ludwig; October 10, 1947 (age 78); U.S.
- Occupations: Writer; lecturer
- Spouse(s): Terry Latessa (June 9, 1969 - February 12, 1975, div.); Franklin (Frank) Kaleda (November 1976 - August 6, 1984, div.); Michael (1984-current)
- Children: 1
- Writing career
- Notable works: New Age Bible Versions; The Language of the King James Bible

Gail Anne Riplinger (born October 10, 1947) is an American writer and speaker known for her advocacy of the King James Only movement and denunciation of modern English Bible translations.

== Bible comparisons ==
While an architecture professor at Kent State University, Gail Riplinger was questioned by a student regarding the text of Isaiah 14:12, which the King James Version rendered "Lucifer, son of the morning" and the New American Standard Version translated as "morning star", a phrase also used in the New Testament referring to Christ. This led Riplinger to spend six years collating contrasts and comparisons of translation differences between the King James and newer translations.

In 1993, Riplinger published her results in the book New Age Bible Versions, as a critique of newer translations, which she says "give a picture of the widening apostasy". In the book, Riplinger claims to have uncovered an alliance between the "chief conspirators in the New Age movement" and the newer versions of the bible, such as NIV, NASB, and NKJV. In October of that year, Texe Marrs recommended the book in his Flashpoint newsletter. It has since become one of the more influential books in the King James Only movement.

Riplinger followed this with The Language of the King James Bible, Which Bible is God's Word, In Awe of Thy Word, The Hidden History of the English Scriptures, Blind Guides, and Hazardous Materials: Greek and Hebrew Study Dangers.

She has spoken out against the people behind the modern versions of the Bible. She supports the manuscripts used in producing the King James Bible, and criticises the "Alexandrian Texts" manuscripts which are the root texts for most other modern Bibles. Riplinger's approach is to suggest that the textual differences between the KJV and modern translations is the result of heresies, secularism, and the New Age movement. Her objections are not to all textual differences, but rather those she believes have altered the meaning, which she associates with a satanic agenda.

In the January/February 1994 edition of The End Times and Victorious Living newsletter, Riplinger stated her reason for using G. A. Riplinger as the author name: "Each discovery was not the result of effort on my part, but of the direct hand of God — so much so that I hesitated to even put my name on the book. Consequently, I used G. A. Riplinger, which signifies to me, God and Riplinger — God as author and Riplinger as secretary." David Cloud, a proponent of the KJV only viewpoint, calls this statement "amazing and frightful", and says that "even the most radical charismatic prophets hesitate to use such intemperate language".

== Criticism ==
Recognized biblical scholars reject Riplinger’s position as being totally without foundation. A lengthy critical review of her book New Age Bible Versions authored by Bob and Gretchen Passantino of Answers In Action and published in Cornerstone in 1994, described the book as "erroneous, sensationalistic, misrepresentative, inaccurate, and logically indefensible". They concluded by summarizing "There is hardly a page of this book that is free from error. Riplinger does not know Greek, Hebrew, textual criticism, linguistics, principles of translation, logical argumentation, proper citation and documentation standards, competent English grammar and style, or even consistent spelling."

Critics say that Riplinger has misquoted and misused the works of others. Calling New Age Bible Versions a "curiosity", British theologian Graham Neville identifies specific shortcomings in Riplinger's approach. He says that the claim of a conspiracy to subvert the pure gospel is only interesting outside of fundamentalist circles in that her criticisms of modern translations depend on the false method of treating short excerpts in isolation, without regard to the general theological position of the translators she is criticizing. In his book The King James Only Controversy, James White points out that Riplinger uses "cut and paste" quotations out of context, misrepresenting what modern scholars have said, although he notes that it is possible Riplinger is simply not familiar enough with the subject.

H. Wayne House notes that New Age Bible Versions goes beyond previous King James Only works, in "developing a conspiracy theory for the KJV-only view", and arguing that modern versions are influenced by New Age thought. House goes on to suggest that Riplinger "claims some sense of divine inspiration for her work" and that New Age Bible Versions is "replete with logical, philosophical, theological, biblical, and technical errors".

S. E. Schnaiter reviewed her book, New Age Bible Versions, and said, "Riplinger appears to be another of those who rush to [the KJV's] defense, alarmed by the proliferation of its modern rivals, armed with nothing more than the blunderbuss of ad hominem apologetic, when what is needed is the keenness of incisive evaluation."

Jeffrey Straub suggests that Riplinger has "fallen out of favor among many fundamentalists due to her unusual associations, shrill tone, and dubious background".

== Works ==
- New Age Bible Versions. Monroe Falls, Ohio: A.V. Publications. 1993. ISBN 978-0-9635845-0-2.
- The Language of the King James Bible. Ararat, VA: A. V. Publications. 1998.
- In Awe of Thy Word: Understanding the King James Bible Its Mystery and History Letter by Letter. Ararat, Va.: A V Publications. 2004. ISBN 978-0-9635845-2-6.
- Which Bible Is God's Word?. Hearthstone Publishing, Limited. 1994. ISBN 978-1-879366-81-7.
- Hazardous Materials: Greek and Hebrew Study Dangers, the Voice of Strangers, the Men Behind the Smokescreen, Burning Bibles Word by Word. A. V. Publications. 2008. ISBN 978-0-9794117-6-2.

== Sources ==
- Barker, Kenneth L. (1996). The Accuracy of the NIV. Grand Rapids: Baker Books. ISBN 978-0-8010-5639-0.
- Leazer, Gary H. (1995). Fundamentalism & Freemasonry: The Southern Baptist Investigation of the Fraternal Order. New York: M. Evans. ISBN 978-0-87131-775-9.
- Malley, Brian (2004). How the Bible Works: An Anthropological Study of Evangelical Biblicism. Walnut Creek, CA: AltaMira Press. ISBN 978-0-7591-0665-9.
- Maxwell, Joe (October 23, 1995). "King James-only advocates experience renaissance". Christianity Today. 39 (23): 86 – via Proquest.
- Neville, G. (October 1, 1999). "Science and Tradition: F. J. A. Hort and His Critics". The Journal of Theological Studies. 50 (2): 560–582. doi:10.1093/jts/50.2.560. ISSN 0022-5185.
- White, James R. (1995). The King James Only Controversy: Can You Trust Modern Translations?. Minneapolis, MN: Bethany House Publishers. ISBN 1-55661-575-2.
- Williams, James B. (2014). From the Mind of God to the Mind of Man: A Layman's Guide to How We Got Our Bible. Greenville, SC: Ambassador International. ISBN 978-1-62020-404-7.
- Zimmerman, Sarah (July 27, 1995). "Book's claims labeled 'outrageous'". California Southern Baptist. 54 (15).
