= Trinitarian Bible Society =

Organization founded in 1831

- Predecessor: British and Foreign Bible Society
- Formation: 1831
- Website: www.tbsbibles.org

The Trinitarian Bible Society was founded in 1831 "to promote the Glory of God and the salvation of men by circulating, both at home and abroad, in dependence on the Divine blessing, the Holy Scriptures, which are given by inspiration of God and are able to make men wise unto salvation through faith which is in Christ Jesus."

The Trinitarian Bible Society members separated from the British and Foreign Bible Society, itself founded in 1804, due to two controversies:

- The Apocrypha Controversy, over inclusion of the Biblical Apocrypha in some Bibles published in Europe.
- Inclusion of an adherent of Unitarianism as an officer in the Society, and refusal of the Society to open every meeting with prayer.

The arguments came into the open during the Society's Annual Meeting in May 1831. The membership voted six to one to retain the ecumenical status quo. On 7 December 1831, over two thousand people gathered in Exeter Hall in London to form the Trinitarian Bible Society, explicitly endorsing the Trinitarian position, and rejecting the apocryphal books.

== Early years ==
Ultra-dispensationalist E. W. Bullinger was clerical secretary of the Society from 1867 until his death in 1913. Activities during his secretariat include:

- Completion of a Hebrew version of the New Testament under contract with Christian David Ginsburg after the death of Isaac Salkinson. The first edition was published in 1885.
- Publication of Ginsburg's first edition of the Old Testament, along with his Introduction to the Massoretico-Critical Edition of the Hebrew Bible in 1897.
- Formation of the Brittany Evangelical Mission Society under Pasteur LeCoat and translation of the Bible into the Breton language.
- First Protestant Portuguese Reference Bible.
- Distribution of Spanish language Bibles in Spain after the Spanish Revolution of 1868.

== Later years ==
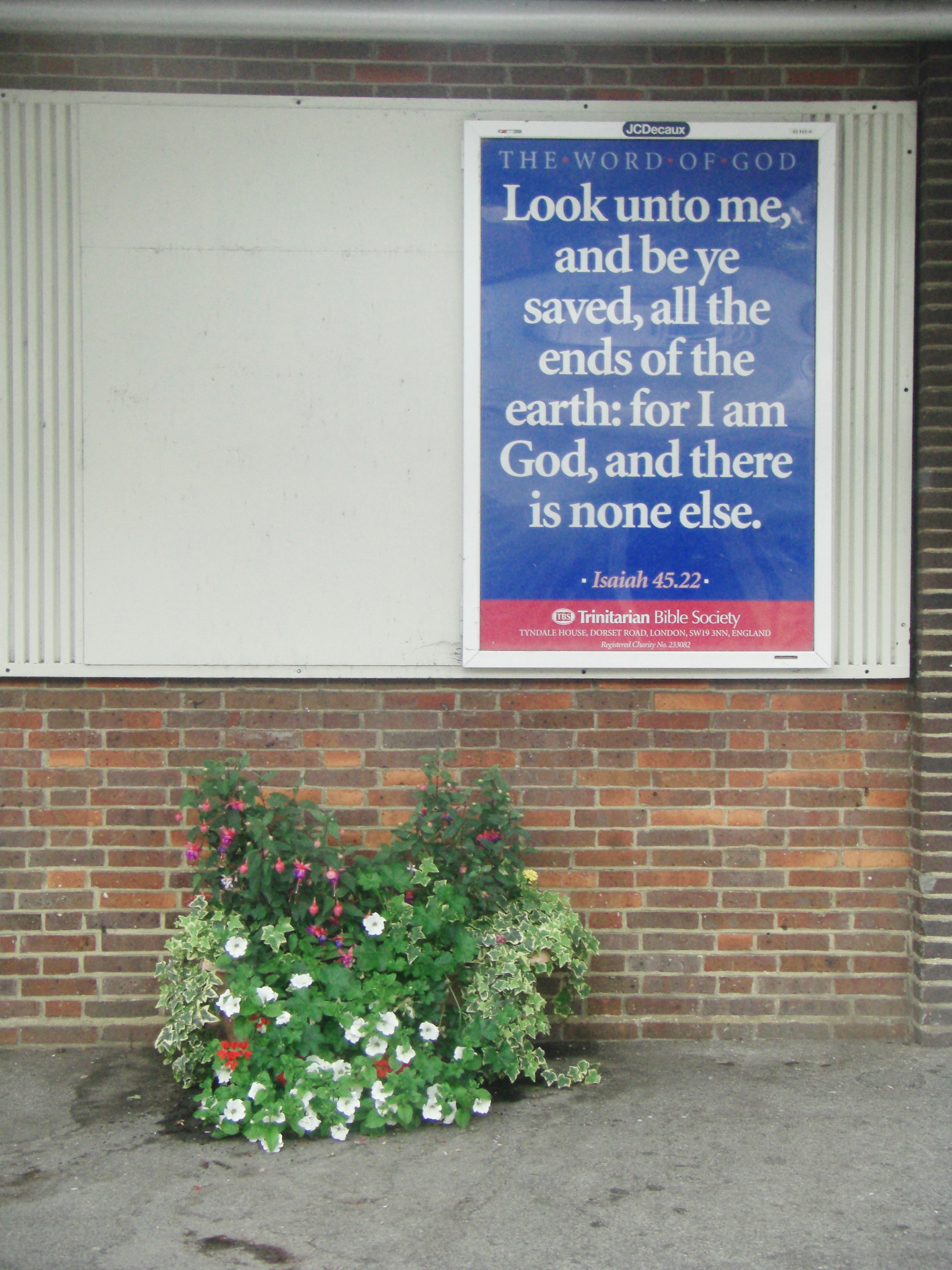
Poster produced by the Society at Chichester railway station, West Sussex in 2011.

The Society provides Bibles and Christian literature (from a historically Reformed perspective) to the world. They have chapters in many countries such as Australia, New Zealand and Brazil.

Their primary function is to translate and disseminate worldwide Bibles in languages other than English. The translation of Bibles into non-English languages is based on the Hebrew Masoretic Text and Greek New Testament edition of the Textus Receptus compiled by F. H. A. Scrivener and published in 1894.

The Society sells copies of the King James Version of the Bible, as well as Scriptures in other languages, to the general public. These Scriptures are printed by the Society itself. They also sell or give away Scripture-based Christian literature, such as tracts and children's items in English and other languages.

The Society produces a magazine, The Quarterly Record, and sponsors meetings during which the Society's work and issues surrounding translation and text are discussed.

== King James Only ==
The Trinitarian Bible Society has been associated with the King James Only movement, due to its exclusive sales of the KJV Bible in English and number of articles defending the KJV and against other modern versions such as the NASB, NIV, ESV, and NKJV. However, the Society stated "The Trinitarian Bible Society does not believe the Authorised Version to be a perfect translation, only that it is the best available translation in the English language." Also the allegation is belied by the fact that the Society sells foreign translations, for instance the Dutch Statenvertaling, which do not precisely agree with the KJV in the translation of every phrase; examples in the case of the Statenvertaling include alternative translations of non-identical meaning which were relegated by the KJV translators to a marginal note; sometimes the English language NKJV has an equivalent rendering to the Statenvertaling where it differs from the KJV (at least from its main text rather than marginal rendering).

Unlike others in the King James Only movement, the Society claims, "The supernatural power involved in the process of inspiration, and in the result of inspiration, was exerted only in the original production of the sixty-six Canonical books of the Bible (2 Peter 1:20-21; 2 Peter 3:15-16)."

"Translations from the original languages are likewise to be considered the written Word of God in so far as these translations are accurate as to the form and content of the Original."

"Translations made since New Testament times must use words chosen by uninspired men to translate God's words. For this reason no translation of the Word of God can have an absolute or definitive status. The final appeal must always be to the original languages, in the Traditional Hebrew and Greek texts."

== See also ==
- Bible version debate
- Modern English Bible translations
