= Peter Ruckman =

American pastor and author (1921–2016)

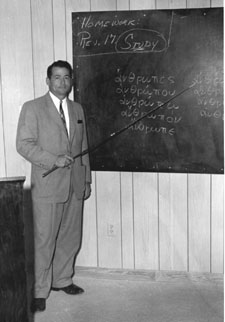
- Born: November 19, 1921; Wilmington, Delaware
- Died: April 21, 2016 (aged 94); Pensacola, Florida
- Occupations: Pastor, teacher

Peter Sturges Ruckman (November 19, 1921 – April 21, 2016) was an American Independent Baptist pastor, author, Bible teacher, and founder of the Pensacola Bible Institute in Pensacola, Florida (not to be confused with Pensacola Christian College).

Ruckman was known for his belief that the King James Version of the Bible (KJV) constituted "advanced revelation" or "new revelation", and was the final preserved word of God in the English language. He was also a proponent of Christian Zionism, dispensationalism, and the doctrine of eternal security.

== Personal life ==
A native of Wilmington, Delaware, Ruckman was a son of Colonel John Hamilton Ruckman (1888–1966) and a grandson of General John Wilson Ruckman (1858–1921). Ruckman was raised in Topeka, Kansas, attended Kansas State University, and earned a bachelor's degree from the University of Alabama.

Ruckman entered the U.S. Army in 1944 as a second lieutenant and volunteered to serve with the occupation forces in Japan. While there, Ruckman studied Zen Buddhism, and spoke of "the experience of nirvana, which the Zen call samadhi, the dislocation of the spirit from the body". Ruckman returned to the United States "uneasy, unsettled, full of demons". He worked as a disc jockey and radio announcer by day and a drummer in various bands by night. After he began to hear voices, he met with a Jesuit priest to explore joining the Roman Catholic Church. On March 14, 1949, Ruckman received Jesus Christ after talking with evangelist Hugh F. Pyle in the studios of WEAR radio in Pensacola. Ruckman attended Bob Jones University, where he received a master's and doctorate degree in religion.

Ruckman served as pastor of Bible Baptist Church in Pensacola, and his writings and recorded sermons were published by his Bible Baptist Bookstore. Like his father, Peter Ruckman had artistic talent, and he often illustrated his sermons in chalk and pastels while preaching. In 1965, Ruckman founded Pensacola Bible Institute, in part because of disagreements with other institutions with regard to translations of the Bible in English. Ruckman continued teaching a Sunday school class and participating in other church-related activities until April 2015, when he retired at 93.

Ruckman married three times, the first two marriages ending in divorce. He had ten children. His son P. S. Ruckman Jr., a professor and authority on presidential pardons, apparently killed his two sons and himself.

== Beliefs ==
=== King James Onlyism ===
Ruckman believed in "King James Onlyism", arguing that the KJV provided "advanced revelation" beyond that discernible in the underlying Textus Receptus Greek text, and was therefore the final authority in all matters of faith and practice. Ruckman believed that any edition of the Bible not based on the text of the KJV was heretical and could lead one to lose not only their "testimony [and] ministry" but even their life.

Ruckman distinguished between the Textus Receptus of the KJV, and the numerically fewer manuscripts of the Alexandrian text-type underlying most modern New Testament versions. Ruckman characterized those who endorsed the latter as members of the "Alexandrian Cult" who believe that while the autographs were God-inspired, they have been lost and that therefore there is "no final, absolute written authority of God anywhere on this earth". Ruckman also wrote that the Septuagint was a hoax perpetrated by the "Alexandrian cult" under the leadership of early Christian theologian Origen (as part of his Hexapla) in the early third century A.D. in order to subvert belief in the integrity of the Bible.

Ruckman's position on the exclusive authority of the KJV was opposed by many supporters of biblical inerrancy, including signers of the Chicago Statement on Biblical Inerrancy who specifically denied "that any essential element of the Christian faith is affected by the absence of the autographs [and] further deny that this absence renders the assertion of Biblical inerrancy invalid or irrelevant". Even a majority of those who support the King James Only movement reject Ruckman's position that the English KJV is superior to the existing Hebrew and Greek manuscripts. They also criticize Ruckman because "his writings are so acerbic, so offensive and mean-spirited that the entire movement has become identified with his kind of confrontational attitude".

The website of Ruckman's press notes that although some have called his writings "mean spirited", "we refer to them as 'truth with an attitude'". According to Beacham and Bauder, "Ruckman is without any doubt the most caustic and abusive among King James-Only partisans". James R. White states in his book The King James Only Controversy that to call Ruckman "outspoken is to engage in an exercise in understatement. Caustic is too mild a term; bombastic is a little more accurate... There is no doubt that Peter S. Ruckman is brilliant, in a strange sort of way. His mental powers are plainly demonstrated in his books, though most people do not bother to read far enough to recognize this due to the constant stream of invective that is to be found on nearly every page. And yet his cocky confidence attracts many people to his viewpoint." In Ruckman's words:

God called me to sit at this typewriter and pour forth VINEGAR, ACID, VITRIOL, AND CLEANING FLUID on the leading conservative and fundamental scholars of 1900 through 1990.^{[emphasis in original]}

=== Triadology ===
Ruckman argued that the Trinity is typified in creation and within human nature itself. As a trichotomist, he believed man was composed of body, soul, and spirit, which reflected the Trinity because he was made in the image of God. Ruckman argued that the soul typified the Father, the body the Son, and the Holy Spirit the spirit. Ruckman also argued that the Trinity was typified by nature itself, for instance as water that can exist as ice, steam, or liquid, yet remain one substance. Nevertheless, he conceded that nothing in nature could totally explain the Trinity.

Ruckman rejected the language of begetting, such as in Psalm 2:7, to mean the eternal origin of the Son of God; he rather interpreted it to mean the incarnation of Jesus Christ.

=== Dispensationalism ===
Ruckman was a proponent of dispensationalism. However, he taught that these biblical dispensations had its own system of salvation. According to Ruckman, in the Old Testament, salvation was obtained through a combination of faith and works, whereas in the Church Age, salvation is through faith alone. He further argued that during the future tribulation period, the system would revert to a works based framework as in the Old Testament. Nevertheless, Ruckman strongly rejected mid-Acts dispensationalism, which he called hyperdispensationalism.

=== Soteriology ===
Ruckman taught a strictly literal interpretation of Romans 10:9–10, asserting that an audible confession was necessary to salvation and that those who merely believed without verbally confessing Jesus Christ remained unsaved.

=== Christian Zionism ===
Ruckman taught that the Abrahamic Covenant of Genesis 12 remained unconditional. He denounced antisemitism and the Holocaust, describing persecution of the Jews as "irrational" and "supernaturally satanic". He also rejected antisemitic conspiracy theories, including The Protocols of the Elders of Zion.

=== Other beliefs ===
Ruckman defended the doctrine of eternal security and believed that even if a believer apostatized, he would be saved, though he would lose his rewards. He held a number of unique doctrines, including that angels were men of about 30-years-old, that women will receive male bodies in the rapture, and that there were two global floods.

Ruckman once said that he would have joined the Ku Klux Klan had they not been antisemitic, because he agreed with "everything else they say".

Ruckman acknowledged that the New Testament contained no specific law against interracial marriage, but he cautioned Christians against the practice to protect their "testimony" among other believers. Relying on a racial taxonomy based on the biblical sons of Noah, Ruckman taught that intermarriage between descendants of Ham (African) and Japheth (European) was "disastrous" and produced "wild" physical combinations. Conversely, he argued that marriages between descendants of Shem (Asian, Native American, and Middle Eastern) and Japheth "turns out good (sic)", claiming that most "beauty queens are Shemetic and Japhetic put together". Ruckman claimed his own facial features indicated that he had "Shemitic blood".

== Selected works ==
- Ruckman, Peter S. (2009). Ruckman Reference Bible. Pensacola, FL: Bible Baptist Bookstore. ISBN 9781580269001.
  - Ruckman, Peter S. (2019). King Jeimseu Seonggyeong Reokkeuman Juseok Seonggyeong 킹제임스 성경 럭크만 주석성경 [Ruckman Reference Bible] (in Korean). Word Preservation Society (말씀보존학회). ISBN 9791187227601. (translation)
- Ruckman, Peter S. (1999). The "Errors" in the King James Bible (Revised ed.). Pensacola, FL: Bible Baptist Bookstore. ISBN 1-58026-098-5. OCLC 45308102.
- Ruckman, Peter S. (1998). The Full Cup. Pensacola, FL: Bible Baptist Bookstore. ISBN 1-58026-484-0. OCLC 70250829. (Ruckman's autobiography)
- Ruckman, Peter S. (1997). The Christian's Handbook of Manuscript Evidence. Pensacola, FL: Bible Baptist Bookstore. ISBN 1-58026-076-4. OCLC 52712044.
- Ruckman, Peter S. (1997). Black is Beautiful. Pensacola, FL: Bible Believers Press. OCLC 931805985.
- Ruckman, Peter S. (1994). Discrimination: The Key to Sanity. Pensacola, FL: Bible Believers Press. ISBN 9781580262217.
- Ruckman, Peter S. (1964). The Bible "Babel": a critical and practical survey of the motives and methods of twentieth century Bible revisors. Pensacola, FL: Bible Baptist Bookstore. ISBN 9781580262071. OCLC 51260387.
