= Maurice A. Robinson =

American biblical scholar

Maurice Arthur Robinson
- Born: October 13, 1947 (age 79); Quincy, Massachusetts
- Occupations: Biblical scholar, professor, textual critic
- Known for: Byzantine-priority method of New Testament textual criticism
- Title: Research professor of New Testament and Greek (retired)
- Spouse: Renee Guscott
- Children: Jean-Paul Pierre

Academic background
- Education: B.S. (1969), M.Div. (1973), Th.M. (1975), Ph.D. (1982)
- Alma mater: Southwestern Baptist Theological Seminary
- Thesis: "Scribal Habits among Manuscripts of the Apocalypse" (1982)
- Doctoral advisor: James A. Brooks

Academic work
- Discipline: New Testament and Greek
- Sub-discipline: Textual criticism
- Institutions: Southeastern Baptist Theological Seminary
- Notable works: The New Testament in the Original Greek: Byzantine Textform 2005

Maurice Arthur Robinson (born October 13, 1947) is an American professor of New Testament and Greek (retired) and a proponent of the Byzantine-priority method of New Testament textual criticism.

== Background and education ==
Robinson was born in Quincy, Massachusetts, to Arthur and Olga Robinson, but grew up in Bradenton, Florida. He earned his B.A. (1969) in English and secondary education from the University of South Florida, M.Div. (1973) and Th.M. (1975) from Southeastern Baptist Theological Seminary, and Ph.D. (1982) from Southwestern Baptist Theological Seminary (dissertation: "Scribal Habits among Manuscripts of the Apocalypse"). Robinson married Renee Guscott in 1970.

== Career ==
Robinson served as assistant professor of biblical studies and languages at St. Petersburg Baptist College (1982–1984), associate professor of biblical studies and languages at Luther Rice Seminary (1985–1991), and then joined the faculty of Southeastern Baptist Theological Seminary in 1991, where he served as associate professor (1991–1996), professor (1996–2002), senior professor (2002–2014), and research professor (2014–2016) of New Testament and Greek. Robinson also served as pastor of two churches during the years 1985–1991 and 1993–1997.

Robinson is best known as a proponent of the Byzantine-priority method of New Testament textual criticism. This method maintains that when differences appear among the manuscripts of the Greek New Testament, the best representation of the original text is usually found in the agreement of most manuscripts, that is, a "consensus text" which "reflects a unified dominance that permeates the vast majority of manuscripts."

Robinson is a member of the Evangelical Theological Society (1984–present) and has presented over 20 papers at its regional and national meetings (see below for a selected bibliography).

In 2014 on the occasion of Robinson being announced research professor of New Testament and Greek a Festschrift was published in his honor: Digging for the Truth: Collected Essays regarding the Byzantine Text of the Greek New Testament (Norden: FocusYourMission). Contributors included Timothy Friberg, Andrew Wilson, Paul Himes, Edward Gravely, Timothy Finney, James Borland, Mike Arcieri, et al.

== Interesting facts ==
- In 1985–1986 Robinson created one of the first publicly-available digital editions of the Textus Receptus (TR) by manually typing out the entire Greek text of Robert Estienne’s 1550 edition over a 9-month period in his "spare time from teaching duties." It was this text, once thoroughly proofread and corrected, that Robinson in the late 1980s used to create the first free digital editions of Scrivener's TR, the Elzevir TR, Westcott-Hort's text (with notations of all variations from the text of Nestle-Aland [26th ed.]), and "the earliest continuous electronic rendering of the RP Byzantine Textform."
- During the years 1995–1998 Robinson's own spoken word format of the entire Greek New Testament in modified (American) Erasmian pronunciation was recorded and is available both in various Bible software platforms and online as a free download.

== From reasoned eclectic to Byzantine priorist ==
Robinson's move away from reasoned eclecticism, to which he still held in writing as late as 1975, is traced directly to the influence of noted New Testament textual critic Kenneth W. Clark, who guided Robinson in a mentored program of study from 1971 to 1977 and was guest-supervisor for his Th.M. thesis. Clark's influence on Robinson focused on a skepticism of the necessarily "subjective and tendentious" nature of reasoned eclecticism, the need for a "critical history of transmission," and the proposition that reasoned eclectic procedure should accept "a stronger role for the Byzantine Textform coupled with a strong transmissional historical view." At least the first two of these come out clearly in Robinson's Th.M. thesis, where he opined, "Eclecticism reigns, and it has left textual criticism in a state of fluidity. ... [O]ur objectivity has been surrendered to the whims of individual critics. ... Our feet have become mired and mudbound in the trenches of subjectivity." He advocated that critics must determine the "history of the transmission of the New Testament text viewed in its total chronological perspective," and that the "primary value of texttypes is their utilization in reconstructing the history of textual transmission." In contrast to his current Byzantine-priority stance, Robinson stated at the time that "it is more likely that the original text itself was what we today would term 'mixed,'" that "[a]ll known texttypes proceeded from this original 'mixed' [form], coming into existence as types primarily from local-text situations," and even that "the uncontrolled, popular text of the second century ... corrupted the original [Textform] with its own scraps of oral tradition and theologically motivated alterations." Even then Robinson expressed that "the Alexandrian text [could] have arisen as the first attempt to produce an alternative controlled text against the multiplicity of wild texts which characterized the Western groups," a view to which he still holds more than 40 years later. Robinson's obsession with constantly evaluating "all pertinent transmissional and transcriptional factors ... in relation to the various aspects of external and internal criteria" before making any final decisions regarding the text to be established may be summarized in how he describes his method: "reasoned transmissionalism."

As mentioned above, the genesis of Robinson's career dedication to "reasoned transmissionalism" essentially goes back to Clark and is best expressed in Robinson's own words:

Clark’s views, written and oral, laid the basis for my shift away from reasoned eclecticism to a transmission-based hypothesis; this ultimately led to my Byzantine-priority position. Clark’s hints and allegations in his published material were enhanced by his private tutelage, where he lamented over much of his previous career, having focused on reasonable internal and external principles that nevertheless led to faulty conclusions. As he expressed to me in the mid-1970s, had he been 30 years younger, he would chart a new course, predicated on transmissional probabilities, including the strong view that the autograph text of any New Testament book would more likely be preserved within a single existing texttype rather than amid an eclectic conglomeration drawn from multiple sources. Clark suggested that the question of which texttype should be dually established from (1) the likelihood of its archetypal reconstructability, and (2) the quantitative and qualitative evidence relating to the transmission and perpetuation of that archetype. Clark’s final conclusion shocked my reasoned eclectic viewpoint: he suggested that the Byzantine Textform — to the extent that such could be established in its archetypal form — was the most likely candidate for autograph originality against all rival claimants, whether favored Greek manuscripts, other texttypes or subjective internal factors. As Clark told me then, "I am now too old to explore and delineate this position; but you are young, and should pursue it." That has been my endeavor since approximately 1975.

== Magnum opus ==
Robinson's single largest project is the text of the Pericope adulterae (PA; also Pericope de adultera), or the passage of the adulteress (John 7:53-8:11). Having examined more than 1750 continuous-text manuscripts related to the passage or its perimeter, he completely collated the nearly 1500 manuscripts and 500 lectionaries which contain the passage. This was done at the Institut für Neutestamentliche Textforschung in Münster, Germany, primarily during a 1997–1998 sabbatical leave, with briefer visits in the years 1999, 2000, and 2005. The computerized data entry of 15 years' worth of primary collation material was completed in 2012, as was the volume, "The Greek Manuscript Witnesses to the Pericope Adulterae: A Comprehensive Collation of All Accessible and Readable Continuous-text and Lectionary Manuscripts according to the Various Locations in which the Passage is Present." Another volume appeared in 2014, "A Comprehensive Bibliography of Material relating to the Pericope Adulterae (John 7:53-8:11): Various Entries Annotated, generally by Direct Quotation from the Source Cited." Both volumes, including Robinson's original collation documents and handwritten notes, may be accessed at the SEBTS library and are preparatory for the final work, still in progress: The Text of the Pericope Adulterae (John 7:53-8:11), 3 vols. Vol. 1: Text and Apparatus; Vol. 2: The Textual Interrelationships among the Manuscripts which contain the Pericope Adulterae; Vol. 3: The Archetype of the Pericope Adulterae and its Relationship to the Gospel of John. Until these volumes appear, two articles by Robinson remain of primary interest in relation to his magnum opus: "Preliminary Observations Regarding the Pericope Adulterae based upon Fresh Collations of nearly all Continuous-Text Manuscripts and all Lectionary Manuscripts containing the Passage"; and, "The Pericope Adulterae: A Johannine Tapestry with Double Interlock."

== Publications ==
Robinson (with William Pierpont) is most recognized for editing a Greek New Testament based on Byzantine-priority principles which previously had been explored, formulated, and expressed in various papers and publications. The Greek text, although prepared by Robinson in digital form several years earlier, appeared in 1991 in an initial softback edition without accents or breathing marks and was titled, The New Testament in the Original Greek according to the Byzantine/Majority Textform (Atlanta: The Original Word). Fourteen years later a more elegant edition appeared, The New Testament in the Original Greek: Byzantine Textform 2005 (Southborough, MA: Chilton Book Publishing), a fully accented edition with an apparatus showing every variation of the text from that of the standard Nestle-Aland Novum Testamentum Graece (27th ed.), marginal readings indicating major splits in the Greek manuscript tradition, and a 53-page appendix explaining "The Case for Byzantine Priority." This was followed in 2010 by a corrected Reader's Edition, produced in cooperation with Jeffrey Dodson (who was responsible for the formatting).

Some titles of Robinson's other publications include:

- "Σπερμολογος: Did Paul Preach from Jesus' Parables?"
- Ruth and Jonah: Parsing Guide for the Hebrew Text.
- Indexes to All Editions of Brown-Driver-Briggs Hebrew Lexicon and Thayer's Greek Lexicon.
- "The Significance of the Word אות for Biblical Studies."
- "Hype and Nonsense: Right and Wrong Ways to Evaluate the Playing Strength of Commercially-Available Chess Computers."
- "Two Passages in Mark: A Critical Test for the Byzantine-Priority Hypothesis."
- "The Recensional Nature of the Alexandrian Text-Type: A Response to Selected Criticisms of the Byzantine-Priority Theory."
- "Investigating Text-Critical Dichotomy: A Critique of Modern Eclectic Praxis from a Byzantine-Priority Perspective."
- "New Testament Textual Criticism: The Case for Byzantine Priority."
- "Crossing Boundaries in New Testament Textual Criticism: Historical Revisionism and the Case of Frederick Henry Ambrose Scrivener."
- "The Case for Byzantine Priority."
- "Preliminary Observations Regarding the Pericope Adulterae based upon Fresh Collations of nearly all Continuous-Text Manuscripts and all Lectionary Manuscripts containing the Passage."
- "William Grover Pierpont: 26 January 1915 – 20 February 2003."
- "In Search of the Alexandrian Archetype: Observations from a Byzantine-Priority Perspective."
- "The Case for Byzantine Priority."
- "Amid Perfect Contempt, a Place for the Genuine: The Long Ending of Mark as Canonical Verity."
- "Rule 9, Isolated Variants, and the 'Test-Tube' Nature of the NA27/UBS4 Text: A Byzantine-Priority Perspective."
- "The Rich Man and Lazarus – Luke 16:19–31. Text-Critical Notes."
- Analytical Lexicon of New Testament Greek: Revised and Updated.
- "The Pericope Adulterae: A Johannine Tapestry with Double Interlock."
- "'It’s All About Variants' — unless 'No Longer Written.'"
- "Incomplete Truth and Its Consequences: A Clarification of the Manuscript Evidence regarding 2 Corinthians 1:6–7."

== Papers ==
At various professional venues, but especially those of the Evangelical Theological Society (ETS), Robinson has presented many papers, the titles of some of which are:

- "The Credibility of the Majority Text Theory and its Value for Apologetics."
- "Majority Text Affirmations and Peter's Denials: On Keeping Critical Issues Distinct."
- "The Case for the Byzantine Textform: A New Approach to 'Majority Text' Theory."
- "The Ending of Mark in Codex Vaticanus: A Feasible Solution."
- "The Recensional Nature of the Alexandrian Text-Type: A Response to Selected Criticisms of the Byzantine-Priority Theory."
- "The Conundrum of Acts 12:25."
- "The Bondage of the Word: Copyright and the Bible."
- "Incipit/Explicit: Lectionary Influence on the Continuous-Text Manuscripts belonging to the Byzantine Textform."
- "Incomplete Truth and its Consequences: A Clarification of the Manuscript Evidence regarding 2 Corinthians 1:6-7."
- "The Integrity of the Early New Testament Text: A Collation-based Comparison utilizing the Papyri of the Second and Third Centuries."
- "The Byzantine Portions of Codex Washingtonianus: A Centenary Retrospective."
- "Misquoting Jesus: Bart Ehrman's approach to the New Testament Text."
- "The Woman Taken in Adultery in the Temple (John 7:53–8:11)."
- "Eclectic Observations regarding the Current Critical Text."
- "Impossible Readings and the Original Text: The Case of Acts 4:25."
- "The Establishment of an Underlying Base Text with Variant Footnotes as a Necessary Preliminary to Translation and Exegesis."
- "The Byzantine 'Priest' Variant at Acts 5:24."
- "De facto Conjecture in the Main Text of NA27: A Further Consideration."
- "Casual Thoughts regarding some Critical Text Readings: A Byzantine-Priority Perspective."
- "Fifty Years behind the Text: Post-Retirement Reflections on a Career in NT Textual Criticism."
