= Urban Saints =

Christian youth charity

- The Urban Saints logo
- Nickname: Crusaders
- Established: 29 March 1906; 120 years ago
- Founder: Herbert Bevington
- Region served: United Kingdom and Ireland
- Chief Executive Officer: Mark Markiewicz
- Affiliations: Evangelical Alliance
- Staff: 34 (2026)
- Volunteers: 500 (2026)
- Website: http://www.urbansaints.org
- Formerly called: The Crusaders’ Union

Urban Saints is a Christian youth charity based in the United Kingdom. Previously known as The Crusaders’ Union, or Crusaders for short, it has been operating since the early 1900s. Urban Saints is a member of the Evangelical Alliance.

== History ==
The original Crusaders logo

The original Crusaders group was formed in 1900 in north London by Rev Albert Kestin, with the intention of teaching the Bible to young people who did not attend church. Several similar groups started in the years that followed and in 1906, under the leadership of Herbert Bevington, the leaders of eleven groups voted to form the Crusaders’ Union as an umbrella organisation. By 1939 there were 256 groups. The Crusaders' movement spread to other areas of the British Empire, leading to the formation of similar organisations such as The Crusader Union of Australia in 1930.

In 2006, the organisation became known as Urban Saints. The name was revealed at a concert at the Royal Albert Hall to celebrate the centenary of the Crusaders’ Union.

In 2000, Matt Summerfield became chief executive. Since then, the organisation has developed Energize, online resources, discipleship activities and discussions, and videos for youth and children’s groups. As of 2018, Energize had over 1600 subscribers.

Urban Saints also offers summer camps, overseas adventure trips and additional needs training. Urban Saints own Urban Saints Westbrook, a residential centre and campsite on the Isle of Wight. This site has been in operation since 1948.

In 2017, following the arrival of Richard Langmead as chief executive, the organisation's strategy placed focus on planting and supporting new groups in churches, schools and communities across the UK and Ireland.
