= Herbert M. Wolf =

Herbert Martin Wolf (July 15, 1938 – October 18, 2002) was an American biblical scholar and professor of Old Testament.

== Background and education ==
Wolf was born July 15, 1938, to a family of German immigrants in Springfield, Massachusetts. His wife Clara, whom he met while president of the youth group at his home church, had immigrated from Russia in 1951. Together they had three children, David, Larissa and Phillip. David went on to become the head men's soccer coach at Westmont College and their youngest, Philip, currently leads the Point Loma Nazarene University men's soccer program. Wolf earned his B.A. from Wheaton College in 1960, his Th.M. from Dallas Theological Seminary and his Ph.D in Old Testament and Semitic languages at Brandeis University in 1967.

== Career ==
Wolf joined the faculty at Wheaton College in 1967, where he continued as professor of Old Testament for more than 30 years. In 2001, he was honored with the Distinguished Service to Alma Mater award.

Wolf was on the team of translators responsible for the original New American Standard Bible, first published in its complete form in 1971. He was invited by Committee on Bible Translation in 1976 to assist it in the final editorial review of the first edition of the Old Testament of the New International Version of the Bible. He was a contributor to the NIV Study Bible notes. He was the principal contributor to the notes on the books of Judges, Proverbs and Haggai. See The NIV Study Bible, Copyright ©1985, 1995, 2002, 2008, 2011, 2020 by Zondervan, Grand Rapids, Michigan 49546, USA.

== Death ==
Wolf was diagnosed with leukemia in the fall of 2000, and died on October 18, 2002.

== Publications ==
- Haggai and Malachi: Rededication and Renewal in Everyman's Bible Commentary (1976) ISBN 0-8024-2037-0
- Interpreting Isaiah: the Suffering and Glory of the Messiah (1985) ISBN 0-310-39061-3
- An Introduction to the Old Testament Pentateuch (1991, 2007) ISBN 0-8024-4156-4
- Book of Judges in the Expositor's Bible Commentary series (1992) ISBN 0-310-60893-7
