= Texe Marrs =

American Christian fundamentalist minister (1944–2019)

- Born: July 15, 1944; Fred, Texas, U.S.
- Died: November 23, 2019 (aged 75); Spicewood, Texas, U.S.
- Spouse: Wanda Marrs
- Website: texemarrs.com

Texe William Marrs (July 15, 1944 – November 23, 2019) was an American writer and radio host, who ran two fundamentalist Christian ministries, Power of Prophecy Ministries and Bible Home Church, both based in Austin, Texas. His teachings included elements of antisemitism, anti-Catholicism, Holocaust denial, the Khazar hypothesis of Ashkenazi ancestry, Illuminati and Freemasonry conspiracy theories.

He was an officer in the United States Air Force for 20 years, reaching the rank of captain, and a faculty member at the University of Texas.

== Media coverage ==
Marrs received coverage from the news media for his claims that:

- The Oklahoma City bombing was planned and carried out by the American government, and that the terrorist Timothy McVeigh was framed.
- The goal of the Jews is "the annihilation of almost every Gentile man, woman, and child and the establishment of a satanic Jewish-led global dictatorship".
- Hillary Clinton is a doctrinaire Marxist who has recruited other America-hating subversives for key administration posts. Hillary Clinton also has Orwellian political ambitions. According to Marrs: "Bill Clinton is an establishment hack, a member of the traitorous Trilateral Commission, the Bilderbergers, and Council of Foreign Relations. He and Hillary are deep into Egyptian occultism and Masonic magic."
- "Newt Gingrich is a closet Marxist and member of the occultic secret society known as the Bohemian Grove."
- "Bob Dole is a 33rd degree Mason and a fake conservative. He's anti-Jesus Christ."
- Bill Martin's plans for a Christian naturist resort is evidence that Satan is subverting Christianity.
- Described as the "conspiracy theorist to end all conspiracy theorists" for his book Codex Magica: Secret Signs, Mysterious Symbols, and Hidden Codes of the Illuminati, which purports to expose a secret conspiracy between politicians and other famous people through modern history.
- The Vatican's plan is to be the headquarters of a new worldwide religion with the Pope as its supreme pontiff.

== Public behavior ==
Marrs has been accused of being anti-Catholic. In 1999 he alleged that former United States President George H. W. Bush would be involved in a black mass in a chamber within the Great Pyramid of Giza during the 2000 millennium celebrations. Christian writer Constance Cumbey has accused Marrs of plagiarizing material from her book Hidden Dangers of the Rainbow. She requested her name never be associated with Texe Marrs because of his exaggerations and blatant anti-Semitism.

In 2014, Marrs republished On the Jews and Their Lies.

== Books ==
- A Perfect Name for Your Pet, Texe and Wanda Marrs, Heian, San Francisco, 1983. ISBN 0893462217
- You and the Armed Forces, ARCO, 1983. ISBN 0668056851
- Careers in Computers: The High-Tech Job Guide, Monarch Press, 1984. ISBN 0671502212
- How to Prepare for the Armed Forces Test – ASVAB, Barrons, 1984. ISBN 978-0764173806
- Careers in High Technology, Irwin Professional Publications, 1985.
- High Tech Job Finder, Texe and Wanda Marrs, John Wiley & Sons, 1985. ISBN 978-0471816850
- The Great Robot Book, Texe and Wanda Marrs, Julin Messenger, 1985. ISBN 978-0671602437
- The Personal Robot Book, Robotic Industries Association, 1985. ISBN 0830618961
- High Technology Careers, Dow Jones & Irwin, 1986. ISBN 978-0870945892
- Preparation for the Armed Forces Test, MacMillan, 1986.
- The Woman's Guide to Military Service, Texe Marrs and Karen Read, Liberty Publishing Company, 1987. ISBN 978-0897091527
- Rush to Armageddon, Tyndale, 1987. ISBN 978-0842357968
- Dark Secrets of the New Age, Crossway Books, 1987. ISBN 978-0966742145
- Mystery Mark of the New Age, Crossway Books, 1988. ISBN 9780891074793
- Futuristic Careers: Jobs Today in the 21st Century Fields, Scott Foresman & Co, 1988.
- Careers with Robots, Facts On File, 1988. ISBN 978-0816012220
- Ravaged By The New Age, Living Truth Publishers, 1989. ISBN 0-9620086-1-3
- Big Sister Is Watching You, Living Truth Publishers, 1993. ISBN 9780962008696
- Project L.U.C.I.D.: The Beast 666 Universal Human Control System, Living Truth Publishers, 1996. ISBN 1-884302-02-5
- Codex Magica, RiverCrest Publishing, 2005. ISBN 9781930004047
- Protocols of the Learned Elders of Zion (introduction) Rivercrest Publishing, 2011. ISBN 978-1930004566
- Conspiracy of the Six Pointed Star: Eye-Opening Revelations and Forbidden Knowledge About Israel, the Jews, Zionism, and the Rothschilds, RiverCrest Publishing, 2011. ISBN 978-1930004573
- Holy Serpent of the Jews: The Rabbis' Secret Plan for Satan to Crush Their Enemies and Vault the Jews to Global Dominion, RiverCrest Publishing, 2016. ISBN 978-1930004986

== Videos ==
- Die America Die—The Illuminati Plan to Murder America, Confiscate Its Wealth, and Make Red China Leader of the New World Order (video), RiverCrest Publishing.
- Rothschild’s Choice: Barack Obama and the Hidden Cabal Behind the Plot to Murder America (video), RiverCrest Publishing.
- Architectural Colossus: Mysterious Monuments of the Illuminati Enshroud the World With Magic and Seduction (video), RiverCrest Publishing. ISBN 978-1930004467
- Where the Rich and Famous Dwell: Architectural Secrets of the Rothschilds, the Vanderbilts, the Rockefellers, the Astors, and Other Storied Bloodlines and Dynasties (video), RiverCrest Publishing.
