= James White (theologian) =

American Christian apologist and theologian

James Robert White
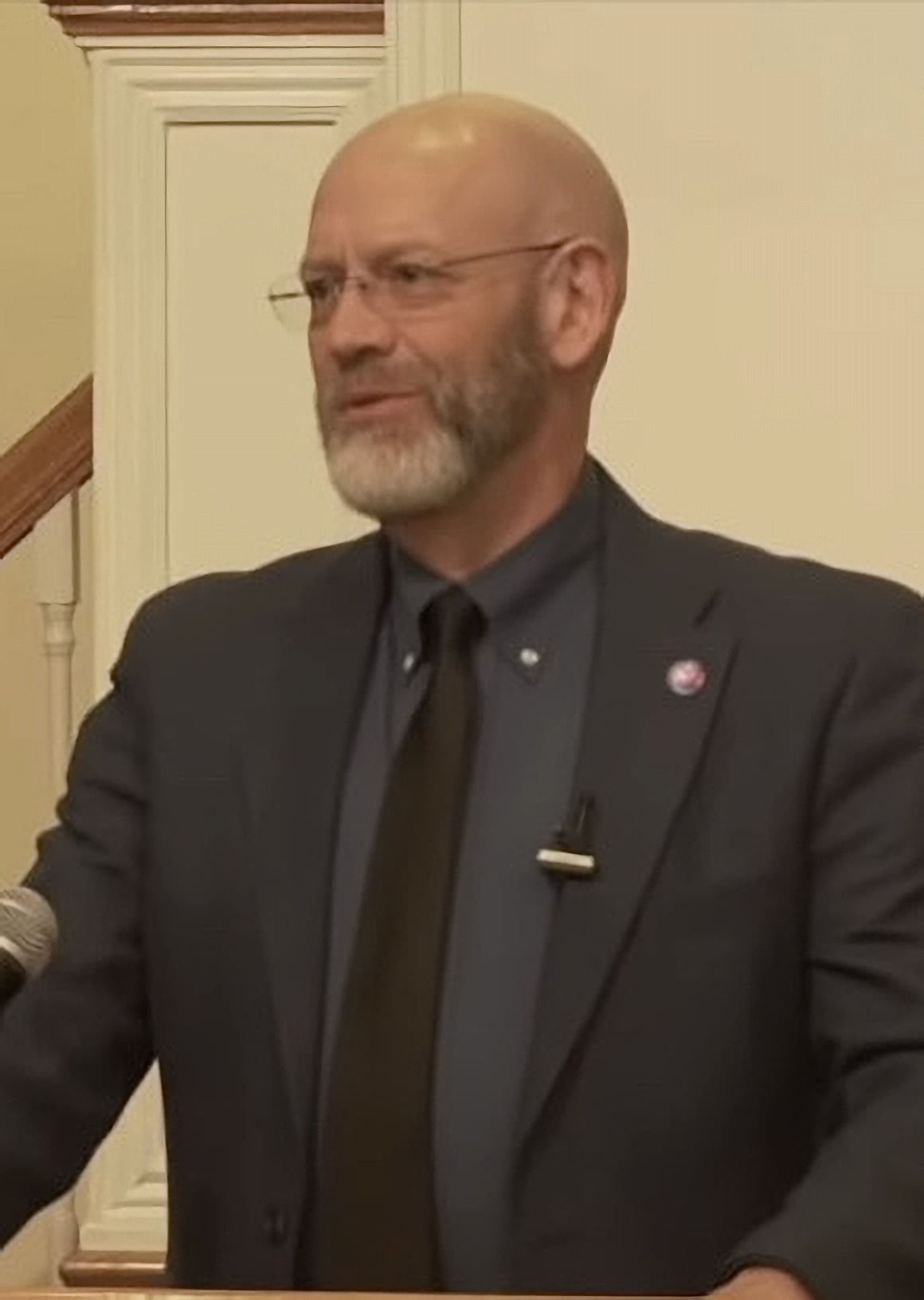
- White in 2019
- Born: Hennepin County, Minnesota, U.S.
- Education: Grand Canyon University (BA); Fuller Theological Seminary (MA); Columbia Evangelical Seminary (ThM, ThD, DMin)
- Occupations: Christian apologist; theologian; pastor; author
- Known for: Director of Alpha and Omega Ministries
- Spouse: Kelli
- Children: 2
- Theological work
- Era: Late 20th and early 21st centuries
- Tradition or movement: Reformed (Baptist)
- Main interests: Christian apologetics; Soteriology; Historical criticism; Mormonism; Catholicism; Islam
- Website: www.aomin.org/aoblog/

James Robert White is an American Christian apologist and Reformed Baptist theologian. He is the director of Alpha and Omega Ministries, a Christian apologetics organization based in Phoenix, Arizona. He is a Christian scholar and has authored several books.

== Early life and education ==
White graduated with a B.A. from Grand Canyon University (formerly known as Grand Canyon College) and an M.A. from Fuller Theological Seminary. He then obtained Th.M., Th.D., and D.Min. degrees from Columbia Evangelical Seminary, an unaccredited online school. The legitimacy of White's academic credentials has been questioned by some of his polemical interlocutors.

== Career ==
White served as an elder of Phoenix Reformed Baptist Church in Phoenix, Arizona, from 1998 until 2018. He became Scholar-in-Residence at Apologia Church in Tempe, Arizona in 2018, and was installed as one of the pastor/elders in 2019.

White is the director of Alpha and Omega Ministries, a Christian apologetics organization based in Phoenix, Arizona. As director of Alpha and Omega Ministries, White also hosts the Dividing Line Podcast and radio show on the Alpha and Omega Ministries YouTube Channel. He was also a critical consultant for the Lockman Foundation's New American Standard Bible.

White often engages in public debate, having participated in more than 170 public moderated debates, covering topics such as Calvinism, Catholicism, Islam, Mormonism, Infant baptism, the King James Only movement, Jehovah's Witnesses, and atheism. Dr. White claimed his debate against Dale Tuggy in 2025 was his 200th public moderated debate. His debate opponents have included Bart Ehrman, John Dominic Crossan, Marcus Borg, Robert M. Price, Gerry Matatics, Joe Ventilacion of Iglesia ni Cristo, Dan Barker, Jimmy Akin, and John Shelby Spong. White has criticized the King James Only movement, supported by some fundamentalists. He has argued that the King James version has multiple translation errors.

White is friends with Skillet frontman John Cooper and his wife Korey, where he has provided theological advice to the band.

White has written multiple books critical of Catholic theology, including the books; The Roman Catholic Controversy, Mary: Another Redeemer? and The Fatal Flaw.

White supports Creationism and Theonomy.

== Personal life ==
James White has an elder sister, Patty Bonds (née White), with whom he has been estranged for many years.

He is married and he and his wife have two children. He also has five living grandchildren.

White is a Reformed Baptist and a Calvinist.

== Selected works ==
- White, James R. (1990). Letters to a Mormon Elder: Eye-Opening Information for Mormons and the Christians Who Talk with Them. Southbridge, MA: Crowne Publications. ISBN 9780925703590.
- ——— (1995). The King James Only Controversy: Can You Trust the Modern Translations?. Minneapolis, Minn.: Bethany House. ISBN 978-1-55661-575-7.
- ——— (1997). Is the Mormon My Brother? Discerning the Differences between Mormonism and Christianity. Minneapolis, Minn.: Bethany House. ISBN 9780764220470.
- ——— (1998). Mary—Another Redeemer?. Minneapolis, Minn.: Bethany House. ISBN 9780764221026.
- ——— (2000). The Potter's Freedom: A Defense of the Reformation and a Rebuttal of Norman Geisler's Chosen But Free. Amityville, NY: Calvary Press. ISBN 9781879737433.
- ——— (2001). The God Who Justifies: A Comprehensive Study of the Doctrine of Justification. Minneapolis, Minn.: Bethany House. ISBN 9780764222887.
- ——— (2002). The Same Sex Controversy: Defending and Clarifying the Bible's Message about Homosexuality. Minneapolis, Minn.: Bethany House. ISBN 9780764225246.
- ——— (2002). Dangerous Airwaves: Harold Camping Refuted and Christ's Church Defended. Amityville, NY: Calvary Press. ISBN 9781879737495.
- Hunt, Dave; ——— (2004). Debating Calvinism: Five Points, Two Views. Sisters, Or.: Multnomah Publishers. ISBN 9781590522738.
- ——— (2004). Scripture Alone: Exploring the Bible's Accuracy, Authority and Authenticity. Minneapolis, Minn.: Bethany House. ISBN 978-0764220487.
- ——— (2013). What Every Christian Needs to Know About the Qur'an. Minneapolis, Minn.: Bethany House. ISBN 9780764209765.
- ——— (2019). The Forgotten Trinity: Recovering the Heart of Christian Belief. Minneapolis, Minn.: Bethany House. ISBN 978-0-7642-3382-1.

== See also ==
- Protestant opposition to papal supremacy
