= Johannes Karavidopoulos =

Greek theologian (1937–2023)

- Ιωάννης Δ. Καραβιδόπουλος
- Born: 10 February 1937; Thessaloniki
- Died: 15 April 2023 (aged 86)
- Alma mater: Aristotle University of Thessaloniki
- Employer: Aristotle University of Thessaloniki (1969–2004)
- Position held: professor emeritus (2004–)

Johannes Karavidopoulos (Ιωάννης Καραβιδόπουλος, 10 February 1937 – 15 April 2023) was a Greek New Testament scholar.

== Life ==
Karavidopoulos Ioannis Karavidopoulos was born on 10 February 1937 in Thessaloniki and died on 15 April 2023, at the age of 86.

=== Teaching ===
From 1969 to 2004 Karavidopoulos taught New Testament Interpretation at the School Theology of the Aristotle University of Thessaloniki and in 2004 he became professor emeritus.

=== Writings ===
In 1993 he was appointed to the textual committee for the United Bible Societies' Greek New Testament, or Novum Testamentum Graece, at the same time as Barbara Aland, to replace retired earlier committee members Matthew Black and Allen Wikgren.
