= International Greek New Testament Project =

The International Greek New Testament Project (IGNTP) began in 1926 as a cooperative enterprise between British and German scholars to establish a new critical edition of the New Testament. Early results of the work were critical apparatus of the Gospel of Matthew and the Gospel of Mark produced by S. C. E. Legg in the 1930s. Wartime difficulties prevented cooperation during most of the 1940s, but the project was resurrected in 1949 as a cooperative endeavour between British and North American scholars. In the meantime research was taken up by Kurt Aland and the Institut für neutestamentliche Textforschung in Münster. British and North American cooperation resulted in the publication of a critical apparatus for the Gospel of Luke in the 1980s.

Current research focuses on the Gospel of John, and the surviving majuscule manuscripts have been published in print and electronic form. The present committee comprises scholars from Europe and North America.

== Publications ==
- The New Testament in Greek, The Gospel According to St Luke, Part One. Chapters 1–12. Oxford University Press, 1984.
- The New Testament in Greek, The Gospel According to St Luke, Part Two. Chapters 13–24. Oxford University Press, 1987.
- The New Testament in Greek IV. The Gospel According to St John: Volume 1. The Papyri. Edited by W.J. Elliott and D.C. Parker. New Testament Tools and Studies 20. Leiden, E.J. Brill, 1995. ISBN 9789004099401
- The New Testament in Greek IV. The Gospel According to St John: Volume 2: The Majuscules. Edited by U.B. Schmid in association with W.J. Elliott and D.C. Parker. New Testament Tools, Studies and Documents 37. Leiden, E.J. Brill, 2007. ISBN 9789004163133
- http://www.iohannes.com
- http://www.epistulae.org

== Members ==
The following scholars have served on the committees of the IGNTP:

=== Editors ===
- G.G. Willis (Executive editor of Luke 1958–69)
- K.W. Clark (American editor 1970–88)
- J.N. Birdsall (Executive editor of Luke 1970–78)
- J.K. Elliott (Executive editor of Luke 1978–87)
- D.C. Parker (Executive editor of John 1987–present)
- W.J. Elliott (Co–editor of John 1987–2019)
- Michael W. Holmes (American editor 1988–2007)
- U.B. Schmid (Co–editor of John 2003–present)
- H.A.G. Houghton (Executive editor of Paul 2016–present)
- W. Andrew Smith (Co-Editor of Pastoral Epistles 2017–present)
- Ekaterini Tsalampouni (Co-Editor of Thessalonian Epistles 2018–present)
- Martin Karrer (Co-Editor of Hebrews 2019–present)
- Curt Niccum (Co-Editor of Colossians 2019–present)

=== Committee Membership ===
- R.H. Lightfoot (British 1948-1951, Chair 1948–51)
- A. Souter (British 1948–49, Secretary 1948–49)
- F.G. Kenyon (British 1948–49, Treasurer 1948–49)
- C.H. Dodd (British 1948–64)
- T.W. Manson (British 1948–58)
- G.D. Kilpatrick (British 1948–89, Secretary 1949–62, Vice Chair 1962–c.1987)
- H.F.D. Sparks (British 1948–83+)
- Ernest Cadman Colwell (American 1948—1970, American chair 1948–c.1970)
- R.P. Blake (American 1949–?)
- L.O. Bristol (American 1949–?)
- Robert P. Casey (American 1949–50, Patristic Chair 1949–50, British 1950–57)
- Kenneth W. Clark (American 1949–?, American editor 1970–88)
- M.S. Enslin (American 1949–?)
- F.V. Filson (American 1949–?)
- J. Geerlings (American 1949–?)
- E.J. Goodspeed (American 1949–?)
- F.C. Grant (American 1949–?, Vice Chair)
- W.H.P. Hatch (American 1949–?)
- C.H. Kraeling (American 1949–?)
- Silva Lake (1949–?)
- Bruce Manning Metzger (American 1949–83+, Chair c.1970–87)
- Merrill M. Parvis (American 1949–?, Secretary 1949–?)
- H.A. Sanders (American 1949–?)
- R.P. Blake (American 1949–?)
- Ernest W. Saunders (1949–?)
- Allen P. Wikgren (American 1949–?, Vice Chair 1949–?)
- W.D. McHardy (British 1949–78)
- Harold I. Bell (British 1949–57, Chair 1951–57)
- J.W. Hunkin (British 1949–50)
- F.S. Marsh (British 1949–51)
- C.H. Roberts (British 1949–52 and 1975–80)
- T.C. Skeat (British 1949–77, Secretary and Treasurer 1972–76)
- A. Fox (British 1949–50)
- Paul Schubert (American 1950–61, Patristic Chair 1950–61)
- A.M. Ramsey (British 1951–54)
- R.V.G. Tasker (British 1952)
- J.W.B. Barns (British 1952–67)
- E.G. Turner (British 1953–62)
- J.M. Plumley (British 1957–c.1988, Chair 1962–c.1988)
- C. K. Barrett (British 1957–65)
- I.A. Moir (British 1957–74)
- G.G. Willis (British 1958–69, Executive editor 1958–69)
- G.H.C. McGregor (British 1959–62, Chair 1959–62)
- H.S. Murphy (American, Patristic Chair 1961–62)
- M.J. Suggs (American 1963–83+, Patristic Chair 1963–73)
- S.P. Brock (British 1964–83+)
- Paul R. McReynolds (American 1965–2007, Secretary 1965–88)
- Eldon Jay Epp (American 1968–2010)
- M. Black (British 1968–83+)
- J. Neville Birdsall (British 1968–79, Executive editor 1970–77)
- Gordon D. Fee (American 1970–2012, Patristic Chair 1973–83+, Chair ?–2000)
- I.A. Sparks (American c.1970–83+, Vice Chair)
- T.S. Pattie (British 1972–2010, Secretary 1976–87, Treasurer 1976–96, Chair 1988–2007)
- J. Lionel North (British 1975–2010, Treasurer 1996–2010)
- J. Keith Elliott (British 1977–present, Executive editor 1977–87, Secretary 1987–2010)
- W.J. Elliott (British 1980–2019, Co–editor 1987–2019)
- D.C. Parker (British 1984–present, Executive Editor 1987–present)
- Carroll D. Osburn (American 1988–2002, Vice Chair 1988–95, Secretary 1995–2002)
- Thomas C. Geer Jr (American 1988–94, Secretary 1988–94)
- James A. Brooks (American 1988–98; Secretary 1994–95)
- Bart D. Ehrman (American 1988–2007, Chair 2004–6)
- Michael W. Holmes (American 1988–2015, American editor 1988–2007, Chair 2000–4, Secretary 2005–7)
- William L. Petersen (American 1989–2006)
- Caroline P. Hammond–Bammel (British 1990–95)
- J. David Thomas (British 1990–2007)
- M. Bruce Morrill (American 1992–present)
- Kim Haines Eitzen (American 2000–10, Chair 2006–10)
- Christopher M. Tuckett (British 2001–6)
- Peter M. Head (British –2003)
- Philip H. Burton (British 2001–12)
- P.J. Williams (British 2004–present, Chair 2010–20)
- Amy Anderson (American 2005–present)
- Jean–François Racine (American 2005–8)
- Roderic L. Mullen (American 2005–present)
- Ulrich B. Schmid (British 2006–present, Co–editor 2003–present)
- Hugh A.G. Houghton (British 2006–present, Treasurer 2010–20, Executive Editor 2016–present)
- Klaus Wachtel (2007–present)
- Holger Strutwolf (2007–present)
- Larry Hurtado (2008–17)
- Juan Hernández Jr. (2008–present)
- Tommy Wasserman (2009–present, Secretary 2010–20)
- Bill Warren (2010–present)
- Claire Clivaz (2010–present)
- Rachel Kevern (2010–16)
- Jennifer Knust (2010–18)
- Kathleen Maxwell (2010–18)
- Christopher Jordan (2011–14)
- Nadezhda Kavrus–Hoffmann (2011–14)
- Martin Karrer (2012–present)
- Annette Hüffmeier (2014–present)
- Christian Askeland (2014–present)
- Jeff Cate (2014–present)
- Georg Gäbel (2014–present)
- Hans Förster (2015–present)
- Amy M. Donaldson (2015–present)
- Amy Myshrall (2016–present)
- W. Andrew Smith (2017–present)
- Ekaterini Tsalampouni (2018–present)
- Greg Paulson (2018–present)
- Curt Niccum (2019–present)
