= Nestle (disambiguation) =

Nestlé is a Swiss company.

Nestle may also refer to:

== People ==
- Eberhard Nestle (1851–1913), German biblical scholar, father of Erwin Nestle
- Erwin Nestle (1883–1972), German biblical scholar, son of Eberhard Nestle
- Ingrid Nestle (born 1977), German politician
- Joan Nestle (born 1940), American writer, founder of the Lesbian Herstory Archives
- Henri Nestlé (1814–1890), born Heinrich Nestle, founder of the Nestlé company
- Marion Nestle (born 1936), American nutritional scientist

== Other uses ==
- Nestlé Canada Building, Toronto, Ontario
- Nestlé Tower, Croydon, U.K.
- A German company founded by Karl Nessler, the inventor of the permanent wave
- "Nestle", a song by Far from the album Water & Solutions
