= Lectionary 135 =

Lectionary ℓ 135
- New Testament manuscript
- Text: Evangelistarion
- Date: 8th century
- Script: Greek
- Now at: Vatican Library
- Size: 25.6 cm by 17.2 cm

Lectionary 135, designated by siglum ℓ 135 (in the Gregory-Aland numbering) is a Greek manuscript of the New Testament, on parchment leaves. Palaeographically it has been assigned to the 8th century.

== Description ==
The codex contains lessons from the Gospels lectionary (Evangelistarium), on 145 parchment leaves (25.6 cm by 17.2 cm), with some lacunae at the end. It is written in Greek uncial letters, in two columns per page, 23 lines per page, in large letters. It is a palimpsest. The upper text was added in the 12th century, it is the Lectionary 136.

== History ==
The manuscript was added to the list of New Testament manuscripts by Scholz. It was examined by Scholz, Tischendorf, Simcox, and Gregory. Constantin von Tischendorf gave its readings from Matthew 24:34-25:16; John 19:11-25.

The manuscript is not cited in the critical editions of the Greek New Testament (UBS3).

Currently the codex is located in the Vatican Library (Barberini gr. 472, fol. 1–118.139-165) in Rome.

== See also ==
- List of New Testament lectionaries
- Biblical manuscript
- Textual criticism
- Lectionary 134

== Bibliography ==
- J. M. A. Scholz, Biblisch-kritische Reise in Frankreich, der Schweiz, Italien, Palästine und im Archipel in den Jahren 1818, 1819, 1820, 1821: Nebst einer Geschichte des Textes des Neuen Testaments, p. 108.
- C. v. Tischendorf, Monumenta sacra inedita (Nova collectio) (Leipzig 1855), Vol. 1, pp. 199–210.
