= Editio Octava Critica Maior =

Critical edition of the Greek New Testament

Editio Octava Critica Maior is a critical edition of the Greek New Testament produced by Constantin von Tischendorf. It was Tischendorf's eighth edition of the Greek Testament, and the most important, published between 1864 and 1894.

== Edition ==
The first volume was issued in 11 parts, beginning in 1864. They were published in two volumes in 1869 and 1872. The edition was accompanied by a rich critical apparatus in which he assembled all of the variant readings that he or his predecessors had found in manuscripts, versions, and fathers.

Tischendorf died before he could finish his edition, and the third volume, containing the Prolegomena, was prepared and edited by C. R. Gregory and issued in three parts (1884, 1890, 1894).

Tischendorf gave the evidence known in his time. He used 64 uncial manuscripts, a single papyrus manuscript, and a small number of minuscule manuscripts. He could not verify everything he cited and sometimes in his apparatus he gives notations such as "cop^{ms} ap Mill et Wtst", i.e. "Coptic manuscript according to Mill and Westtstein". The manuscripts are cited completely and accurately. The number of inaccuracies is smaller than in 20th-century manual editions.

Tischendorf did not have a detailed textual theory. In practice he had a strong preference for the readings of the manuscript of his own discovery – Codex Sinaiticus. His text is eclectic but generally the Alexandrian. It has also something from the Western text-type, especially when it agrees with Codex Bezae.

At the beginning of his work Tischendorf had practically no access to Codex Vaticanus, and it was published too late to alter the basic structure of Tischendorf's edition.

== Influence ==
Tischendorf's Editio Octava and The New Testament in the Original Greek of Westcott and Hort were sufficient to make the Textus Receptus obsolete for the scholarly world.

According to Eberhard Nestle the text of the eighth edition differs from the seventh edition in 3,572 places. Nestle has accused this edition of giving weight to the evidence of Codex Sinaiticus. Nestle used Editio octava in his Novum Testamentum Graece for its extensive representation of the manuscript tradition and Westcott-Hort's text for its development of the methodology of the textual criticism. Nestle called Tischendorf's edition "the most complete survey of what has been done on the Greek New Testament up to the present time".

The edition was reprinted in 1965. According to Kurt Aland even a century later it was still of value for scholarly research.

Tischendorf proposed his own critical apparatus – symbols and abbreviations – in this work. The critical apparatus used in Editio Octava is still used by some textual critics.

== See also ==
- Editio Critica Maior

== Editio Octava ==
- Gospels: Novum Testamentum Graece: ad antiquissimos testes denuo recensuit, apparatum criticum omni studio perfectum, vol. I (1869)
- Acts–Revelation: Novum Testamentum Graece. Editio Octava Critica Maior, vol. II (1872)
- Prolegomena I–VI: Novum Testamentum Graece. Editio Octava Critica Maior, vol. III, Part 1 (1884)
- Prolegomena VII–VIII: Novum Testamentum Graece. Editio Octava Critica Maior, vol. III, Part 2 (1890)
- Prolegomena IX–XIII: Novum Testamentum Graece. Editio Octava Critica Maior, vol. III, Part 3 (1890)
