= Henry St. John Thackeray =

British biblical scholar (1869–1930)

Henry St. John Thackeray (1869–30 June 1930) was a British biblical scholar at King's College, Cambridge, an expert on Koine Greek, Josephus and the Septuagint.

== Life ==
He was the son of Francis St John Thackeray and nephew to the author William Makepeace Thackeray.

He was a scholar of King's College, University of Cambridge, who is perhaps best remembered for his work on Josephus, for his Grammar of Old Testament Greek and for his translation of Friedrich Blass' Grammar of New Testament Greek.

He also worked as the Grinfield Lecturer on the Septuagint at Oxford University.

His untimely death at the age of sixty-one in 1930 abruptly ended his work as editor and translator of Josephus's works for the Loeb Classical Library, after producing the first four volumes, and preparing part of the fifth, of a projected series of nine volumes. The work was then carried on by the American scholar, Ralph Marcus, and after him by Allen Wikgren and lastly Louis Feldman.

== Family ==
He was married to Lucy Elizabeth Orr; his sister-in-law was the astronomer and writer Mary Acworth Evershed.

He was the father of the astronomer A. David Thackeray.

His papers are held at Eton College.

== Selected works ==
- Thackeray, Henry St. John (1900). The Relation of St. Paul to Contemporary Jewish Thought. London: Macmillan.
- The Letter of Aristeas Introduction and Greek Text, as an appendix in Swete, Henry Barclay (1900). An Introduction to the Old Testament in Greek. Cambridge University Press.
- Thackeray, Henry St. John (1904). The Letter of Aristeas Translated into English. London: Macmillan & Co.
- Blass, Friedrich (1905). Grammar of New Testament Greek. Translated by Thackeray, Henry St. John. London: Macmillan & Co.
- Thackeray, Henry St. John (1909). A grammar of the Old Testament in Greek according to the Septuagint. Cambridge University Press.
- The Septuagint and Jewish Worship: A Study in Origins (1923)
- Josephus (1926). Josephus; with an English translation by H. St. J. Thackeray. Vol. 1 The Life. Against Apion. London: Heinemann.
- Josephus (1927). Josephus; with an English translation by H. St. J. Thackeray. Vol. 2 The Jewish War, Books I-III. London: Heinemann.
- Josephus (1928). Josephus; with an English translation by H. St. J. Thackeray. Vol. 3 The Jewish War, Books IV-VII. London: Heinemann.
- ——— (1929). Josephus: The Man and the Historian. New York: Jewish Institute of Religion Press.
- Josephus (1930). Josephus; with an English translation by H. St. J. Thackeray. Vol. 4 Jewish Antiquities, Books I-IV. London: Heinemann.
- Josephus (1934). Josephus; with an English translation by the late H. St. J. Thackeray and Ralph Marcus. Vol. 5 Jewish Antiquities, Books V-VIII. London: Heinemann.
