= Lectionary 23 =

Lectionary ℓ 23
- New Testament manuscript
- Text: Evangelistarion
- Date: 11th-century
- Script: Greek
- Now at: British Library
- Size: 28.1 cm by 21.5 cm

Lectionary 23, designated by siglum ℓ 23 (in the Gregory-Aland numbering). It is a Greek manuscript of the New Testament, on vellum leaves. Palaeographically it has been assigned to the 11th-century.

== Description ==
The codex contains lessons from the Gospels of John, Matthew, Luke lectionary (Evangelistarium), with numerous lacunae. It is written in Greek minuscule letters, on 230 parchment leaves (28.1 cm by 21.5 cm), 2 columns per page, 16 lines per page.

== History ==
The codex was added to the list of the New Testament manuscripts by Wettstein. It was merely described by Wettstein.

The manuscript is not cited in the critical editions of the Greek New Testament (UBS3), but it was used for the Editio Critica Maior.

Formerly the manuscript was held in France. Currently the codex is located in the British Library (Cotton. Vesp. B. 18) in London.

== See also ==
- List of New Testament lectionaries
- Biblical manuscript
- Textual criticism

== Bibliography ==
- Gregory, Caspar René (1900). Textkritik des Neuen Testaments. Vol. 1. Leipzig: J.C. Hinrichs. p. 389.
