= Eberhard Nestle =

German scholar

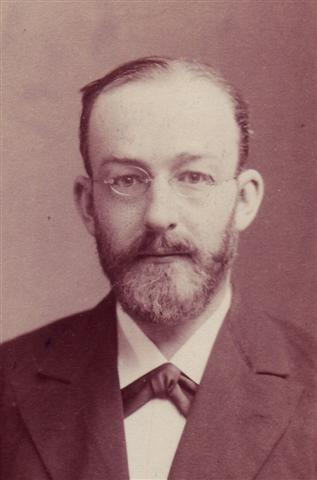
Eberhard Nestle

Eberhard Nestle (1 May 1851, Stuttgart – 9 March 1913, Stuttgart) was a German biblical scholar, textual critic, orientalist, editor of the Novum Testamentum Graece, and the father of Erwin Nestle.

== Life ==
Nestle was a son of the upper tribunal procurator (Obertribunalprokurator) Christian Gottlieb Nestle and his wife Sophie Beate Kleinmann. His half-brother from his father's second marriage was classical philologist Wilhelm Nestle.

Nestle studied at the Tübinger Stift from 1869 to 1874. His studies culminated in his doctoral thesis on the Hebrew and Greek text forms of the Book of Ezekiel. Afterwards he worked in the area of orientalism and wrote, among other things, a Syriac grammar. During his later years, his focus changed to textual criticism of the New Testament.

Between 1898 and 1912 he worked as professor at the Evangelical Seminaries of Maulbronn and Blaubeuren.

In 1880, he married Klara Kommerell (1852–87) in Tübingen; they had one son, Erwin Nestle. In 1887 his wife died after a short illness, and three years later, in 1890, Nestle married Elisabeth Aichele (1867–1944). In this second marriage, five daughters and one son were born.

In 1898 Nestle published a handbook of textual criticism, and in 1898 published the first edition of a Greek New Testament under the title Novum Testamentum Graece cum apparatu critico ex editionibus et libris manu scriptis collecto. The text of this Greek New Testament was later combined with the editions of Constantin von Tischendorf (Editio octava critica maior), The New Testament in the Original Greek of Westcott and Hort, and the edition of Richard Francis Weymouth. It was edited by the Württemberg Bible Society in Stuttgart. This edition eliminated the extremes of Tischendorf, such as partiality to Sinaiticus, and of Westcott and Hort, such as partiality to Vaticanus.

This edition was adopted by the British and Foreign Bible Society, replacing the Textus Receptus.

After the death of Eberhard Nestle his son Erwin Nestle (1883–1972) took over the publication and contributed substantially to a constant improvement of the editions. Since 1952 the edition occurred with the cooperation of Kurt Aland (21st edition). The theological standard work "Nestle-Aland" appeared from 1993 in the 27th edition.

== Works ==
- Psalterium tetraglottum graece, syriace, chaldaice et latine (1879);
- Syrische grammatik mit litteratur, chrestomathie und glossar (1888);
- Veteris Testamenti graeci codices Vaticanus et Sinaiticus cum texto recepto collati, 1880, 2. Aufl. (1887);
- Marginalien und Materialen (1893)
- A Palestinian Syriac Lectionary containing lessons from the Pentateuch, Job, Proverbs, Prophets, Acts, and Epistles (1897);
- Vom Textus Receptus des griechischen neuen Testaments: Ein erweiterter Vortrag (1903)
- Einführung in das griechische Neue Testament, 3. Aufl. (Göttingen: 1909).
