= Claremont Profile Method =

Method for classifying ancient manuscripts of the Bible

The Claremont Profile Method is a method for classifying ancient manuscripts of the Bible. It was elaborated by Ernest Cadman Colwell and his students. Professor Frederik Wisse attempted to establish an accurate and rapid procedure for the classification of the manuscript evidence of any ancient text with large manuscript attestation, and to present an adequate basis for the selection of balanced representatives of the whole tradition. The work of Wisse is limited only to three chapters in Luke: 1, 10, and 20.

== Wisse's profiles ==
The word before the bracket is the reading of the UBS edition. The profile of a manuscript is formed by noting the numbers of those test readings where the manuscript agrees with the bold reading. The readings which are not bold are those of the Textus Receptus.

=== Luke 1 ===
- Luke 1:2 (1 reading) — παρεδοσαν ] παρεδωκαν
- Luke 1:7 (2 reading) — ην η ελισαβετ ] η ελισαβετ ην
- Luke 1:7 (3 reading) — η ] omit
- Luke 1:8 (4 reading) — εναντι ] εναντιον
- Luke 1:9 (5 reading) — κυριου ] θεου
- Luke 1:10 (6 reading) — ην του λαου ] του λαου ην
- Luke 1:14 (7 reading) — επι ] εν
- Luke 1:14 (8 reading) — γενεσει ] γεννεσει
- Luke 1:15 (9 reading) — του ] omit
- Luke 1:15 (10 reading) — κυριου ] θεου
- Luke 1:16 (11 reading) — επι ] προς
- Luke 1:17 (12 reading) — ετοιμασαι ] + τω
- Luke 1:21 (13 reading) — εθαυμαζον ] εθαυμαζεν
- Luke 1:22 (14 reading) — εδυνατο ] ηδυνατο
- Luke 1:22 (15 reading) — αυτοις ] omit
- Luke 1:22 (16 reading) — διεμενε(ν) ] διεμεινε
- Luke 1:23 (17 reading) — επλησθησαν ] επληρωθησαν
- Luke 1:24 (18 reading) — ταυτας τας ημερας ] τας ημερας ταυτας
- Luke 1:25 (19 reading) — επειδεν ] εφειδεν
- Luke 1:26 (20 reading) — απο ] υπο
- Luke 1:26 (21 reading) — του ] omit
- Luke 1:26 (22 reading) — Ναζαρεθ ] Ναζαρετ
- Luke 1:27 (23 reading) — οικου ] οικου και πατριας
- Luke 1:29 (24 reading) — δε ] δε ιδουσα
- Luke 1:29 (25 reading) — επι τω λογω διεταραχθη ] διεταραχθη επι τω λογω
- Luke 1:29 (26 reading) — τω λογω ] τω λογω αυτου
- Luke 1:30 (27 reading) — ο αγγελος αυτη ] αυτη ο αγγελος
- Luke 1:34 (28 reading) — εσται ] εσται μοι
- Luke 1:35 (29 reading) — γεννωμενον ] γεννωμενον εκ σου
- Luke 1:39 (30 reading) — αναστασα δε ] και αναστασα
- Luke 1:39 (31 reading) — δε ] omit
- Luke 1:41 (32 reading) — τον ασπασμον της μαριας η ελισαβετ ] η ελισαβετ τον ασπασμον της μαριας
- Luke 1:42 (33 reading) — ανεφωνησε(ν) ] ανεβοησε(ν)
- Luke 1:44 (34 reading) — εν αγαλλιασει το βρεφος ] το βρεφος εν αγαλλιασει
- Luke 1:45 (35 reading) — εσται ] εσται η
- Luke 1:50 (36 reading) — γενεας και γενεας ] γενεαν και γενεαν TR reads: γενεας γενεων
- Luke 1:55 (37 reading) — εις τον αιωνα ] εως αιωνος
- Luke 1:57 (38 reading) — τη ] της
- Luke 1:59 (39 reading) — ημερα τη ογδοη ] ογδοη ημερα
- Luke 1:61 (40 reading) — οτι ] omit
- Luke 1:61 (41 reading) — εκ της συγγενειας ] εν τη συγγενεια
- Luke 1:62 (42 reading) — αυτο ] αυτον
- Luke 1:63 (43 reading) — εστι(ν) ] εσται
- Luke 1:65 (44 reading) — και εγενετο ] εγενετο δε
- Luke 1:65 (45 reading) — παντα ] omit
- Luke 1:66 (46 reading) — αυτου ] αυτων
- Luke 1:67 (47 reading) — επροφητευσε(ν) ] προφητευσε
- Luke 1:69 (48 reading) — εν ] εν τω
- Luke 1:70 (49 reading) — αγιων ] αγιων των
- Luke 1:74 (50 reading) — χειρος ] χειρος των
- Luke 1:74 (51 reading) — εχθρων ] εχθρων ηνων
- Luke 1:75 (52 reading) — ημεραις ] ημεραις της ζωης
- Luke 1:77 (53 reading) — αυτων ] ημων
- Luke 1:80 (54 reading) — ισραηλ ] λαον

=== Luke 10 ===
- Luke 10:1 (1 reading) — δυο δυο ] δυο
- Luke 10:1 (2 reading) — αυτου ] εαυτου
- Luke 10:1 (3 reading) — ημελλεν ] εμελλεν
- Luke 10:1 (4 reading) — ερχεσθαι ] διερχεσθαι
- Luke 10:1 (5 reading) — ] εισερχεσθαι
- Luke 10:2 (6 reading) — ελεγεν ] ειπεν
- Luke 10:2 (7 reading) — δε^{1} ] ουν
- Luke 10:2 (8 reading) — οπως ] οπως αν
- Luke 10:3 (9 reading) — αρνας ] προβατα
- Luke 10:4 (10 reading) — μη^{2} ] μητε
- Luke 10:4 (11 reading) — μη^{3} ] μηδε
- Luke 10:4 (12 reading) — ] μητε
- Luke 10:5 (13 reading) — εισελθητε ] εισερχησθε
- Luke 10:5 (14 reading) — ειρηνη ] ειρηνη εν
- Luke 10:6 (15 reading) — εαν ] εαν μεν
- Luke 10:6 (16 reading) — εφ ] προς
- Luke 10:7 (17 reading) — οικιας ] οικιαν
- Luke 10:8 (18 reading) — ην ] ην δ'
- Luke 10:8 (19 reading) — εισερχησθε ] εισερχεσθε
- Luke 10:10 (20 reading) — εισελθητε ] εισερχησθε
- Luke 10:11 (21 reading) — ημιν ] υμιν
- Luke 10:11 (22 reading) — εις τους ποδας ] omit
- Luke 10:12 (23 reading) — λεγω ] λεγω δε
- Luke 10:12 (24 reading) — εν τη ημερα εκεινη ανεκτοτερον εσται ] ανεκτοτερον εσται εν τη ημερα εκεινη
- Luke 10:13 (25 reading) — Βηθσαιδα ] Βηθσαιδαν
- Luke 10:13 (26 reading) — εγενηθησαν ] εγενοντο
- Luke 10:14 (27 reading) — ανεκτοτερον εσται εν τη κρισει ] εν τη κρισει ανεκτοτερον εσται
- Luke 10:14 (28 reading) — εν τη κρισει ] (εν) ημερα κρισεως
- Luke 10:15 (29 reading) — υψωθειση ] υψωθεισα
- Luke 10:16 (30 reading) — ακουων υμων ] υμων ακουων
- Luke 10:16 (31 reading) — με ] με και ο ακουων εμου ακουει του αποστειλαντος με
- Luke 10:17 (32 reading) — οι εβδομηκοντα μετα χαρας ] μετα χαρας οι εβδομηκοντα
- Luke 10:17 (33 reading) — εβδομηκοντα ] εβδομηκοντα μαθηται
- Luke 10:17 (34 reading) — υποτασσεται ημιν ] ημιν υποτασσεται
- Luke 10:21 (35 reading) — αυτη ] αυτη δε
- Luke 10:21 (36 reading) — τω πνευματι τω αγιω ] ο Ιησους τω πνευματι; TR reads τω πνευματι ο Ιησους
- Luke 10:22 (37 reading) — παντα ] και στραφεις προς τους μαθητας ειπε παντα
- Luke 10:22 (38 reading) — παρεδοθε ] παρα δεδοται
- Luke 10:22 (39 reading) — τις εστιν ο υιος ει μη ο πατηρ ] omit
- Luke 10:23 (40 reading) — ειπε(ν) ] ειπεν αυτοις
- Luke 10:24 (41 reading) — γαρ ] δε
- Luke 10:26 (42 reading) — δε ] δε Ιησους
- Luke 10:28 (43 reading) — αυτω ] αυτω Ιησους
- Luke 10:30 (44 reading) — εκδυσαντες ] εξεδυσαν
- Luke 10:30 (45 reading) — ημιθανη ] ημιθανη τυγχανοντα
- Luke 10:32 (46 reading) — γενομενος ] omit
- Luke 10:32 (47 reading) — ελθων ] omit
- Luke 10:32 (48 reading) — ιδων ] ιδων αυτον
- Luke 10:33 (49 reading) — ιδων ] ιδων αυτον
- Luke 10:34 (50 reading) — αυτον^{2} ] omit
- Luke 10:35 (51 reading) — αυριον ] αυριον εξελθον
- Luke 10:35 (52 reading) — ειπεν ] ειπεν αυτω
- Luke 10:35 (53 reading) — τι ] τι δ'
- Luke 10:35 (54 reading) — εγω ] omit
- Luke 10:35 (55 reading) — με ] μοι
- Luke 10:36 (56 reading) — τις ] τις ουν
- Luke 10:36 (57 reading) — πλησιον δοκει σοι ] δοκει σοι πλησιον
- Luke 10:37 (58 reading) — δε ] ουν
- Luke 10:38 (59 reading) — αυτους ] αυτον
- Luke 10:39 (60 reading) — τον λογον ] των λογων
- Luke 10:39 (61 reading) — ] τους λογους
- Luke 10:40 (62 reading) — μελει ] μελλει
- Luke 10:41 (63 reading) — ειπεν αυτη ο κυριος (or Ιησους) ] ο κυριος ειπεν αυτη
- Luke 10:42 (64 reading) — γαρ ] δε

=== Luke 20 ===
- Luke 20:1 (1 reading) — ημερων ] ημερων εκεινων
- Luke 20:1 (2 reading) — εν τω ιερω ] omit
- Luke 20:1 (3 reading) — αρχιερεις και οι γραμματεις ] γραμματεις και οι αρχιερεις
- Luke 20:1 (4 reading) — αρχιερεις ] ιερεις
- Luke 20:2 (5 reading) — και ειπαν ] οmit (TR reads: και ειπον)
- Luke 20:2 (6 reading) — λεγοντες προς αυτον ] προς αυτον λεγοντες
- Luke 20:2 (7 reading) — ειπον ] ειπε
- Luke 20:3 (8 reading) — υμας καγω ] καγω υμας
- Luke 20:3 (9 reading) — ενα λογον (=TR) ] λογον ενα
- Luke 20:3 (10 reading) — ενα ] omit (= UBS edition)
- Luke 20:5 (11 reading) — συνελογισαντο ] διελογισαντο
- Luke 20:5 (12 reading) — οτι ] omit
- Luke 20:5 (13 reading) — δια τι ] δια τι ουν
- Luke 20:6 (14 reading) — ο λαος απας ] πας ο λαος
- Luke 20:6 (15 reading) — ειναι ] γεγονεναι
- Luke 20:7 (16 reading) — ειδεναι ] ειδεναι το
- Luke 20:7 (17 reading) — ποθεν ] omit
- Luke 20:8 (18 reading) — και ο ] ο δε
- Luke 20:9 (19 reading) — τις ] omit
- Luke 20:10 (20 reading) — και ] και τω
- Luke 20:10 (21 reading) — ] εν τω (TR reads: και εν)
- Luke 20:10 (22 reading) — απο του καρπου του αμπελωνος δωσουσιν (TR reads: δωσιν) αυτω ] λαβε απο του καρπου του αμπελωνος
- Luke 20:10 (23 reading) — εξαπεστειλαν ] απεστειλαν
- Luke 20:12 (24 reading) — και τουτον ] κακεινον
- Luke 20:13 (25 reading) — τουτον ] τουτον ιδοντες
- Luke 20:14 (26 reading) — διελογιζοντο ] διελογισαντο
- Luke 20:14 (27 reading) — αλληλους ] εαυτους
- Luke 20:14 (28 reading) — κληρονομος ] κληρονομος δευτε
- Luke 20:14 (29 reading) — ινα ημων γενηται (or εσται) ] και ημων εστι (or εσται)
- Luke 20:15 (30 reading) — αυτον ] οmit
- Luke 20:16 (31 reading) — τουτος ] εκεινους
- Luke 20:18 (32 reading) — επ ] εις
- Luke 20:19 (33 reading) — γραμματεις και οι αρχιερεις ] αρχιερεις και οι γραμματεις
- Luke 20:19 (34 reading) — τας χειρας ] την χειρα
- Luke 20:19 (35 reading) — τον λαον ] omit
- Luke 20:19 (36 reading) — τον λαον ] οχλον
- Luke 20:19 (37 reading) — ειπε(ν) την παραβολην ταυτην ] την παραβολην ταυτην ειπε(ν)
- Luke 20:22 (38 reading) — ημας ] ημιν
- Luke 20:22 (39 reading) — φορον ] φορους
- Luke 20:22 (40 reading) — δουναι ] διδονται
- Luke 20:23 (41 reading) — αυτους ] αυτους τι μη πειραζετε
- Luke 20:24 (42 reading) — δειξατε ] επιδειξατε
- Luke 20:24 (43 reading) — δηναριον ] δηναριον οι δε εδειξαν και ειπε
- Luke 20:25 (44 reading) — δε ] omit
- Luke 20:25 (45 reading) — προς αυτους ] αυτοις
- Luke 20:25 (46 reading) — τοινυν αποδοτε ] αποδοτε τοινυν
- Luke 20:25 (47 reading) — Καισαρος ] Καισαρος τω
- Luke 20:27 (48 reading) — αντιλεγοντες ] λεγοντες
- Luke 20:27 (49 reading) — επηρωτεσαν ] επηρωτουν
- Luke 20:28 (50 reading) — Μωυσης ] Μωσης
- Luke 20:28 (51 reading) — η ] αποθανη
- Luke 20:28 (52 reading) — λαβη ο αδελφος αυτου ] ο αδελφος αυτου λαβη
- Luke 20:29 (53 reading) — ησαν ] ησαν παρ ημιν
- Luke 20:31 (54 reading) — ωσαυτως ] ωσαυτως ως αυτως
- Luke 20:31 (55 reading) — επτα ] επτα και
- Luke 20:31 (56 reading) — και απεθανον ] omit
- Luke 20:32 (57 reading) — υστερον ] υστερον παντων
- Luke 20:32 (58 reading) — ] + δε (TR reads: υστερον δε παντων)
- Luke 20:33 (59 reading) — ουν εν τη αναστασει ] εν τη αναστασει ουν (TR reads: εν τη ουν αναστασει)
- Luke 20:33 (60 reading) — γινεται ] εσται
- Luke 20:34 (61 reading) — γαμισκονται ] εκγαμιζονται (TR reads: εκγαμισκονται)
- Luke 20:35 (62 reading) — γαμιζονται ] εκγαμιζονται (TR reads: εκγαμισκονται)
- Luke 20:36 (63 reading) — ετι ] omit
- Luke 20:36 (64 reading) — εισι(ν) ] omit
- Luke 20:37 (65 reading) — Μωυσης ] Μωσης
- Luke 20:37 (66 reading) — εμηνυσεν ] εμνημονευσεν
- Luke 20:39 (67 reading) — ειπας ] λεγεις
- Luke 20:40 (68 reading) — επερωταν ] επερωτησαι
- Luke 20:40 (69 reading) — ουδεν ] ουδε εν
- Luke 20:41 (70 reading) — λεγουσι(ν) ] λεγουσι(ν) τινες
- Luke 20:41 (71 reading) — και Χριστον ειναι Δαυιδ υιον ] οι γραμματεις οτι ο Χριστος υιος δαυιδ εστιν (TR reads: τον Χριστον υιον Δαυιδ ειναι)
- Luke 20:42 (72 reading) — αυτος γαρ ] και αυτος
- Luke 20:42 (73 reading) — βιβλω ] βιβλω των
- Luke 20:44 (74 reading) — κυριον αυτον ] αυτον κυριον
- Luke 20:44 (75 reading) — αυτου υιος ] υιος αυτου
- Luke 20:46 (76 reading) — περιπατειν εν στολαις ] εν στολαις περιπατειν
- Luke 20:47 (77 reading) — κατεσθιουσι ] κατεσθιοντες
- Luke 20:47 (78 reading) — προσευχονται ] προσευχομενοι.

== See also ==
- Textual criticism
