= Ralph Marcus =

American classical philologist (1900–1956)

Ralph Marcus (August 17, 1900 – December 25, 1956) was an American classical philologist and historian of Hellenistic Judaism and the Second Temple period. He is most known for his Loeb Classical Library translations of works of the Jewish authors Josephus and Philo of Alexandria from Koine Greek and Classical Armenian into English.

== Biography ==
Ralph Marcus was born on August 17, 1900, in San Francisco. His father was Moses Marcus, a Talmudic scholar, and his mother was Selma Marcus, née Neufeld. After the 1906 San Francisco earthquake, his family moved to New York. Marcus studied at Columbia University and received his BA, Masters, and PhD there. He finished his doctorate in 1927, with his dissertation being "Law in the Apocrypha". In addition to his studies at Columbia, Marcus also worked and studied with Harry Austryn Wolfson at Harvard from 1925–1927, one of the premier scholars of Hellenic Judaism and Philo of Alexandria of the era.

After attaining his doctorate, he acquired a teaching position at Hebrew Union College – Jewish Institute of Religion, a seminary of Reform Judaism in New York. He would teach there from 1927–1943, and acquired a professorship in philology in 1935. He also worked as a lecturer at Columbia, his alma mater. In 1943, he left New York for Chicago and joined the Oriental Institute of the University of Chicago as an associate professor of Hellenistic culture. He became a full professor there in 1950. In the academic year 1954/55, he served as a visiting professor at Johann Wolfgang Goethe University in Frankfurt.

Marcus died of a heart attack on December 25, 1956, in Chicago.

== Work ==
Marcus's most notable achievements were landmark translations for the Loeb Classical Library of the works of Philo of Alexandria and Flavius Josephus. The first five volumes of Josephus's Jewish Antiquities had been translated for Loeb by Henry St. John Thackeray in the 1920s, but Thackeray died in 1930. Marcus was called upon to complete the sixth volume, as well as perform further Loeb translations of volumes 7–17. (Allen Wikgren finished 16–17 that Marcus had started before his death, and Louis H. Feldman would translate volumes 18–20 of the mammoth work.) For Philo, Marcus translated "Questions and Answers on Genesis and Exodus" despite much of the work only existing in an Armenian language translation; his attempts at reconstructing the original Greek from the Armenian were lauded.

Toward the end of his life, Marcus contributed to academic study of the Dead Sea Scrolls, a cache of scriptures of the Essenes found in the late 1940s that greatly expanded knowledge of Hellenistic and Roman era Judaism.

Marcus served as an associate editor of the Journal of Biblical Literature and various other journals during his career.
