= Constantin von Tischendorf =

German theologian and biblical scholar (1815–1874)

Doctor Constantin von Tischendorf
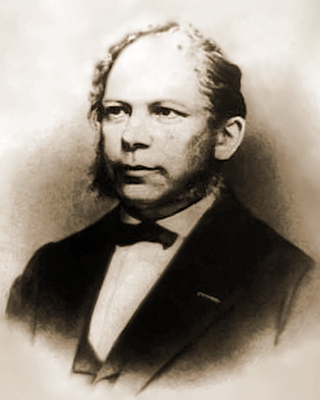
- Constantin von Tischendorf, around 1870
- Born: Lobegott Friedrich Constantin (von) Tischendorf; 18 January 1815; Lengenfeld, Kingdom of Saxony
- Died: 7 December 1874 (aged 59); Leipzig, Saxony, German Empire

Academic work
- Discipline: theology

Lobegott Friedrich Constantin (von) Tischendorf (18 January 1815 – 7 December 1874) was a German biblical scholar. In 1844, he discovered the world's oldest and most complete Bible dated to around the mid-4th century and called Codex Sinaiticus after Saint Catherine's Monastery at Mount Sinai.

Tischendorf was made an honorary doctor by the University of Oxford on 16 March 1865, and by the University of Cambridge on 9 March 1865 following his discovery. While a student gaining his academic degree in the 1840s, he earned international recognition when he deciphered the Codex Ephraemi Rescriptus, a 5th-century Greek manuscript of the New Testament.

== Early life and education ==
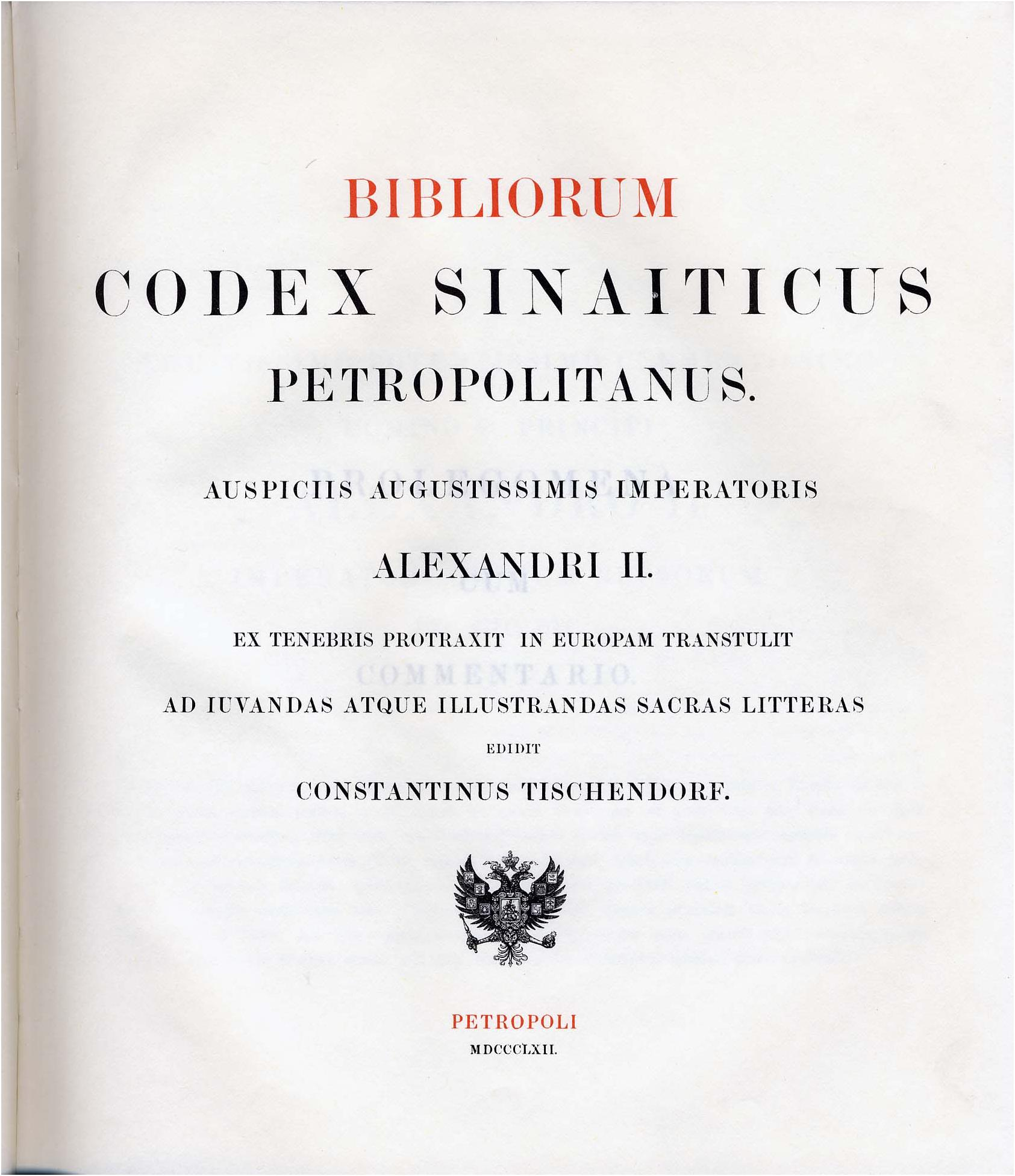
Title page from Tischendorf's facsimile edition of the Codex Sinaiticus, published in 1862

Tischendorf was born in Lengenfeld, Saxony, the son of a forensic physician. After attending primary school in Lengenfeld, he went to grammar school in nearby Plauen. From Easter 1834, having achieved excellent marks at school, he studied theology and philosophy at the University of Leipzig.

At Leipzig he was mainly influenced by JGB Winer, and he began to take special interest in New Testament criticism. Winer's influence gave him the desire to use the oldest manuscripts in order to compile the text of the New Testament as close to the original as possible. Despite his father's death in 1835 and his mother's just a year later, he was still able to achieve his doctorate in 1838, before accepting a tutoring job in the home of Reverend Ferdinand Leberecht Zehme in Grossstadeln where he met and fell in love with the clergyman's daughter Angelika. He published a volume of poetry in 1838, Maiknospen (Buds of May) and Der junge Mystiker (The Young Mystic) was published under a pseudonym in 1839. At this time he also began his first critical edition of the New Testament in Greek which was to become his life's work.

After a journey through southern Germany and Switzerland, and a visit to Strassburg, he returned to Leipzig to begin work on a critical study of the New Testament text.

== Career ==
In 1840, he qualified as university lecturer in theology with a dissertation on the recensions of the New Testament text, the main part of which reappeared the following year in the prolegomena to his first edition of the Greek New Testament. These early textual studies convinced him of the absolute necessity of new and more exact collations of manuscripts.

From October 1840 until January 1843 he was in Paris, busy with the treasures of the Bibliothèque Nationale, eking out his scanty means by making collations for other scholars, and producing for the publisher, Firmin Didot, several editions of the Greek New Testament, one of them exhibiting the form of the text corresponding most closely to the Vulgate. His second edition retracted the more precarious readings of the first, and included a statement of critical principles that is a landmark for evolving critical studies of Biblical texts.

In 1845 before he left paris, decipherment of the palimpsest Codex Ephraemi Syri Rescriptus and the Old Testament were completed. His success in dealing with a manuscript that, having been over-written with other works of Ephrem the Syrian, had been mostly illegible to earlier collators, made him more well known, and gained support for more extended critical expeditions. He now became professor extraordinarius at Leipzig, where he was married in 1845. He also began to publish Reise in den Orient, an account of his travels in the east (in 2 volumes, 1845–46, translated as Travels in the East in 1847). Even though he was an expert in reading the text of a palimpsest (this is a document where the original writing has been removed and new writing added), he was not able to identify the value or meaning of the Archimedes Palimpsest, a torn leaf of which he held and after his death was sold to the Cambridge University Library.

Tischendorf briefly visited the Netherlands in 1841 and England in 1842. In 1843 he visited Italy for thirteen months, before continuing on to Egypt, Sinai, and the Levant, returning via Vienna and Munich.

=== Discovery of the Codex Sinaiticus Bible manuscripts ===
In 1844 Tischendorf travelled the first time to Saint Catherine's Monastery at the foot of Mount Sinai in Egypt, where he found a portion of what would later be hailed as the oldest complete known New Testament.

Of the many pages which were contained in an old wicker basket (the kind that the monastery hauled in its visitors as customary in unsafe territories) he was given 43 pages containing a part of the Old Testament as a present. He donated those 43 pages to King Frederick Augustus II of Saxony (reigned 1836–1854), to honour him and to recognise his patronage as the funder of Tischendorf's journey. (Tischendorf held a position as Theological Professor at Leipzig University, also under the patronage of Frederick Augustus II.) Leipzig University put two of the leaves on display in 2011.

Tischendorf reported in his 1865 book Wann Wurden Unsere Evangelen Verfasst, translated to English in 1866 as When Were Our Gospels Written in the section "The Discovery of the Sinaitic Manuscript" that he found, in a trash basket, forty-three sheets of parchment of an ancient copy of the Greek Old Testament, reporting that the monks were using the trash to start fires. And Tischendorf, horrified, asked if he could have them. He deposited them at the University of Leipzig, under the title of the Codex Friderico-Augustanus, a name given in honour of his patron, Frederick Augustus II of Saxony, king of Saxony. The fragments were published in 1846, although Tischendorf kept the place of discovery a secret.

Many have expressed skepticism at the historical accuracy of this report of saving a 1500-year-old parchment from the flames. J. Rendel Harris referred to the story as a myth. The Tischendorf Lesebuch (see References) quotes that the Librarian Kyrillos mentioned to Tischendorf that the contents of the basket had already twice been submitted to the fire. The contents of the baskets were damaged scriptures, the third filling apparently, so cited by Tischendorf himself.[see Tischendorf Lesebuch, Tischendorf's own account]. In 1853 Tischendorf made a second trip to the Syrian monastery but made no new discoveries. He returned a third time in January 1859 under the patronage of Tsar Alexander II of Russia with the active aid of the Russian government to find more of the Codex Frederico-Augustanus or similar ancient Biblical texts. On 4 February, the last day of his visit, he was shown a text which he recognized as significant – the Codex Sinaiticus – a Greek manuscript of the complete New Testament and parts of the Old Testament dating to the 4th century.

Tischendorf persuaded the monks to present the manuscript to Tsar Alexander II of Russia, at the cost of the Tsar it was published in 1862 (in four folio volumes). Those ignorant of the details of his discovery of the Codex Sinaiticus accused Tischendorf of buying manuscripts from ignorant monastery librarians at low prices. Indeed, he was never rich, but he staunchly defended the rights of the monks at Saint Catherine's Monastery when he persuaded them eventually to send the manuscript to the Tsar. This took approximately 10 years because the abbot of St Catherines had to be re-elected and confirmed in office in Cairo and in Jerusalem, and during those 10 years no one in the monastery had the authority to hand over any documents. However the documents were handed over in due course following a signed and sealed letter to the Tsar Alexander II (Schenkungsurkunde). Even so, the monks of Mt. Sinai still display a receipt-letter from Tischendorf promising to return the manuscript to them in the case that the donation can not be done. This token-letter had to be destroyed, following the late issue of a "Schenkungsurkunde". This donation act regulated the Codex exchange with the Tsar, against 9000 Rubels and Rumanian estate protection. The Tsar was seen as the protector of Greek-Orthodox Christians. Thought lost since the Russian revolution, the document (Schenkungsurkunde) has now resurfaced in St Petersburg 2003, and has also been long before commented upon by other scholars like Kurt Aland. The monastery has disputed the existence of the gift certificate (Schenkungsurkunde) since the British Library was named as the new owner of the Codex. Now following the late find of the gift certificate by the National Russian Library the existence cannot be disputed in earnest.

In 1869 the Tsar awarded Tischendorf the style of "von" Tischendorf as a Russian noble. 327 facsimile editions of the Codex were printed in Leipzig for the Tsar (instead of a salary for the three-year work of Tischendorf the Tsar gave him 100 copies for reselling) in order to celebrate the 1000th anniversary of the traditional foundation of the Rus' state in 862 with the publication of this most amazing find. Supporting the production of the facsimile, all made with special print characters for each of the 4 scribes of the Codex Sinaiticus, was shift work and contributed to Tischendorf's early demise due to exhausting work for months also during nights. Thus the Codex found its way to the Imperial Library at St. Petersburg.

When the 4-volume luxury edition of the Sinai Bible was completed in 1862, C. Tischendorf presented the original ancient manuscript to Emperor Alexander II. Meanwhile, the question of transferring the manuscript to the full possession of the Russian Sovereign remained unresolved for some years. In 1869, the new Archbishop of Sinai, Callistratus, and the monastic community, signed the official certificate presenting the manuscript to the Tsar. The Russian Government, in turn, bestowed the Monastery with 9000 rubles and decorated the Archbishop and some of the brethren with orders. In 1933 the Soviet Government sold the Codex Sinaiticus for 100,000 pounds to the British Museum in London, England. The official certificate with signatures in Russian/ French/ Greek sections has been refound in St Petersburg.

=== Novum Testamentum Graece – publication with 21 editions ===
In the winter of 1849 the first edition of his great work now titled Novum Testamentum Graece. Ad antiquos testes recensuit. Apparatum criticum multis modis appeared (translated as Greek New Testament. The ancient witnesses reviewed. Preparations critical in many ways), containing canons of criticism, adding examples of their application that are applicable to students today:

Basic rule: "The text is only to be sought from ancient evidence, and especially from Greek manuscripts, but without neglecting the testimonies of versions and fathers."

1. "A reading altogether peculiar to one or another ancient document is suspicious; as also is any, even if supported by a class of documents, which seems to evince that it has originated in the revision of a learned man."
2. "Readings, however well supported by evidence, are to be rejected, when it is manifest (or very probable) that they have proceeded from the errors of copyists."
3. "In parallel passages, whether of the New or Old Testament, especially in the Synoptic Gospels, which ancient copyists continually brought into increased accordance, those testimonies are preferable, in which precise accordance of such parallel passages is not found; unless, indeed, there are important reasons to the contrary."
4. "In discrepant readings, that should be preferred which may have given occasion to the rest, or which appears to comprise the elements of the others."
5. "Those readings must be maintained which accord with New Testament Greek, or with the particular style of each individual writer."

These were partly the result of the tireless travels he had begun in 1839 in search of unread manuscripts of the New Testament, "to clear up in this way," he wrote, "the history of the sacred text, and to recover if possible the genuine apostolic text which is the foundation of our faith."

In 1850 appeared his edition of the Codex Amiatinus (in 1854 corrected) and of the Septuagint version of the Old Testament (7th edition, 1887); in 1852, amongst other works, his edition of the Codex Claromontanus. In 1859, he was named professor ordinarius of theology and of Biblical paleography, this latter professorship being specially created for him; and another book of travel, Aus dem heiligen Lande, appeared in 1862. Tischendorf's Eastern journeys were rich enough in other discoveries to merit the highest praise.

Besides his fame as a scholar, he was a friend of both Robert Schumann, with whom he corresponded, and Felix Mendelssohn, who dedicated a song to him. His colleague Samuel Prideaux Tregelles wrote warmly of their mutual interest in textual scholarship. His personal library, purchased after his death, eventually came to the University of Glasgow, where a commemorative exhibition of books from his library was held in 1974 and can be accessed by the public.

== Death ==
Lobegott Friedrich Constantin (von) Tischendorf died in Leipzig on 7 December 1874, aged 59.

== Codex Sinaiticus ==
The Codex Sinaiticus contains a 4th-century manuscript of New Testament texts. Two other Bibles of similar age exist, though they are less complete: Codex Vaticanus in the Vatican Library and Codex Alexandrinus, currently owned by the British Library. The Codex Sinaiticus is deemed by some to be the most important surviving New Testament manuscript, as no older manuscript is as nearly complete as the Codex. The codex can be viewed in the British Library in London, or as a digitized version on the Internet.

== Tischendorf's motivation ==
Throughout his life, Tischendorf sought old biblical manuscripts, as he saw it as his task to give theology a Greek New Testament that was based on the oldest possible manuscripts. He intended to be as close as possible to the sources. Tischendorf's greatest discovery was in the monastery of Saint Catherine on the Sinai Peninsula, which he visited in May 1844, and again in 1853 and 1859 (as Russian envoy).

In 1862, Tischendorf published the text of the Codex Sinaiticus for the 1000th Anniversary of the Russian Monarchy in both an illustrious four-volume facsimile edition and a less costly text edition, the latter to enable as many scholars as possible to have access to the contents of the Codex.

Tischendorf pursued a constant course of editorial labors, mainly on the New Testament, until he was broken down by overwork in 1873. Prof. Christfried Boettrich (Leipzig University, Prof. of Theology) explained in a publication on Tischendorf's Letter that he was motivated to prove scientifically that the words of the Bible were trustworthily transmitted over the centuries.

== Works ==
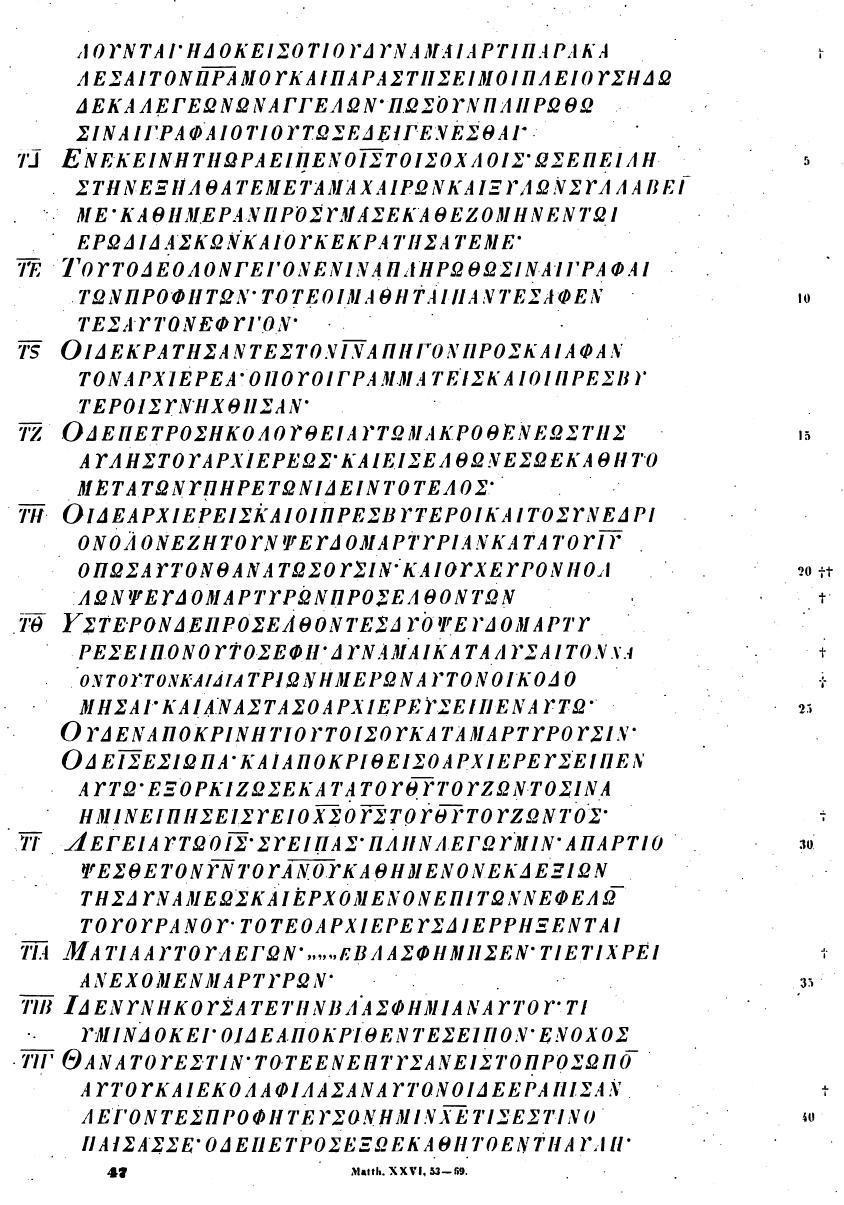
Matthew 26:52–69 in Tischendorf's facsimile edition (1843)

His magnum opus was the "Critical Edition of the New Testament."

The great edition, of which the text and apparatus appeared in 1869 and 1872, was called by himself editio viii; but this number is raised to twenty or twenty-one, if mere reprints from stereotype plates and the minor editions of his great critical texts are included; posthumous prints bring the total to forty-one. Four main recensions of Tischendorf's text may be distinguished, dating respectively from his editions of 1841, 1849, 1859 (ed. vii), and 1869–72 (ed. viii). The edition of 1849 may be regarded as historically the most important, from the mass of new critical material it used; that of 1859 is distinguished from Tischendorf's other editions by coming nearer to the received text; in the eighth edition, the testimony of the Sinaitic manuscript received great weight. The readings of the Vatican manuscript were given with more exactness and certainty than had been possible in the earlier editions, and the editor had also the advantage of using the published labours of his colleague and friend Samuel Prideaux Tregelles.

Of relatively lesser importance was Tischendorf's work on the Greek Old Testament. His edition of the Roman text, with the variants of the Alexandrian manuscript, the Codex Ephraemi, and the Friderico-Augustanus, was of service when it appeared in 1850, but, being stereotyped, was not greatly improved in subsequent issues. Its imperfections, even within the limited field it covers, may be judged by the aid of Eberhard Nestle's appendix to the 6th issue (1880).

Besides this may be mentioned editions of the New Testament apocrypha, De Evangeliorum apocryphorum origine et usu (1851); Acta Apostolorum apocrypha (1851); Evangelia apocrypha (1853; 2nd edition, 1876); Apocalypses apocryphae (1866), and various minor writings, partly of an apologetic character, such as Wann wurden unsere Evangelien verfasst? (When Were Our Gospels Written?; 1865; 4th edition, 1866, digitized by Google and available for e-readers), Haben wir den echten Schrifttext der Evangelisten und Apostel? (1873), and Synopsis evangelica (7th edition, 1898).

=== Facsimile of manuscripts ===
- Codex Ephraemi Syri rescriptus, sive Fragmenta Novi Testamenti, Lipsiae 1843
- Codex Ephraemi Syri rescriptus, sive Fragmenta Veteris Testamenti, Lipsiae 1845
- Notitia editionis codicis Bibliorum Sinaitici (Leipzig 1860)
- Anecdota sacra et profana (Leipzig 1861)

=== Editions of Novum Testamentum Graece ===
- Novum Testamentum Graece. Editio stereotypa secunda, (Lipsiae 1862)
- Novum Testamentum Graece. Editio Quinta, Lipsiae 1878
- Novum Testamentum Graece. Editio Septima, Lipsiae 1859

=== Editio Octava ===
- Gospels: Novum Testamentum Graece: ad antiquissimos testes denuo recensuit, apparatum criticum omni studio perfectum, vol. I (1869)
- Acts–Revelation: Novum Testamentum Graece. Editio Octava Critica Maior, vol. II (1872)
- Prolegomena I–VI: Novum Testamentum Graece. Editio Octava Critica Maior, vol. III, Part 1 (1884)
- Prolegomena VII–VIII: Novum Testamentum Graece. Editio Octava Critica Maior, vol. III, Part 2 (1890)
- Prolegomena IX–XIII: Novum Testamentum Graece. Editio Octava Critica Maior, vol. III, Part 3 (1894)
- Novum Testamentum graece: recensionis Tischendorfianae ultimae textum. Lipsiae 1881

=== LXX ===
- Vetus Testamentum Graece iuxta LXX interpretes: Vetus Testamentum Graece iuxta LXX (Volume 1)
- Vetus Testamentum Graece iuxta LXX interpretes: Vetus Testamentum Graece iuxta LXX (Volume 2)

=== His publications continued ===
- Doctrina Pauli apostoli de vi mortis Christi satisfactoria. Leipzig, 1837 Google
- Fritz der junge Mystiker, oder die drei letzten Festzeiten aus seinem Leben...: eine biographische Skizze. Leipzig, [1839]
- Disputatio de Christo, pane vitae, sive de loco Evang. Ioann. c. VI. vv. 51 – 59 Leipzig, 1839
- Die Geissler: namentlich die große Geißelfahrt nach Straßburg im Jahre 1349. Leipzig, 1840
- De ev. Matth. c. 19. v. 16 et 39. Leipzig, 1840
- De recensionibus quas dicunt textus Novi Testamenti ratione potissimum habita Scholzii: dissertatio historica exegetica critica. Leipzig, 1840 [Hochschulschrift]
- Novum Testamentum Graece / Ad Antiquos Testes Recensuit Lectionesque Variantes Elzeviriorum Stephani Griesbachii Notavit Constantinus Tischendorf. Paris, 1842
- Hē Kainē Diathēkē / In Antiquis Testibus Textum Versionis Vulgatae Latinae Indagavit Lectionesque Variantes Stephani Et Griesbachii Notavit V. S. Venerabili Jager in Consilium Adhibito Constantinus Tischendorf. Paris, 1842
- Codex Ephraemi Syri rescriptus sive fragmenta utriusque testamenti. T.1. Fragmenta Veteris testamenti, T. 2. Fragmenta Novi testamenti. Leipzig, 1843
- Weihnachtspredigt ... in Lengefeld. Leipzig, 1845
- Monumenta sacra inedita sive reliquiae antiquissimae textus Novi testamenti Graeci: ex novum plus mille annorum codicibus per Europam dispersis. Leipzig, 1846
- Codex Friderico-Augustanus sive fragmenta Veteris Testamenti: e codice Graeco, omnium qui in Europa supersunt facile antiquissimo; in Oriente detexit, in patriam attulit. Leipzig, 1846
- De Israelitarum per mare rubrum transitu: cum tabula. Leipzig, 1847
- Evangelium Palatinum ineditum sive reliquiae textus Evangeliorum Latini ante Hieronymum versi: ex Codice Palatino Purpureo quarti vel quinti p. Chr. saeculi. Leipzig, 1847
- Der Geist der Wahrheit: Zeitpredigt am Sonntag Cantate den 6. Mai 1849 in der Universitätskirche zu Leipzig gehalten. Leipzig, 1849
- Novum Testamentum: Latine interprete Hieronymo; ex celeberrimo codice Amiatino omnium et antiquissimo et praestantissimo. Leipzig, 1850
- Acta apostolorum apocrypha. Leipzig, 1851 Google
- Synopsis evangelica: ex quattuor evangeliis ordine chronologico concinnavit. Leipzig, 1851 Google-USA* (5. Aufl. 1884)
- De evangeliorum apocryphorum origine et usu. In: Verhandelingen / uitg. door het Haagsche Genootschap tot Verdediging van de christelijke Godsdienst, Bd. 12, Den Haag, 1851
- Codex Claromontanus sive Epistulae Pauli omnes Graece et Latine: ex Codice Parisiensi celeberrimo nomine Claromontani plerumque dicto sexti ut videtur post Christum saeculi. Leipzig, 1852
- Evangelia apocrypha: adhibitis plurimis codicibus graecis et latinis maximam partem nunc primum consultis atque ineditorum copia insignibus. Leipzig, 1853 Google Editio Altera 1874: Google-USA*
- Novum Testamentum Triglottum: graece, latine, germanice; graecum textum addito lectionum variarum delectu recensuit, latinum Hieronymi notata Clementina lectione ex auctoritate codicum restituit, germanicum ad pristinam lutheranae editionis veritatem revocavit. Leipzig, 1854
- Anecdota sacra et profana ex oriente et occidente allata sive notitia codicum Graecorum, Arabicorum, Syriacorum, Copticorum, Hebraicorum, Aethiopicorum, Latinorum: cum excerptis multis maximam partem Graecis et 35 scripturarum antiquissimarum speciminibus. Leipzig, 1855 Google Editio repetita 1861: Michigan, Google, Google
- Pastor: Graece; ex fragmentis Lipsiensibus. Leipzig, 1856
- Novum Testamentum Graece et Latine: Graecum textum addito lectionum variarum delectu rec.; Latinum Hieronymi notata Clementina lectione ex auct. codicum. Leipzig, 1858
- Notitia editionis Codicis Bibliorum Sinaitici auspiciis imperatoris Alexandri II. susceptae. Leipzig, 1860
- Aus dem heiligen Lande: nebst fünf Abbildungen in Holzschnitt und einer lithographirten Tafel. Leipzig, 1862
- Vorworte zur sinaitischen Bibelhandschrift zu St. Petersburg : unter den Auspicien seiner Kaiserlichen Maiestät Alexander II. dem Dunkel entzogen, nach Europa überbracht, zur Hebung und Verherrlichung christlicher Wissenschaft. Leipzig, 1862
- Novum Testamentum Sinaiticum sive Novum Testamentum cum Epistola Barnabae et Fragmentis Pastoris : ex codice Sinaitico ... Leipzig, 1863
- Die Anfechtungen der Sinai-Bibel. Leipzig, 1865 Google
- Aus Dem Heiligen Lande. Leipzig, 1865 Google
- Wann wurden unsere Evangelien verfasst? Leipzig, 1865 Google, 2. Expl. Google
- Novum Testamentum Graece: ex sinaitico codice omnium antiquissimo vaticana itemque Elzeviriana lectione notata. Leipzig, 1865
- Apocalypses apocryphae Mosis, Esdrae, Pauli, Johannis, item Mariae Dormitio: additis Evangeliorum et actuum Apocryphorum supplementis. Leipzig, 1866 Internet Archive Internet Archive
- Appendix Codicum celeberrimorum Sinaitici, Vaticani, Alexandrini cum imitatione ipsorum antiqua manu scriptorum. Leipzig, 1867
- Philonea: inedita altera, altera nunc demum recte ex vetere scriptura eruta. Leipzig, 1868 Internet Archive
- Responsa ad calumnias romanas: item supplementum novi testamenti ex sinaitico codice anno 1865 editi. Leipzig, 1870
- Novum Testamentum graece: ad antiquissimos testes denuo recensuit, apparatum. Leipzig, 1869–1872. 1. Band 1869 Google-USA*, 2. Band 1872 Google-USA*
- Die Sinaibibel, ihre Entdeckung, Herausgabe und Erwerbung. Leipzig, 1871 Google-USA*
- Die evangelische Alliance-Deputation an Kaiser Alexander zu Friedrichshafen: zur Abwehr der groben Entstellungen und Verleumdungen des Herrn von Wurstemberger (zu Bach bei Bern). Leipzig, 1872
- Clementis Romani epistulae. Ad ipsius codicis alexandrini fidem ac modum repetitis curis edidit Constantinus de Tischendorf. Leipzig, 1873. Internet Archive
- Haben wir den ächten Schrifttext der Evangelisten und Apostel? Leipzig, 1873 Google-USA* (2. Aufl.)
- Liber Psalmorum: hebraicus atque latinus ab Hieronymo ex hebraeo conversus. Leipzig, 1874

=== Cooperation ===
- Textum ... recensuit, brevem apparatum criticum una cum variis lectionibus Elzevirorum, Knapii, Scholzii, Lachmanni subjunxit, argumenta et locos parallelos indicavit, commentationem ... edd. Stephanicae tertiae atque Millianae, Matthaeianae, Griesbachianae praemisit Aenoth. Frid. Const. Tischendorf. Leipzig, 1841
- Clementinorum Epitomae duae: altera edita correctior, inedita altera nunc primum integra ex codicibus Romanis et excerptis Tischendorfianis, cura Alberti Rud. Max. Dressel. Accedunt Friderici Wieseleri Adnotationes criticae ad Clementis Romani quae feruntur homilias. Leipzig, 1859 Internet Archive
- Ad Vetus Testamentum Graecum ex auctoritate Sixti V. Pont. Max. a. 1587 editum a Leandro van Ess quoad textum accuratissime recusum trecentis annis post editionem originalem novis curis iteratum prolegomena et epilegomena. Bredt, 1887
- Novum Testamentum : Constantin Tischendorf: griechisch, lateinisch, englisch, Ostervald: französisch, Martin Luther, DeWette, Richard Nagel: deutsch ... Hrsg. Eugen Niethe Berlin, 1891

=== Second Author ===
- Ezra Abbot: The late Professor Tischendorf. Aus: The Unitarian Review and Religious Magazine. März 1875 (Festschrift Konstantin von Tischendorf)
- Caspar René Gregory: Tischendorf, Lobegott Friedrich Constantin. In: Allgemeine Deutsche Biographie. Band 38. Duncker & Humblot, Leipzig 1894, S. 371–373

== See also ==
- List of New Testament papyri
- List of New Testament uncials
- Agnes and Margaret Smith
- Editio Octava Critica Maior
