= Lectionary 136 =

Lectionary ℓ 136
- New Testament manuscript
- Text: Evangelistarion
- Date: 12th century
- Script: Greek
- Now at: Vatican Library
- Size: 25.1 cm by 17.6 cm

Lectionary 136, designated by siglum ℓ 136 (in the Gregory-Aland numbering) is a Greek manuscript of the New Testament, on parchment leaves. Palaeographically it has been assigned to the 12th century.

== Description ==
The codex contains lessons from the Gospels of John, Matthew, Luke lectionary (Evangelistarium), on 165 parchment leaves (25.1 cm by 17.6 cm), with some lacunae at the beginning and end. The text is written in Greek minuscule letters, in one columns per page, 23 lines per page. It is a palimpsest, the younger text is the Lectionary 135.

== History ==
The manuscript was added to the list of New Testament manuscripts by Scholz. It was examined by Scholz and Gregory.

The manuscript is not cited in the critical editions of the Greek New Testament (UBS3).

Currently the codex is located in the Vatican Library (Barberin. gr. 472) in Rome.

== See also ==
- List of New Testament lectionaries
- Biblical manuscript
- Textual criticism
- Lectionary 134

== Bibliography ==
- J. M. A. Scholz, Biblisch-kritische Reise in Frankreich, der Schweiz, Italien, Palästine und im Archipel in den Jahren 1818, 1819, 1820, 1821: Nebst einer Geschichte des Textes des Neuen Testaments.
