= Novum Testamentum Graece =

Critical edition of the Greek New Testament

- Nestle–Aland Novum Testamentum Graece (28th ed., 2012; hardcover, blue)
- Language: Koine Greek
- Website: Official NA28 text on www.academic-bible.com "The Novum Testamentum Graece (Nestle–Aland) and its history" on www.academic-bible.com

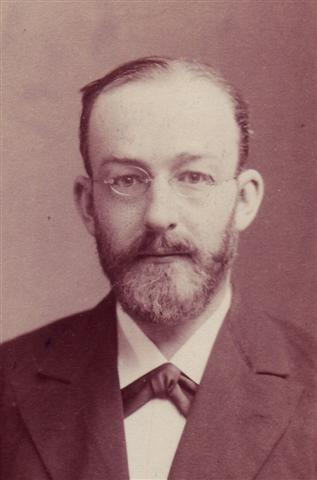
Eberhard Nestle

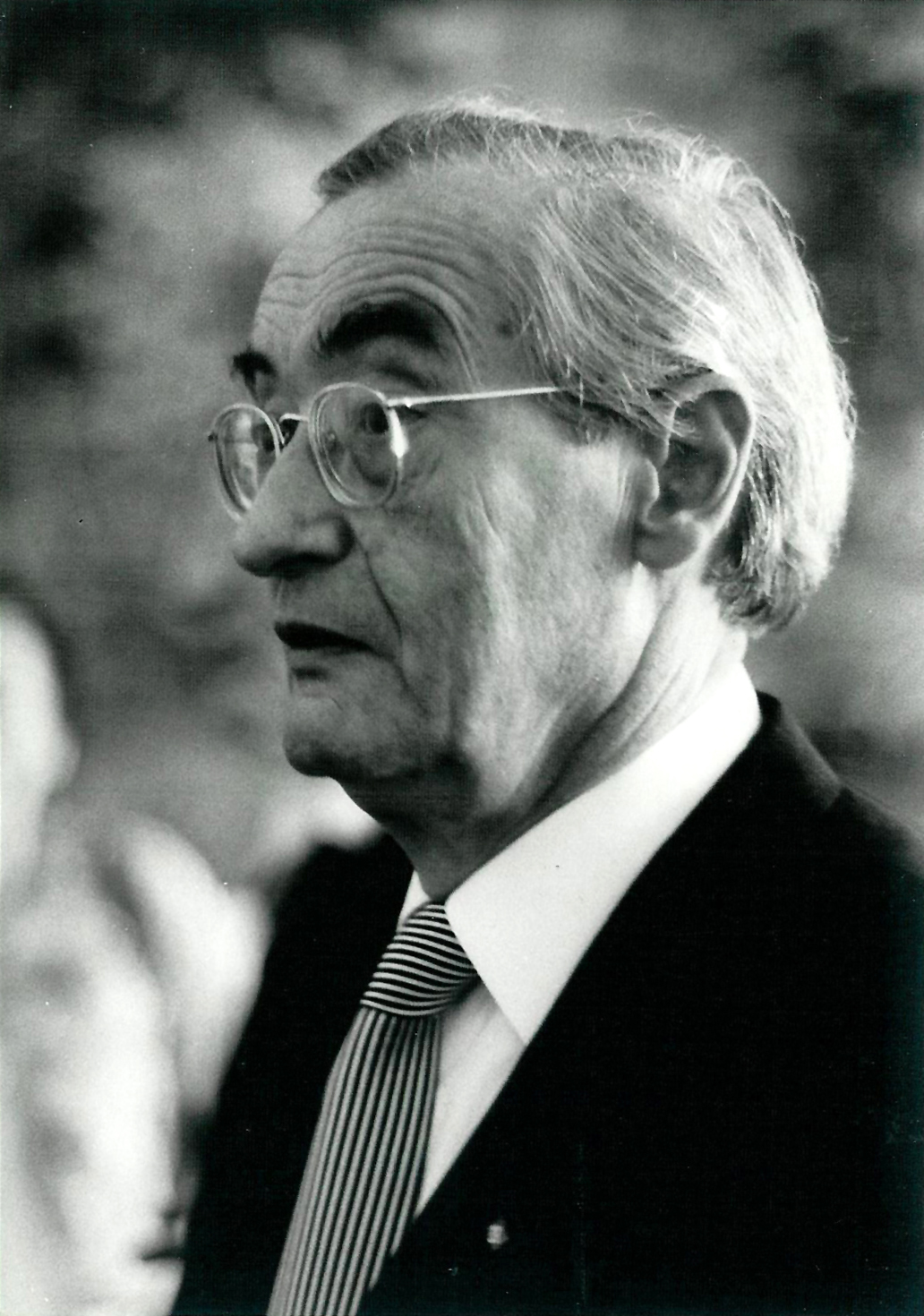
Kurt Aland

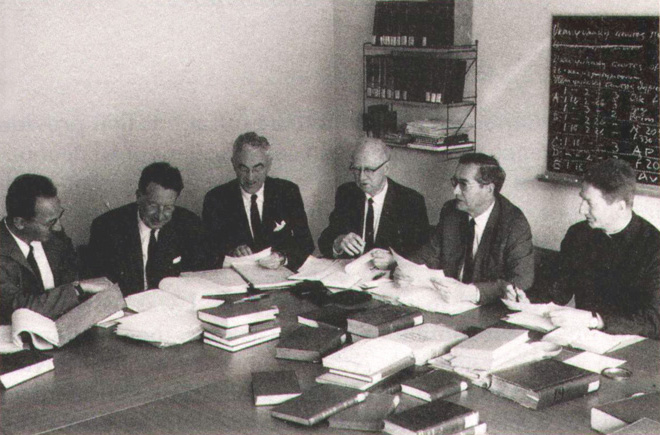
The GNT Committee, from right to left: Carlo Maria Martini, Kurt Aland, Allen Wikgren, Bruce Metzger and Matthew Black (with Klaus Junack, Aland's assistant), c. late 1960s

Novum Testamentum Graece (from lat. Novum Testamentum Græce — "The New Testament in Greek") is a critical edition of the New Testament in its original Koine Greek published by Deutsche Bibelgesellschaft (German Bible Society), forming the basis of most modern Bible translations and biblical criticism. It is also known as the Nestle–Aland edition after its most influential editors, Eberhard Nestle and Kurt Aland. The text, edited by the Institute for New Testament Textual Research, is currently in its 28th edition, abbreviated NA28.

The title is sometimes applied to the United Bible Societies (UBS) edition, which contains the same text (its fifth edition referred to as UBS5, contains the text from NA28). The UBS edition is aimed at translators and so focuses on variants that are important for the meaning whereas the NA includes more variants.

== Methodology ==
The Greek text as presented is what biblical scholars refer to as a "critical text". The critical text is an eclectic text compiled by a committee that compares readings from a large number of manuscripts in order to determine which reading is most likely to be closest to the original. They use a number of factors to help determine probable readings, such as the date of the witness (earlier is usually better), the geographical distribution of a reading, and the likelihood of accidental or intentional corruptions. In the book, a large number of textual variants, or differences between manuscripts, are noted in the critical apparatus—the extensive footnotes that distinguish the Novum Testamentum Graece from other Greek New Testaments.

Most scholars view uncial text as the most accurate; however, a few authors, such as New Testament scholar Maurice A. Robinson, linguist Wilbur Pickering, Arthur Farstad and Zane C. Hodges, claim that the minuscule texts (the Byzantine text-type) more accurately reflect the "autographs" or original texts than an eclectic text like NA28 that relies heavily on manuscripts of the Alexandrian text-type. This view is referred to as the "Byzantine priority theory". The theory has been criticized by Gordon Fee and Bruce Metzger among others. Since the majority of old manuscripts in existence are minuscules, they are often referred to as the Majority Text. The Majority Text as a whole is classified by the editors of the NA28 (of whom Metzger is one) as a "consistently cited witness of the first order," meaning that whenever the text presented differs from the majority text this is recorded in the apparatus along with the alternate reading. Other consistently cited references include the full corpus of papyrus manuscripts available to the authors as well as a wide range of other manuscripts including a selection of both minuscules and uncials.

The Novum Testamentum Graece apparatus summarizes the evidence (from manuscripts and versions) for, and sometimes against, a selection of the most important variants for the study of the text of the New Testament. While eschewing completeness (in the range of variants and in the citation of witnesses), this edition does provide informed readers with a basis by which they can judge for themselves which readings more accurately reflect the originals. The Greek text of the 28th edition is the same as that of the 5th edition of the United Bible Societies' The Greek New Testament (abbreviated UBS5) although there are a few differences between them in paragraphing, capitalization, punctuation and spelling.

== Editions ==
=== History ===
In 1898 Eberhard Nestle published a handbook of textual criticism, and in 1898 published the first edition of a Greek New Testament under the title Novum Testamentum Graece cum apparatu critico ex editionibus et libris manu scriptis collecto.

The text of this Greek New Testament was later combined with the editions of Constantin von Tischendorf (Editio octava critica maior), The New Testament in the Original Greek of Westcott and Hort, and the edition of Richard Francis Weymouth. It was edited by the Württemberg Bible Society in Stuttgart. This edition eliminated the extremes of Tischendorf, such as partiality to Sinaiticus, and of Westcott and Hort, such as partiality to Vaticanus.

Eberhard's son Erwin Nestle took over after his father's death and issued the 13th edition in 1927. This edition introduced a separate critical apparatus and finally introduced consistency to the majority reading principle. In the apparatus only a few minuscules were included.

Kurt Aland became the associate editor of the 21st edition in 1952. At Erwin Nestle's request, he reviewed and expanded the critical apparatus, adding many more manuscripts. This eventually led to the 25th edition of 1963. The most important Papyri and newly discovered Uncials, as 0189, a few Minuscules (33, 614, 2814), occasionally also lectionaries were taken into account.

Members of the Editorial Committee of the United Bible Societies' Greek New Testament comprise:

- UBS1, 1966

Kurt Aland, Matthew Black, Bruce Metzger, Allen Wikgren.

- UBS2, 1968

Kurt Aland, Matthew Black, Bruce Metzger, Allen Wikgren.

- UBS3, 1975

Kurt Aland, Matthew Black, Carlo Maria Martini, Bruce Metzger, Allen Wikgren.

- UBS4, 1993

Barbara Aland, Kurt Aland, Johannes Karavidopoulos, Carlo Maria Martini, Bruce Metzger

- UBS5, 2014

Barbara Aland, Kurt Aland (Aland died a year after the publication of the fourth edition), Johannes Karavidopoulos, Carlo Maria Martini, Bruce Metzger in co-operation with the Institute for New Testament Textual Research, Münster

- UBS6, 2025

Holger Strutwolf, Hugh Houghton, Christos Karakolis, David Parker, Stephen Pisano, David Trobisch, Klaus Wachtel

A more complete set of variants is listed in the multiple volume Novum Testamentum Graecum – Editio Critica Maior. A small number of textual changes in the most current edition were incorporated in the 28th edition of the Nestle–Aland, published in 2012. Papyri 117-127 were used in this edition.

=== Current editions ===
The NA28 text is published by Deutsche Bibelgesellschaft (the German Bible Society).

- Greek:
  - Novum Testamentum Graece, Standard 28th edition, ISBN 978-3-438-05140-0 (2012).
  - Novum Testamentum Graece, Large Print 27th edition, ISBN 978-3-438-05103-5 (1993).
  - Novum Testamentum Graece, Wide Margin 27th edition, ISBN 978-3-438-05135-6
  - Novum Testamentum Graece, 28th edition with A Concise Greek-English Dictionary of the New Testament (by B. M. Newman), ISBN 978-3-438-05160-8
  - Novum Testamentum Graece, 28th edition with Greek-German Dictionary, ISBN 978-3-438-05159-2
  - Biblia Sacra Utriusque Testamenti Editio Hebraica et Graeca (NA27 with the Biblia Hebraica Stuttgartensia), ISBN 978-3-438-05250-6
- Diglot:
  - Das Neue Testament Griechisch und Deutsch, ISBN 978-3-438-05406-7 (with revised Luther and Common Bible in parallel columns)
  - Nestle–Aland Greek-English New Testament, ISBN 978-3-438-05408-1 (with Revised Standard Version, 2nd edition)
  - New English Translation-Novum Testamentum Graece New Testament, ISBN 978-3-438-05420-3
  - Novum Testamentum Graece et Latine, ISBN 978-3-438-05401-2 (with Nova Vulgata)
  - Nuovo Testamento Greco-Italiano, ISBN 978-3-438-05409-8 (with the Versione Conferenza Episcopale Italiana)

== Accuracy of manuscripts ==
In The Text of the New Testament, Kurt and Barbara Aland compare the total number of variant-free verses, and the number of variants per page (excluding orthographic errors), among the seven major editions of the Greek NT (Tischendorf, Westcott-Hort, von Soden, Vogels, Merk, Bover, and Nestle–Aland) concluding 62.9%, or 4999/7947, agreement. They concluded, "Thus in nearly two-thirds of the New Testament text, the seven editions of the Greek New Testament which we have reviewed are in complete accord, with no differences other than in orthographical details (e.g., the spelling of names, etc.). Verses in which any one of the seven editions differs by a single word are not counted. This result is quite amazing, demonstrating a far greater agreement among the Greek texts of the New Testament during the past century than textual scholars would have suspected […]. In the Gospels, Acts, and Revelation the agreement is less, while in the letters it is much greater." For over 250 years, New Testament apologists have argued that no textual variant affects key Christian doctrine.

Book	Verses	Variant-free verses	Percentage	Average variants per page
Matthew	1071	642	59.9%	6.8
Mark	678	306	45.1%	10.3
Luke	1151	658	57.2%	6.9
John	869	450	51.8%	8.5
Acts	1006	677	67.3%	4.2
Romans	433	327	75.5%	2.9
1 Corinthians	437	331	75.7%	3.5
2 Corinthians	256	200	78.1%	2.8
Galatians	149	114	76.5%	3.3
Ephesians	155	118	76.1%	2.9
Philippians	104	73	70.2%	2.5
Colossians	95	69	72.6%	3.4
1 Thessalonians	89	61	68.5%	4.1
2 Thessalonians	47	34	72.3%	3.1
1 Timothy	113	92	81.4%	2.9
2 Timothy	83	66	79.5%	2.8
Titus	46	33	71.7%	2.3
Philemon	25	19	76.0%	5.1
Hebrews	303	234	77.2%	2.9
James	108	66	61.6%	5.6
1 Peter	105	70	66.6%	5.7
2 Peter	61	32	52.5%	6.5
1 John	105	76	72.4%	2.8
2 John	13	8	61.5%	4.5
3 John	15	11	73.3%	3.2
Jude	25	18	72.0%	4.2
Revelation	405	214	52.8%	5.1
Total	7947	4999	62.9%	

== Influence ==
A 2008 comparison of the textual and stylistic choices of twenty translations against 15,000 variant readings shows the following rank of agreement with the Nestle–Aland 27th edition:

Abbreviation	Name	Relative agreement
NASB	New American Standard Bible	1
ASV	American Standard Version	2
NASB	New American Standard (1995 update)	3
NAB	New American Bible	4
ESV	English Standard Version	5
HCS	Holman Christian Standard	6
NRSV	New Revised Standard Version	7
NET	New English Translation	8
RSV	Revised Standard Version	9
NIV	New International Version	10
NJB	New Jerusalem Bible	11
REB	Revised English Bible	12
JNT	Jewish New Testament	13
GNB	Good News Bible	14
NLT	New Living Translation	15
DRA	Douay-Rheims (American edition)	16
TLB	The Living Bible	17
MRD	Murdock Peshitta translation	18
NKJV	New King James Version	19
KJV	King James Version	20

== See also ==
- Alexandrian text-type
- Byzantine text-type
- Caesarean text-type
- List of Bible verses not included in modern translations
- List of major textual variants in the New Testament
- Textual criticism
- Textus Receptus
- Westcott-Hort
- Textus Receptus
- Western text-type
