= Matthew Black =

Scottish minister and biblical scholar (1908–1994)

Matthew Black FBA FRSE
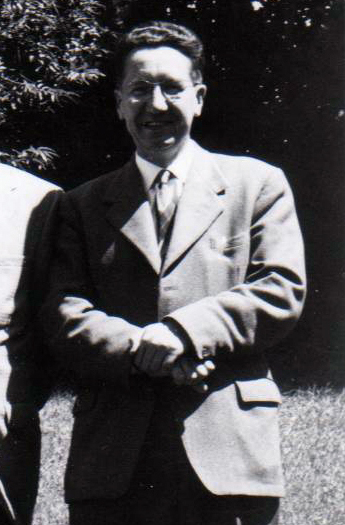
- Meeting of the American Bible Society circa 1960
- Born: 3 September 1908; Kilmarnock, Scotland
- Died: 2 October 1994 (aged 86); St Andrews, Scotland
- Occupations: Professor of Biblical Criticism and Antiquities
- Known for: First editor of the journal, New Testament Studies
- Board member of: President of the Society of Old Testament Studies
- Awards: Fellow of the British Academy, Fellow of the Royal Society of Edinburgh

Academic background
- Education: University of Glasgow, University of Bonn
- Alma mater: University of Glasgow

Academic work
- Institutions: Edinburgh University, St Andrews University

Rev Matthew Black FBA FRSE (3 September 1908 in Kilmarnock – 2 October 1994 in St Andrews) was a Scottish minister and biblical scholar. He was the first editor of the journal, New Testament Studies.

== Life ==
He was born in Kilmarnock the son of James Black. He attended Kilmarnock Academy.

After earning an M.A. and B.D. in Old Testament at the University of Glasgow, Black then studied at the University of Bonn and returned to the University of Glasgow for his D.Litt.

From 1942 to 1947 he was minister of Dunbarney.

From 1952 to 1954 he was Professor of Biblical Criticism and Antiquities at Edinburgh University and from 1954 to 1978 Professor of Divinity and Biblical Criticism at St Andrews University.

In 1968 he was President of the Society of Old Testament Studies.

He died in St Andrews in Fife.

== New Testament work ==
Together with Kurt Aland, Carlo Maria Martini, Bruce M. Metzger and Allen Wikgren, Black served on the editorial committee that established the Greek text and critical apparatuses in the standard hand editions of the Greek New Testament: the Nestle-Aland Novum Testamentum Graece (26th edition, published by the Deutsche Bibelgesellschaft first in 1979 and revised in 1983) and the United Bible Societies' The Greek New Testament (3rd edition, published by the United Bible Societies in 1983).

Black was the General Editor and New Testament Editor for the Revised edition of Peake's Commentary on the Bible (1962).

Black served as New Testament Editor for The New Century Bible Commentary series, and contributed the volume on Romans.

== Family ==
He married Ethel M. Hall in 1938.

== Works ==
=== Books ===
- ——— (1933). An Aramaic Approach to the Gospels and Acts. Oxford: Oxford Clarendon Press. OCLC 1014663152.
- ——— (1938). Rituale Melchitarum: a christian Palestinian euchologion. Bonner orientalistische Studien. Vol. 22. Stuttgart: Kohlhammer Verlag. OCLC 230705827.
- ——— (1961). The Scrolls and Christian Origins. New York: Scribner. OCLC 5180119.

=== Edited by ===
- ———, ed. (1954). A Christian Palestinian Syriac Horologion (Berlin ms. Or. Oct. 1019). Texts and studies (Cambridge, England), new ser. Vol. 1. Cambridge: Cambridge University Press. OCLC 1359355.
- ———; Smalley, William A., eds. (1974). On Language, Culture and Religion: in honor of Eugene A. Nida. Approaches to semiotics. Vol. 56. The Hague: Mouton. ISBN 9789027930118. OCLC 1183988.

== See also ==
- Aramaic New Testament
