= Lectionary 134 =

Lectionary ℓ 134
- New Testament manuscript
- Text: Evangelistarion
- Date: 13th century
- Script: Greek
- Now at: Vatican Library
- Size: 33.7 cm by 28.5 cm

Lectionary 134, designated by siglum ℓ 134 (in the Gregory-Aland numbering) is a Greek manuscript of the New Testament, on parchment leaves. Palaeographically it has been assigned to the 13th century.

== Description ==
The codex contains lessons from the Gospels of John, Matthew, Luke lectionary (Evangelistarium), on 343 parchment leaves (33.7 cm by 28.5 cm). It has some lacunae at the end. The text is written in Greek minuscule letters, in two columns per page, 21 lines per page, in large letters.

The first eight and the last three leaves being paper.

It contains the Pericope Adulterae (John 8:3-11).

== History ==
The manuscript was added to the list of New Testament manuscripts by Scholz. It was examined by Scholz and Gregory.

The manuscript is not cited in the critical editions of the Greek New Testament (UBS3).

Currently the codex is located in the Vatican Library (Barberin. gr. 416) in Rome.

== See also ==
- List of New Testament lectionaries
- Biblical manuscript
- Textual criticism
- Lectionary 136

== Bibliography ==
- J. M. A. Scholz, Biblisch-kritische Reise in Frankreich, der Schweiz, Italien, Palästine und im Archipel in den Jahren 1818, 1819, 1820, 1821: Nebst einer Geschichte des Textes des Neuen Testaments.
