= Editio Critica Maior =

Critical edition of the Greek New Testament

The Editio Critica Maior (shortened to ECM) is a critical edition of the Greek New Testament being produced by the Institute for New Testament Textual Research at the University of Münster, Germany, in collaboration with other international institutes.

The Editio Critica Maior project is supported by the Union of German Academies of Sciences and Humanities. It is to be completed by the year 2030.

== Methodology ==
The ECM is a documentation of the expressions of Christian faith communities as they transmitted the New Testament in time through Greek manuscripts, translations, and ancient citations in the first 1,000 years of New Testament transmission. The difference between earlier and later readings is shown by the concept of 'direction' in the ECM, with the earliest expression of the Christian readings printed in the main text. Its aim is to edit the text of every book of the Greek New Testament utilising every single New Testament manuscript in existence, which is required in order to evaluate the entire manuscript tradition and make judgements based on the variant readings.

The Coherence Based Genealogical Method (CBGM) is the method being used to construct the ECM. The CBGM has two components, pregenealogical coherence and genealogical coherence. Pregenealogical coherence is a text-critical method which uses computer tools to compare the places of variation to determine if the readings are related. Then, critical principles are applied by a textual scholar to make a decision on the directionality of the reading itself. Places where the direction cannot be determined, or split readings, are indicated by a diamond in the text. The ECM edition of the Greek New Testament thus includes:

1. a systematic assessment of witnesses
2. a mature consideration of those witnesses
3. a reconstruction of the oldest form of the recoverable text, or initial text
4. a complete and systematic apparatus
5. a full explanation and justification of its methodology and conclusions.

== Publication ==
Each publication consists of three different volumes: the main Greek text (which can come in one or more parts); supplementary material; and studies on the text and transmission of the particular book/collection of Epistles. Alongside the printed editions are the digital editions available at the New Testament Virtual Manuscript Room (NTVMR), released simultaneously but not consisting of the "studies".

The Gospel of Mark edition had a selection of 206 total Greek manuscript witnesses which the text was based on, of which 174 manuscripts either disagreed with the Byzantine Majority text less than 90%, or agreed with it as approximately to 100%. This selection is based on 196 test passages in the Gospel of Mark where every Greek manuscript known was collated, and variants noted. The editorial team for the ECM of Mark consisted of Georg Gabel, Annette Hufmeier, Marie-Luise Lakmann, Gregory S. Paulson, Klaus Wachtel, and Holger Strutwolf.

== Result ==
The recent editions of Nestle-Aland (the 28th edition), and the Greek New Testament of the United Bible Societies (the 5th edition), follow the text of the ECM for the Catholic epistles.

== Current editions ==
The Novum Testamentum Graecum Editio Critica Maior is published by Deutsche Bibelgesellschaft (the German Bible Society).

The Gospel of Mark

- Novum Testamentum Graecum Editio Critica Maior, I/2.1, The Gospel of Mark, Part 2.1, Text, ISBN 978-3-438-05615-3
- Novum Testamentum Graecum Editio Critica Maior, I/2.2, The Gospel of Mark, Part 2.2, Supplementary Material, ISBN 978-3-438-05616-0
- Novum Testamentum Graecum Editio Critica Maior, I/2.3, The Gospel of Mark, Part 2.3, Studies, ISBN 978-3-438-05617-7

The Acts of the Apostles

- Novum Testamentum Graecum Editio Critica Maior, III/1.1, The Acts of the Apostles, Part 1.1, Text, Chapter 1-14, ISBN 978-3-438-05609-2
- Novum Testamentum Graecum Editio Critica Maior, III/1.2, The Acts of the Apostles, Part 1.2, Text, Chapter 15-28, ISBN 978-3-438-05610-8
- Novum Testamentum Graecum Editio Critica Maior, III/2, The Acts of the Apostles, Part 2, Supplementary Material, ISBN 978-3-438-05612-2
- Novum Testamentum Graecum Editio Critica Maior, III/3, The Acts of the Apostles, Part 3, Studies, ISBN 978-3-438-05613-9

Catholic Letters

- Novum Testamentum Graecum Editio Critica Maior, IV/1, Catholic Letters, Part 1, Text, ISBN 978-3-438-05606-1
- Novum Testamentum Graecum Editio Critica Maior, IV/2, Catholic Letters, Part 2, Supplementary Material, ISBN 978-3-438-05607-8

Revelation

- Novum Testamentum Graecum Editio Critica Maior, VI/1, Revelation, Part 1, Text, ISBN 978-3-438-05619-1
- Novum Testamentum Graecum Editio Critica Maior, VI/2, Revelation, Part 2, Supplementary Material, ISBN 978-3-438-05620-7
- Novum Testamentum Graecum Editio Critica Maior, VI/3.1, Revelation, Part 3.1, Studies, ISBN 978-3-438-05621-4
- Novum Testamentum Graecum Editio Critica Maior, VI/3.2, Revelation, Part 3.2, Studies on Punctuation and Textual Structure, ISBN 978-3-438-05622-1

Parallel Pericopes

- Novum Testamentum Graecum Editio Critica Maior, Parallel Pericopes, ISBN 978-3-438-05608-5

== See also ==
- Editio Octava Critica Maior
