= Ernest Cadman Colwell =

American academic (1901–1974)

- Born: January 19, 1901; Hallstead, Pennsylvania
- Died: September 12, 1974 (aged 73); DeLand, Florida

Academic background
- Education: Emory College; Candler School of Theology; University of Chicago

Academic work
- Discipline: Theology; Biblical studies
- Sub-discipline: New Testament studies
- Institutions: University of Chicago; Claremont School of Theology

Ernest Cadman Colwell (19 January 1901 – 12 September 1974) was an American biblical scholar, textual critic and palaeographer.

== Life ==
After graduating from Emory College and Candler School of Theology, Colwell earned a Ph.D. in the Department of New Testament and Early Christian Literature at the University of Chicago for his 1930 dissertation on "The Character of the Greek of the Fourth Gospel: Parallels to the 'Aramaisms' of the Fourth Gospel from Epictetus and the Papyri". He then joined the Chicago faculty (1930–1951) and served the university in many capacities, including as chief operating officer and then as president of the university (1945–1951) under Chancellor Robert M. Hutchins.

Returning to Emory, Colwell then served as vice president and dean of faculties from 1951 to 1957, founding at this time the Graduate Institute of the Liberal Arts. From 1957 to 1968, Colwell was president of the Claremont School of Theology (Claremont, California), establishing the school on a new campus after its separation from the University of Southern California in 1956. Colwell also chaired the Board of Trustees of Atlanta's Interdenominational Theological Center. In 1966, Colwell was director during the planning stages of the Institute for Antiquity and Christianity in Claremont, and finally retired as chairman of the Institute's Research Council in 1971. For many years, he was also director of one of the initial research projects at the Institute for Antiquity and Christianity, namely, as (American) chairman the executive committee of the International Greek New Testament Project (IGNTP). Colwell was invited to deliver the 1946 Quillian lectures at Emory (on "An Approach to the Teaching of Jesus") and the 1962 Cole lectures at Vanderbilt University (on "Jesus and the Gospel").

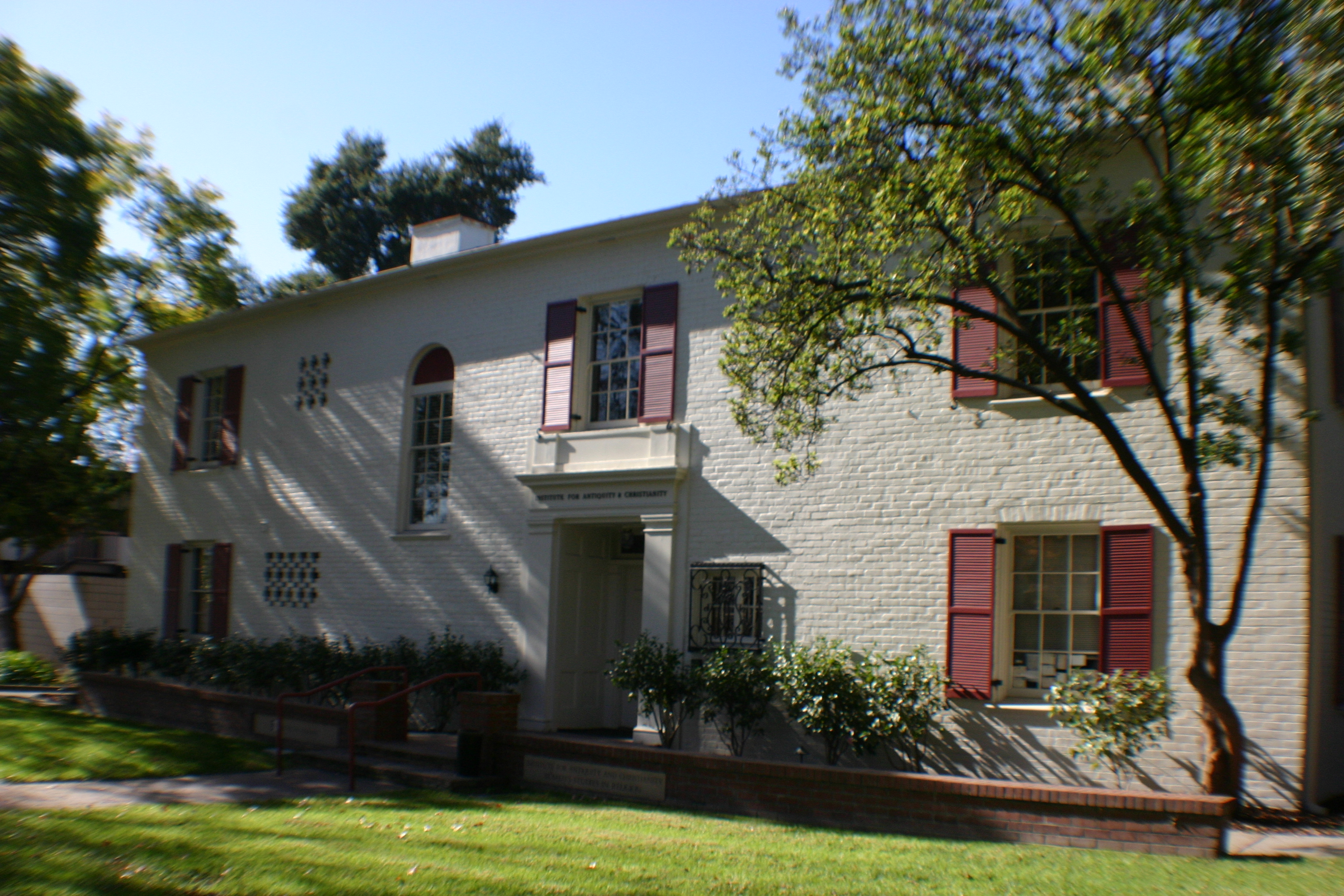
The Institute for Antiquity and Christianity (Claremont), founded under the directorship of Ernest Cadman Colwell.

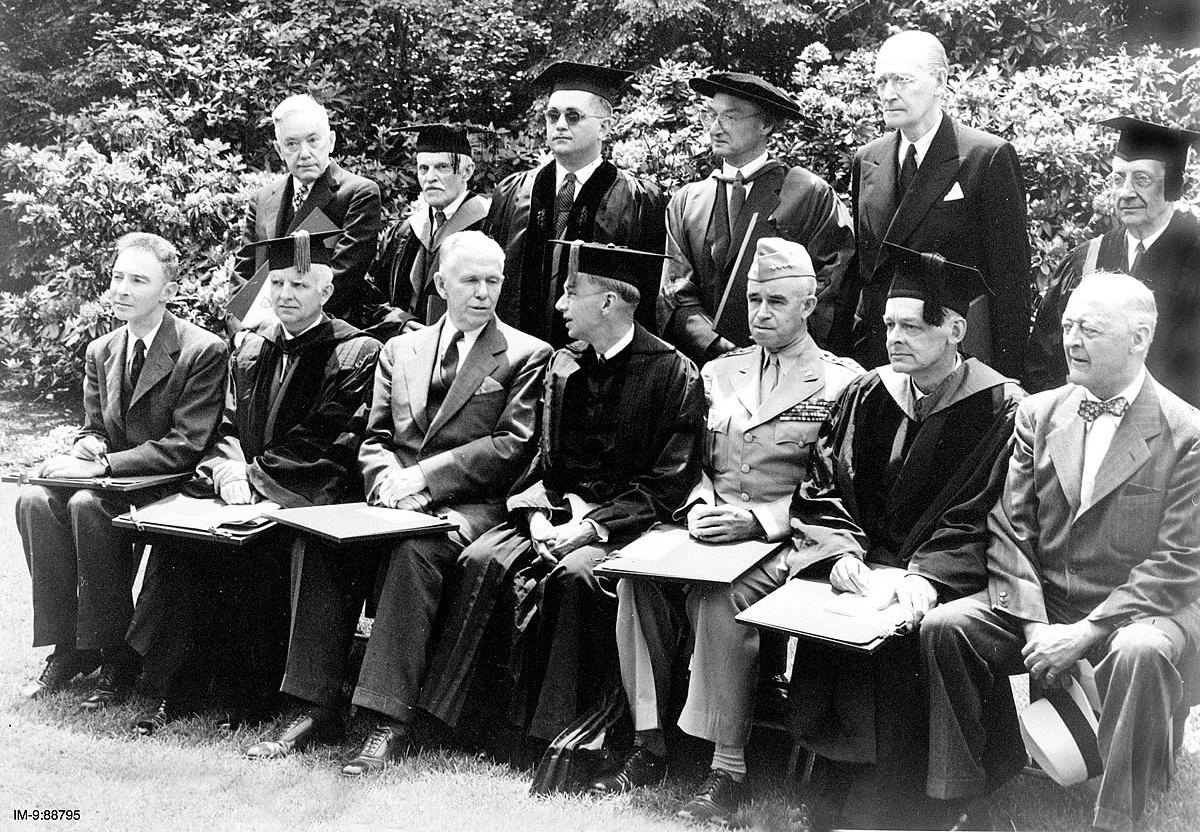
On June 5, 1947, at Harvard University, first row, from left to right: Robert Oppenheimer, Colwell, General George Marshall, James B. Conant (Harvard president), General Omar Bradley, T. S. Eliot, James W. Wadsworth Jr., for the granting of honorary degrees to Oppenheimer, Colwell, Marshall, Bradley and Eliot.

== Work ==
Colwell recognized an extraordinary textual affinity between Minuscule 2427 and Codex Vaticanus. According to him the codex 2427 preserved a "primitive text" of the Gospel of Mark ("Archaic Mark"). He found that from 73 singular readings of Codex Vaticanus, 46 are shared with codex 2427. Minuscule 2427 has since been shown to be a forgery. Colwell examined Minuscule 330 and found that the text of the Pauline epistles of this codex is textually very close to the codices 451, 2400 and 2492.

Upon examining corrections in Papyrus 66, Codex Sinaiticus, Codex Alexandrinus and Codex Washingtonianus, Colwell found a textual relationship between them. In his analysis Colwell excluded singular readings. In 1959 Colwell, together with M. M. Parvis, developed a new method of dealing with the multitude of witnesses available to those engaged in the textual criticism of the New Testament. This method usually is known as the Claremont Profile Method. This method was developed in part to provide a means of selecting Greek minuscule manuscripts for the International Greek New Testament Project (IGNTP).

== "Colwell's rule" ==
Colwell wrote, "Definite predicate nouns which precede the verb usually lack the article... a predicate nominative which precedes the verb cannot be translated as an indefinite or a 'qualitative' noun solely because of the absence of the article; if the context suggests that the predicate is definite, it should be translated as a definite noun...."

== Select works ==
- Colwell, Ernest Cadman (2011) [1931]. The Greek of the Fourth Gospel: A Study of its Aramaisms in the Light of Hellenistic Greek. Chicago, IL: The University of Chicago Press. ISBN 9781610971294.
- Colwell, Ernest Cadman; Riddle, Donald W. (1933). Prolegomena to the Study of the Lectionary Text of the Gospels. Studies in the Lectionary Text of the Greek New Testament. Vol. 1. Chicago, IL: The University of Chicago Press. OCLC 1438017.
- Colwell, Ernest Cadman (1976) [1937]. The Study of the Bible. Chicago, IL: The University of Chicago Press. ISBN 1135088357. OCLC 752436710.
- Colwell, Ernest Cadman; Willoughby, Harold R. (1936). The Four Gospels of Karahissar (in 2 vols). Chicago, IL: The University of Chicago Press. OCLC 905508.
- Colwell, Ernest Cadman (1952). What Is the Best New Testament?. Chicago, IL: The University of Chicago Press. OCLC 2914408.
- Colwell, Ernest Cadman; Tune, Ernest W. (1965). A Beginner's Reader-Grammar for New Testament Greek. New York: Harper & Row. ISBN 9780060615307. OCLC 1601574.
- Colwell, Ernest Cadman (1969). Studies in Methodology in Textual Criticism of the New Testament. New Testament tools and studies. Vol. 9. Grand Rapids, MI: E.J. Brill & Eerdmans. OCLC 70803.

== Festschrift ==
- Trotter, F. Thomas, ed. (1968). Jesus and the Historian: Written in Honor of Ernest Cadman Colwell. Philadelphia, PA: Westminster Press. OCLC 383390.
