= Erwin Nestle =

German scholar

Erwin Nestle (22 May 1883 in Münsingen, Germany – 21 November 1972 in Ulm, Germany), son of Eberhard Nestle, was a German scholar who continued editing his father's "Nestle Edition" of the New Testament in Greek, adding a full critical apparatus in the thirteenth edition.
