= Allen Wikgren =

American New Testament scholar (1906–1998)

Allen P. Wikgren
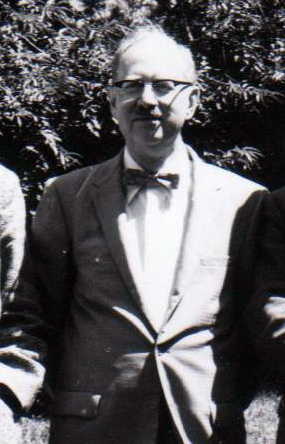
- Meeting of the American Bible Society circa 1960
- Born: December 3, 1906; Chicago, Illinois, U.S.
- Died: May 7, 1998 (aged 91); Woodruff, Wisconsin, U.S.
- Occupation: New Testament scholar

Academic background
- Education: University of Chicago
- Thesis: A Comparative Study of the Theodotionic and Septuagint Versions of Daniel (1932)

Academic work
- Discipline: New Testament studies
- Institutions: University of Chicago

Allen Paul Wikgren (December 3, 1906 – May 7, 1998) was an American New Testament scholar and professor at the University of Chicago. His work centered on the text of the New Testament and New Testament manuscripts, but also included Hellenistic and biblical Greek, the deuterocanonical books (apocrypha), early Jewish literature (particularly Josephus), and work on the Revised Standard Version English translation of the Bible.

== Education ==
Wikgren earned his Bachelor of Arts degree (cum laude) in Greek in 1928, his Master of Arts degree in 1929 and his Ph.D. in 1932, all from the University of Chicago. His doctoral dissertation was entitled A Comparative Study of the Theodotionic and Septuagint Versions of Daniel.

== Biography ==
An ordained minister in the mainline Northern Baptist Convention, Wikgren then served as a minister at First Baptist Church in Belleville, Kansas and as a professor of New Testament literature at Kansas City Baptist Theological Seminary (now Central Baptist Theological Seminary in Shawnee, Kansas) (1935-1937) and of biblical literature and classics at Ottawa University in Ottawa, Kansas (1937-1940) before returning to Chicago to join the University of Chicago Divinity School as the J. M. Powis Smith Instructor in 1940. At Chicago, Wikgren was a member of the Department of New Testament and Early Christian Literature in the university's Division of the Humanities, a department which he would later serve as chair. His colleagues in New Testament studies during his long tenure administering the department (1953-1972) included figures such as Norman Perrin, Robert M. Grant and Markus Barth.

Perhaps Wikgren's most widely known contribution to the study of the New Testament was his role, together with Kurt Aland, Matthew Black, Carlo Maria Martini and Bruce M. Metzger, on the editorial committee that established the Greek text and critical apparatuses in the standard hand editions of the Greek New Testament: the Nestle-Aland Novum Testamentum Graece (26th edition, published by the Deutsche Bibelgesellschaft first in 1979 and revised in 1983) and the United Bible Societies' The Greek New Testament (3rd edition, published by the United Bible Societies in 1983).

Wikgren served as president of the Chicago Society of Biblical Research in 1951–1952. He was a member of the Revised Standard Version (RSV) committee from 1952, participating in the translation of the deuterocanonical books and the revision of the New Testament. And he was director of the Chicago Lectionary Project from 1958 to 1972. He also held visiting professorships at a number of universities: Indiana University–Gary, Pacific School of Religion (Berkeley, California), University of Ghana, Århus University, Concordia Theological Seminary (Springfield, Illinois [now back in Fort Wayne, Indiana]) and Uppsala University.

== Works ==
=== Thesis ===
- Wikgren, Allen P. (1932). A Comparative Study of the Theodotionic and Septuagint translations of Daniel (Ph.D.). Chicago, IL: University of Chicago Press. OCLC 7493395.

=== Books ===
- ——— (1974). A Leaf from the First Edition of the First Complete Bible in English, the Coverdale Bible, 1535: With an Historical Introduction. Book Club of California. Vol. 145. San Francisco: Book Club of California. OCLC 1177496.
- ———; Martin, Ira Jay (1989). A Catalogue of English Bibles in the University of Chicago Library - in 2 vols. Chicago, IL: University of Chicago Press. OCLC 20005123.

=== As editor ===
- ———; Marcus, Ralph, eds. (1943). Josephus, Jewish Antiquities, Volume VI: Books 14-15. Loeb Classical Library. Vol. 489. Cambridge, MA: Harvard University Press. ISBN 9780674995383. OCLC 903198875.
- ———; Marcus, Ralph; Colwell, Ernest Cadman, eds. (1947). Hellenistic Greek Texts. Chicago, IL: The University of Chicago Press. ISBN 9780226896885. OCLC 313733.
- ———; Parvis, Merrill M., eds. (1950). New Testament Manuscript Studies: The Materials and the Making of a Critical Apparatus. Chicago, IL: The University of Chicago Press. OCLC 377447.
- Price, Ira Maurice (1956). ———; Irwin, William A. (eds.). Ancestry of our English Bible: An Account of Manuscripts, Texts, and Versions of the Bible (3rd revised ed.). New York: Harper & Brothers. OCLC 1004882733.
- ———, ed. (1961). Early Christian Origins: Studies in Honor of Harold R. Willoughby. Chicago: Quadrangle Books. OCLC 907855.
- ———; Marcus, Ralph, eds. (1963). Josephus, Jewish Antiquities, Volume VII: Books 16-17. Loeb Classical Library. Vol. 410. Cambridge, MA: Harvard University Press. ISBN 9780674995789. OCLC 903198875.

== Festschriften ==
- Allison, Robert W. (December 1, 1972). "Allen P. Wikgren: Biography and Bibliography". In Aune, David Edward (ed.). Studies in New Testament and Early Christian Literature: Essays in Honor of Allen P. Wikgren. Novum Testamentum, Supplements. Vol. 33. Leiden: BRILL. pp. 252–257. doi:10.1163/9789004266155. ISBN 978-90-04-03504-1.
