= Kurt Aland =

German theologian (1915–1994)

Kurt Aland FBA
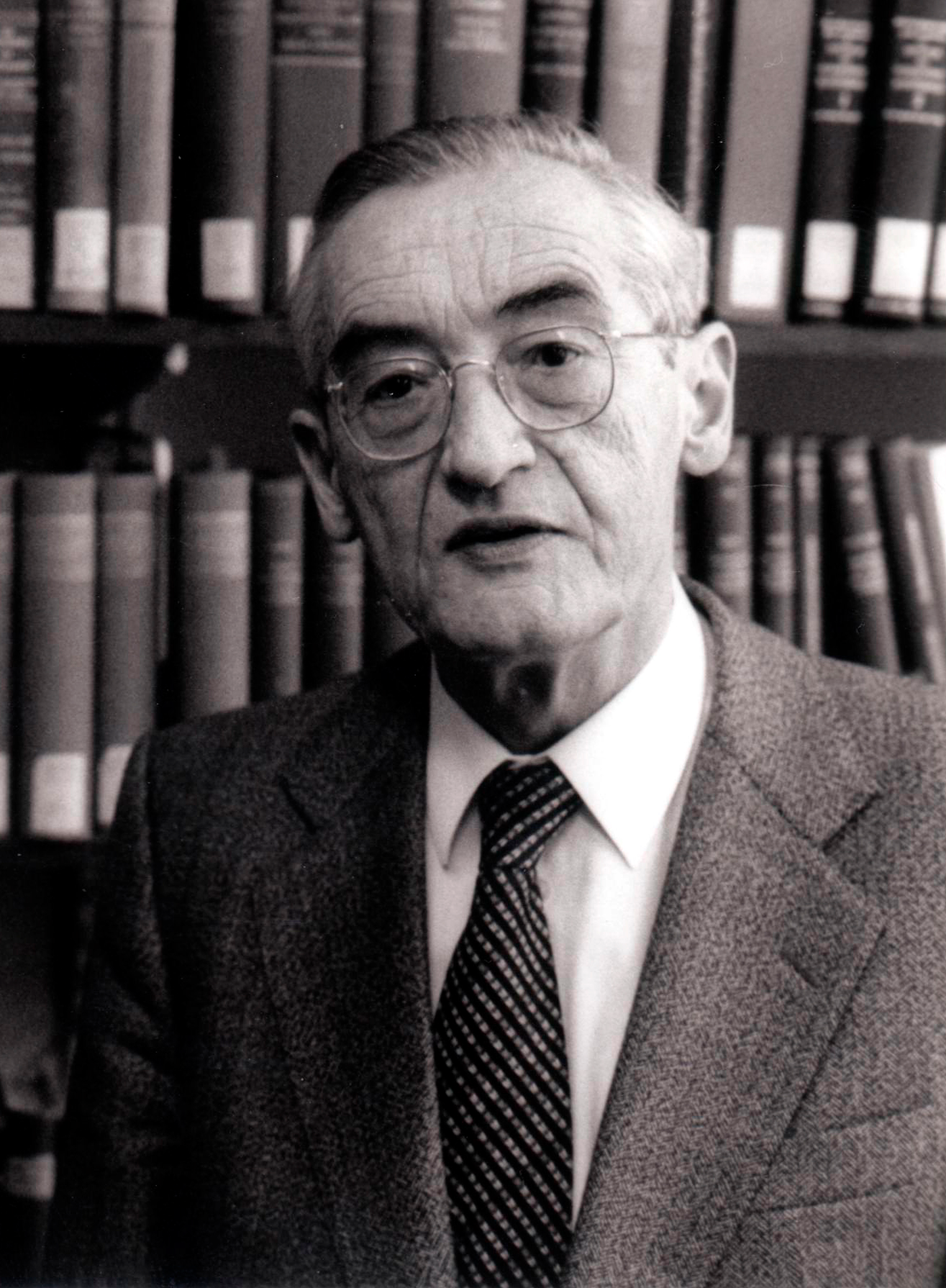
- Born: 28 March 1915; Berlin-Steglitz, German Empire
- Died: 13 April 1994 (aged 79); Münster, Germany
- Occupations: Biblical scholar, textual critic, author
- Notable work: Greek New Testament, Novum Testamentum Graece, Categories of New Testament manuscripts, Institute for New Testament Textual Research, Synopsis of the Four Gospels, Editio Critica Maior
- Spouses: Ingeborg Aland (m. 1941–1971) Barbara Aland (m. 1972–1994)
- Children: Christa, Detlef, Andreas
- Theological work
- Era: 20th century
- Main interests: Textual criticism of the New Testament, Manuscripts of the New Testament

Kurt Aland FBA (28 March 1915 – 13 April 1994) was a German theologian and biblical scholar who specialized in New Testament textual criticism. He founded the Institut für neutestamentliche Textforschung (Institute for New Testament Textual Research) in Münster and served as its first director from 1959 to 1983. He was one of the principal editors of Nestle–Aland – Novum Testamentum Graece for the Deutsche Bibelgesellschaft and The Greek New Testament for the United Bible Societies.

== Life ==
Aland was born in Berlin-Steglitz. He started studying theology in 1933 at the Friedrich-Wilhelms-Universität in Berlin (he also studied philology, archaeology, and history). On 23 March that year, he was examined before the Bruderrat (council of brothers) in the Bekennende Kirche (Confessing Church). During his studies, he worked for the journal of the Confessing Church, Junge Kirche (Young Church). In an ideological brochure, Wer fälscht? (Who is lying?), written against Mathilde Ludendorff, he confirmed the position of the Confessing Church and identified with them. In 1939, he studied for his bachelor's degree under the guidance of Hans Lietzmann. In 1940, he was released from military service; and, in 1941, after Lietzmann's death, he took over the responsibilities of editing the Theologische Literaturzeitung (the only German theological magazine at that time). He graduated that same year, and in 1944 was ordained as minister of the parish of Berlin-Steglitz.

After World War II, Aland became a lecturer on the theological faculty of the Humboldt University of Berlin. In 1947, he was appointed professor ordinarius in Halle (Saale).

Aland disapproved of the Marxist government of East Germany, and was persecuted as a result. In 1953, he was accused of smuggling watches to West Berlin and was kept under arrest for three months. Aland frequently spoke out against various forms of state oppression directed at churches and also demanded freedom of speech in East Germany. In July 1958, he lost his job at the university. However, in September of that year, he successfully escaped to West Berlin. His 8000-volume library was incorporated into the University Library.

In 1958, Aland became a professor at the University of Münster, Germany. In 1960 he declined the offer for a professorship at the University of Chicago. In Münster he founded the Institute for New Testament Textual Research ("Institut für neutestamentliche Textforschung") in 1959, which he directed until 1983. Furthermore, he founded the world's first "Bible Museum" in 1979, which was unique in the world for many years. His institute achieved worldwide recognition by publishing the Nestle–Aland – Novum Testamentum Graece and The Greek New Testament for the United Bible Societies.

Aland was married twice. His first marriage was to Ingeborg Aland (they had three children together). In 1972, he married Barbara Aland. He died in Münster, Germany, in 1994.

== Achievements ==
Kurt Aland was representative of increasing specialism within theological-historical studies. In the field of New Testament research, his work (and also the work that he did together with his wife Barbara Aland in the Institute for New Testament Textual Research in Münster) is internationally acclaimed.

The focus of his work began as an intense and adventurous search for old manuscripts on several expeditions to abbeys in Russia and Greece (amongst others). He discovered numerous manuscripts of the New Testament, whose evaluation is still in progress. Most notable among his work was the newly arranged edition of Novum Testamentum Graece (Greek New Testament) in 1979 (also called Nestle–Aland). This textual foundation for the New Testament exemplifies a scholarly mentality aimed at achieving the highest possible convergence with the "original text."

Furthermore, he acted in the Hermann-Kunst-Stiftung, which was founded in 1964 by Hermann Kunst, a good friend of Aland. Many important figures within politics and economics participated in the sponsorship of the Institute for New Testament Textual Research.

Another priority in his life was church history, being concerned with the early church, the Reformation, and movements such as pietism and revivalism.

Aland received critical acclaim for his profundity and comprehensive knowledge of the textual sources for the New Testament. His contemporary presence is relevant, having contributed to modern scientific methodology. Aland was of the opinion that every work within historical research stands on its adherence to reliability and accessibility.

The archives (Nachlass) of Kurt Aland are held in the University Archives of the University of Münster, Germany.

== Honors ==
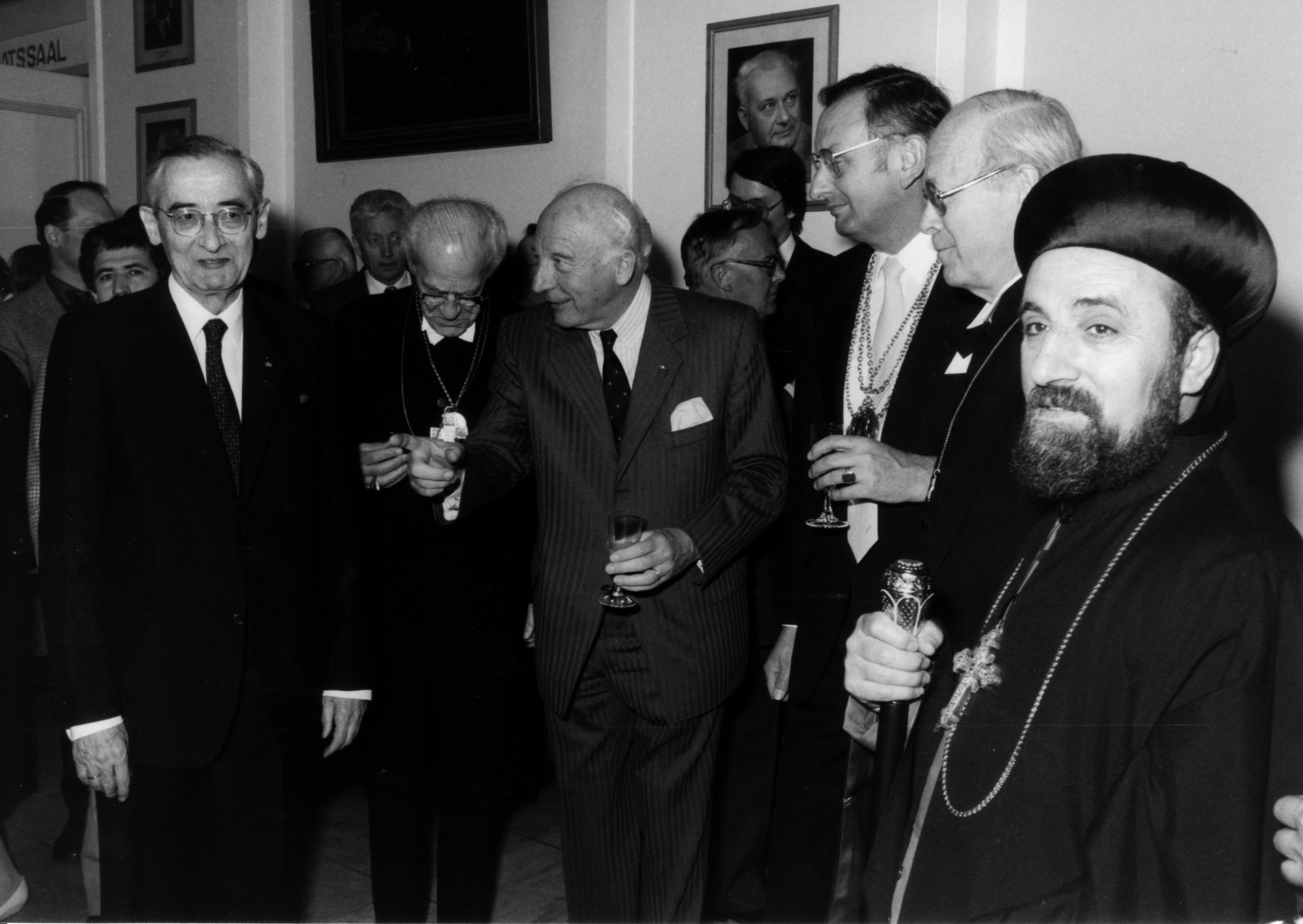
Kurt Aland's 70th Birthday from left to right: Kurt Aland, Hermann Kunst, President of Germany Walter Scheel, Wilfried Schlüter, Eduard Lohse, Archbishop Mor Julius Yeshu Cicek

Kurt Aland achieved the following honorary doctorates:

- 1950: "Dr. (h.c.)", from University of Göttingen (Germany)
- 1957: "Doctor of Divinity", from University of St Andrews (Scotland)
- 1971: "Doctor of Literature", from Wartburg College (Iowa)

He received the following awards:

- 1963: Golden "Cross of Athos" of the patriarchate of Alexandria
- 1975: "Burkitt Medal" for Biblical Studies by the British Academy
- 1976: Grant Cross of Merit, neck cross (Großes Verdienstkreuz)
- 1983: Grant Cross of Merit with star (Großes Verdienstkreuz mit Stern)
- 1985: "Luther-Medal" from the University of Halle-Wittenberg
- 1985: "Canstein-Medal" from the German Bible Society
- 1994: "St. Paul's Biglerville Prize" from the Lutheran Historical Society of the Mid-Atlantic

Kurt Aland was a member of the following academies:

- since 1955: Saxonian Academy of Sciences and Humanities (Germany)
- since 1969: British Academy
- since 1975: Academy of Science of Göttingen (Germany)
- since 1976: Royal Netherlands Academy of Arts and Sciences

Festschriften:

- Text – Wort – Glaube in Honour of Kurt Aland, ed. Martin Brecht (De Gruyter, Berlin, New York, 1980, ISBN 3-11-007318-8)
- Grundlagen der Apologetik: Kurt Aland zum 70. Geburtstag, published by "Arbeitsgemeinschaft für Religions- und Weltanschauungsfragen" (Munich, 1985, ISBN 3-921513-68-5)
- Supplementa zu den Neutestamentlichen und den Kirchengeschichtlichen Entwürfen in Honour of Kurt Aland presented to his 75th birthday, ed. Beate Köster, Hans-Udo Rosenbaum, Michael Welte (De Gruyter, Berlin, New York, 1990, ISBN 3110121425, 9783110121421)

The American Society of Biblical Literature elected him an Honorary Member. Furthermore, Aland was elected an Honorary Life Member in 1966 by the American Bible Society.

== Works ==
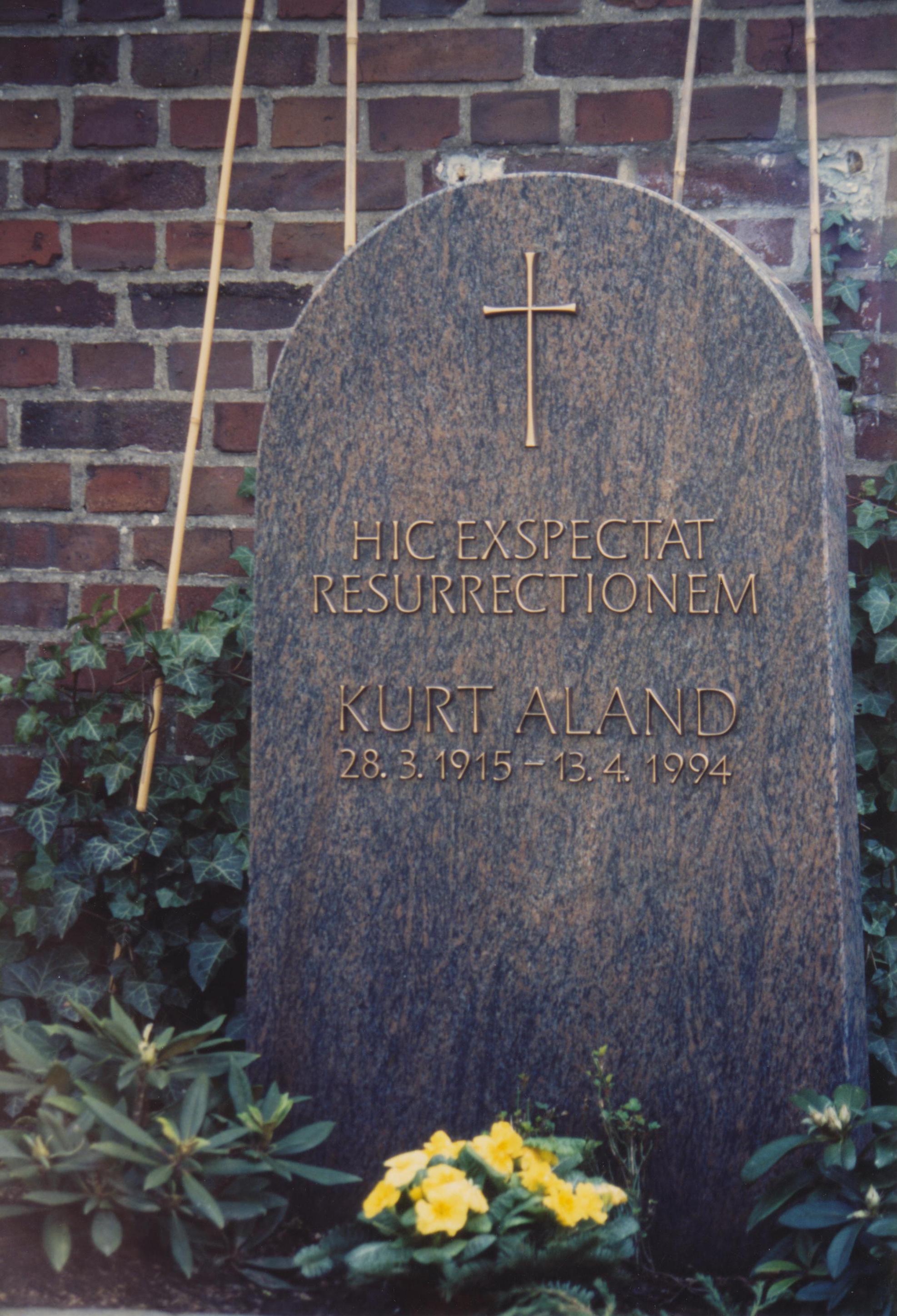
The grave of Kurt Aland on the Central Cemetery Münster, Germany.

Kurt Aland wrote and published numerous books and articles in magazines; his bibliography lists 477 publications. Therefore, the following list provides only an excerpt of his work.

=== Books translated or written in English ===
- Greek New Testament by Kurt and Barbara Aland (and others), German Bible Society; 5 revised ed. (August 2014); ISBN 978-1-61970139-7
- Novum Testamentum Graece – Nestle–Aland by Kurt and Barbara Aland (and others), German Bible Society; 28 Rev Blg ed. (1 December 2012), ISBN 978-1-61970046-8
- Synopsis of the Four Gospels edited by Kurt Aland, United Bible Societies, 1985, ISBN 978-0-82670500-6
- Aland, Kurt (9 February 2004) [1963; Die Sauglingstaufe im Neuen Testament und in der alten Kirche, 1961], Did the Early Church Baptize Infants?, Wipf & Stock, ISBN 978-1-59244541-7.
- ———; Aland, Barbara (1987), The Text of the New Testament: An Introduction to the Critical Editions and to the Theory and Practice of Modern Textual Criticism, ISBN 978-0-80284098-1.
- Catholic Letters: Text and Suppliementary Material (Editio Critica Maior: Novum Testamentum Graece) by Kurt and Barbara Aland (and others), German Bible Society; Rev Mul ed. (October 2013), ISBN 978-1-61970045-1
- A History of Christianity: From the Beginnings to the Threshold of the Reformation (History of Christianity) (Volume 1) by Kurt Aland, Fortress Pr (February 1985), ISBN 978-0-80060725-8
- A History of Christianity: From the Reformation to the Present (Volume 2) by Kurt Aland, Fortress Pr (September 1986), ISBN 978-0-80060759-3
- New Testament Textual Criticism, Exegesis and Church History A Discussion of Methods (Contributions to Biblical Exegesis & Theology) by Kurt Aland and J Delobel, Peeters (1 January 1994), ISBN 978-903900105-9
- Four reformers: Luther, Melanchthon, Calvin, Zwingli by Kurt Aland, Augsburg Pub. House (1979), ISBN 978-0-80661709-1
- Martin Luther's 95 Theses by Kurt Aland, Concordia Publishing (30 December 2004), ISBN 978-0-75860844-4
- The correspondence of Heinrich Melchior Mühlenberg by Kurt Aland, Camden, Maine : Picton Press, c. 1986, 1993
- Saints and Sinners – Men and Ideas in the Early Church by Kurt Aland, Fortress Press (1970), ASIN B0006CPJSU
- A Textual Commentary on the Greek New Testament. A Companion Volume to the United Bible Societies Greek New Testament (3. ed.) by B. M. Metzger and the Editorial Committee of the United Bible Societies Greek New Testament (K. Aland, M. Black, C. M. Martini, B. M. Metzger and Allen Wikgren), 1971;
- The New Testament : Ancient Greek with Today's English Version by Kurt Aland, Matthew Black, Bruce Metzger and Allen Wikgren, American Bible Society (1966), ASIN B002ULOMFG.

=== Books in German language ===
- Spener-Studien, 1943, (= Arbeiten zur Geschichte des Pietismus I. Arbeiten zur Kirchengeschichte vol. 28);
- Kirchengeschichtliche Entwürfe: Alte Kirche – Reformation und Luthertum – Pietismus und Erweckungsbewegung, 1960.
- Die Säuglingstaufe im Neuen Testament und in der alten Kirche. Eine Antwort an Joachim Jeremias, (= TEH; N.F. 86), 1961; Über den Glaubenswechsel in der Geschichte des Christentums, 1961;
- "Bibel und Bibeltexte bei August Hermann Francke und Johann Albrecht Bengel". In: Pietismus und Bibel, (= AGP; 9), 1970, 89–147;
- Taufe und Kindertaufe. 40 Sätze zur Aussage des Neuen Testaments und dem historischen Befund, zur modernen Debatte darüber und den Folgerungen daraus für die kirchliche Praxis – zugleich eine Auseinandersetzung mit Karl Barths Lehre von der Taufe, 1971;
- Neutestamentliche Entwürfe, (= Theol. Bücherei, NT; 63), 1979;
- Der Text des Neuen Testaments. Einführung in die wissenschaftlichen Ausgaben sowie in Theorie und Praxis der modernen Textkritik (with Barbara Aland), 1982, 1989; English translation
- Die Grundurkunde des Glaubens. Ein Bericht über 40 Jahre Arbeit an ihrem Text. Em: Bericht der Hermann Kunst- Stiftung zur Förderung der Neutestamentlichen Textforschung für die Jahre 1982 bis 1984, 1985, 9–75;
- Das Neue Testament – zuverlässig überliefert. Die Geschichte des neutestamentlichen Textes und die Ergebnisse der modernen Textforschung, (= Wissenswertes zur Bibel; 4), 1986;
- Text und Textwert der griechischen Handschriften des Neuen Testaments, vol. I-III (= Arbeiten zur neutestamentlichen Textforschung), 1987 ff.;

== See also ==
- Institute for New Testament Textual Research
- Categories of New Testament manuscripts
- International Greek New Testament Project
