= WPBC (disambiguation) =

WPBC, now WWWE (AM), is a radio station (1310 AM) licensed to serve Decatur, Georgia, United States, which held the call sign WPBC from 1998 to 2017.

WPBC may also refer to:

- Wealthy Park Baptist Church, a fundamentalist church in Michigan
- Western Pentecostal Bible College, an undergraduate seminary
- Weymouth and Portland Borough Council, a local government borough council in Dorset, England
- Winsted Precision Ball Company, a subsidiary of Barden Corporation
- World Pipe Band Championships, a pipe band competition held at Glasgow Green, Glasgow, Scotland.
- WPBC-FM, a radio station in the Twin Cities region of Minnesota
