= Cornerstone Theological Seminary =

Seminary

Coordinates: 42°58′57.8″N 85°35′48.6″W

- Type: Private seminary
- Established: 1948
- Parent institution: Cornerstone University
- Religious affiliation: Interdenominational (Evangelical Christian)
- President: Gerson Moreno-Riaño
- Postgraduates: 4300
- Location: Grand Rapids, MI, United States
- Campus: Urban
- Website: www.cornerstone.edu/academics/schools-departments/cornerstone-theological-seminary/

Cornerstone Theological Seminary (formerly Grand Rapids Theological Seminary) is the evangelical Christian seminary of Cornerstone University in Grand Rapids, Michigan.

== History ==
Cornerstone Theological Seminary had its beginnings as an evening Bible institute at Wealthy Street Baptist Church in 1941. David Otis Fuller who was elected pastor of Wealthy Street Baptist Church on November 4, 1934; became one of the founders of Cornerstone University and Grand Rapids Theological Seminary. David Fuller organized a meeting of the committee of the Organization of the Baptist Bible Institute in October 1940. January 1941 the school was organized with ten part time instructors and David Otis Fuller serving as President of the Executive Council. David Fuller was a popular evangelist with his program being featured on 600 radio stations globally. The Bible institute became a degree granting institution in 1963 and moved to its present location in 1964. Grand Rapids Bible College and Seminary which were precursors to Cornerstone University and Cornerstone Theological Seminary were bastions of conservative fundamentalism due to David O Fuller vision to parallel the institutions to align with conservative wealthy street Baptist church. The institution became a Christian liberal arts college in 1972 and became a state-approved university in 1999. Today Cornerstone University and Cornerstone Theological Seminary share a 123-acre (0.50 km^{2}) campus four miles (6 km) east of downtown Grand Rapids, Michigan. The campus currently supports the undergraduate college, with programs for traditional students as well as accelerated degree programs, graduate programs including Cornerstone Theological Seminary and Asia Baptist Theological Seminary based in Thailand, and Cornerstone University Radio (WCSG and Mission Network News).

CTS is an accredited member of the Association of Theological Schools in the United States and Canada, The Higher Learning Commission of the North Central Association of Colleges and Schools, and is authorized by the Michigan State Board of Education to grant advanced theological degrees.

== Degree programs ==
Cornerstone Theological Seminary offers a Master of Divinity degree, along with 3 Master of Arts programs, and 2 Master of Theology programs both residentially and online.
