= List of New Testament verses not included in modern English translations =

New Testament verses not included in modern English translations are verses of the New Testament that exist in older translations (primarily the King James Version), but do not appear or have been relegated to footnotes in later translations of not only English, but other languages as well. Scholars have generally regarded these verses as later additions to the original text, based on the study of ancient Greek manuscripts and earlier translations into other languages such as Armenian, Christian Palestinian Aramaic, Coptic, Ethiopic, Georgian, Gothic, Latin, Slavonic, and Syriac.

Although many lists of missing verses specifically name the New International Version as the version that omits them, these same verses are missing from the main text (and mostly relegated to footnotes) in the Revised Version of 1881 (RV), the American Standard Version of 1901, the Revised Standard Version of 1947 (RSV), the Today's English Version (the Good News Bible) of 1966, and many others released since the 1970s. Lists of "missing" verses and phrases go back to the Revised Version and to the Revised Standard Version, without waiting for the appearance of the NIV (1973). Some of these lists of "missing verses" specifically mention "sixteen verses" – although the lists are not all the same.

The citations of manuscript authority use the designations popularized in the catalog of Caspar René Gregory, and used in such resources (which are also used in the remainder of this article) as Souter, Nestle-Aland, and the UBS Greek New Testament (which gives particular attention to "problem" verses such as these). Some Greek editions published well before the 1881 Revised Version made similar omissions.

Editors who exclude these passages say these decisions are motivated solely by evidence as to whether the passage was in the original New Testament or had been added later. The sentiment was articulated (but not originated) by what Rev. Samuel T. Bloomfield wrote in 1832: "Surely, nothing dubious ought to be admitted into 'the sure word' of 'The Book of Life'." The King James Only movement, which believes that only the King James Version (KJV) of the Bible (1611) in English is the true word of God, has sharply criticized these translations for the omitted verses.

In most instances another verse, found elsewhere in the New Testament and remaining in modern versions, is very similar to the verse that was omitted because of its doubtful provenance.

== The sixteen omitted verses ==
=== Matthew 17:21 ===
- KJV: "Howbeit this kind goeth not out but by prayer and fasting."
- Reason: The verse closely resembles Mark 9:29, but it is lacking in Matthew in Codex Sinaiticus (original handwriting), Codex Vaticanus, Codex Koridethi, and some Italic, Syriac, Coptic, and Ethiopic manuscripts. It is, however, found in this place in some Greek manuscripts not quite so ancient – Codex Ephraemi Rescriptus, Codex Bezae, Codex Cyprius, and Codex Regius – as well as some other manuscripts of the ancient versions. It is believed to have been assimilated from Mark.

=== Matthew 18:11 ===
- KJV: "For the Son of man is come to save that which was lost."
- Reason: This verse is lacking in Codex Sinaiticus, Codex Vaticanus, Codex Regius (original handwriting), Codex Koridethi, Family 1, Family 13, some old Italic, Syriac, Coptic and Georgian manuscripts, and such ancient witnesses as the Apostolic Canons, Eusebius, Jerome, and others. It is found in some other sources, not quite so ancient, such as Codex Bezae, Codex Cyprius, Codex Washingtonianus, Codex Monacensis, and the Latin Vulgate. It is not found in any manuscript before the 5th century. According to biblical scholar Bruce Metzger, "There can be little doubt that the words [...] are spurious here, being omitted by the earliest witnesses representing several textual types... [This verse was] manifestly borrowed by copyists from Luke 19:10."

=== Matthew 23:14 ===
- KJV: "Woe unto you, scribes and Pharisees, hypocrites! for ye devour widows' houses, and for a pretence make long prayer: therefore ye shall receive the greater damnation."
- Reason: This verse is very similar to Mark 12:40 and Luke 20:47. This verse is lacking altogether in Codex Sinaiticus, Codex Vaticanus, Codex Bezae, Codex Regius, Codex Dublinensis, Codex Koridethi, Family 1, Ethiopic, Armenian, several Italic, Syrian, and Coptic manuscripts, and the writings of several early Church Fathers. It appears before verse 13 in Codex Cyprius, Codex Washingtonianus, and several New Testament minuscules. It appears after verse 13 in Family 13, and some Italic, Syriac, and Coptic manuscripts. The fact that it is absent from the most ancient sources of multiple text types and that the sources that do contain the verse disagree about its placement, as well as the fact that it is a repetition of verses found elsewhere, show "that verse 14 is an interpolation derived from the parallel in Mark 12:40 or Luke 20:47".

=== Mark 7:16 ===
- KJV: "If any man have ears to hear, let him hear."
- Reason: This verse is nearly identical with verses 4:9 and 4:23. This verse here is lacking in Codex Sinaiticus, Codex Vaticanus, Codex Regius, Codex Sangallensis (original handwriting), and some Coptic manuscripts. It is included in manuscripts only slightly less ancient, Codex Alexandrinus, Codex Bezae, Codex Cyprius, Codex Washingtonianus, Family 1, Family 13, some Italic manuscripts, the Latin Vulgate, and some other ancient versions. As it is missing in the very oldest resources and yet is identical to verses that remain, many editors seem confident in omitting its appearance here.

=== Mark 9:44 and 9:46 ===
- KJV: "Where their worm dieth not, and the fire is not quenched." (The verses are identical to each other, and to 9:48, which is still in the main text)
- Reason: Both verses 44 and 46 are duplicates of verse 48, which remains in the text. Verses 44 and 46 are both lacking in Codex Sinaiticus, Codex Vaticanus, Codex Ephraemi Rescriptus, Codex Regius, Codex Washingtonianus, Family 1, and some manuscripts of the ancient versions, but appear in somewhat later sources such as Codex Alexandrinus, Codex Bezae, Codex Cyprius, Codex Koridethi, some Italic manuscripts and the Latin Vulgate. It is possible that verse 48 was repeated by a copyist as an epistrophe, for an oratorical flourish. The UBS text assigns this omission a confidence rating of A.

=== Mark 11:26 ===
- KJV: "But if ye do not forgive, neither will your Father which is in heaven forgive your trespasses."
- Reason: This verse is very similar to Matthew 6:15. This verse appeared in the Complutensian Polyglot and most Textus Receptus editions but Erasmus omitted it and noted that it was missing from 'most' Greek manuscripts. The verse is not in Codex Sinaiticus, Codex Vaticanus, Codex Regius, Codex Washingtonianus, Codex Sangallensis, Codex Athous Lavrensis, some Italic, Vulgate, Syriac, and Coptic manuscripts, and the Armenian and Georgian versions. The UBS edition gave the omission of this verse a confidence rating of A.

=== Mark 15:28 ===
- KJV: "And the scripture was fulfilled, which saith, "And he was numbered with the transgressors.""
- Reasons: This verse is similar to Luke 22:37. It does not appear here in any New Testament manuscript prior to the end of the 6th century.

=== Luke 17:36 ===
- KJV: "Two men shall be in the field; the one shall be taken, and the other left."
- Reason: It is possible that this verse is a repetition of Matthew 24:40. Even the King James Version had doubts about this verse, as it provided (in the original 1611 edition and still in many high-quality editions) a sidenote that said, "This 36th verse is wanting in most of the Greek copies." This verse is missing from Tyndale's version (1534) and the Geneva Bible (1557). Among major Textus Receptus editions, this verse does not appear in the editions of Erasmus (1516–1535), Aldus (1518), Colinaeus (1534), Stephanus 1st–3rd editions (1546–1550), but it did appear in the Complutensian (1514), the margins of Stephanus' 4th edition (1551), and all of Elzivir's and Beza's editions (1565–1604). In modern conservative Greek editions it is also omitted from the main text of biblical scholar Frederick H. A. Scrivener's Greek NT according to the Textus Receptus, and the two Majority Text editions. Verse 36 is included by very few Greek manuscripts of the Western text-type and by Old-Latin and Vulgate manuscripts.

=== John 5:3b–4 ===
- KJV: "^{3}[...] waiting for the moving of the water. ^{4}For an Angel went down at a certain season into the pool, and troubled the water: whosoever then first after the troubling of the water stepped in was made whole of whatsoever disease he had." (Not only is verse 4 omitted, but also the tail end of verse 3.)
- Reason: It is considered unlikely that these words were in the original text of the Gospel. They are lacking in the "earliest and best witnesses", and several ancient Greek manuscripts that do contain them enclose them with markings indicating doubts about their authenticity, the passage contains words or expressions that appear nowhere else in John (such as the Greek words for "at a certain season [meaning occasionally]" and "stirring" and "diseases"), and the manuscripts that contain this verse differ among themselves as to the wording. The UBS text gave the omission of this verse a confidence rating of A. This verse was omitted from Edward Harwood's Greek NT (1776), marked as doubtful in Griesbach's editions (1777), and thereafter generally relegated to a footnote, enclosed in brackets, or omitted completely.
  Henry Alford wrote, "The spuriousness of this controverted passage can hardly be questioned." Without the words at issue the context simply states that a swimming or bathing pool in or near Jerusalem was a gathering place for sick and crippled people, some of whom sought to get into the pool (either for physical comfort or for ritual cleansing) and it was there that Jesus performed miraculous healing. However, the words quoted above complicate this story by asserting that miraculous cures were already taking place at this pool in the absence of Jesus, owing to the unpredictable intervention of an (apparently invisible) angel. This passage in John 5 is the only mention of this pool – no such miraculous pool is mentioned in Josephus or other histories. The words in question do not appear in the oldest manuscripts, and in those manuscripts that contain them they are sometimes marked as doubtful, and differ from manuscript to manuscript "with that extreme variation in the reading which so often indicates grounds for suspicion".
  The italicized words do not appear at all in Papyrus 66, Papyrus 75, Codex Sinaiticus, Codex Alexandrinus (original hand), Codex Vaticanus, Codex Ephraemi Rescriptus (original hand), Codex Regius, and some Italic, Syriac, Coptic, and Latin Vulgate manuscripts, and in quotations of the story by several early Greek Fathers. Verse 4 ("For an angel ...") appears but without the concluding words of verse 3 ("waiting for the stirring of the water ...") in Codex Alexandrinus (where it says the angel "bathed in the water" rather than "descended into the water"), Codex Regius, Minuscule 18 (14th century), and an Egyptian manuscript. The concluding words of verse 3 but not any of verse 4 appear in Codex Bezae, Minuscule 33 (9th century), and some Latin manuscripts. The entire italicized passage appears in Codex Ephraemi Rescriptus (third hand), Codex Cyprius (also with the angel "bathed in the water"), Codex Sangallensis, Codex Koridethi, Codex Athous Lavrensis, and numerous other manuscripts, and some Italic, Syriac, Coptic, and Armenian manuscripts, and several Latin Fathers. Some manuscripts – Codex Vaticanus 354, Codex Tischendorfianus III, Codex Petropolitanus, and a few others – contain the words enclosed by marks of doubt. Among the manuscripts that contain this sentence-and-a-half, there are many variations and permutations.
  The Revised Version (1881) omitted the italicized words from its main text, making the passage read: "... a multitude of them that were sick, blind, halt, withered. ^{5}And a certain man was there ...", and as a side-note, "Many ancient authorities insert, wholly or in part," and here present the italicized words exactly as they appeared in the KJV. Several modern versions similarly relegate those words to a footnote, and some others (such as Moffatt) include the words in the main text but are enclosed in brackets with an explanation in a footnote.

=== Acts 8:37 ===
- KJV: "And Philip said, If thou believest with all thine heart, thou mayest. And he answered and said, I believe that Jesus Christ is the Son of God."
- Modern versions: Either sidelined to a footnote (e.g., ESV, RV, RSV, NRSV, NIV, Hodges & Farstad Majority Text) or omitted altogether (e.g., Moffatt, Goodspeed, Schonfield, Robinson & Pierpont Majority Text).
- Reason: The earliest Greek manuscript of the New Testament to include this verse, Codex Laudianus dates from the late 6th or early 7th century and it is only found in Western witnesses to the text with many minor variations. The majority of Greek manuscripts copied after 600 AD and the majority of translations made after 600 AD do not include the verse. The tradition of the confession was current in the time of Irenaeus as it is cited by him (c. 180) and Cyprian (c. 250)
  This verse appears in Codex Laudianus (specifically, a portion consisting of Acts, dated to the 6th century) and several cursives dating after the 9th century (showing many variants), "manuscripts of good character, but quite inadequate to prove the authenticity of the verse," according to F.H.A. Scrivener. This verse was not found in the Syriac Peshitta, with the result that a printed edition of the Peshitta inserted the verse translated into Syriac by the editors, It is similarly missing from Papyrus 45, Papyrus 74, Codex Sinaiticus, Codex Alexandrinus, Codex Vaticanus, Codex Ephraemi Rescriptus, Codex Porphyrianus, Codex Athous Lavrensis, and a multitude of other codices and cursives. Its omission has a UBS confidence rating of A. However, as Kurt Aland noted, "The external evidence [for the inclusion of this verse] is so weak that the Nestle apparatus cited only the support for insertion and not for the original omission... The voice which speaks in Acts 8:37 is from a later age, with an interest in the detailed justification of the [Ethiopian] treasurerer's desire for baptism." It was omitted in the Complutensian edition, and included in Erasmus's editions only because he found it as a late note in the margin of a secondary manuscript and, from Erasmus, it found its way into other Textus Receptus editions and then the KJV. As Scrivener said, "We cannot safely question the spuriousness of this verse, which all the critical editors condemn."
  "For although in the Acts of the Apostles the eunuch is described as at once baptized by Philip, because "he believed with his whole heart," this is not a fair parallel. For he was a Jew, and as he came from the temple of the Lord he was reading the prophet Isaiah," (Cyprian) and is found in the Old Latin (2nd/3rd century) and the Vulgate (380–400). In his notes Erasmus says that he took this reading from the margin of Minuscule 2816 (15th century) and incorporated it into the Textus Receptus. J. A. Alexander (1857) suggested that this verse, though genuine, was omitted by many scribes, "as unfriendly to the practice of delaying baptism, which had become common, if not prevalent, before the end of the 3rd century."

=== Acts 15:34 ===
- KJV: "Notwithstanding it pleased Silas to abide there still."
- Reason: Although this verse, or something similar to it, is quite old, it does not appear in the oldest manuscripts, and the manuscripts that do contain it are inconsistent about its text. It does not appear at all in Codex Sinaiticus, Codex Alexandrinus, Codex Vaticanus, Codex Laudianus, Codex Angelicus, Codex Porphyrianus, Codex Athous Lavrensis, some Italic, Syriac, Coptic, and Slavonic manuscripts, or the best manuscripts of the Latin Vulgate, and other versions, and quotations of this paragraph in Chrysostom.
  The verse as it appears in the KJV is found in less ancient Greek manuscripts (cursives, after the 9th century) and some Italic, Syriac, Coptic, Armenian, Ethiopic, and other versions. However some other, equally old resources, such as Codex Ephraemi Rescriptus, and several cursives, change one word to make the verse read, "Notwithstanding it pleased Silas that they should abide there still."
  Several other sources, such as Codex Bezae and some Italic manuscripts, extend the verse with the ending, "and Judas traveled alone"; and a couple of Italic and Latin manuscripts add to that, "to Jerusalem." Erasmus annotated this verse with the comment that the reference to Judas did not appear in any Greek manuscript known to him.
  As F.H.A. Scrivener put it, "No doubt this verse is an unauthorised addition, self-condemned indeed by its numerous variations. [...] [It must have begun as] a marginal gloss, designed to explain how [...] Silas was at hand in verse 40, conveniently for Saint Paul to choose him as a companion in travel.
  This verse was omitted from the Revised Version and most modern versions, but many versions include it in a footnote.

=== Acts 24:6–8 ===
- KJV: "^{6}Who also hath gone about to profane the temple: whom we took, and would have judged according to our law. ^{7}But the chief captain Lysias came upon us, and with great violence took him away out of our hands, ^{8}Commanding his accusers to come unto thee: by examining of whom thyself mayest take knowledge of all these things, whereof we accuse him." (Only verse 7 is omitted entirely, as well as the beginning of verse 6 and most of verse 8.)
- Modern versions (RV): "^{6}Who moreover assayed to profane the temple; on whom we also laid hold; ^{8}from whom thou wilt be able, by examining him thyself, to take knowledge of all these things, whereof we accuse him."
- Reason: These words are not found in the oldest sources – Papyrus 74, Codex Sinaiticus, Codex Alexandrinus, Codex Vaticanus, Codex Porphyrianus, several minuscules, some manuscripts of the Italic, Vulgate, Coptic, and Georgian versions. The words are found in sources not quite as old – Codex Laudianus, Codex Athous Lavrensis, some minuscules (with many variants), some Italic manuscripts, and the Armenian and Ethiopic versions. The absence of these words from the earliest resources, and the several variations in the resources in which they appear, made their exclusion probable but not a certainty (the UBS assigned the omission a confidence rating of only D). While verse 7 is omitted in its entirety, parts of verse 6 and verse 8 are also omitted.

=== Acts 28:29 ===
- KJV: "And when he had said these words, the Jews departed, and had great reasoning among themselves."
- Modern versions (RV): (verse omitted from main text, in footnote with comment, "Some ancient authorities insert verse 29")
- Reason: This verse is lacking in the oldest sources – Papyrus 74, Codex Sinaiticus, Codex Alexandrinus, Codex Vaticanus, Codex Laudianus, Codex Athous Lavrensis, several minuscules, some Italic, Vulgate, Syriac, Ethiopic, and Coptic manuscripts, and the Armenian and Georgian versions. They appear only in later sources such as Codex Porphyrianus (9th century) and several minuscules, and a smattering of Italic manuscripts. The UBS gave the omission of this verse a confidence rating of B. Erasmus of Rotterdam, in working up the very first printed Greek New Testament from a multitude of manuscripts, included this note for this verse: "I did not find the words in several old manuscripts."

=== Romans 16:24 ===
- KJV: "The grace of our Lord Jesus Christ be with you all. Amen."
- Modern versions (RV): (omitted from main text, in footnote)
- Reason: This verse occurs twice in the KJV in this chapter; once as the conclusion to verse 20 and again as verse 24, which is the occurrence omitted from modern versions. The first occurrence (as part of verse 20) is very well supported by ancient resources, including Papyrus 46, Codex Sinaiticus, Codex Alexandrinus, Codex Vaticanus, Codex Ephraemi Rescriptus, Codex Porphyrianus, Codex Athous Lavrensis, and several ancient versions (although some omit 'Christ' and some omit 'Amen'); its inclusion in verse 20 got a UBS confidence rating of B. However, its recurrence as verse 24 is not so well supported. It does not occur after verse 23 in Papyrus 46, Papyrus 61, Codex Sinaiticus, Codex Alexandrinus, Codex Vaticanus, Codex Ephraemi Rescriptus, several minuscules and some other sources; it does appear in Codex Bezae, Codex Boernerianus, Codex Athous Lavrensis, Minuscule 629 (although Boernerianus, Athous Lavrensis, and 629 —and both leading compilations of the so-called Majority Text — end the Epistle with this verse and do not follow it with verses 25–27) and several later minuscules; Codex Porphyrianus and some minuscules do not have it as verse 24 but move it to the very end of the Epistle, after verse 27. Westcott and Hort said of the recurrence as verse 24, "This last combination, which rests on hardly any authority, and is due to late conflation, was adopted by Erasmus from the Latin and is preserved in the 'Received Text'." The verses immediately before verse 24, the verse 24 itself, and the verses following verse 24 show many variations in the surviving manuscripts. An abbreviated history of the passage is that the conclusion of the Epistle to the Romans was known in several different versions: about the year 144, Marcion made radical changes in the ending of the Epistle to the Romans, breaking it off with chapter 14. At about the same time someone else made in other manuscripts the addition of verses 16:24 and 16:25–27. despite the existence of a concluding benediction at 16:20 (whose purpose was obscured by the greetings appended at 16:21–23). This resulted in a proliferation of readings (at least 15 different permutations among the surviving resources). Because of its absence from the oldest sources and the confusion about its appearance in several of the sources containing it, its omission after verse 23 got a UBS confidence rating of B.

=== 1 John 5:7–8 ===
- KJV: "^{7}For there are three that bear record in heaven, the Father, the Word, and the holy Ghost, and these three are one. ^{8}And there are three that bear witness in earth, ..."
- Modern versions: (omitted from main text and not in a footnote)
- Reason: A multitude of books have been devoted to just this verse, including A Vindication of I John V, 7 from the Objections of M. Griesbach [by Thomas Burgess] (1821, London); Das Comma Ioanneum: Auf Seine Herkunft Untersucht [The Johannine Comma, an examination of its origin] by Karl Künstle (1905, Frieburg, Switz.); An Historical Account of Two Notable Corruptions of Scripture by Sir Isaac Newton (published posthumously 1785); Letters to Mr. Archdeacon [George] Travis in answer to his Defence of the Three Heavenly Witnesses by Richard Porson (1790, London); A New Plea for the Authenticity of the Text of the Three Heavenly Witnesses or Porson's Letters to Travis Eclectically Examined by Rev. Charles Forster (1867, London), Memoir of The Controversy respecting the Three Heavenly Witnesses, I John V.7 ˈ by 'Criticus' [Rev. William Orme] (1830, London), reprinted (1872, Boston, "a new edition, with notes and an appendix by Ezra Abbot" ); and The Three Witnesses – the disputed text in St. John, considerations new and old by Henry T. Armfield (1893, London). Eberhard Nestle, writing in Germany at the end of 19th century, said, "The fact that it [the Comma Johanneum] is still defended even from the Protestant side is interesting only from a pathological point of view." Scrivener, usually regarded as a defender of the KJV text, said of this verse, "The authenticity of [this verse] will, perhaps, no longer be maintained by anyone whose judgment ought to have weight; but this result has been arrived at after a long and memorable controversy, which helped keep alive, especially in England, some interest in Biblical studies." The UBS gives this omission a confidence rating of A.

Early Church Fathers did not mention this verse, even when gathering verses to support the Doctrine of the Trinity. This verse first appears unambigiously, not in a New Testament manuscript, but in Priscillian's Liber Apologeticus, and after that it was assimilated into manuscripts of the Latin Vulgate, but it was (because of the lack of Greek documentary support) omitted from the first two "Textus Receptus" printed editions of the New Testament (namely those edited by Erasmus, 1516 and 1519), as well as some other very early Textus Receptus editions, such as Aldus 1518, Gerbelius 1521, Cephalius 1524 and 1526, and Colinaeus 1534. Stephanus (Robert Estienne), in his influential Editio Regia of 1550 (which was the model edition of the Textus Receptus in England), was the first to provide an apparatus showing variant readings and showed this verse was lacking in seven Greek manuscripts. The first appearance of the Comma in the main text of a Greek New Testament manuscript is no earlier than the 15th century.
Doubts about its genuineness were indicated in printed Greek New Testaments as early as that of the first two editions (1515 and 1519) of Erasmus of Rotterdam, who simply left the verse out because he could not find a Greek manuscript containing it, providing a comment that "this is all I find in the Greek manuscripts". Expressions of doubt also appeared in the edition of Stephen Courcelles (Étienne de Courcelles), in 1658, and from Johann Jakob Griesbach's edition of 1775. Most critical editions relegated the Comma to a footnote or otherwise marked it as doubtful. The American Bible Union, a Baptist organization, omitted this verse from the new English translation of the New Testament it published in 1865. The Roman Catholic Church was slightly more resistant about yielding up this verse; an 1897 decision of the Holy Inquisition forbade a Catholic "to deny or even express doubt about the authenticity of" the Johannine Comma, but this was effectively reversed by a declaration of the Holy Office on June 2, 1927, which allowed scholars to express doubts and even denials of the genuineness of the Comma, tempered by the fact that the Vatican would have the final authority. The 1966 Jerusalem Bible omits the Comma without a footnote. The spurious nature of this verse is so notorious that even the Revised Version of 1881 did not bother to include nor provide a footnote for this verse, and many other modern versions do likewise. Ezra Abbot wrote, "It may be said that the question [of excluding this verse] is obsolete; that the spuriousness of the disputed passage had long been conceded by all intelligent and fair-minded scholars. This is true, but a little investigation will show that great ignorance still exists on the subject among the less-informed in the Christian community." Even the two leading editions of the so-called Majority Text (Robinson & Pierpont, and Hodges & Farstad) omit this verse (the Hodges & Farstad edition acknowledge the 'Textus Receptus' version of this verse in a footnote).

== Other omitted verses ==
=== Matthew 20:16 (b) ===
- KJV: "^{16}[...] for many be called, but few chosen."
- Modern versions (RV): (omitted without a footnote).
- Reason: These familiar words are not in Codex Sinaiticus, Codex Vaticanus, Codex Regius, Codex Dublinensis, several cursives, Sahidic, and some Boharic and Ethiopic manuscripts, but appear in slightly more recent manuscripts such as Codex Ephraemi Rescriptus, Codex Bezae, Codex Washingtonianus, Codex Koridethi, and Latin manuscripts. Tischendorff's 1841 Greek NT was reportedly the first printed edition to omit this clause. The same words appear in Matthew 22:14.

=== Mark 6:11 (b) ===
- KJV: "^{11}And whosoever shall not receive you, nor hear you, when ye depart thence, shake off the dust under your feet for a testimony against them. Verily I say unto you, It shall be more tolerable for Sodom and Gomorrah in the Day of Judgement, than for that city. ^{12}And they went out, and preached that men should repent."
- RV: (omits second sentence of verse 11).
- Reason: Many (perhaps most) modern versions emulate the Revised Version and simply omit the sentence in question, without any explanatory comment. This is a complete sentence and yet it did not receive, in the Textus Receptus editions, a verse number of its own. It does not appear here in the majority of important codices, such as Codex Sinaiticus, Codex Vaticanus, Codex Ephraemi Rescriptus, Codex Bezae, Codex Regius, Codex Washingtonianus, Codex Sangallensis, Codex Koridethi, and Latin, Sahidic, and some Syriac and Boharic manuscripts. It does, however, appear in some significant manuscripts, including Family 1, Family 13, Codex Alexandrinus, two very old Latin manuscripts, and some Syriac and Boharic manuscripts, and with slight differences in Minuscule 33 (9th century). It was already doubted even before the KJV; this sentence does not appear in Wycliff (1380), the Bishops' Bible (1568), and the Rheims (1582). Westcott and Hort omitted it and did not even mention it in their Appendix volume, nor is it mentioned in Scrivener's Plain Introduction to Criticism of the New Testament, nor is it mentioned in Metzger's Commentary, nor does it get even a footnote in the Souter or UBS Greek New Testament. Henry Alford's edition of the New Testament includes this sentence in the main text, but bracketed and italicized, with the brief footnote: "omitted in most ancient authorities: probably inserted here from Matthew 10:15." The same two sentences do appear, without any quibbling about their authenticity, in Matthew 10:14–15, and it is plausible that some very early copyist assimilated the sentence into Mark, perhaps as a sidenote subsequently copied into the main text. In any case, its omission from Mark 6:11 does not affect its unchallenged presence in Matthew 10:15.

=== Luke 4:8 (b) ===
- KJV: "And Jesus answered and said unto to him, Get thee behind me, Satan: for it is written, Thou shalt worship the Lord thy God, and him only shalt thou serve."
- Modern versions (RV): (omits the words "Get thee behind me, Satan:").
- Reason: The emphasized words, although by now a very familiar quotation, are omitted from the RV and most other modern versions; it was also omitted by the Wycliffe (1380) and Rheims (1582) versions. This clause is not found in Codex Sinaiticus, Codex Vaticanus, Codex Bezae, Codex Regius, Codex Washingtonianus, Codex Zacynthius, Family 1, several cursives, and Latin, Sahidic, and many Syriac and Boharic manuscripts. It is present in Codex Alexandrinus, Codex Koridethi, Codex Athous Lavrensis, Family 13, and some Italic manuscripts. It is believed probable that the clause was inserted here by assimilation because the corresponding version of this narrative, in Matthew, contains a somewhat similar rebuke to the Devil (in the KJV, "Get thee hence, Satan,"; Matthew 4:10, which is the way this rebuke reads in Luke 4:8 in the Tyndale (1534), Great Bible (also called the Cranmer Bible) (1539), and Geneva (1557) versions), whose authenticity is not disputed, and because the very same words are used in a different situation in Matthew 16:23 and Mark 8:33. The omission of this clause from Luke 4:8 in critical texts is so well-established that no comment about the omission appears in the Appendix to Westcott & Hort, in Scrivener's Plain Introduction to Textual Criticism, or in the UBS New Testament.

=== Luke 9:55–56 ===
- KJV: "^{55} But he turned, and rebuked them, and said, Ye know not what manner of spirit ye are of. ^{56}For the Son of man is not come to destroy men's lives, but to save them. And they went to another village."
- Modern versions (RV): "^{55}But he turned and rebuked them. ^{56}And they went to another village." (The Revised Version has a marginal note: "Some ancient authorities add "and said, Ye know not what manner of spirit ye are of." Some, but fewer, add also: "For the Son of man came not to destroy men's lives, but to save them." Many modern versions omit these words without a note.")
- Reasons: The shorter version is found in very early manuscripts, although the longer version is used by most Latin manuscripts, which is why it is also present in early English translations. The shorter version, omitting the doubted phrases in both verses, appears in Codex Sinaiticus, Codex Alexandrinus, Codex Vaticanus, Codex Ephraemi Rescriptus, Codex Regius, Codex Washingtonianus, Codex Monacensis, Codex Sangallensis, Codex Zacynthius, Codex Athous Lavrensis, Papyrus 45, and Papyrus 75, but the words do appear (with minor variants) in some slightly later authorities, such as Codex Bezae and Codex Cyprius (Codex Bezae contains the phrase in verse 55, but not the phrase in verse 56). The UBS gives the omission of the doubted phrases a confidence rating of only C, and Westcott and Hort "thought it safer" to have the words in the main text but enclosed in single brackets. The two passages were omitted from printed Greek New Testaments as early as Griesbach's first edition in 1774. Both passages occur in the Majority Text editions but the Robinson & Pierpont edition encloses them with brackets, and the Hodges and Farsted edition has a footnote to the effect that the words are from the Textus Receptus but not found in some of the Majority text sources.

=== Luke 23:17 ===
- KJV: "(For of necessity he must release one unto them at the feast.)"
- (The **Good News Bible**, as a footnote, gave this as: "At every Passover Festival Pilate had to set free one prisoner for them.")
- Reasons: The same verse or a very similar verse appears (and is preserved) as Matthew 27:15 and as Mark 15:6. This verse is suspected of having been assimilated into Luke at a very early date. However, it is missing from Luke in such early manuscripts as Papyrus 75 (early 3rd century), Codex Alexandrinus, Codex Vaticanus, Codex Cyprius, Codex Regius, the Sahidic version, a Bohairic manuscript, and an Italic manuscript. On the other hand, it does appear in Codex Sinaiticus, Codex Washingtonianus, Family 1, Family 13, and some Syriac and Bohairic manuscripts, which indicates that its assimilation into Luke had begun at a fairly early time. However, Codex Bezae, the Ethiopic version, and some Italic and Syriac manuscripts put this verse after what is called verse 18, which may further indicate that it was an insertion rather than part of the authorial text. Moffatt characterized this verse as "an explanatory and harmonistic gloss." The verse in Luke does differ from the contexts of the similar verses at Matthew 27:15 and Mark 15:6, where releasing a prisoner on Passover is a "habit" or "custom" of Pilate, and at John 18:39 is a custom of the Jews – but in its appearance in Luke it becomes a necessity for Pilate regardless of his habits or preferences, "to comply with a law which never existed." Aland lays stress on the differences among the Gospel accounts and says, "Even though א reads the insertion, the evidence for [...] omission is stronger by far."

=== Acts 9:5–6 ===
- KJV: "^{5}And he said, Who art thou, Lord? And the Lord said, I am Jesus whom thou persecutest: it is hard for thee to kick against the pricks. ^{6}And he trembling and astonished said, Lord, what wilt thou have me to do? And the Lord said unto him, Arise, and go into the city, and it shall be told thee what thou must do. (All in bold type omitted in modern versions)
- Modern versions (RV): "^{5}[...] 'I am Jesus whom thou persecutest; ^{6}but rise, and enter into the city, and it shall be told thee what thou must do.'" Entirely omitted words: "it is hard for thee to kick against the pricks. And he trembling and astonished said, Lord, what wilt thou have me to do? And the Lord said unto him,"
- Reason: The passage in question is omitted from virtually all modern versions (including both Majority Text editions), frequently without even a footnote. The reason for its omission is, as Bruce M. Metzger puts it, "So far as is known, no Greek witness reads these words at this place; they have been taken from [Acts] 26:14 and 22:10, and are found here in codices of the Vulgate. [...] The spurious passage came into the Textus Receptus when Erasmus translated it from the Latin Vulgate and inserted it in his first edition of the Greek New Testament (Basel, 1516). The 18th century Bible scholar, Johann David Michaelis, wrote (c. 1749), "[This] long passage [...] has been found in not a single Greek manuscript, not even in those which have been lately [c. 1785] collated by Matthai. It is likewise wanting in the Complutensian edition; but it was inserted by Erasmus [translating it from the Latin Vulgate], and upon his authority it has been adopted by the other editors of the Greek Testament...This passage then, which later editors have copied from Erasmus, and which is contained in our common editions, is not only spurious, but was not even taken from a Greek manuscript." The passage does not appear in the Complutensian Polyglot (1516) and noted as doubtful in Wettstein's 1763 London edition, and since then it scarcely appeared in the main text and sometimes not even as a footnote in editions of the Greek New Testament and modern translations.

=== Acts 13:42 ===
- KJV: "And when the Jews were gone out of the synagogue, the Gentiles besought that these words might be preached to them the next Sabbath." (All in bold type omitted in modern versions)
- Modern versions (RV): "And as they went out, they besought that these words might be spoken to them the next sabbath."
- Reason: The KJV passage, with its explicit mention of Gentiles interested in the events of the next Sabbath, is a sort of proof text for those denominations that adhere to Seventh Day worship. For example, Benjamin G. Wilkinson, in his 1930 book, Our Authorized Bible Vindicated, says "The Authorized Version pictures to us the congregation, composed of Jews and Gentiles. By this distinction it reveals that a number of the Gentiles were present... All this is lost in the Revised Version by failing to mention the Jews and the Gentiles. [...] Does not this affect fundamental doctrine?" However, the RV's text is that of the earliest and most esteemed manuscripts – Papyrus 74, Codex Sinaiticus, Codex Alexandrinus, Codex Vaticanus, Codex Ephraemi Rescriptus, Codex Claromontanus, and many others, including the Latin Vulgate and other ancient versions; the appearance of the words for Jews and for Gentiles (ethna) occurs in Codex Athous Lavrensis and Codex Porphyrianus (both 9th century) and a number of later manuscripts. A possible reason for the rewriting of this verse is that the original is awkward and ambiguous—the Greek text says "they went out [...] they requested", without any further identification; it is not clear who the two "they" are, whether they are the same or different groups. Bishops Westcott and Hort describe the original (RV) reading as "the obscure and improbable language of the text as it stands." Even before the KJV, the Wycliffe version (1380) and the Douay-Rheims version (1582) had renderings that resembled the original (Revised Version) text. The ambiguity of the original reading has motivated some modern interpretations to attempt to identify "they"—e.g., the Good News Bible, the New American Standard, the NIV, and the New RSV, have Paul and Barnabas going out and 'the people' inviting them to repeat or expand on their preaching.

=== Acts 23:9 (b) ===
- KJV: "Let us not fight against God."
- Modern versions (RV): (omitted without a note)
- Reason: This phrase, which also appears in Acts 5:39, does not appear in the earliest and best resources – Papyrus 74, Codex Sinaiticus, Codex Alexandrinus, Codex Vaticanus, Codex Ephraemi Rescriptus (original hand), Codex Laudianus, Codex Athous Lavrensis, Latin, Syriac, and others – and does not appear until Codex Mutinensis, Codex Angelicus, and Codex Porphyrianus (all 9th century). As the original verse ended with a question, it is suspected that this phrase was taken from 5:39 to serve as an answer. Even before the KJV, it was omitted in the Wycliffe and Douay-Rheims versions. It was omitted from editions of the Greek New Testament at least as far back as 1729, in Daniel Mace's edition.

== Not omitted but boxed ==
There are two passages (both 12 verses long) that continue to appear in the main text of most of the modern versions, but distinguished in some way from the rest of the text, such as being enclosed in brackets or printed in different typeface or relegated to a footnote. These are passages which are well supported by a wide variety of sources of great antiquity and yet there is strong reason to doubt that the words were part of the original text of the Gospels. In the words of Philip Schaff, "According to the judgment of the best critics, these two important sections are additions to the original text from apostolic tradition."

=== Mark 16:9–20 ===
- KJV: "^{9}Now when Jesus was risen early the first day of the week, he appeared first to Mary Magdalene, out of whom he had cast seven devils. ^{10}And she went and told them that had been with him, as they mourned and wept. ^{11}And they, when they had heard that he was alive, and had been seen of her, believed not. ^{12}After that he appeared in another form unto two of them, as they walked, and went into the country. ^{13}And they went and told it unto the residue: neither believed they them. ^{14}Afterward he appeared unto the eleven as they sat at meat, and upbraided them with their unbelief and hardness of heart, because they believed not them which had seen him after he was risen. ^{15}And he said unto them, Go ye into all the world, and preach the gospel to every creature. ^{16}He that believeth and is baptized shall be saved; but he that believeth not shall be damned. ^{17}And these signs shall follow them that believe; In my name shall they cast out devils; they shall speak with new tongues; ^{18}They shall take up serpents; (Note: This verse – "They shall take up serpents" – (some Greek manuscripts include the words "with their hands") has become controversial because it has become the proof-text of the sect of snake handling churches, begun around 1910 and found mostly in Appalachia, wherein poisonous snakes are taken from cages, carried aloft by hand for several minutes and then returned alive to the cages. However, although the Greek word here, αρούσίν (root: αίρω), usually means 'to lift upward' or 'to pick up', as it appears here in the KJV and virtually all subsequent translations, the pre-KJV English versions translated the same root as it is used in John 19:15 and Luke 23:18 and Acts 21:36 and elsewhere, in the sense of killing or removing (in the KJV translated as "Away with him"). The opening words (in modernized spelling) of Mark 16:18 were translated in the Wycliffe version (1382 & 1395) as "They shall do away [with] serpents", and in the Tyndale version (1525) as "shall kill serpents" (and similarly in Martin Luther's German version), and in the Coverdale version (1534), Great Bible (1539), and Bishops' Bible (1568) as "they shall drive away serpents", and in Geneva Bible (1560) and Rheims (1582) as "shall take away serpents". The difference from the KJV's rendering seems significant.) and if they drink any deadly thing, it shall not hurt them; they shall lay hands on the sick, and they shall recover. ^{19}So then after the Lord had spoken unto them, he was received up into heaven, and sat on the right hand of God. ^{20}And they went forth, and preached everywhere, the Lord working with them, and confirming the word with signs following. Amen."
- Reason: Entire volumes have been written about these twelve verses, and considerable attention is paid to these verses in many texts and articles on textual criticism of the New Testament. According to Reuss, the 1849 Greek New Testament of Tischendorf was the first to remove these verses from the main text.

The twelve verses shown in the KJV, called the "longer ending" of Mark, usually are retained in modern versions, although sometimes separated from verse 8 by an extra space, or enclosed in brackets, or relegated to a footnote, and accompanied by a note to the effect that this ending is not found in the very oldest Greek manuscripts but it is found in sources almost as old.
The RV of 1881 put an extra space between verse 8 and this verse 9 and included a marginal note to that effect, a practice followed by many subsequent English versions. The RSV edition of 1947 ends its main text at verse 8 and then in a footnote provides this ending with the note that "other texts and versions" include it; but the revised RSV of 1971 and the NRSV reverted to the practice of the RV.
Although the longer ending appears in 99% of the surviving Greek manuscripts and most ancient versions, there is strong evidence, both external and internal, for concluding that it was not part of the original text of the Gospel. B.F. Westcott theorized that these verses "are probably fragments of apostolic tradition, though not parts of the evangelic text."
The preceding portion of chapter 16 tells how Mary Magdalene and two other women came to the tomb, found it opened and Jesus's body missing, and were told by a young man in a white robe to convey a message to Peter and the other disciples, but the women fled and said nothing to anyone because they were frightened. The last words of verse 8 are, in Greek, έφοβούντο γάρ, usually translated 'for they were afraid'. It is nowadays widely accepted that these are the last remaining verses written by the author of Mark. The Gospel of Mark ends somewhat abruptly at end of verse 8 ("for they were afraid.") in Codex Sinaiticus and Codex Vaticanus (both 4th century) and some much later Greek manuscripts, a few manuscripts of the ancient versions (Syriac, Coptic, Armenian), and is specifically mentioned in the writings of such Church Fathers as Eusebius and Jerome explicitly doubted the authenticity of the verses after verse 8 ("Almost all the Greek copies do not contain this concluding portion."), most other Church Fathers do not quote from this ending. No papyrus contains any portion of the 12 verses.
On the other hand, these 12 verses occur in slightly less ancient Greek manuscripts, Codex Alexandrinus, Codex Ephraemi Rescriptus, Codex Bezae, Codex Cyprius, Codex Koridethi, Family 13, and a "vast number" of others, and a great many manuscripts of the ancient versions, and is quoted by some other Church Fathers, the earliest being Irenaeus, in the late second century (although his quotations are imprecise). It would appear, initially, that the evidence was nearly in equipoise.
Yet other ancient sources include this longer ending – but mark it with asterisks or other signs or notations indicating the copyists had doubts about its authenticity, most notably Family 1 and several minuscules (all 12th century or later), according to the UBS notes and Bruce Metzger.
Although this longer ending is of great antiquity, some early Church Fathers were familiar with manuscripts that lacked it. Eusebius, in the first half of the fourth century, wrote, in response to a query from a man named Marinus, about how Matthew 28:1 conflicts with the Longer Ending on which day Jesus rose from the dead, with the comment, "He who is for getting rid of the entire passage [at the end of Mark] will say that it is not met with in all the copies of Mark's Gospel; the accurate copies, at all events, making the end of Mark's narrative come after the words [...] '... for they were afraid.' [verse 8] For at those words, in almost all copies of the Gospel According to Mark, comes the end. What follows, which is met with seldom, [and only] in some copies, certainly not in all, might be dispensed with; especially if it should prove to contradict the record of the other Evangelists. This, then, is what a person will say who is for evading and entirely getting rid of a gratuitous problem." Eusebius goes on to try to reconcile the longer ending with the other Gospel accounts, if the longer ending were to be regarded as authentic. Jerome, in the first half of the 5th century, received a very similar query from a lady named Hedibia and responded, "Either we should reject the testimony of Mark, which is met with in scarcely any copies of the Gospel, – almost all the Greek codices being without this passage, – especially since it seems to narrate what contradicts the other Gospels; – or else, we shall reply that both Evangelists state what is true." This might be thought an authoritative statement but Jerome compromised it by including the Longer Ending, without any apparent notation about doubting it, in his Latin Vulgate, and Burgon (among others) thinks this inclusion is an endorsement of its authenticity. It has been suggested or suspected that Jerome's expression of doubt was actually a rehash of the similar comment by Eusebius, but, to the contrary, it is possible that Jerome was unaware of this particular opinion of Eusebius, considering that it was utterly unknown to modern scholars until its fortuitous discovery in 1825.
Burgon also found a patristic comment previously attributed to Gregory of Nyssa (of the late 4th century), but which he suspected was more likely written by Hesychius of Jerusalem (middle of the 5th century) or Severus of Antioch (middle 6th century), again answering the same sort of query, and saying, "In the more accurate copies, the Gospel according to Mark has its end at 'for they were afraid.' In some copies, however, this also is added – 'Now when He was risen early [on] the first day of the week, He appeared first to Mary Magdalene ...'." In this instance Gregory of Nyssa (or Hesychius or Severus) goes on to eliminate the problem by suggesting the imposition of punctuation different from that used in any of the Greek manuscripts (the earliest had no punctuation at all, the later manuscripts had little more than commas and periods) or in the KJV, to make the first verse of the Longer Ending appear to be "Now when He was risen: Early on the first day of the week He appeared first to Mary Magdalene ..." In other words, that Jesus had risen presumably at the end of the Sabbath, as suggested in the other gospels, but he did not appear to Mary Magdalene until the next day.
Codex Washingtonianus (also known as the Freer Gospels), dating from the fourth or fifth century, is the oldest known Greek manuscript that sets forth the longer ending and it contains a lengthy addition (which appears nowhere else), known as the Freer Logion, between the familiar verses 14 and 15. The Freer Logion was not noticed until 1908, following the sale of the manuscript in 1906. The addition in Codex Washingtonianus is included (in brackets) in James Moffatt's 1935 translation, with a note indicating Moffatt's belief, a belief apparently shared also by Henry Barclay Swete, but not by many others, that it was part of the original text of the longer ending "but was excised for some reason at an early date." It was not included in the RSV, but is set forth in a footnote to verse 14 in the NRSV with the comment that "other ancient authorities [sic plural] add, in whole or part".
The addition, as translated by Moffatt:

But they excused themselves saying, "This age of lawlessness and unbelief lies under the sway of Satan, who will not allow what lies under the unclean spirits to understand the truth and power of God; therefore," they said to Christ, "reveal your righteousness now." Christ answered them, "The term of years for Satan's power has now expired, but other terrors are at hand. I was delivered to death on behalf of sinners, that they might return to the truth and sin no more, that they might inherit that glory of righteousness which is spiritual and imperishable in heaven."

In 1891, Frederick Cornwallis Conybeare, while collating several ancient Armenian manuscripts in the library of the monastery at Ećmiadzin, at the foot of Mount Ararat, in what is now Turkey, found an uncial codex written in the year 986, bound with ivory front and back covers. As Conybeare described it:

"Now in this codex the Gospel of Mark is copied out as far as έφοβούντο γάρ [i.e., the end of 16:8]. Then a space of two lines is left, after which, in the same uncial hand, only in red, is written "Ariston Eritzou." which means "Of the Presbyter Ariston." This title occupies one whole line (the book is written in double columns) and then follow the last twelve verses [i.e., the longer ending] still in the same hand. They begin near the bottom of the second column of a verse, and are continued on the recto of the next folio."

The text in this Armenian codex is a literal translation of the longer ending from the Greek manuscripts. In other words, the longer ending was attributed, in this 10th century Armenian codex, to a "Presbyter Ariston". Conybeare theorized that Ariston was the Armenian version of the Greek name Aristion. Of a number of Aristions known to history, Conybeare favored the Aristion who had traveled with the original Disciples and was known to Papias, a famous Bishop of the early 2nd century; a quotation from Papias, mentioning Aristion as a Disciple, is found in the Historia Ecclesiastica of Eusebius, 3:39:4. Other candidates includes an Aristo of Pella, who flourished around the year 140, also mentioned by Eusebius in the Historia Ecclesiastica, 4:6:3, favored by Alfred Resch, but Conybeare considered him too late to have written the longer ending in time for it to have achieved its widespread acceptance. An examination of 220 Armenian manuscripts of Mark showed that 88 contained the longer ending as a regular part of the text, 99 stop at verse 8, and 33 contained the longer ending as a subsequent insertion into the manuscripts. It may be significant that where the Armenian manuscripts do reproduce the longer ending, some have conspicuous variants from the Greek version, and a few Armenian manuscripts put the longer ending elsewhere than at the end of Mark – of the 220 Armenian manuscripts studied, two put the longer ending at the end of the Gospel of John, and one puts it at the end of Luke, and one manuscript has the longer ending at the end of Mark and the shorter ending at the end of the Gospel of Luke. Even into the 17th century, some Armenian copyists were omitting the longer ending or including it with a note doubting its genuineness.
The situation is complicated further due to the fact that some other ancient sources have an entirely different ending to Mark, after verse 8, known as the shorter ending. The RV of 1881 contained a footnote attesting to the existence of this shorter ending but its text did not appear in a popular edition of the Bible until somewhat later. It appeared in the footnote at this place in the RSV and then in brackets in the main text of the NRSV:

But they reported briefly to Peter and those with him all that they had been told. After this, Jesus himself sent out by means of them, from east to west, the sacred and imperishable proclamation of eternal salvation.

This shorter ending appears, by itself without the longer ending, after verse 8, in only one manuscript, an Italic manuscript, Codex Bobbiensis, of the 4th or 5th century. However, there are a handful of other sources that contain the shorter ending then add the longer ending after it. The shorter ending is found in Greek in Fragment Sinaiticum (0112) (7th century), Fragment Parisiense (Uncial 099) (8th century), Codex Regius (8th century), and Codex Athous Lavrensis (8th or 9th century); in the first three it is preceded with a copyist's note about being found in only some manuscripts, in Codex Athous Lavrensis it follows verse 8 without such a note, and in all four the shorter ending is followed by the longer ending. It is also reported to appear similarly (first shorter, then longer ending) in some ancient versions. Wherever the shorter ending appears, even when combined with the longer ending, there is some separation in the text (decoration or a copyist's notation) immediately after verse 8; the only exception being Codex Athous Lavrensis, which treats the shorter ending as the proper continuation after verse 8 – but then inserts a copyist's note before providing the longer ending.
The very existence of the shorter ending, whose composition is estimated as the middle of the 2nd century, is taken as evidence that the longer ending is not appreciably older, because the shorter ending would not have been worked up if the longer ending were then readily available.
As a result, there are five possible endings to the Gospel of Mark: (1) An abrupt ending at end of verse 8; (2) the longer ending following verse 8; (3) the longer ending including the "Freer Logion"; (4) the shorter ending following verse 8; and (5) the shorter and longer endings combined.
It would appear that the longer ending does not fit precisely with the preceding portion of chapter 16. For example, verse 9 says Jesus appeared to Mary Magdalene on "the first day of the week", yet verse 2 said that same day Mary Magdalene did not see Jesus. Perhaps more significantly, verse 9 finds it necessary to identify Mary Magdalene as the woman who had been freed of seven demons, as if she had not been named before, yet she was mentioned without that detail being mentioned in 15:47 and 16:1. Verse 9 in Greek does not mention Jesus by name or title, but only says "Having arisen [...] he appeared ..." (the KJV's inclusion of the name Jesus was an editorial emendation as indicated by the use of italic typeface) – and, in fact, Jesus is not expressly named until verses 19 and 20 ("the Lord" in both verses); a lengthy use of a pronoun without identification. Additionally, the style and vocabulary of the longer ending appear not to be in the same style as the rest of the Gospel. The Greek text used by the KJV translators is 166 words long, using a vocabulary of (very approximately) 140 words. Yet, out of that small number, 16 words do not appear elsewhere in the Gospel of Mark, 5 words are used here in a different way than used elsewhere in Mark, and 4 phrases do not appear elsewhere in Mark. The shorter ending, in Greek, is approximately (depending on the variants) 32 words long, of which 7 words do not appear elsewhere in Mark. The Freer Logion consists of 89 words, of which 8 words do not appear elsewhere in Mark. The stylistic differences suggest that none of these was written by the author of the Gospel of St. Mark. Metzger speaks of the "inconcinnities" between the first 8 verses of chapter 16 and the longer ending, and suggests, "all these features indicate that the section was added by someone who knew a form of Mark that ended abruptly with verse 8 and who wished to supply a more appropriate conclusion." Alfred Plummer puts it very strongly, "The twelve verses not only do not belong to Mark, they quite clearly belong to some other document. While Mark has no proper ending, these verses have no proper beginning. [...] Not only does verse 9 not fit onto verse 8, but the texture of what follows is quite different from the texture of what precedes. A piece torn from a bit of satin is appended to the torn end of roll of homespun."
The preceding verse, verse 16:8, ends abruptly. Although the KJV and most English translations render this as the end of a complete sentence ("for they were afraid."), the Greek words έφοβούντο γάρ suggest that the sentence is incomplete. The word γάρ is a sort of conjunction and rarely occurs at the end of a sentence. The word έφοβούντο does not mean merely 'afraid' but suggests a mention to the cause of the fear, as if to say "they were afraid of [something]", but this cause of fear is not stated in the verse. The attachment of neither the longer nor shorter ending (nor both of them) smooth this "ragged edge to an imperfect document". There is also a problem with the narrative; verses 6 and 7, whose genuineness is undoubted, says that Jesus is "not here" (in Jerusalem) but will appear to them and the disciples in Galilee. The shorter ending does not contradict this, but the longer ending, in verse 9, immediately contradicts this by having Jesus appear to Mary Magdalene while in Jerusalem, and in verse 12 to two disciples apparently not yet in Galilee. This inconsistency has been considered significant by some.
Although the longer ending was included, without any indication of doubt, as part of chapter 16 of the Gospel of Mark in the various Textus Receptus editions, the editor of the first published Textus Receptus edition, namely Erasmus of Rotterdam, discovered (evidently after his fifth and final edition of 1535) that Codex Vaticanus ended the Gospel at verse 8, whereupon he mentioned doubts about the longer ending in a manuscript which lay unpublished until modern times. The omission of the longer ending in Codex Vaticanus apparently was not realized again until rediscovered in 1801 by the Danish scholar Andreas Birch (whose discovery got very little publicity owing to a fire that destroyed his newly published book before it could be much distributed). After that, the omission was again rediscovered by Johann Jakob Griesbach, and was reflected in his third edition (1803) of the Greek New Testament, where he ended the Gospel at verse 8 and separated the longer ending and enclosed it in brackets, very much as most modern editions of the Greek text and many modern English versions continue to do.
A commonly accepted theory for the condition of the last chapter of the Gospel of Mark is that the words actually written by the author end, somewhat abruptly, with verse 8. This abrupt ending may have been a deliberate choice of the author or because the last part of their writing (after verse 8) was somehow separated from the rest of their manuscript and was lost (an alternative theory is that the author died before finishing their gospel). From the incomplete manuscript the copies that end abruptly at verse 8 were directly or remotely copied. At some point, two other people, dissatisfied with the abrupt ending at verse 8, and writing independently of each other, supplied the longer and the shorter endings. The longer ending was written perhaps as early as the last decade of the 1st century and acquired some popularity, and the shorter ending could have been written even as late as a few centuries later. The "lost page" theory has gotten wide acceptance, other theories have suggested that the last page was not lost by accident but was deliberately suppressed, perhaps because something in the author's original conclusion was troublesome to certain Christians. No matter how or why the original and genuine conclusion to the gospel disappeared, the consensus is that neither the longer nor shorter endings provide an authentic continuation to verse 8. Explanations aside, it is now widely (although not unanimously) accepted that the author's own words end with verse 8 and anything after that was written by someone else at a later date.

=== John 7:53–8:11 ===
- KJV: "^{53}And every man went unto his own house. ^{8:1}Jesus went unto the Mount of Olives; ^{2}And early in the morning he came again unto the Temple, and all the people came unto him, and he sat down, and taught them. ^{3}And the Scribes and Pharisees brought unto him a woman taken in adultery, and when they had set her in the midst, ^{4}They say unto him, 'Master, this woman was taken in adultery, in the very act. ^{5}Now Moses in the Law commanded us that such should be stoned, but what sayest thou?' ^{6}This they said, tempting [testing] him, that they might have to [be able to] accuse him. But Jesus stooped down, and with his finger wrote on the ground as though he heard them not. ^{7}So when they continued asking him, he lift up himself, and said unto them, 'He that is without sin among you, let him first cast a stone at her.' ^{8}And again, he stooped down, and wrote on the ground. ^{9}And they which heard it, being convicted by their own conscience, went out one by one, beginning at the eldest, even unto the last, and Jesus was left alone, and [with] the woman standing in the midst. ^{10}When Jesus had lift up himself, and saw none but the woman, he said unto her, 'Woman, where are thine accusers? Hath no man condemned thee?' ^{11}She said, 'No man, Lord.' And Jesus said unto her, 'Neither do I condemn thee. Go, and sin no more.'"
- Reason: This familiar story of the adulteress saved by Jesus is a special case. These dozen verses have been the subject of a number of books, including Chris Keith, The Pericope Adulterae, the Gospel of John, and the Literacy of Jesus (2009); David Alan Black & Jacob N. Cerone, eds., The Pericope of the Adulteress in Contemporary Research (2016); John David Punch, The Pericope Adulterae: Theories of Insertion & Omission (2012), and Jennifer Knust & Tommy Wasserman, To Cast the First Stone: The Transmission of a Gospel Story (2019). The principal problem affecting this paragraph is that, although it appears in many ancient manuscripts, it does not consistently appear in this place in chapter 8 nor even in the Gospel of John. Moreover, in the various manuscripts in which the passage appears, it presents a much greater number of variations (Note: As an example of such a variation, in the KJV verse 9 occurs the phrase, "being convicted by their own conscience," – but this phrase did not appear in Erasmus's editions although it appeared in the Complutensian and most subsequent TR editions, nor in most manuscripts that contain this pericope. It appears in Codex Cyprius of the 9th century, and Codex 579, of the 13th century, and a very few other places. It was not included in the earliest English versions – it is missing from Wycliffe, Tyndale, the Great Bible, the Geneva, the Rheims, and the Bishops Bible, and it apparently first appeared in the KJV.) than an equal portion of the New Testament – so much so, that it would seem that there are three distinct versions of the pericope.

By its own context, this paragraph appears misplaced; in the verse preceding this pericope (namely verse 7:52) Jesus is conversing or arguing with a group of men, and in the verse following this pericope (verse 8:12) he is speaking "again unto them", even though verses 8:9–10 would indicate he was alone in the Temple courtyard and also that a day has passed. It would seem possible that, originally, 7:52 was immediately followed by 8:12, and somehow this pericope was inserted between them, interrupting the narrative.

The pericope does not appear in the oldest Codices – Codex Sinaiticus, Codex Alexandrinus, Codex Vaticanus, Codex Ephraemi Rescriptus, Codex Regius, Codex Petropolitanus Purpureus, Codex Borgianus, Codex Washingtonianus, Codex Monacensis, Codex Sangallensis, Codex Koridethi, Codex Athous Lavrensis – nor in Papyri 66 or 75, nor in Minuscules 33, 157, 565, 892, 1241, or Family 1424 nor in the Peshitta. (Note: In the case of Codex Alexandrinus and Codex Ephraemi Rescriptus, the manuscripts are damaged so that the actual text of John 7:53–8:11 is missing but the surrounding text does not leave enough space for the pericope to have been present. In the case of the papyri, these are so very fragmentary that they show only that the pericope was not in its familiar place at the beginning of chapter 8.) Scrivener lists more than 50 minuscules that lack the pericope, and several more in which the original scribe omitted it but a later hand inserted it. It is also missing from the Syriac and Sahidic versions and some Egyptian versions. Westcott and Hort summarize the evidence as follows:

Not only is [the section on the Woman taken in Adultery] passed over in silence in every Greek commentary of which we have any knowledge, down to that of Theophylact inclusive (11th–12th centuries); but with the exception of a reference in the Apostolic Constitutions (? 4th century), and a statement by an obscure Nicon (10th century or later) that it was expunged by the Armenians, not the slightest allusion to it has yet been discovered in the whole of Greek theology before the 12th century. The earliest Greek manuscripts containing it, except the Western Codex Bezae [5th century], are of the 8th century. [...] It has no right to a place in the Fourth Gospel, yet it is evidently from an ancient source, and it could not now without serious loss be entirely banished from the New Testament.

However, one manuscript, Minuscule 225, placed the pericope after John 7:36. Several – Family 1 – placed it at the very end of the Gospel of John, and Scrivener adds several more that have so placed a shorter pericope beginning at verse 8:3. Another handful of minuscules – Family 13 – put it after Luke 21:38. Some manuscripts – Codex Vaticanus 354, Codex Basilensis, Codex Tischendorfianus III – had it in the familiar place but enclosed the pericope with marks of doubt (asterisks or some other glyph), and Scrivener lists more than 40 minuscules that also apply marks of doubt to the pericope.
Some scholars have suggested that the pericope is not written in the same style as the rest of the Gospel of John, and have suggested it is written more in the style of the Gospel of Luke, a suggestion supported by the fact that the Family 13 manuscripts actually put the pericope into the Gospel of Luke. For example, nowhere else does the Gospel of John mention by name the Mount of Olives, and where a new place is mentioned in John some explanatory remarks are attached, nor does John mention 'the Scribes' elsewhere. A theory shared by several scholars is that this pericope represents some very early tradition or folktale about Jesus, not originally found in any of the canonical gospels, which was so popular or compelling that it was deliberately inserted into a gospel; a variant on this theory is that this anecdote was written down as a note for a sermon, perhaps in the margin of a codex or on a scrap inserted between the pages of a codex, and a subsequent copyist mistakenly incorporated it in the main text when working up a new copy. Its source might be indicated by Eusebius (early 4th century), in his Historia Ecclesia, book 3, section 39, where he says, "Papias [2nd century] [...] reproduces a story about a woman falsely accused before the Lord of many sins. This is to be found in the Gospel of the Hebrews."
This pericope was framed with marks of doubt in Johann Jakob Wettstein's 1751 Greek New Testament and some earlier Greek editions contained notes doubting its authenticity. The evidence that the pericope, although a much-beloved story, does not belong in the place assigned it by many late manuscripts, and, further, that it might not be part of the original text of any of the gospels, caused the Revised Version (1881) to enclose it within brackets, in its familiar place after John 7:52, with the sidenote, "Most of the ancient authorities omit John 7:53–8:11. Those which contain it vary much from each other." This practice has been imitated in most of the English versions since then. The Westcott & Hort Greek New Testament omitted the pericope from the main text and places it as an appendix after the end of the Gospel of John, with this explanation: "It has no right to a place in the text of the Four Gospels; yet it is evidently from an ancient source, and it could not now without serious loss be entirely banished from the New Testament. [...] As it forms an independent narrative, it seems to stand best alone at the end of the Gospels with double brackets to show its inferior authority ..." Some English translations based on Westcott & Hort imitate this practice of appending the pericope at the end of the gospel (e.g., The Twentieth Century New Testament), while others simply omit it altogether (e.g., Goodspeed, Ferrar Fenton, the 2013 revision of The New World Version). The Nestle-Aland and UBS Greek editions enclose it in double brackets. The two 'Majority Text' Greek editions set forth the pericope in the main text (varying slightly from each other) but provide extensive notes elsewhere attesting to the lack of uniformity in the text of the pericope and doubts about its origin.
Caspar René Gregory, who compiled a catalog of New Testament manuscripts, summarizes the situation: "Now I have no doubt that the story [of the adulteress] itself is as old as the Gospel of John or even older, and that it is a true story. But it is no part of that gospel. That is perfectly sure."
It was the opinion of M.R. James, in his Apocryphal New Testament (p. 34), "It is hardly necessary, perhaps, to observe that the Last Twelve Verses of St. Mark and the story of the woman taken in adultery form no part of the original text of the Gospels."

== Other English translations ==
O	Omitted in main text.
B	Bracketed in the main text – The translation team and most biblical scholars today believe were not part of the original text. However, these texts have been retained in brackets in the NASB and the Holman CSB.
F	Omission noted in the footnote.
B+F	Bracketed text with a footnote.

Bible translation
Passage	NIV	NASB	NKJV	NRSV	ESV	HCSB	NET	NLT	WEB	REB	AMP	CEB	CJB	CEV	ERV	GW	EXB	GNT	Knox	LEB	MSG	Mounce	NIrV	NLV	OJB	NWT
Matthew 9:34										F																
Matthew 12:47				F	F	F		F			F		O	F			F	F								
Matthew 17:21	F	B	F	O	F	B	O	F		F	F	O	O			O	F	O		O	O	O				O
Matthew 18:11	F	B	F	O	F	B	O	O		F	F	O	O		O	O	F	O		O	O	O				O
Matthew 21:44			F	F		B		F		F	F		O	F	F	F	F	O								
Matthew 23:14	F	B	F	O	F	B	O	O		F	F	O	O		O	O	F	O		O	O	O				O
Mark 7:16	F	B	F	O	F	B	O	O		F	F	O	O		O	F	F	O		O	O	O				O
Mark 9:44	F	B	F	O	F	B	O	O		F	O	O	O		O	O	F	O		O	O	O				O
Mark 9:46	F	B	F	O	F	B	O	O		F	O	O	O		O	O	F	O		O	O	O				O
Mark 11:26	F	B	F	O	F	B	O	O		F		O	O		O	O	F	O		O	O	O			B	O
Mark 15:28	F	B	F	O	F	B	O	O		F	F	O	O		O	O	F	O		O	O	O			B	O
Mark 16:9–20	B	B	F	F	B	B	B				F	B	F	F			B	F		B	B			B		O
Luke 17:36	F	B	F	O	F	B	O	O	F	F	F	O	O		O	O	F	O		O	O	O				O
Luke 22:20						F		F		F								F				O				
Luke 22:43		B	F	F		B	B	F							F	F		F		B+F						
Luke 22:44		B	F	F		B	B	F						F	F	F		F		B+F						
Luke 23:17	F	B	F	O	F	B	O	O		F	F	O	O	F	O	O	F	O		O	O	O			B	O
Luke 24:12										F				F	O			F								
Luke 24:40				F						F								F								
John 5:4	F	B	F	O	F	B	O	O		F		O	O		O	O	F	O		O	O	O		B	B	O
John 7:53–8:11		B	F	F	B	B	B				F						B			B+F						O
Acts 8:37	F	B	F	F	F	B	O	O	F	F	F	O	O		O	O	F	O		O	O	O		B	B	O
Acts 15:34	F	B	F	O	F	O	O	O	F	F	F	O	O		O	O	F	O		O	O	O			B	O
Acts 24:7	F	B	F	O	F	B	O	O	F	F		O	O			O		O		O	O	O			B	O
Acts 28:29	F	B	F	O	F	B	O	O		F	F	O	O		O	O	F	O		O	O	O			B	O
Romans 16:24	F	B	F	O	F	B	O	O		F	F	O	O		O	O	F	O			O	O			O	O

== Versification differences ==
Some English translations have minor versification differences compared with the KJV.

=== Romans 14 and 16 ===
The KJV ends the Epistle to the Romans with these verses as 16:25–27:

^{25}Now to him that is of power to establish you according to my Gospel, and the preaching of Jesus Christ, according to the revelation of the mystery, which was kept secret since the world began:^{26}But now is made manifest, and by the Scriptures of the Prophets, according to the commandment of the everlasting God, made known to all nations for the obedience of faith,^{27}To God, only wise, be glory through Jesus Christ, for ever. Amen. (Note: Different editions of the KJV show various treatments of the punctuation, especially at the end of the verses, and of capitalization, especially at the beginning of the verses. This quotation uses the punctuation and capitalization of the original 1611 edition of the KJV.)

The KJV has 23 verses in chapter 14 and 33 verses in chapter 15 of Romans.

Most translations follow KJV (based on Textus Receptus) versification and have Romans 16:25–27 and Romans 14:24–26 do not exist. The WEB bible, however, moves Romans 16:25–27 (end of chapter verses) to Romans 14:24–26 (also end of chapter verses). WEB explains with a footnote in Romans 16:

Textus Receptus places Romans 14:24–26 at the end of Romans instead of at the end of chapter 14, and numbers these verses 16:25–27

=== 2 Corinthians 13:14 ===
For 2 Corinthians 13:14, the KJV has:

^{12}Greet one another with an holy kiss. ^{13}All the saints salute you. ^{14}The grace of the Lord Jesus Christ, and the love of God, and the communion of the Holy Ghost, [be] with you all. Amen.

In some translations, verse 13 is combined with verse 12, leaving verse 14 renumbered as verse 13.

=== 3 John 15 ===
3 John 14–15 ESV are merged as a single verse in the KJV; thus, verse 15 does not exist in the KJV.

The KJV is quoted as having 31,102 verses; the ESV, however, is quoted as having 31,103. This is solely because of this difference. The figure 31,103 is achieved by adding up the last verse for each and every chapter which is why it is impacted by end of chapter differences. The figure 31,103 does not account for the "missing verses" referred to above which are missing mid-chapter. Thus the actual number of verses in the ESV is less than 31,103.

Note that in relation to 2 Corinthians 13:14, another end of chapter anomaly (as opposed to mid-chapter), the ESV and KJV agree.

=== Revelation 12:18 ===
In the KJV, Revelation 12:18 is treated as the first half of 13:1:

And I stood upon the sand of the sea, and saw a beast rise up ...

Some versions, including pre-KJV versions such as the Tyndale Bible, the Geneva Bible, and the Bishops Bible, treat the italicized words as a complete verse and numbered as 12:18, with similar words.

In several modern versions, this is treated as a continuation of 12:17 or as a complete verse numbered 12:18:

- RV: "And he stood upon the sand of the sea." (Some say "it stood" – the he or it being the Dragon mentioned in the preceding verses) Among pre-KJV versions, the Great Bible and the Rheims version also have "he stood".
- Reasons: The earliest resources – including Papyrus 47, Codex Sinaiticus, Codex Alexandrinus, Codex Ephraemi Rescriptus, several minuscules, several Italic manuscripts, the Latin Vulgate, the Armenian and Ethiopic versions, and quotation in some early Church Fathers – support "he stood" (or "it stood"). The KJV and TR follow Codex Porphyrianus (9th century) and a smattering of other (mostly late) resources in reading "I stood". Metzger suggests that the TR text is the result of copyists' assimilation to the verb form in 13:1 ("I saw a beast").

== See also ==
- An Historical Account of Two Notable Corruptions of Scripture
- Authority (textual criticism)
- Bible version debate
- Biblical manuscript
- Categories of New Testament manuscripts
- King James Only movement
- Modern English Bible translations
- Textual criticism
- Textual variants in the New Testament
- Western non-interpolations
- Early translations of the New Testament
