= Washington Adventist University =

Private university in Takoma Park, Maryland, US

- Former names: Washington Training College (1904–1907); Washington Foreign Mission Seminary (1907–1914); Washington Missionary College (1914–1961); Columbia Union College (1961–2009)
- Motto: Gateway to Service
- Type: Private university
- Established: 1904
- Affiliations: CIC; NAICU
- Religious affiliation: Seventh-day Adventist Church
- President: Weymouth Spence
- Students: 695 (Fall 2023)
- Undergraduates: 605 (Fall 2023)
- Location: Takoma Park, Maryland, U.S. 38°59′10″N 77°0′0″W
- Campus: Suburban
- Colors: Navy Blue & Orange
- Nickname: Shock
- Sporting affiliations: NAIA – Independent; USCAA – Independent
- Website: www.wau.edu

Washington Adventist University is a private Seventh-day Adventist university in Takoma Park, Maryland.

== History ==
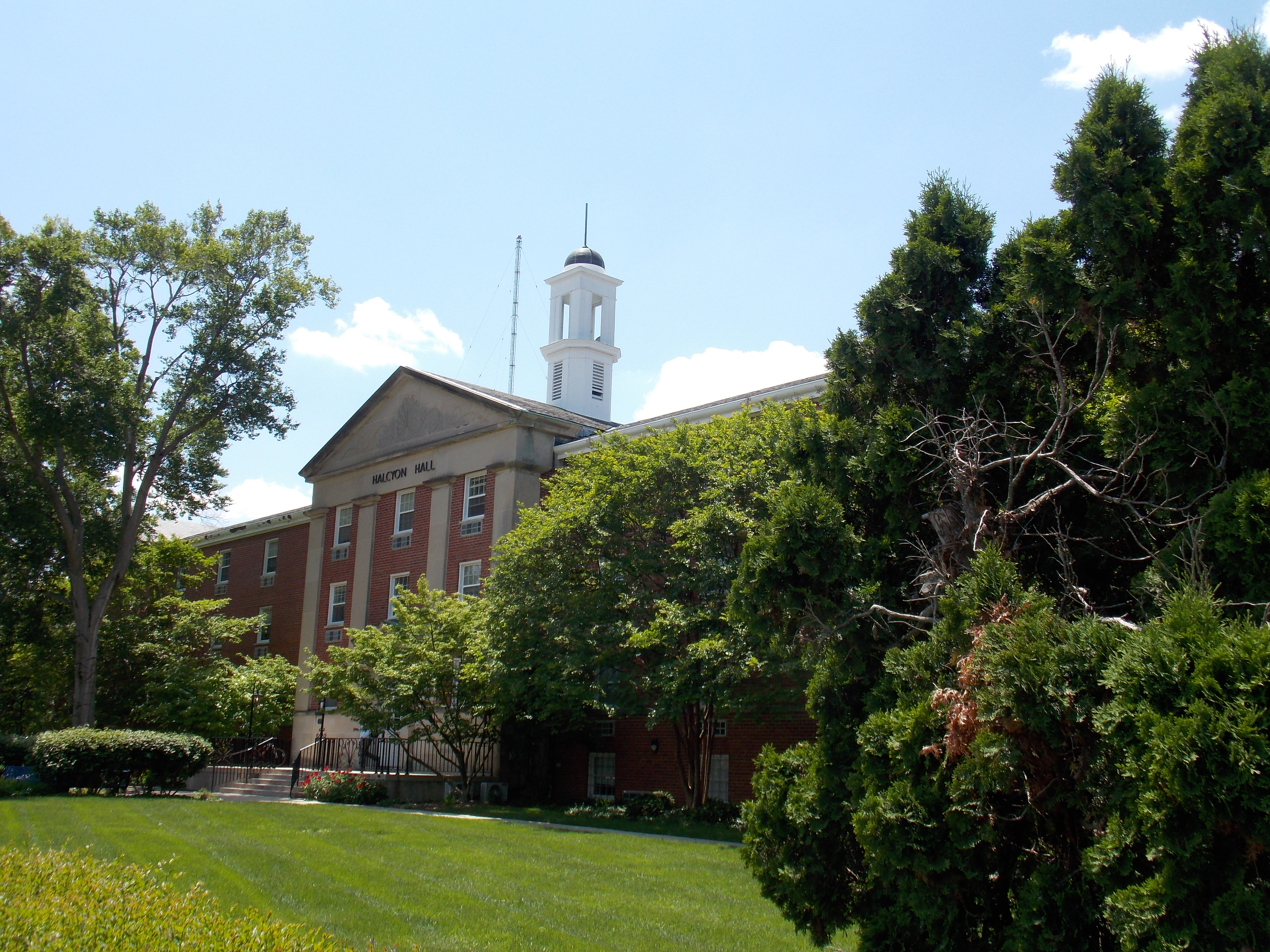
Halcyon Hall

Washington Adventist University was established in 1904 by the Seventh-day Adventist Church as Washington Training College. In 1907, it was renamed Washington Foreign Mission Seminary, in 1914, Washington Missionary College, in 1961, Columbia Union College, and in 2009 received its current name.

In 2007, WAU nearly accepted a $25 million bid for the radio station owned by WAU, WGTS 91.9FM, from American Public Media Group. WGTS listeners and supporters ran multiple campaigns against the sale for months before the board of trustees voted against selling the radio station in September 2007. WAU would have used the sale payment to pay down about $5 million in debts and to increase its endowment of $4 million. The school, which has an enrollment of about 1,000 students, also anticipated that the proceeds would pay for constructing the first new building on campus in 37 years.

In 2008, President Weymouth Spence announced he would eliminate or freeze up to 22 faculty and staff positions in order to restructure the school's curriculum and relieve WAU's multimillion-dollar debt. The announcement came as part of Spence's plan to restructure WAU into a health science-focused institution. As a result, some students and faculty expressed uncertainty and displeasure to local and school-wide media regarding the change in school focus.

== Academics ==
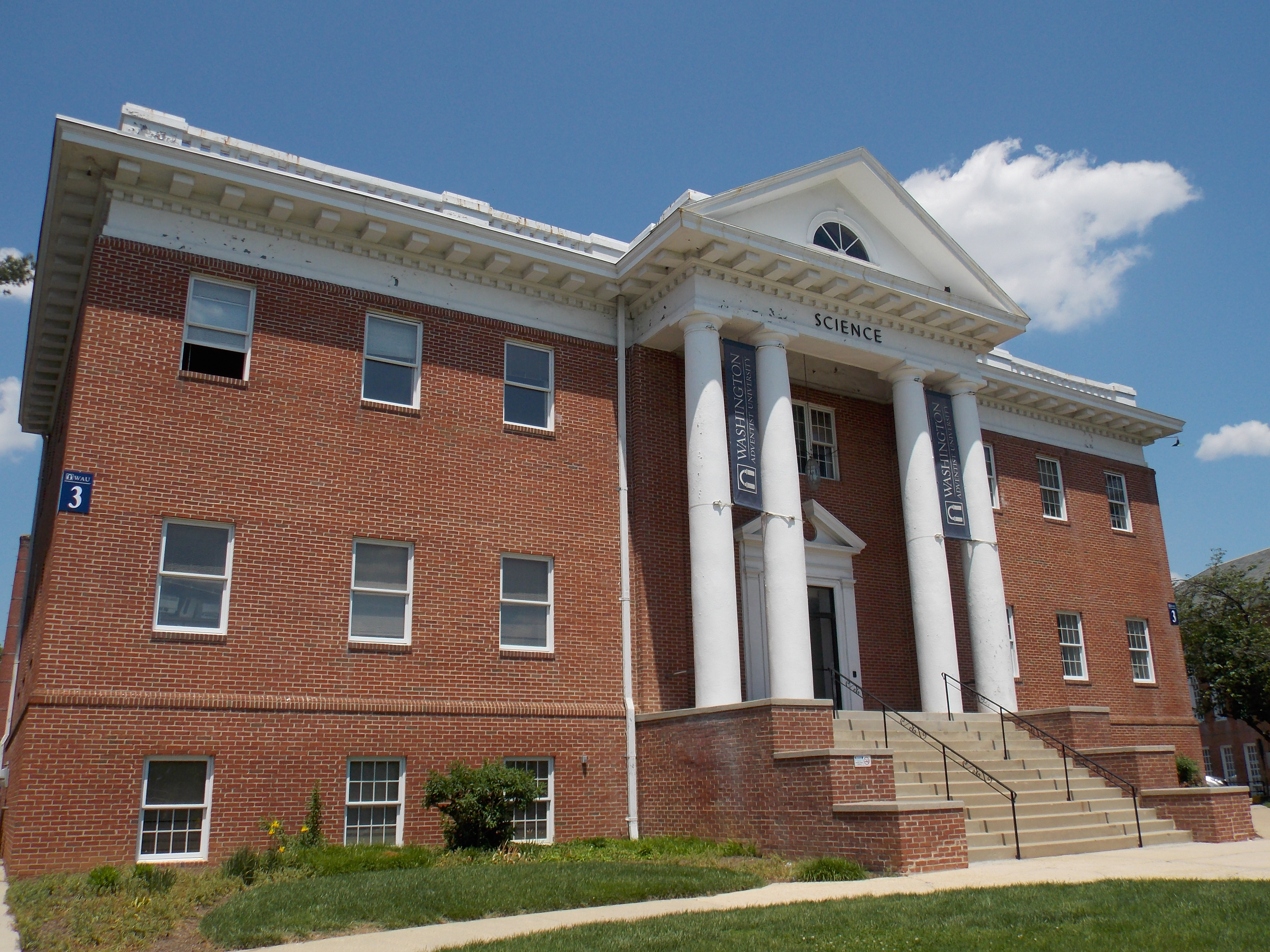
Science Building

WAU is accredited by the Middle States Commission on Higher Education and approved by the Adventist Accrediting Association of the General Conference of Seventh-day Adventists and the Maryland Higher Education Commission. Professional accreditations include the Department of Baccalaureate and Higher Degree Programs of the National League for Nursing, the Commission on Accreditation of Allied Health Education Programs, and the Maryland State Department of Education.

The university offers undergraduate Associate and bachelor's degrees, as well as several certificate programs. Graduate programs include the following: MBA, Masters of Nursing with Business Leadership, Masters in Public Administration, Masters of Religion, and Masters in Psychology. Adult evening courses towards accelerated bachelor's degree programs are also available from the School of Graduate and Professional Services.

The current president of the college is Weymouth Spence, who has announced plans for structural changes to attempt to revitalize the school. The changes are described in detail in a document called The Plan. President Spence succeeded Randal Wisbey, who left in 2007 for La Sierra University. The resident agent is The Corporation Trust, Inc., in Baltimore, MD.

== Student life ==
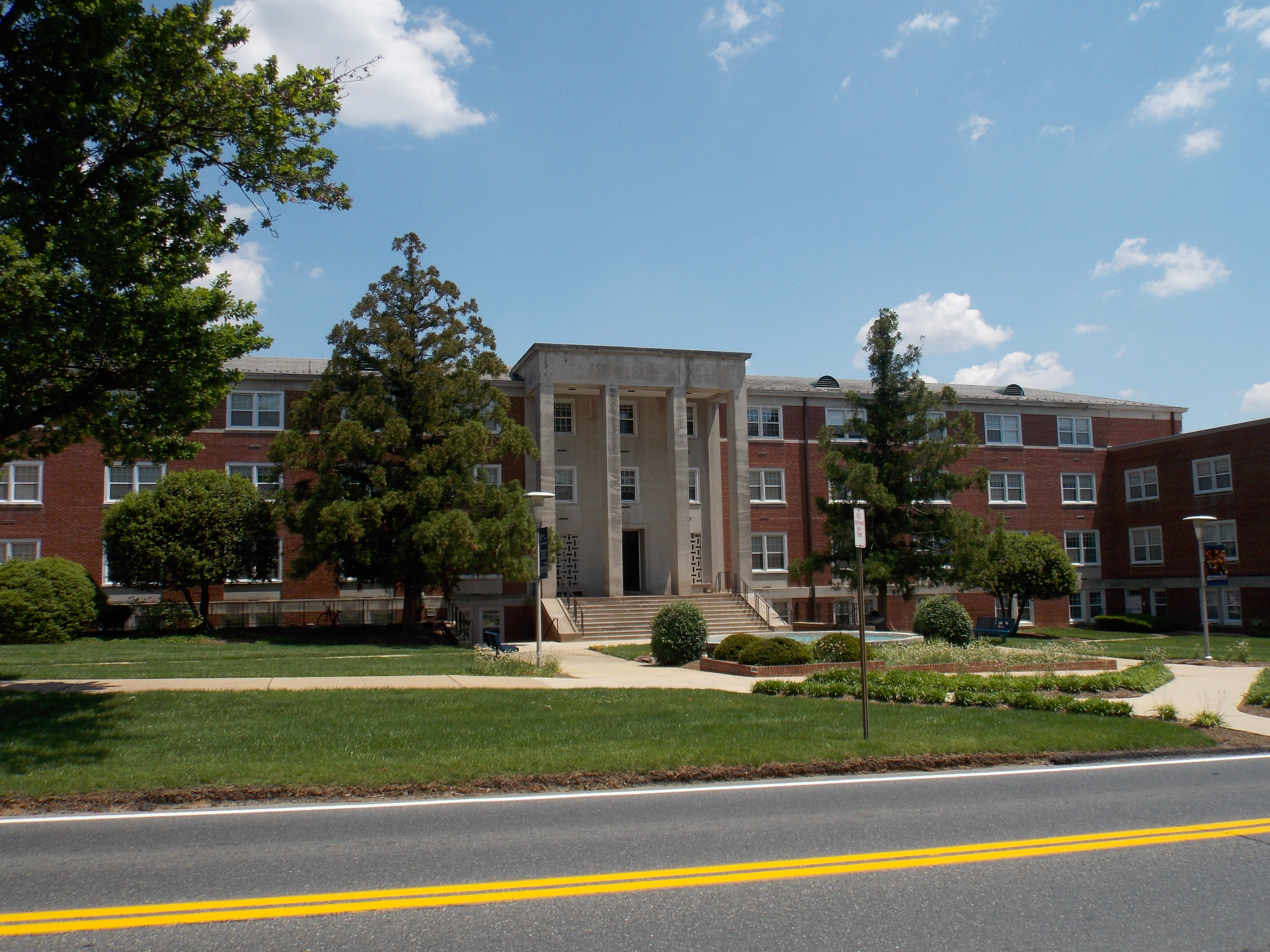
Morrison Hall

The student body is diverse with students attending from a reported 40 states and 47 countries.

WAU has 16 separate student clubs/organizations, including 6 honor societies. WAU is recognized with a premier music department and award-winning music ensembles. The New England Youth Ensemble (NEYE), WAU's resident orchestra, is one of North America's most traveled orchestras. Under the direction of faculty member Preston Hawes, the Carnegie Scholars Program of the NEYE affords qualified students a mentoring relationship with professional musicians of its parent organization, the New England Symphonic Ensemble, the resident orchestra of MidAmerica Productions in New York City. The Music Department features two choral groups, the Columbia Collegiate Chorale, and the elite performing vocal ensemble ProMusic. The Washington Concert Winds holds a yearly band festival where a newly commissioned work, composed specifically for the occasion is premiered each spring semester. The Music Department is housed in a newly constructed building, the Lois and Leroy Peters Music Center.

Other groups include the following:

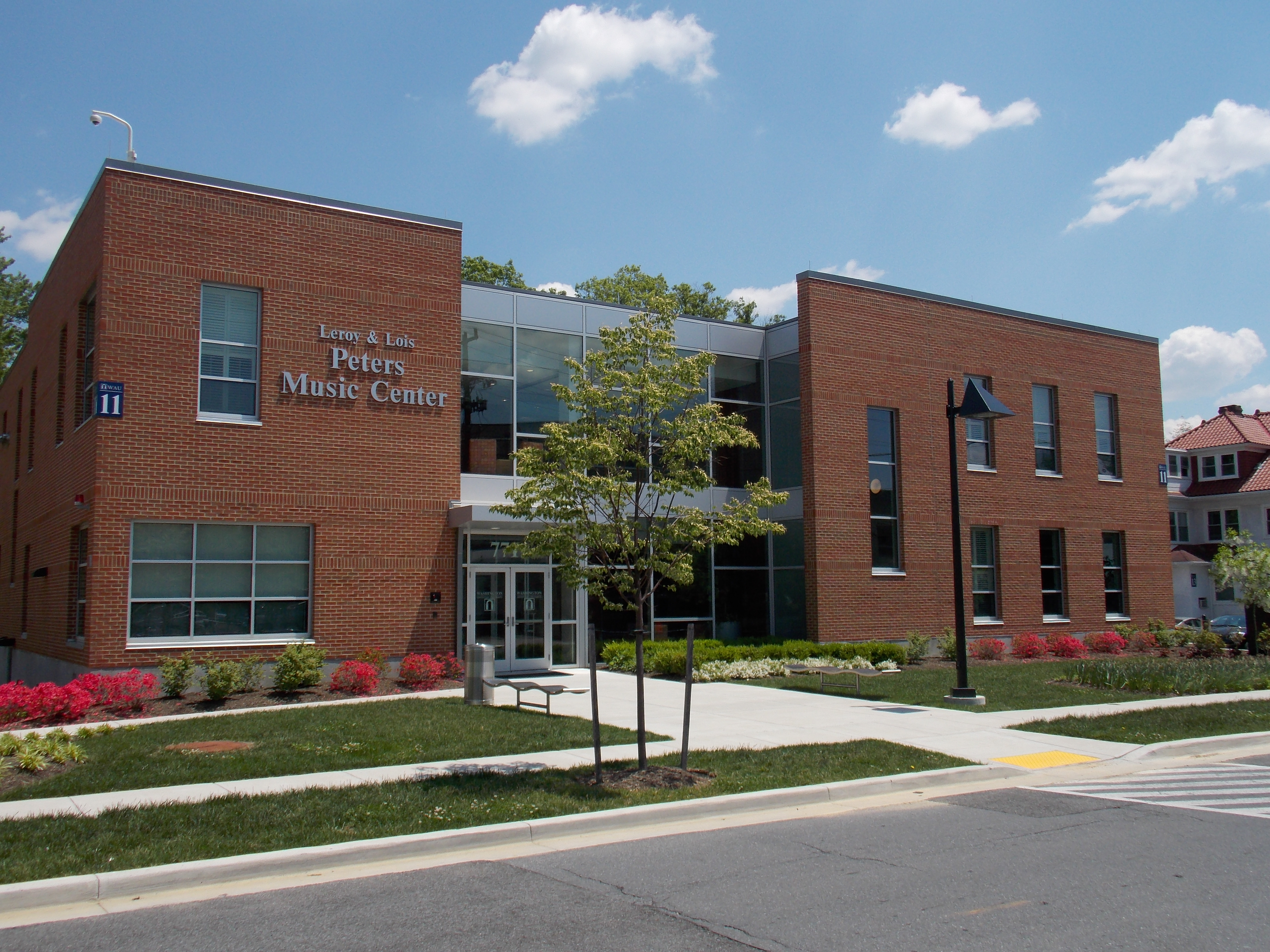
Peters Music Center

- BSU Gospel Choir
- Mock trial team
- Newspaper/college journal
- Ethnic groups
- Political groups
- Social service groups
- Student Association

WAU also features a Sports-Acrobatics Exhibition Team. The Acro-Airs have performed across the country and for a variety of venues. The team does performances at schools and community events where they spread the message of healthy living including abstaining from drugs, alcohol, and tobacco. Washington Adventist University's Acro-Airs also perform half-time shows for NBA games. They have performed at games for the Washington Wizards, Indiana Pacers, New York Knicks, and others. A recent performance was at the "Discover Strathmore Open House 2009", which was sponsored in part by the Ringling Bros. and Barnum & Baily Circus.

The Columbia Journal serves as the campus newspaper.

Many of the student body are members of the Seventh-day Adventist Church, though students of all faiths and belief systems may enroll. Weekly church services are held at the campus church, Sligo Church.

== Athletics ==
The Washington Adventist athletic teams are called the Shock. The university is a member of the National Association of Intercollegiate Athletics (NAIA), primarily competing as an NAIA Independent within the Continental Athletic Conference since the 2014–15 academic year. They also compete as a member of the United States Collegiate Athletic Association (USCAA) since the 2013–14 academic year. The Shock previously competed in the NCAA Division II ranks as an NCAA D-II Independent, which they withdrew from at the end of the 2012–13 school year.

Washington Adventist compete in nine intercollegiate varsity sports: Men's sports include basketball, cross country and soccer; while women's sports include basketball, cross country, softball, soccer and volleyball. The university also houses a showcase acrobatics team known as the Acro-Airs.

=== Intramurals ===
In addition to intercollegiate athletics, WAU offers intramural sports for men and women. Sports facilities and activities are available to students. A volleyball club, fitness club, sports fields, and weight room complement the program.

=== Accomplishments ===
The 2008 men's baseball team won the USCAA National Championship, the first national championship in the school's history. The "Iron Nine" of the Washington Adventist University baseball team played in three national championship games between 2006 and 2009. Along with winning the title in 2008 they have been national runners-up in 2006 and 2009.

=== Withdrawals ===
In recent years, WAU eliminated their men's volleyball program, along with the baseball, softball, and men's and women's track and field program.

== Study abroad opportunities ==
Washington Adventist University co-sponsors Adventist Colleges Abroad, a program in which qualified students study overseas while completing requirements for graduation at Washington Adventist University. This language and cultural immersion is available in eight locations: Argentina, Austria, Brazil, France, Germany, Greece, Italy, and Spain, WAU undergraduate students may also study business courses in England through an exclusive partnership program with Newbold College just outside London, England.

== Notable alumni ==
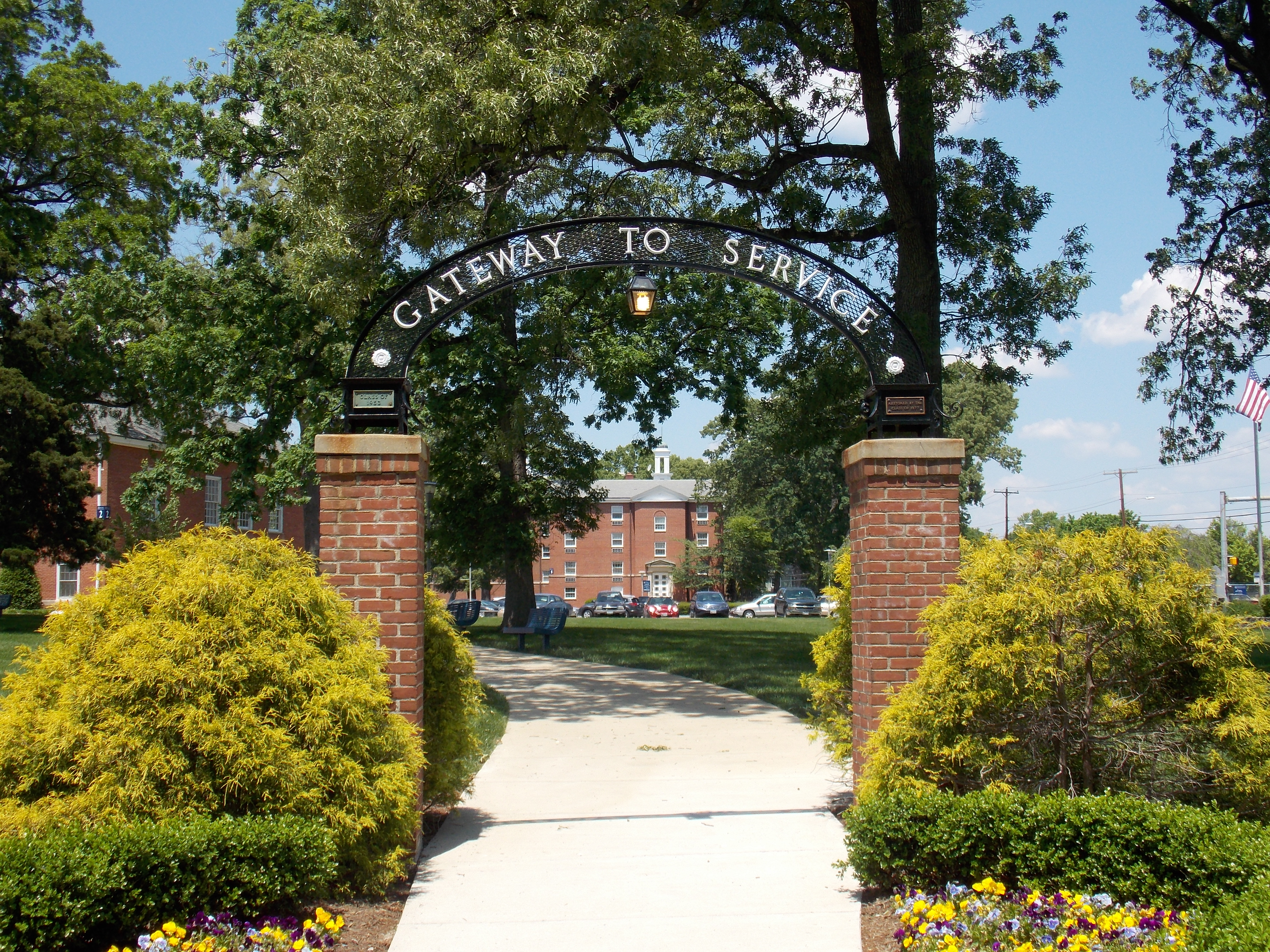
The Gateway on the Commons

- Leonard Lee Bailey – 1964 – pediatric heart surgeon
- Roscoe Bartlett – 1947 – Republican in United States House of Representatives formerly representing Maryland's 6th congressional district
- Hans-Jørgen Holman, Norwegian-American musicologist and educationalist.
- H. M. S. Richards – 1919 – pioneer radio broadcaster and founder of the Voice of Prophecy media ministry
- Rachel Roy – 1996 – fashion designer
- Thomas L. Saaty – 1948 – mathematician and inventor of the Analytic Hierarchy Process
- Nicholas Sarwark – 1998 – Libertarian Party activist
- Benjamin G. Wilkinson – major contributor to the King-James-Only Movement with his book Our Authorized Bible Vindicated
- Ted N. C. Wilson – 1971 – Former world president of the Seventh-day Adventist Church
- Charles F. McMillan – 1977 – tenth director of the Los Alamos National Laboratory

== See also ==
- List of Seventh-day Adventist colleges and universities
- Seventh-day Adventist education
