= Benjamin G. Wilkinson =

Personal details
- Born: 1872 England
- Died: 1968 (aged 95/96)
- Occupation: Seventh-day Adventist Theologian

Benjamin George Wilkinson (1872–1968) was a Seventh-day Adventist missionary, educator, and theologian. He served also as Dean of Theology at the Seventh-day Adventist Washington Missionary College (now known as Washington Adventist University) which is located in Takoma Park, Maryland, near Washington, D.C. Wilkinson is considered one of the originators of the King James Only Movement beliefs.

== Biography ==
Wilkinson is remembered mainly for a book he wrote in 1930 entitled Our Authorized Bible Vindicated, in which he claimed that some new versions of the Bible were based on manuscripts with corruptions introduced into the Septuagint by Origen, and manuscripts with deletions and changes from corrupted Alexandrian text. Some years later Independent Baptist preacher David Otis Fuller wrote a book concerning the Textual debate entitled, Which Bible?, popularizing Wilkinson's assertions and King James Only Movement beliefs.

Wilkinson criticized the English Revised Version, which New Testament was completed in 1881, because he claimed it was translated from inaccurate Greek texts. For example, in Acts 13:42 a change in the Greek text removed the word Gentiles. This was in a verse that requests Paul to preach on the Sabbath. The longer Majority Greek text that was rejected in the ERV is helpful for the Adventist apologetic for Sabbath keeping.

Wilkinson also criticized ERV translations. In Hebrews 9:27 the AV has "But after this, the judgement", the ERV "after this cometh judgement". Wilkinson supported the article inclusion with references to Middleton, Edmund Beckett and Canon Farrar. The AV text is considered more compatible with the Adventist belief in 'soul sleep' while Wilkinson, from Farrar, asserted that the ERV text would support the 'intermediate state' belief.

Wilkinson criticized Westcott and Hort, believing they made changes to the text used in translation. Due to the fact that they rejected the use of the Textus Receptus and instead used their revised Greek text based mainly on the Codex Vaticanus and Codex Sinaiticus. Those who preferred not to use the Textus Receptus, such as Westcott and Hort, used what Wilkinson claimed were corrupted manuscripts. Similarly, an earlier writer on the textual issues, John Burgon, called it a "fabricated text", and "among the most corrupt documents extant" and likened the primary manuscripts used, the Codex Vaticanus and the Codex Sinaiticus, to the "two false witnesses" of Matthew 26:60. The Codex Vaticanus that has come down to us had portions which have been collated and changed or edited by several scribes over the centuries, with many exclusions and errors that were intended to be corrections made in the process, while the Codex Sinaiticus has known textual variants in its text and exclusions.

In his book Truth Triumphant, Wilkinson painted a true church after Jesus' ascension in the face of apostasy and persecution, fled into the wilderness, preserved the Word of God and teaching of Jesus. The true church manifested during the Reformation, bringing in long lost teachings of the Bible that was forbidden during the Dark Ages, and that she will triumph over the beast and its image in the last days.

Wilkinson was a participant in the 1919 Bible Conference a highly significant event for the Adventist Church. The meetings included discussions on the nature of inspiration, both of the Bible and Seventh-day Adventist prophetess Ellen G. White. Wilkinson was a representative of the conservative faction, arguing that White's writings were inerrant. Other leaders such as A. G. Daniells, the president of the General Conference, disagreed and ascribed inerrancy solely to the Bible.

Adventists who today use the King James Version do not necessarily support the King James Only movement. Many Adventists use other English language versions of the Bible, and the denomination does not recommend any particular one.

Wilkinson Hall, the main administrative building on Washington Adventist University's campus, is named in Benjamin Wilkinson's honor.

== See also ==
- Seventh-day Adventist theology
- Our Authorized Bible Vindicated
- Bible version debate
- Revised Version
- Seventh-day Adventist eschatology
- History of the Seventh-day Adventist Church
- 28 Fundamental Beliefs
- Prophecy in the Seventh-day Adventist Church
- Investigative judgment
- Pillars of Adventism
- Second Coming
- Conditional Immortality
- Historicism
- Three Angels' Messages
- Sabbath in seventh-day churches
- Ellen G. White
- Seventh-day Adventist worship
