= Our Authorized Bible Vindicated =

1930 book by Benjamin G. Wilkinson

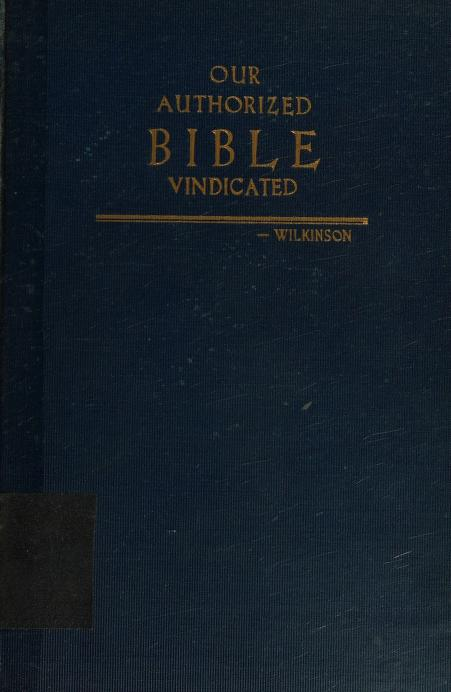
- Author: Benjamin G. Wilkinson
- Language: English
- Subject: King James Only movement
- Publication date: 1930

Our Authorized Bible Vindicated is a book written by Seventh-day Adventist scholar Benjamin G. Wilkinson advocating the King James Only (KJO) position, published in 1930. It asserted that some of the new versions of the Bible coming out, came from manuscripts with corruptions introduced into the Septuagint with additional texts, which came to be called "Apocrypha", and manuscripts with deletions and changes from corrupted Alexandrian text brought in by manuscript readings in the Greek New Testament adopted by Brooke Foss Westcott and Fenton John Anthony Hort. While King James Only movement advocacy existed prior to the writing of this book, many of the arguments in the book have since become set talking-points of many who support the belief, thanks in large part to Baptist Fundamentalist preacher David Otis Fuller, who adopted them into much of his own material, such as the book, Which Bible?.

== Arguments made in the book ==
Among the assertions the book helped propagate in support of the Authorized King James Version were arguments against Brooke Westcott and Fenton Hort, arguments that corruptions were introduced into the Septuagint by Origen, a belief in two textual streams (the "pure" Antiochian (Byzantine) text, and the "bad" Alexandrian text), a belief in the superiority of the Textus Receptus for the New Testament and the Masoretic Text for the Old Testament, and so on.Those who preferred not to use the Textus Receptus, such as Westcott and Hort, used what Wilkinson claimed were corrupted manuscripts and which other authorities on the textual issue such as John Burgon, called it a "fabricated text", and "among the most corrupt documents extant" and likens the manuscripts used as to the "two false witnesses" of Matthew 26:60 the Codex Vaticanus and the Codex Sinaiticus. The Codex Vaticanus that has come down to us had portions which have been collated and changed or edited by several scribes over the centuries, with many exclusions and errors that were intended to be corrections made in the process, while the Codex Sinaiticus has known textual variants in its text and exclusions.

As can be seen in the book, Wilkinson claims that the Old Latin version, instead of the Vulgate, was the Bible of the medieval Waldensians and that the Old Latin corresponds textually with the Greek Textus Receptus. The Textus Receptus constituted the translation base for the original German Luther Bible, for the translation of the New Testament into English by William Tyndale, the King James Version, and for most other Reformation era New Testament translations throughout Western and Central Europe.

== See also ==
- Bible version debate
- List of Bible verses not included in modern translations
- Modern English Bible translations
- Textual criticism
- Trinitarian Bible Society
