= David Otis Fuller =

American pastor and author (1903–1988)

David Otis Fuller (November 20, 1903 – February 21, 1988) was an American Baptist pastor. He was a graduate of Wheaton College in Wheaton, Illinois and Princeton Theological Seminary. He pastored Chelsea Baptist Church in Atlantic City, New Jersey and the Wealthy Street Baptist Church in Grand Rapids, Michigan.

== Biography ==
In April 1916 when he was 13 years old, Fuller became a Christian at a Chapman-Alexander (John Wilbur Chapman and Charles Alexander) revival meeting in North Carolina and was baptized in the First Baptist Church of New York City by Dr. I. M. Haldeman. The title of the sermon he heard that day was "What Wilt Thou Say When He Shall Punish Thee."

Fuller served as a United States Navy chaplain in World War II, then for the next 45 years he was a pastor in a civilian capacity. He served as the editor of the General Association of Regular Baptists' "Baptist Bulletin" for 50 years.

He was the founder of Cornerstone University in Grand Rapids (at the time named Baptist Bible Institute), serving as president from 1941 to 1944 and was the founder and president of the "Which Bible?" Society.

Fuller helped establish the Children's Bible Hour in 1942, where he was chairman for 33 years. He also was on the board of the Association of Baptists for World Evangelism (ABWE) for 52 years.

Fuller dedicated much of his life to the defense of the Byzantine text-type as embodied in the Textus Receptus and, largely, the King James Version.

In February 1988, Fuller died at the Blodgett Memorial Medical Center in Grand Rapids, Michigan.

== Published works ==
Fuller's three volumes on the subject of texts and versions contain the full or summarized works of many older authorities on the textual issue. The most notable influence being Benjamin G. Wilkinson. Others include John Burgon, Herman C. Hoskier, Philip Mauro, Joseph Philpot, Samuel Zwemer, and George Sayles Bishop, as well as the works of a number of contemporary writers, including Edward Hills, Terence Brown, and Wilbur Pickering.

The Baptist researcher Doug Kutilek in his article The Unlearned Men has traced some of what Fuller wrote in his book, Which Bible? to the discussion of the textual debate in Our Authorized Bible Vindicated by Seventh-day Adventist scholar Benjamin G. Wilkinson.

=== Books ===
- Valiant for the Truth: a Treasury of Evangelical Writings. McGraw-Hill Book Company, 1961 (1st ed.). ISBN 0825426138, 9780825426131
- Which Bible? Grand Rapids: Grand Rapids International Publications, 1970. 3rd ed. 1972. ISBN 0-944355-24-2
- True or False? The Westcott-Hort Textual Theory Examined Grand Rapids: Grand Rapids International Publications, 1973. ISBN 0-944355-12-9
- Counterfeit or Genuine? Grand Rapids: Grand Rapids International Publications, 1978. ISBN 0-8254-2615-4

== See also ==
- King-James-Only Movement
- Bible version debate
