= Barden Corporation =

US-based ball bearing manufacturer

- Type: Private
- Founded: 1942
- Headquarters: Danbury, Connecticut, United States
- Key people: Maria-Elisabeth Schaeffler-Thumann
- Parent: HQW Precision GmbH
- Website: bardenbearings.com

Barden Corporation is a ball bearing manufacturer based in Danbury, Connecticut, USA with factories in Danbury, Winsted, Connecticut and in Plymouth, England. It previously had factories in Bridgeport, Connecticut (Lacey Manufacturing-divested in 2008) and Haverhill, Massachusetts (Pope Spindle-divested in 2003).

Barden specializes in the design, manufacture, repair and overhaul of aerospace and super precision ball bearings for safety-critical and harsh environment applications in a broad range of market sectors, from space to aerospace to subsea to high performance machine tools to medical and high performance automotive applications.

HQW/Barden products at 9th Bengaluru Space Expo 2026, BIEC

== History ==
Barden was founded by Theodore Barth and Carl Norden (hence the name "Bar-den") in 1942 to make precision ball bearings for the Norden bombsight. The Norden bombsight required 61 precision miniature and instrument type bearings. Prior to the US entry into World War II, bombsight production levels were planned to be 800 per month; however after the Japanese attack on Pearl Harbor, production was ramped up and reached roughly 2000 units per month by the close of 1943. The precision level of the bearings required for the bombsight to operate was not available in the domestic bearing industry, driving the creation of Barden. Even during the Cold War, Barden bearings would continue to be used on key weapon systems and platforms.

During various growth spurts, Barden Corporation acquired companies that supported the Barden bearing manufacturing business. These included companies like EMO (later renamed Barden UK-allowed entry into the European Market), Winsted Precision Ball Company (bearing rolling elements), Pope Spindle (precision bearings supported machine tools), Lacey Manufacturing(rolling element retainer/cages and other bearing components), and American Powdered Metals of North Haven, Connecticut.

After severe flooding in the Danbury area in the 1950s, Barden Corporation was re-located from downtown Danbury on East Franklin Street in what had previously been a hat factory to its current location overlooking the Danbury Airport.

== Corporate structure ==
Barden is a member of the multinational Schaeffler Group, which specializes in bearing technologies and precision products for aerospace, industrial plant and automotive industries. Schaeffler is headquartered in Herzogenaurach, Germany, and oversees three main brands: FAG, INA and LUK. The group has approximately 61,000 employees at more than 180 locations worldwide, recording consolidated sales of approximately $10 bn for 2009.

=== Barden Corporation ===
The Barden headquarters is located approximately sixty miles from New York City and is the home office of the CEO of Schaeffler Aerospace. Barden Corporation resides in the North American organizational region of Schaeffler Group and is organized under Schaeffler Technologies GmbH & Co. KG. The Schaeffler Aerospace division also includes FAG Aerospace, Incorporated, of Stratford, Ontario and FAG Aerospace GmbH of Schweinfurt, Germany.

=== The Barden Corporation (UK) Ltd ===
Barden UK started life in 1947 as EMO Instrumentation. The founders, Bill Spencer and Stan Hensby, had several years of experience working in the Sperry Brentford gyro factory, cultivating their expertise in precision instrument bearings. After years of expansion, The Barden Corporation (US) purchased EMO Instrumentation and established The Barden Corporation (UK) Ltd in 1961. An ironic twist to the purchase was that Barden was created to supply bearings for a competing bombsight (Norden) with the Sperry product. The company relocated to Bracknell Berkshire until it moved to Plymouth on the South West coast of England in 1977 before being purchased by FAG in 1991 and then becoming part of the FAG Aerospace and Super Precision Division in 1994. The Division was acquired by INA-Schaeffler in 2001, becoming part of the Schaeffler Group. In June 2019 The Barden Corporation (UK) Ltd was acquired by HQW Precision GmbH, a precision bearing manufacturer based in Kürnach, Germany. The two companies operate as 'Partners in Precision' within the super precision ball bearing sector.

=== Winsted Precision Ball Company ===
In addition to the Danbury and Plymouth locations, Barden has a subsidiary in northwestern Connecticut, Winsted Precision Ball Company, a rolling element factory. The Winsted Precision Ball Company was founded in 1949 with the sole purpose of manufacturing high-precision balls for the use in miniature precision ball bearings. Acquired by Barden Corporation in the 1960s, WPBC is not a separate legal entity, but a department of the Barden Corporation's Danbury location. Today, WPBC is one of the leading manufacturers of ABMA (American Bearing Manufacturers Association) Grade 3, 5, and 10 balls in the U.S.

=== FAG Aerospace ===
Barden Corporation was acquired by FAG in 1990. The irony of the acquisition by FAG was that Barden Precision Bearings had been used to make the Norden bombsight operate and facilitated destruction of the Schweinfurt bearing factories during World War II. In 2001, FAG was acquired INA-Holdings/Schaeffler KG (Schaeffler Gruppe). FAG is an acronym for Friedrich Fischer Aktien-Gesellschaft or Fischer AG which translates to Fischer Stock Company.

Friedrich Fischer invented the ball grinding machine 1883 for mass production of steel balls that allowed for broad use of ball bearings. FAG was trademarked in 1905.

== Products ==
Traditional Barden products are predominantly radial, single row, super precision angular contact (separable and nonseparable) and deep groove ball bearings. Bearings are classified as either instrument or spindle bearings, and are made to exacting ABEC-7 or ABEC-9 specifications. Barden also sells ball screw support bearings, cylindrical roller bearings and double direction angular contact thrust ball bearings.

Barden super precision bearings come in inch or metric dimensions with diameters ranging from 3/8" (9.5mm) O.D. up to 15 3/4" (400mm) O.D. A variety of seals, shields and metallic/nonmetallic cage designs and calibration options are available to satisfy most precision bearing requirements.

Because of the precision levels and applications that Barden Precision Bearings are used in, availability is limited because of US EAR, DFARS and ITAR regulations, with many of the bearing products coming under the US Munitions Listings. Additionally, international players of dubious motivations frequently attempt to bypass export restrictions by utilizing unsuspecting distributors of bearings who become unwitting accomplices in violation of export laws.

Because of the value and availability of Barden bearings, counterfeiting is not an uncommon occurrence. Although the counterfeit product may be difficult to identify in packaging or in appearance, once placed in the application, because of the low precision of the counterfeit product, performance issues usually surface with the application. The performance usually gives away and readily identifies the counterfeit bearing.
