= Wealthy Park Baptist Church =

- Wealthy Park Baptist Church
- Location: Grand Rapids, Michigan
- Country: United States
- Denomination: General Association of Regular Baptist Churches
- Website: wealthypark.org

History
- Former name: Wealthy Street Baptist Church
- Events: Permanently closed in 2018.

Wealthy Park Baptist Church was an American church, located in Grand Rapids, Michigan, established in 1886. It had previously been a Sunday school mission of Fountain Street Baptist Church started in 1875.

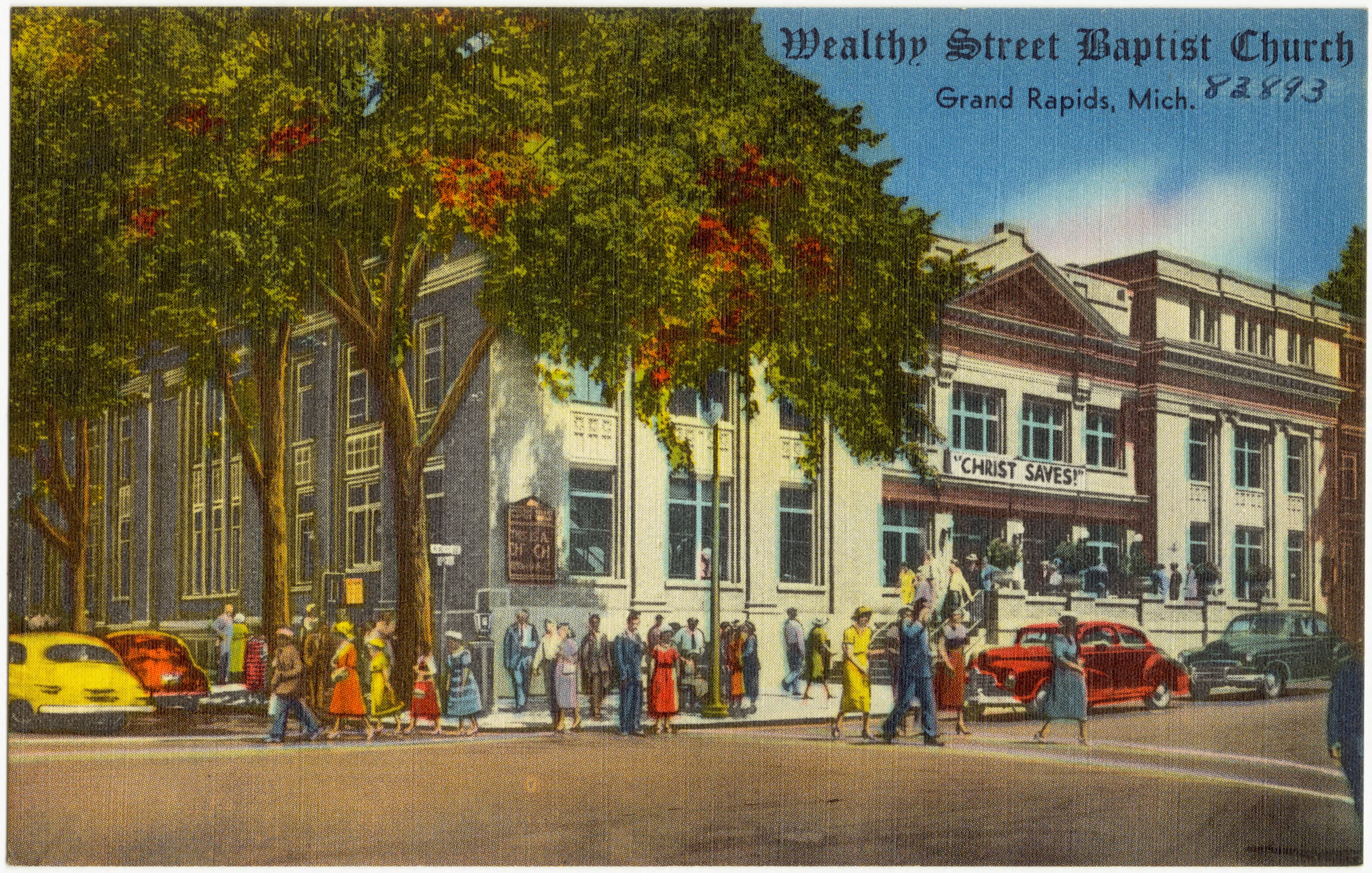
Wealthy Street Church

The church was originally known as the Wealthy Street Baptist Church before moving to the suburbs. The congregation called Oliver Willis Van Osdel to become its pastor in 1909. Van Osdel had pastored the church years before, but when the congregation refused to follow his lead and erect a new building, he had left for Spokane, Washington. Upon returning to Wealthy Street, Van Osdel led the church through the construction of the new building in 1912. He also made Wealthy Street into one of the capitals of the fundamentalist movement. Van Osdel was one of the founders of the General Association of Regular Baptist Churches.

The church was pastored for forty years by the Rev. Dr. David Otis Fuller, a King James Only movement proponent.

It was the birthplace to Grand Rapids Baptist College, a predecessor to what is now called Cornerstone University, and served as its home from 1941 to 1964.

The church moved to Michigan Street in the 1980s, purchasing a school building and adding on to it.

In 2001, after struggling with declining membership, the church called Pastor Kenton Young. During his 14 years of ministry he and his wife renewed the heart of the church, stabilizing its membership, as well as shaping the congregation into a close family of believers. Pastor Young also saw to it that the church would be prepared for a smooth transition upon his retirement, hiring and mentoring an assistant pastor, William J. Swem, who would be called by the congregation to fill the position of pastor in 2015.

In 2018, Wealthy Park Baptist Church was closed, and the property sold. The remaining members, under the leadership of Pastor William J. Swem, felt led of the Lord to start over completely, and planted a new independent Baptist church in Plainfield Township, meeting for several months in a school building before finally settling in to a new location on Woodworth St, just off of Plainfield Avenue. The new church is simply named, Plainfield Baptist Church.
