= Bible version debate =

Debate concerning the proper Bible version to use

There have been various debates concerning the proper family of biblical manuscripts and translation techniques that should be used to translate the Bible into other languages. Biblical translation has been employed since the first translations were made from the Hebrew Bible (Biblical Hebrew and Biblical Aramaic) into Greek (see Septuagint) and Aramaic (see Targum). Until the Late Middle Ages, the Western Church used the Latin Vulgate almost entirely, while the Eastern Church, centered in Constantinople, mostly used the Greek Byzantine text. Beginning in the 14th century, there have been increasing numbers of vernacular translations into various languages. With the development of modern printing techniques, these increased enormously.

The English King James Version or "Authorized Version", published in 1611, has been one of the most debated English versions. Many supporters of the King James Version are disappointed with the departure from this translation to newer translations that use the critical text instead of the Byzantine text as the base text. There have also been debates regarding the benefits of formal translations over dynamic equivalence translations. Supporters of formal translation such as the King James Version criticize translations that use dynamic equivalence on the grounds that accuracy is compromised, since this technique tends to reword the text instead of translating it more literally in a word-for-word fashion. Additionally, these supporters are critical of translations using the critical text because they believe that biblical text has been deliberately deleted from the original autographs. Debates of this type involve theological concepts as well as translation techniques, which are outlined in the process of textual criticism.

== The first King James Version debate ==
Following the execution of William Tyndale in 1536, there existed a complete translation of the New Testament from Greek into English for the first time, and in several editions. From this point on, with the English Reformation in full swing, other publications of English translations began to appear, often with sponsorship from businessmen on the continent (e.g., Jacob van Meteren for the Coverdale Bible). The most notable of these were the Great Bible, the Bishops' Bible, and the Geneva Bible.

The Great Bible, first published in 1539, was the only English Bible whose use was made compulsory in churches throughout England. The Geneva Bible (1557) became the "Bible of the Puritans" and made an enormous impression on English Bible translation, second only to Tyndale. Part of this was due to its issue as a small book, an octavo size; part due to the extensive commentary; and part due to the work and endorsement of John Calvin and Theodore Beza, two of the most important continental Christian theologians of the Reformation.

The politics of the time were such that there was a marked frustration between the clergy of the continent and the clergy of England; there already was a formally accepted Great Bible used in the church, but the Geneva Bible was enormously popular. This sparked in the mind of both Elizabeth I and especially in Canterbury the concept of revising the Great Bible. The resulting Bishops' Bible never superseded the popularity of the Geneva Bible—partly due to its enormous size, being even larger than the Great Bible.

Thus, it is clear that there were marked problems for the English monarchy and for Canterbury, both of whom wanted a united Church of England. Each faction appeared to have its own version: the exiled Catholics had the Douay-Rheims Version, the Puritans had the Geneva Bible, and the official book for Canterbury was the Bishops' Bible. Enter then James I, the first Scot to sit on the English throne.

James I began his reign in the hope that he could reconcile the huge Puritan/Anglican divide—a divide that was as much political as it was religious. This attempt was embodied by the Hampton Court Conference (1604), during which a Puritan from Oxford noted the imperfections of the current Bible versions. The idea of a new translation appealed to King James, and the translation task was delegated to the universities, rather than to Canterbury, in order to keep the translation as clean as possible.

Thus, it should be seen as no surprise that it took some time for the translation to be accepted by all. Further, it was never, at least on record, as promised by James I, royally proclaimed as the Bible of the Church of England.

== King James Version defenders ==
Some Christian fundamentalists believe that the King James Version is the only version of the Bible English speakers should use due to the conclusion that corruptions are present in the other translations. Some who follow this belief have formed a King James Only movement. Similarly, some non-English speakers prefer translations based upon the Textus Receptus, or "Received Text", instead of the Alexandrian text edited by Wescott and Hort in 1881. Proponents of this belief system point to verses such as Ps. 12:6-7, Matt. 24:35, and others, claiming that "perfect preservation" was promised, often basing this reasoning on the fact that these verses utilize the plural form "words", supposedly indicating that it is more than merely "the word" that will be preserved. The issue also extends to which edition is being used, particularly the Pure Cambridge Edition.

Most biblical scholars, however, believe that knowledge of ancient Hebrew and Greek has improved over the centuries. Coupled with advances in the fields of textual criticism, biblical archaeology, and linguistics, this has enabled the creation of more accurate translations, whichever texts are chosen as the basis.

== Types of translation ==
In translating any ancient text, a translator must determine how literal the translation should be. Translations may tend to be formal equivalents (e.g., literal), tend to be free translations (dynamic equivalence), or even be a paraphrase. In practice, translations can be placed on a spectrum along these points; the following subsections show how these differences affect translations of the Bible.

=== Formal equivalence ===
A literal translation tries to remain as close to the original text as possible, without adding the translators' ideas and thoughts into the translation. Thus, the argument goes, the more literal the translation is, the less danger there is of corrupting the original message. This is therefore much more of a word-for-word view of translation. The problem with this form of translation is that it assumes a moderate degree of familiarity with the subject matter on the part of the reader. The New American Standard Bible (NASB or NAS), King James Version (KJV), Modern Literal Version (MLV), American Standard Version (ASV), and Revised Standard Version (RSV) and their offshoots, including the New Revised Standard Version (NRSV) and English Standard Version (ESV), are – to differing degrees—examples of this kind of translation. For example, most printings of the KJV italicize words that are implied but are not actually in the original source text, since words must sometimes be added to have valid English grammar. Thus, even a formal equivalence translation has at least some modification of sentence structure and regard for contextual usage of words. One of the most literal translations in English is the aptly named Young's Literal Translation: in this version, John 3:16 reads: "For God did so love the world, that His Son—the only begotten—He gave, that every one who is believing in him may not perish, but may have life age-during," which is very stilted and ungrammatical in English, although it maintains more of the tense and word order of the original Greek.

=== Dynamic equivalence ===
A dynamic equivalence (free) translation tries to clearly convey the thoughts and ideas of the source text. A literal translation, it is argued, may obscure the intention of the original author. A free translator attempts to convey the subtleties of context and subtext in the work, so that the reader is presented with both a translation of the language and the context. The New Living Translation (NLT) is an example of a translation that uses dynamic equivalence. The New International Version (NIV) attempts to strike a balance between dynamic and formal equivalence.

=== Functional equivalence ===
A functional equivalence, or thought-for-thought, translation goes even further than dynamic equivalence and attempts to give the meaning of entire phrases, sentences, or even passages rather than individual words. While necessarily less precise, functional equivalence can be a more accurate translation method for certain passages, e.g., passages with ancient idioms that a modern reader would not pick up on. Paraphrases are typically not intended for in-depth study, but are instead intended to put the basic message of the Bible into language which could be readily understood by the typical reader without a theological or linguistic background. The Message Bible is an example of this kind of translation. The Living Bible is a paraphrase in the sense of rewording an English translation, rather than a translation using the functional equivalence method.

=== Contrast of formal and dynamic equivalence ===
Those who prefer formal equivalence believe that a literal translation is better since it is closer to the structure of the original; those who prefer dynamic equivalence suggest that a freer translation is better since it more clearly communicates the meaning of the original. Those who prefer formal equivalence also argue that some ambiguity of the original text is usually ironed out by the translators; some of the interpretation work is already done.

== Source text ==
Another key issue in translating the Bible is selecting the source text. The Bible far predates printing presses, so every book had to be copied by hand for many centuries. Every copy introduced the risk of error. Thus, a key step in performing a translation is to establish what the original text was, typically by comparing extant copies. This process is called textual criticism.

Textual criticism of the Old Testament (Hebrew Bible) centers on the comparison of the manuscript versions of the Masoretic Text to early witnesses such as the Septuagint, the Vulgate, the Samaritan Pentateuch, various Syriac texts, and the biblical texts of the Dead Sea Scrolls.

The New Testament has been preserved in more manuscripts than any other ancient work, creating a challenge in handling so many different texts when performing these comparisons. The King James Version (or Authorized Version) was based on the Textus Receptus, an eclectic Greek text prepared by Erasmus based primarily on Byzantine text Greek manuscripts, which make up the majority of existing copies of the New Testament.

The majority of New Testament textual critics now favor a text that is Alexandrian in complexion, especially after the publication of Westcott and Hort's edition. There remain some proponents of the Byzantine text-type as the type of text most similar to the autographs. These include the editors of the Hodges and Farstad text and the Robinson and Pierpoint text.

== Gender in Bible translation ==
There have been a number of books and articles written about how and whether to indicate gender in translating the Bible. The topic is broad and not always discussed irenically. A number of recent Bible translations have taken a variety of steps to deal with current moves to prescribe changes related to gender marking in English; like the New Revised Standard Version (NRSV), the New Century Version (NCV), Contemporary English Version (CEV) and Today's New International Version (TNIV). In Jewish circles the Jewish Publication Society's translation the New Jewish Publication Society Tanakh (NJPS) is the basis for The Contemporary Torah: A Gender-Sensitive Adaptation of the JPS Translation (CJPS). Gender inclusivity is used in varying degrees by different translations.

== See also ==
- List of major textual variants in the New Testament
- List of Bible verses not included in modern translations
