= Hort (surname) =

Hort is a surname. Notable people with the surname include:

- Erik Hort (born 1987), American soccer player
- F. J. A. Hort (1828–1892), Irish theologian
- Greta Hort (1903–1967), Danish-born literature professor
- Josiah Hort (c. 1674–1751), English clergyman of the Church of Ireland
- Vlastimil Hort (1944–2025), Czech-German chess Grandmaster
- Hort baronets, a title in the Baronetage of Great Britain
  - Sir Josiah Hort, 2nd Baronet (1791–1876)
  - Sir Arthur Hort, 6th Baronet (1864–1935), Author, schoolmaster, and gardener

== See also ==
- Hurt (surname)
- Hart (surname)
