= Lectionary 310 =

11th century Greek manuscript of the New Testament

Lectionary ℓ 310
- New Testament manuscript
- Text: Evangelistarium †
- Date: 11th century
- Script: Greek
- Found: 1876
- Now at: Cambridge University Library
- Size: 24 cm by 15.5 cm
- Type: Byzantine text-type

Lectionary 310 (Gregory-Aland), designated by siglum ℓ 310 (in the Gregory-Aland numbering) is a Greek manuscript of the New Testament, on parchment. Palaeographically it has been assigned to the 11th century. The manuscript has survived in a fragmentary condition.

== Description ==
The original codex contained lessons from the Gospels (Evangelistarium), on 4 parchment leaves, with some lacunae. The leaves are measured (24 cm by 15.5 cm). It has musical notes. Many leaves at the end and some leaves inside were lost

The text is written in Greek minuscule letters, in two columns per page, 25 lines per page.

The codex contains lessons, which were red for sixth Saturday in Lent (John 11:41), Palm Sunday (John 12:11), part of Matins (from Matthew 21:36) and Vespers (to Matthew 24:26), for Monday in Holy Week.

== History ==
Gregory and Scrivener dated the manuscript to the 11th or 12th century. It is presently assigned by the INTF to the 11th century.

It belonged to the Tischendorf's collection. It was bought from Tischendorf's family for the university in 1876.

The manuscript was added to the list of New Testament manuscripts by Scrivener (296^{e}) and Caspar René Gregory (number 310^{e}). It was examined by Hort. Gregory saw it in 1883.

Currently the codex is housed at the Cambridge University Library (MS Add.1879.12) in Cambridge.

== See also ==
- List of New Testament lectionaries
- Biblical manuscript
- Textual criticism
- Lectionary 309
- Lectionary 311

== Bibliography ==
- Gregory, Caspar René (1900). Textkritik des Neuen Testaments. Vol. 1. Leipzig: J.C. Hinrichs’sche Buchhandlung. p. 414.
