= Hurt (surname) =

Hurt is an English surname. Notable people with the surname include:

== People ==
- Byron Hurt (born 1969), American film director
- Charles Hurt (born 1971), American columnist
- Dwan Hurt (1963–2016), American basketball player and coach
- Edward P. Hurt (1900–1989), American football player and coach
- Erik F. Hurt (1890–1952), English philatelist
- Francis Hurt (1803–1861), English politician
- George Hurt, American politician
- Hallam Hurt, American neonatologist
- Harry Hurt (1927–2009), American motorcycle safety researcher
- Harry Hurt III (born 1951), American journalist and author
- Jakob Hurt (1839–1907), Estonian folklorist, theologian, and linguist
- James Hurt (born 1967), American pianist
- Joel Hurt (1850–1926), American businessman and developer
- John Hurt (1940–2017), English actor
- Louis Bosworth Hurt (1856–1929), English painter
- Marlin Hurt (1905–1946), American actor and musician
- Martin Hurt (born 1984), Estonian footballer
- Mary Beth Hurt (1946–2026), American actress
- Maurice Hurt (born 1987), American footballer
- Mississippi John Hurt (John Smith Hurt; 1892–1966), American musician
- Norbert Hurt (born 1985), Estonian football player and manager
- Pete Hurt (born 1956), American football player and coach
- Richard Hurt (died 1616), English politician
- Robert L. Hurt, American physicist
- Robert Hurt (born 1969), American politician
- Tony Hurt (born 1946), New Zealand rower
- Wade Hurt (soil scientist), American soil scientist
- William Hurt (1950–2022), American actor

== Fictional characters ==
- Simon Hurt (Doctor Hurt), character from the DC Comics universe

== See also ==
- Hurter, Swiss noble family
