= Wet meadow =

Type of wetland

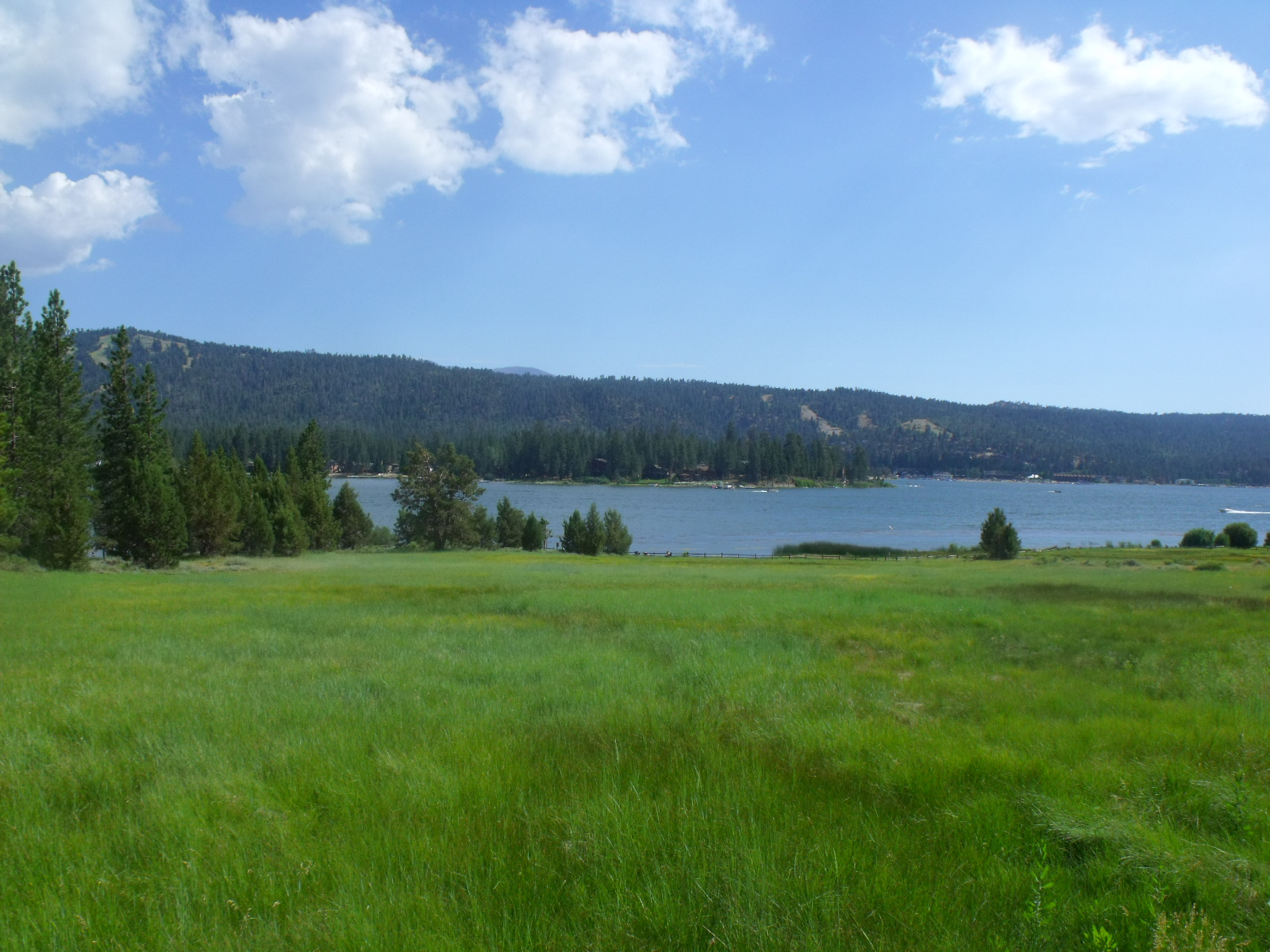
A wet meadow in the San Bernardino Mountains, California, United States.

A wet meadow is a type of wetland with soils that are saturated for part or all of the growing season which prevents the growth of trees and brush. Debate exists whether a wet meadow is a type of marsh or a completely separate type of wetland. Wet prairies and wet savannas are hydrologically similar.

== Hydrology and ecology ==
Wet meadows may occur because of restricted drainage or the receipt of large amounts of water from rain or melted snow. They may also occur in riparian zones and around the shores of large lakes. Unlike a marsh or swamp, a wet meadow does not have standing water present except for brief to moderate periods during the growing season. Instead, the ground in a wet meadow fluctuates between brief periods of inundation and longer periods of saturation. Wet meadows often have large numbers of wetland plant species, which frequently survive as buried seeds during dry periods, and then regenerate after flooding. Wet meadows therefore do not usually support aquatic life such as fish. They typically have a high diversity of plant species, and may attract large numbers of birds, small mammals and insects including butterflies. Vegetation in a wet meadow usually includes a wide variety of herbaceous species including sedges, rushes, grasses and a wide diversity of other plant species. A few of many possible examples include species of Rhexia, Parnassia, Lobelia, many species of wild orchids (e.g. Calopogon and Spiranthes), and carnivorous plants such as Sarracenia and Drosera. Woody plants, if present, account for a minority of the total area cover. High water levels are one of the important factors that prevent invasion by woody plants; in other cases, fire is important. In areas with low frequencies of fire, or reduced water level fluctuations, or higher fertility, plant diversity will decline.

== Conservation ==
Wet meadows were once common in wetland types around the world. They remain an important community type in wet savannas and flatwoods. They also survive along rivers and lakeshores where water levels are allowed to change within and among years. But their area has been dramatically reduced. In some areas, wet meadows are partially drained and farmed and therefore lack the biodiversity described here. In other cases, the construction of dams has interfered with the natural fluctuation of water levels that generates wet meadows.

The most important factors in creating and maintaining wet meadows are natural water level fluctuations and recurring fire. In some cases, small areas of wet meadow are artificially created. Due to the concern with damage that excessive stormwater runoff can cause to nearby lakes and streams, artificial wetlands can be created to capture stormwater. Often this produces marshes, but wet meadows may sometimes be produced. The idea is to capture and store rainwater onsite and use it as a resource to grow attractive native plants that thrive in such conditions. The Buhr Park Children's Wet Meadow is one such project. It is a group of wet meadow ecosystems in Ann Arbor, Michigan designed as an educational opportunity for school-age children. In Europe, wet meadows are sometimes managed by hay-cutting and grazing. Intensified agricultural practices (too frequent mowing, use of mineral fertilizers, manure and insecticides), may lead to declines in the abundance of organisms and species diversity.

== See also ==
- Coastal plain
- Coastal prairie
- Flooded grasslands and savannas
- Flood-meadow
- Water-meadow
- Bog
