= Lectionary 312 =

Lectionary ℓ 312
- New Testament manuscript
- Text: Evangelistarium †
- Date: 9th-century
- Script: Greek
- Found: 1876
- Now at: Saint Catherine's Monastery
- Size: ? cm by ? cm
- Type: Byzantine text-type

Lectionary 312 (Gregory-Aland), designated by siglum ℓ 312 (in the Gregory-Aland numbering) is a Greek manuscript of the New Testament, on parchment. Palaeographically it has been assigned to the 9th century. The manuscript has survived in a fragmentary condition.

== Description ==
The original codex contained lessons from the Gospels (Evangelistarium), on 2 fragment parchment leaves, with some lacunae. It contains the text of Matthew 20:8-15; Luke 1:14-20.

The text is written in Greek uncial letters.

== History ==
Gregory dated the manuscript to the 9th century. It is presently assigned by the INTF to the 9th century.

The manuscript was added to the list of New Testament manuscripts by Caspar René Gregory (number 312^{e}). Constantin von Tischendorf saw it in 1844.

Currently the codex is housed at the Saint Catherine's Monastery in the Sinai.

The fragment is not cited in critical editions of the Greek New Testament (UBS4, NA27).

== See also ==
- List of New Testament lectionaries
- Biblical manuscript
- Textual criticism
- Lectionary 311

== Bibliography ==
- Gregory, Caspar René (1900). Textkritik des Neuen Testaments. Vol. 1. Leipzig: J.C. Hinrichs’sche Buchhandlung. p. 414.
