= Ian Cole =

American ice hockey player (born 1989)

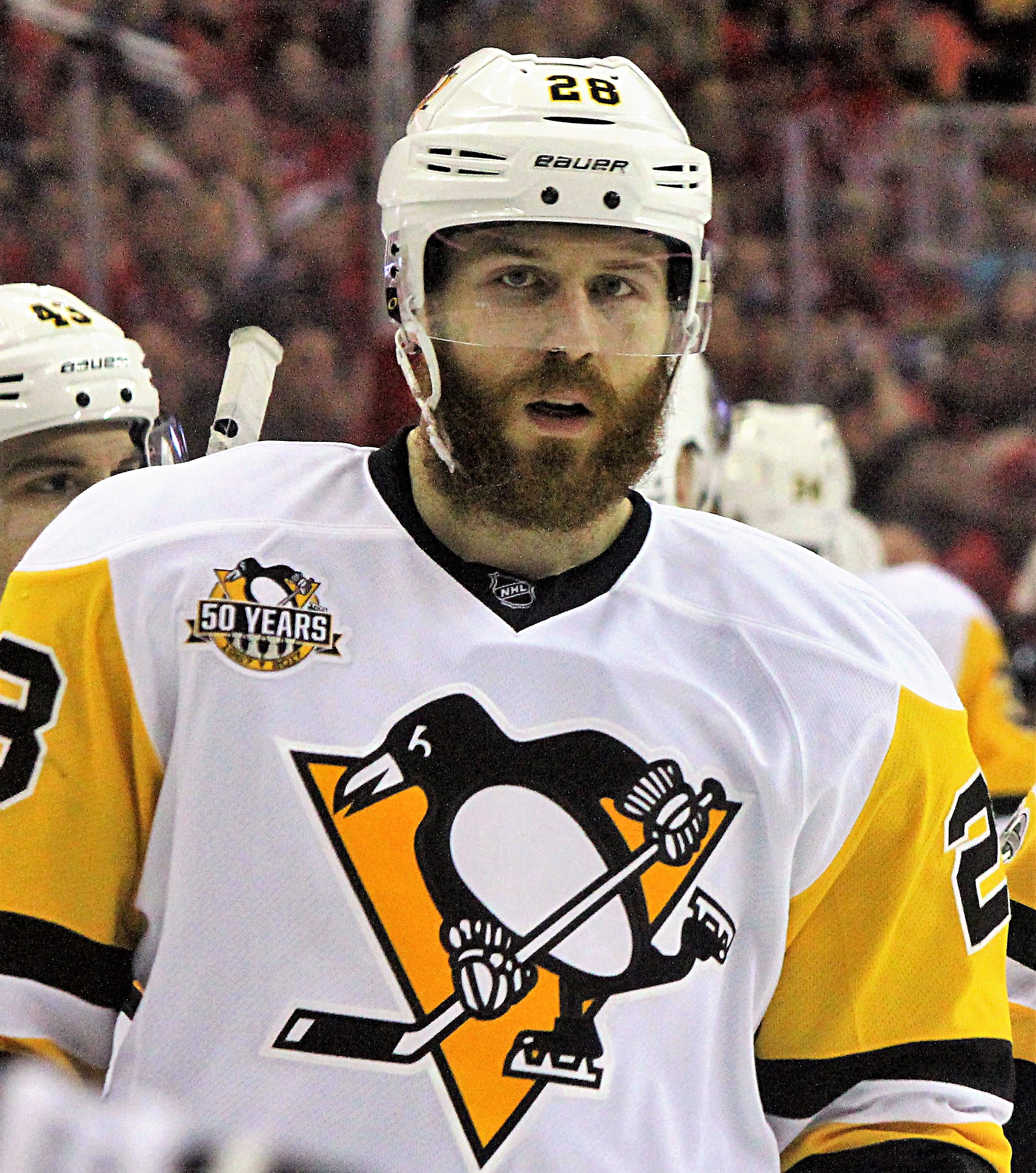
- Cole with the Pittsburgh Penguins during the 2017 Stanley Cup playoffs
- Born: February 21, 1989 (age 37) Ann Arbor, Michigan, U.S.
- Height: 6 ft 1 in (185 cm)
- Weight: 237 lb (108 kg; 16 st 13 lb)
- Position: Defense
- Shoots: Left
- NHL team Former teams: Chicago Blackhawks; St. Louis Blues; Pittsburgh Penguins; Columbus Blue Jackets; Colorado Avalanche; Minnesota Wild; Carolina Hurricanes; Tampa Bay Lightning; Vancouver Canucks; Utah Mammoth
- NHL draft: 18th overall, 2007; St. Louis Blues
- Playing career: 2010–present

Ian Douglas Cole (born February 21, 1989) is an American professional ice hockey player who is a defenseman for the Chicago Blackhawks of the National Hockey League (NHL). Cole won the Stanley Cup with the Pittsburgh Penguins in 2016 and 2017.

== Playing career ==
=== College ===
Cole joined the University of Notre Dame Fighting Irish in 2007 after playing for the U.S. National Team Development Program from 2005 to 2007. Cole played at Notre Dame from the 2007–08 season through the 2009–10 season, Cole finished his collegiate career with 69 points in 111 games at Notre Dame. During Cole's stint at Notre Dame the program qualified for the NCAA Tournament in 2007, 2008, and 2009, including the school's first Frozen Four appearance in 2008.

=== Professional ===
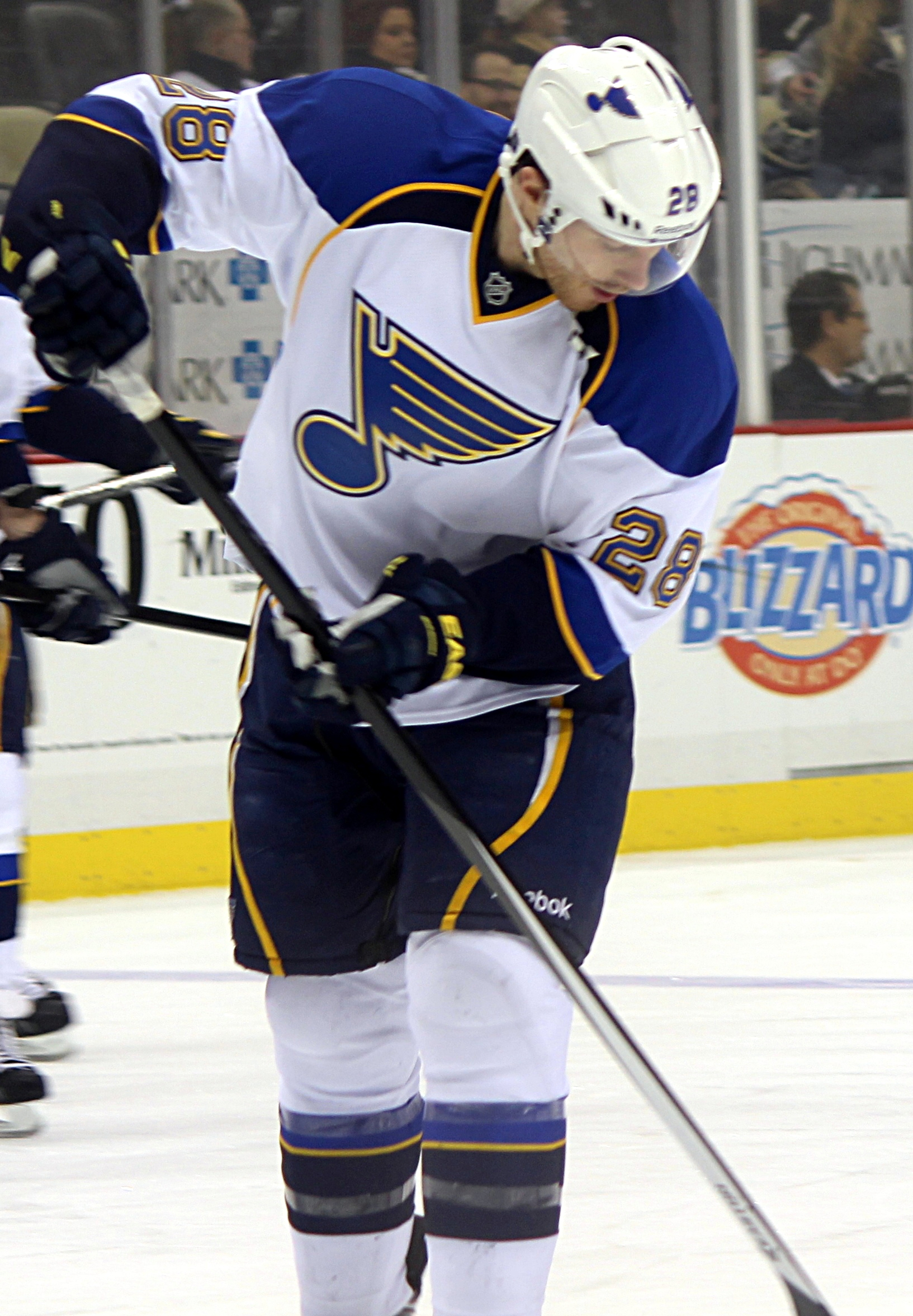
Cole during his tenure with the Blues.

==== St. Louis Blues ====
Cole was drafted 18th overall by the St. Louis Blues in the 2007 NHL entry draft. At the conclusion of the 2009–10 season, Cole turned pro and signed with the St. Louis Blues and was assigned to the Peoria Rivermen of the American Hockey League, the Blues' top minor league affiliate. Cole made his NHL debut on November 6, 2010, after being recalled from Peoria on November 4. He scored his first NHL goal on March 9, 2011, against Columbus Blue Jackets goaltender, Mathieu Garon.

==== Pittsburgh Penguins ====
On March 2, 2015, the Pittsburgh Penguins acquired Ian Cole from the Blues in exchange for Robert Bortuzzo and a 2016 7th-round draft pick.

On June 29, 2015, Cole signed a three-year contract worth $6.3 million to remain in Pittsburgh. In the 2015–16 season, Cole registered 12 assists in 70 games. In the post-season on June 6, 2016, Cole scored his first career playoff goal against Martin Jones of the San Jose Sharks in game four of the Stanley Cup Final.

In the 2016–17 season, Cole reached a career high of 26 points with the Penguins, including five goals and 21 assists in 81 regular season games. He appeared in a post-season high 25 games, registering 9 assists in helping Pittsburgh defend the Stanley Cup.

Entering the final season of his contract with the Penguins in 2017–18, on October 7, 2017, Cole blocked a shot from Nashville Predators defenseman Roman Josi and missed the next three games to recover. Cole appeared in 47 games with the Penguins, posting 13 points, before on February 23, 2018, Cole was traded to the Ottawa Senators along with a 2018 first-round pick, a 2019 third-round draft pick, and Filip Gustavsson in exchange for a 2018 third-round draft pick, prospect Vincent Dunn, and Derick Brassard.

==== Columbus Blue Jackets ====
On February 26, 2018, before appearing with the Senators, Cole was traded to the Columbus Blue Jackets in exchange for Nick Moutrey and a 2020 third-round pick. Cole's addition to Columbus' blueline, led to a charge up the standings and secured a playoff berth. In 20 regular season games, he contributed with 2 goals and 7 points before registering 3 assists in 6 post-season games in a first-round defeat to eventual champions, the Washington Capitals.

==== Colorado Avalanche ====
As a free agent in the off-season, Cole signed a three-year, $12.75 million contract with the Colorado Avalanche on July 1, 2018.

On February 8, during a 2018–19 regular season game against the Washington Capitals, Cole laid a late hit on Evgeny Kuznetsov resulting in a fight with Tom Wilson. It was determined that Tom Wilson had fractured Cole's orbital bone and he was subsequently placed on Colorado's injured reserve.

Entering his final year under contract with the Avalanche in the pandemic delayed 2020–21 season, Cole played in a third pairing role in the opening two games.

==== Minnesota Wild ====
On January 19, 2021, Cole was traded by the Avalanche to divisional rival club, the Minnesota Wild, in exchange for Greg Pateryn. Cole made an instant impact, solidifying the Wild's third pairing and helping the team push up the standings in recording 1 goal and 8 points through 52 regular season games. In a first-round series defeat to the Vegas Golden Knights, Cole featured in all seven games.

==== Carolina Hurricanes ====
As a free agent, despite showing interest to return to the Wild, Cole was unable to come to terms and was signed to a one-year, $2.9 million contract with the Carolina Hurricanes on July 28, 2021. He scored the overtime game-winning goal against the New York Rangers in game one of their second-round series in the 2022 Stanley Cup playoffs.

==== Tampa Bay Lightning ====
Having concluded his contract with the Hurricanes, Cole was again on the move in agreeing to a one-year, $3 million contract with the Tampa Bay Lightning on July 13, 2022.

The Lightning announced the team had suspended Cole, with pay, on October 10, 2022, pending an investigation into allegations of sexual abuse. "I take the allegations made against me today in an anonymous tweet very seriously," Cole said in a statement made through his agent. "I look forward to clearing my name and demonstrating to the NHL and the Tampa Bay Lightning that these allegations are unfounded." Ultimately, both the team and league investigations into Cole found no evidence that the allegations were truthful.

==== Vancouver Canucks ====
After a lone season with the Lightning, Cole left as a free agent and was signed to a one-year, $3 million contract with the Vancouver Canucks for the 2023–24 season on July 1, 2023.

==== Utah Hockey Club/Mammoth ====
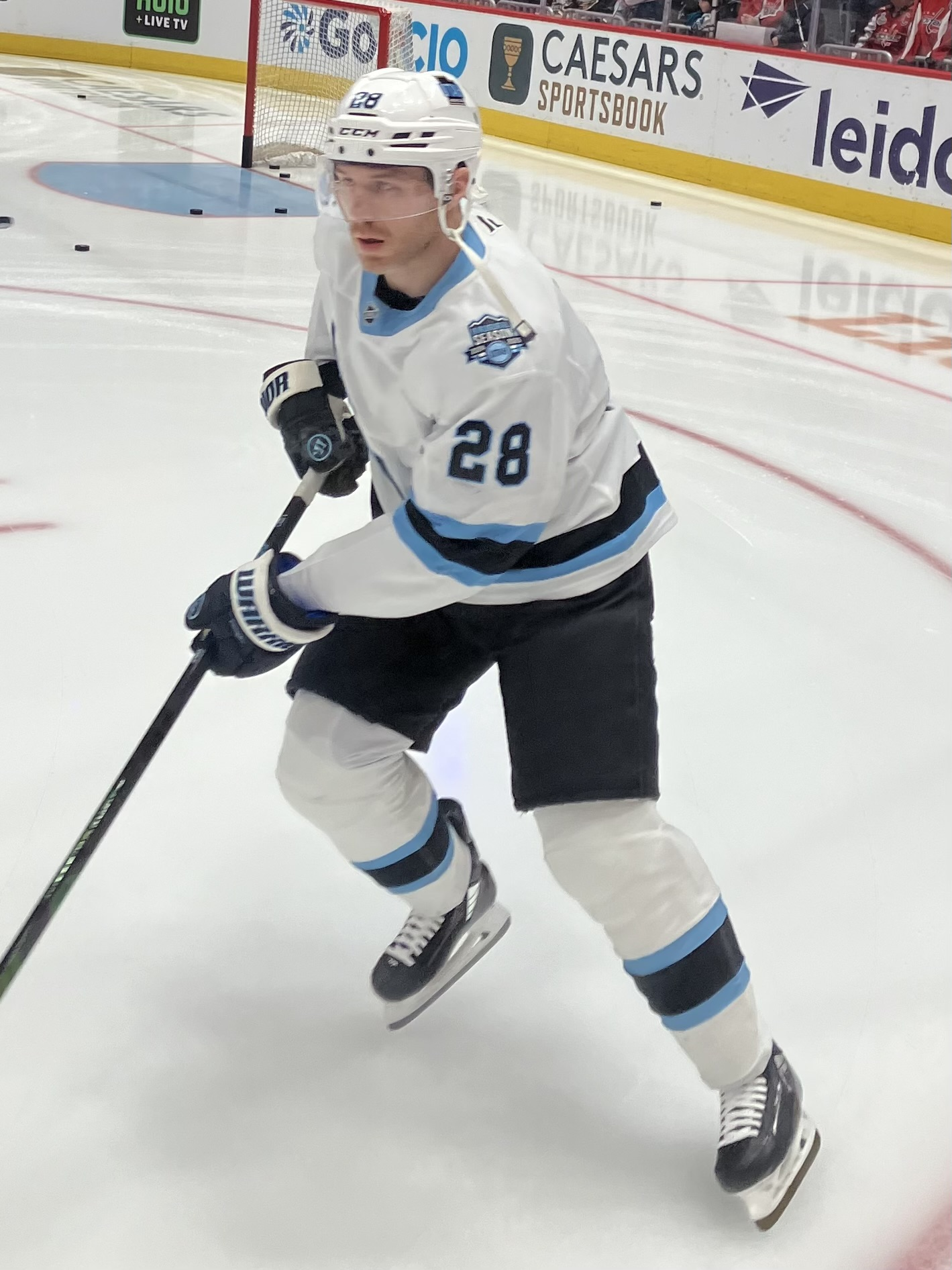
Cole with the Utah Hockey Club in 2025.

After spending just one year with the Canucks, Cole once again became an unrestricted free agent, signing a one-year, $3.1 million contract with the Utah Hockey Club on July 1, 2024.

==== Chicago Blackhawks ====
After two seasons with the Mammoth, Cole left as a free agent, signing a one-year, $4 million contract with the Chicago Blackhawks on July 1, 2026. On October 23, Cole played his 1,000th NHL game, becoming the 426th player to reach the mark.

== International play ==
Medal record

Men's ice hockey

Representing the United States

World Junior Championships
Bronze medal – third place	2007 Sweden	

Cole's first international experience came at the 2007 World Junior Championships. Cole added four goals and an assist in seven games of the tournament, helping United States national junior team to a bronze medal finish. The 2007 tournament marked the most points Cole would score at the event, in 2008 he was held pointless and in his final appearance in the tournament in 2009 he finished with two goals and two assists.

== Personal life ==
Cole was born and raised in Ann Arbor, Michigan with his younger sister, mother Connie, and father Doug. He learned to skate at Yost Ice Arena. He also skated outdoors at Buhr Park and did power skating at Veterans Memorial Ice Arena. Growing up, he played for the Ann Arbor Amateur Hockey Association at the Ice Cube.

== Career statistics ==
=== Regular season and playoffs ===
			Regular season					Playoffs
Season	Team	League	GP	G	A	Pts	PIM	GP	G	A	Pts	PIM
2005–06	U.S. NTDP U17	USDP	18	2	1	3	14	—	—	—	—	—
2005–06	U.S. NTDP U18	USDP	1	0	0	0	0	—	—	—	—	—
2005–06	U.S. NTDP U18	NAHL	40	2	8	10	75	12	0	3	3	14
2006–07	U.S. NTDP U18	USDP	42	6	11	17	37	—	—	—	—	—
2006–07	U.S. NTDP U18	NAHL	16	2	7	9	28	—	—	—	—	—
2007–08	University of Notre Dame	CCHA	43	8	12	20	40	—	—	—	—	—
2008–09	University of Notre Dame	CCHA	38	6	20	26	58	—	—	—	—	—
2009–10	University of Notre Dame	CCHA	30	3	19	22	55	—	—	—	—	—
2009–10	Peoria Rivermen	AHL	9	1	4	5	4	—	—	—	—	—
2010–11	Peoria Rivermen	AHL	44	5	10	15	63	—	—	—	—	—
2010–11	St. Louis Blues	NHL	26	1	3	4	35	—	—	—	—	—
2011–12	Peoria Rivermen	AHL	22	1	3	4	26	—	—	—	—	—
2011–12	St. Louis Blues	NHL	26	1	5	6	22	2	0	0	0	0
2012–13	Peoria Rivermen	AHL	34	3	11	14	43	—	—	—	—	—
2012–13	St. Louis Blues	NHL	15	0	1	1	10	—	—	—	—	—
2013–14	St. Louis Blues	NHL	46	3	8	11	31	—	—	—	—	—
2014–15	St. Louis Blues	NHL	54	4	5	9	44	—	—	—	—	—
2014–15	Pittsburgh Penguins	NHL	20	1	7	8	7	5	0	2	2	8
2015–16	Pittsburgh Penguins	NHL	70	0	12	12	59	24	1	2	3	14
2016–17	Pittsburgh Penguins	NHL	81	5	21	26	72	25	0	9	9	22
2017–18	Pittsburgh Penguins	NHL	47	3	10	13	52	—	—	—	—	—
2017–18	Columbus Blue Jackets	NHL	20	2	5	7	24	6	0	3	3	2
2018–19	Colorado Avalanche	NHL	71	2	13	15	115	12	0	5	5	16
2019–20	Colorado Avalanche	NHL	65	4	22	26	36	15	0	2	2	10
2020–21	Colorado Avalanche	NHL	2	0	0	0	0	—	—	—	—	—
2020–21	Minnesota Wild	NHL	52	1	7	8	32	7	0	0	0	6
2021–22	Carolina Hurricanes	NHL	75	2	17	19	83	14	1	1	2	10
2022–23	Tampa Bay Lightning	NHL	78	3	14	17	61	6	1	2	3	4
2023–24	Vancouver Canucks	NHL	78	2	9	11	61	13	0	2	2	6
2024–25	Utah Hockey Club	NHL	82	1	16	17	77	—	—	—	—	—
2025–26	Utah Mammoth	NHL	82	3	20	23	50	6	1	1	2	4
NHL totals			990	38	195	233	871	135	4	29	33	102

=== International ===
Year	Team	Event	Result	GP	G	A	Pts	PIM
2006	United States	U17	2nd place, silver medalist(s)	6	0	1	1	4
2007	United States	U18	2nd place, silver medalist(s)	7	4	1	5	6
2008	United States	WJC	4th	6	0	0	0	6
2009	United States	WJC	5th	6	2	2	4	4
Junior totals				25	6	4	10	20

== Awards and honors ==
Award	Year
College
All-CCHA First Team	2008–09
AHCA West First-Team All-American	2008–09
CCHA All-Tournament Team	2009
NHL
Stanley Cup champion	2016, 2017

Awards and achievements
Preceded by Lars Eller	St. Louis Blues first-round draft pick 2007	Succeeded by David Perron
