= Wade Hurt =

Wade Hurt may refer to:

- Wade Hurt (soil scientist)
- Wade Hurt (politician)
