= Hort =

Hort may refer to:

- Hort, Hungary, a settlement in Heves county
- Hort., an abbreviation which indicates that a name for a plant saw significant use in the horticultural literature but was never properly published
- Hort (surname)

== See also ==
- Hart (disambiguation)
- Hurt (disambiguation)
