= Lectionary 308 =

Lectionary ℓ 308
- New Testament manuscript
- Text: Evangelistarium †
- Date: 11th century
- Script: Greek
- Found: 1876
- Now at: Cambridge University Library
- Size: 29 cm by 21 cm
- Type: Byzantine text-type

Lectionary 308 (Gregory-Aland), designated by siglum ℓ 308 (in the Gregory-Aland numbering) is a Greek manuscript of the New Testament, on parchment. Palaeographically it has been assigned to the 11th century. The manuscript is lacunose.

== Description ==
The original codex contained lessons from the Gospels (Evangelistarium), from John, Matthew, and Luke, on 112 parchment leaves, with some lacunae. The leaves are measured (29 cm by 21 cm). It has musical notes. Many leaves at the end and some leaves inside were lost

The text is written in Greek minuscule letters, in two columns per page, 30-33 lines per page.

The codex contains the weekday Gospel Lessons (Evangelistarium). It contains Menologion.

== History ==
Gregory and Scrivener dated the manuscript to the 11th or 12th century. It has been assigned by the Institute for New Testament Textual Research (INTF) to the 12th century.

It was bought from Quaritch for the university in 1876.

The manuscript was added to the list of New Testament manuscripts by Scrivener (294^{e}) and Caspar René Gregory (number 308^{e}). It was examined by Hort. Gregory saw it in 1883.

The codex is housed at the Cambridge University Library (MS Add.1840) in Cambridge.

== See also ==
- List of New Testament lectionaries
- Biblical manuscript
- Textual criticism
- Lectionary 307

== Bibliography ==
- Gregory, Caspar René (1900). Textkritik des Neuen Testaments. Vol. 1. Leipzig: J.C. Hinrichs’sche Buchhandlung. p. 414.
