= Lectionary 309 =

Lectionary ℓ 309
- New Testament manuscript
- Text: Evangelistarium †
- Date: 10th century
- Script: Greek
- Found: 1876
- Now at: Cambridge University Library
- Size: 27.5 cm by 20 cm
- Type: Byzantine text-type

Lectionary 309 (Gregory-Aland), designated by siglum ℓ 309 (in the Gregory-Aland numbering) is a Greek manuscript of the New Testament, on parchment. Palaeographically it has been assigned to the 10th century. The manuscript is lacunose.

== Description ==
The original codex contained lessons from the Gospels (Evangelistarium), on 8 parchment leaves, with some lacunae. The leaves are measured (27.5 cm by 20 cm). It has musical notes. Many leaves at the end and some leaves inside were lost

The text is written in Greek minuscule letters, in two columns per page, 22 lines per page.

The codex contains lessons, which were red from the eleventh Sunday (Luke 14:20) to Sunday of the Publican (Luke 18:14).

== History ==
Gregory and Scrivener dated the manuscript to the 10th century. It is presently assigned by the INTF to the 10th century.

It belonged to the Tischendorf's collection. It was bought from Tischendorf's family for the university in 1876.

The manuscript was added to the list of New Testament manuscripts by Scrivener (295^{e}) and Caspar René Gregory (number 309^{e}). It was examined by Hort. Gregory saw it in 1883.

Currently the codex is housed at the Cambridge University Library (MS Add.1879.2) in Cambridge.

== See also ==
- List of New Testament lectionaries
- Biblical manuscript
- Textual criticism
- Lectionary 308

== Bibliography ==
- Gregory, Caspar René (1900). Textkritik des Neuen Testaments. Vol. 1. Leipzig: J.C. Hinrichs’sche Buchhandlung. p. 414.
