= Historia Plantarum (Theophrastus) =

Botany book by Theophrastus

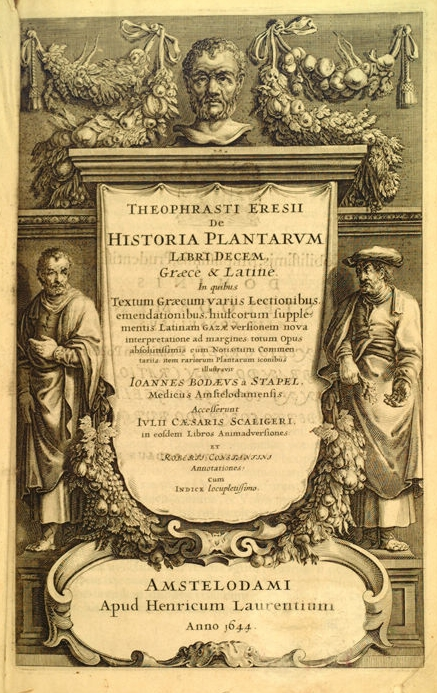
- The frontispiece to an illustrated 1644 edition, Amsterdam
- Author: Theophrastus
- Subject: Botany
- Publication date: c. 350 BC – c. 287 BC
- Publication place: Ancient Greece
- Pages: 10 books, 9 surviving

Theophrastus's Enquiry into Plants or Historia Plantarum (Ancient Greek: Περὶ φυτῶν ἱστορία, Peri phyton historia) was, along with his mentor Aristotle's History of Animals, Pliny the Elder's Natural History and Dioscorides's De materia medica, one of the most important books of natural history written in ancient times, and like them it was influential in the Renaissance. Theophrastus looks at plant structure, reproduction and growth; the varieties of plant around the world; wood; wild and cultivated plants; and their uses. Book 9 in particular, on the medicinal uses of plants, is one of the first herbals, describing juices, gums and resins extracted from plants, and how to gather them.

Historia Plantarum was written some time between c. 350 BC and c. 287 BC in ten volumes, of which nine survive. In the book, Theophrastus described plants by their uses, and attempted a biological classification based on how plants reproduced, a first in the history of botany. He continually revised the manuscript, and it remained in an unfinished state on his death. The condensed style of the text, with its many lists of examples, indicate that Theophrastus used the manuscript as the working notes for lectures to his students, rather than intending it to be read as a book.

Historia Plantarum was first translated into Latin by Theodorus Gaza; the translation was published in 1483. Johannes Bodaeus published a frequently cited folio edition in Amsterdam in 1644, complete with commentaries and woodcut illustrations. The first English translation was made by Sir Arthur Hort and published in 1916.

== Book ==
The Enquiry into Plants is in Hort's parallel text a book of some 400 pages of original Greek, consisting of about 100,000 words. It was originally organised into ten books, of which nine survive, though it is possible the surviving text represents all the material, rearranged into nine books rather than the original ten. Along with his other surviving botanical work, On the Causes of Plants, Enquiry into Plants was an important influence on science in the middle ages. On the strength of these books, the first scientific inquiries into plants and one of the first systems of plant classification, Linnaeus called Theophrastus "the father of botany".

Theophrastus's two plant books have similar titles to two books on animals by his mentor Aristotle; Roger French concludes that he was effectively "doing a peripatetic exercise" in identifying regularities in and differences between plants, in the manner of Aristotle with animals. However, he went beyond Aristotle in describing seeds as parts of the plant; Aristotle, French argues, would never have described semen or embryos as parts of an animal.

Theophrastus made use of a variety of sources for the book, including Diocles on drugs and medicinal plants. Theophrastus claims to have gathered information from drug-sellers (pharmacopolai) and root-cutters (rhizotomoi). Plants described include poppy (mēkōn), hemlock (kōnion), wild lettuce (thridakinē), and mandrake (mandragoras).

The surviving texts are the notes that Theophrastus used in teaching, and they were continually revised. He referred to earlier books in the Lyceum library including Democritus, sometimes preserving fragments of books otherwise lost. He mentions about 500 species of plant.

== Translations ==
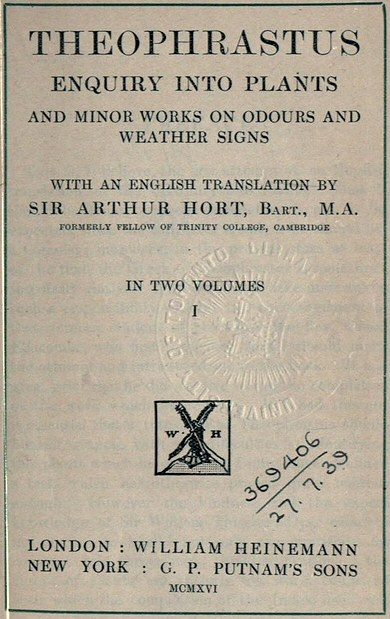
Title page of Sir Arthur Hort's edition with parallel Greek and English text, 1916

The Enquiry into Plants (along with the Causes of Plants) was first translated into Latin by Theodore Gaza by 1454, circulated in manuscript, and then published at Treviso in 1483. (Note: Theodore Gaza, a refugee from Thessalonika, was working from a lost Greek manuscript that was different from any others. (Hort)) In its original Greek it first appeared from the press of Aldus Manutius at Venice, 1495–98, from a single corrupt manuscript which has since been lost. (Note: It was carefully copied in a printing at Basel, 1541.) Wimmer identified two manuscripts of first quality, the Codex Urbinas in the Vatican Library, which was not made known to Johann Gottlob Schneider, who with H. F. Link made the first modern critical edition, Leipzig 1818–1821, and the excerpts in the Codex Parisiensis in the Bibliothèque nationale de France.

A good and often-cited edition is that of Johannes Bodaeus, published in Amsterdam in 1644. This folio edition has the Greek and Latin texts printed in parallel, along with commentaries on the text by Julius Caesar Scaliger and Robert Constantine, and woodcut illustrations of plants. Sir William Thiselton-Dyer described the commentary as "botanically monumental and fundamental".

The first translation into English, with an introduction and parallel Greek and English texts, was made by Sir Arthur Hort (1864–1935). It was published simultaneously by William Heinemann in London and G. P. Putnam's Sons in New York, as a two-volume book Theophrastus Enquiry into Plants and minor works on odours and weather signs in 1916.

Three older German editions with commentaries are described by Hort as indispensable: Schneider and Link's 1818–1821 edition already mentioned; Kurt Polycarp Joachim Sprengel's 1822 edition from Halle; and Christian Friedrich Heinrich Wimmer's 1842 edition from Breslau.

== Contents ==
Enquiry into Plants classifies plants according to how they reproduce, their localities, their sizes, and their practical uses including as foods, juices, and herbs.

The books describe the natural history of plants as follows:

=== Book 1: Plant anatomy ===
Theophrastus tours plant anatomy, including leaves (phylla), flowers, catkins, fruits (karpoi), seeds, roots (rhizai), and wood.

Plants are classified as trees, shrubs, herbaceous perennials, and annual herbs (poai); these divisions are acknowledged to be rough and ready, as is the division into wild or cultivated, whereas the aquatic/terrestrial division appeared to be natural. Theophrastus notes that some plants are irregular, while the silver fir has branches always opposite each other and other plants have branches equally spaced or in rows. Figs have the longest roots, while the banyan sends roots down from the shoots, forming a circle of roots at a distance all round the trunk.

=== Book 2: Tree and plant propagation ===
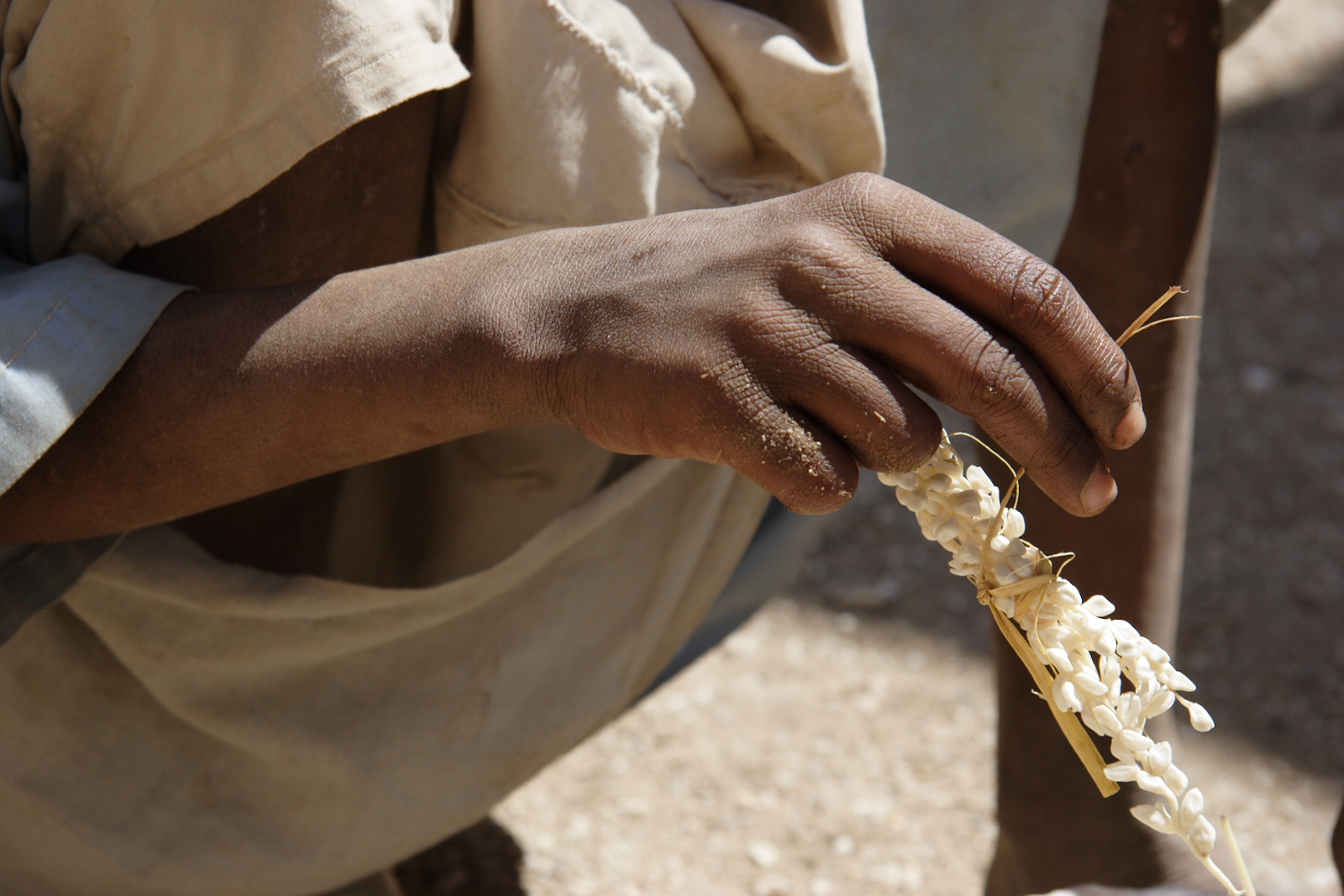
Boy in Sudan with date palm spathe for artificial pollination, as described by Theophrastus

Theophrastus writes that plants can grow spontaneously, from seed, or from vegetative parts of the plant. Plants with bulbs grow from those. Soil and climate influence growth. Some plants change into others unless care is taken, so bergamot turns into mint, and wheat turns into darnel. He reports that if celery is trodden after sowing, it will become curly, and that figs are the easiest trees to propagate, whereas date palms have to be grown from several seeds together, and they like irrigation, dung, salt (at the age of one year) and being transplanted. Other kinds of palm have different habits and fruits. He notes that gall insects come out of wild figs and make the cultivated figs swell, which helps to prevent premature shedding of the fruit. The male spathe of the date palm is cut off and brought to the female, and its dust is shaken over the female tree to make it fruit.

=== Book 3: Wild trees ===
Theophrastus asserts that all wild trees grow from seed or from roots. He mentions that the philosophers spoke of spontaneous generation, as when Anaxagoras claims the air contains the seeds of every plant, whereas Diogenes believed plants arose when water mixed with earth. In places like Crete, Theophrastus writes that native plants spring up if the ground is simply disturbed, and that wild trees are generally more vigorous than cultivated ones, give fruit later, and like cold and hilly terrain. He asserts that trees which can grow both on hill and plain grow better and taller when grown on the plain.

The book offers numerous examples of Theophrastus's note-like style, with lists of species interspersed among the general explanations. For example, "Now among wild trees those are evergreen which were mentioned before, silver-fir fir 'wild pine' box andrachne yew Phoenician cedar terebinth alaternus hybrid arbutus bay holm-oak holly cotoneaster kermes-oak tamarisk; but all the others shed their leaves ..."

=== Book 4: Trees and shrubs from abroad ===
Theophrastus describes trees and shrubs from different places and habitats, as for instance a sheltered part of the Arcadia region near Krane in a deep valley where the sun never reaches, and the silver-fir trees are exceptionally tall. He looks into the plants of Egypt, Libya, Asia, northern regions, and then aquatic plants from the Mediterranean, wetlands especially in Egypt, reeds and rushes. He also considers factors that limit the life of plants including diseases and weather damage.

=== Book 5: Wood ===
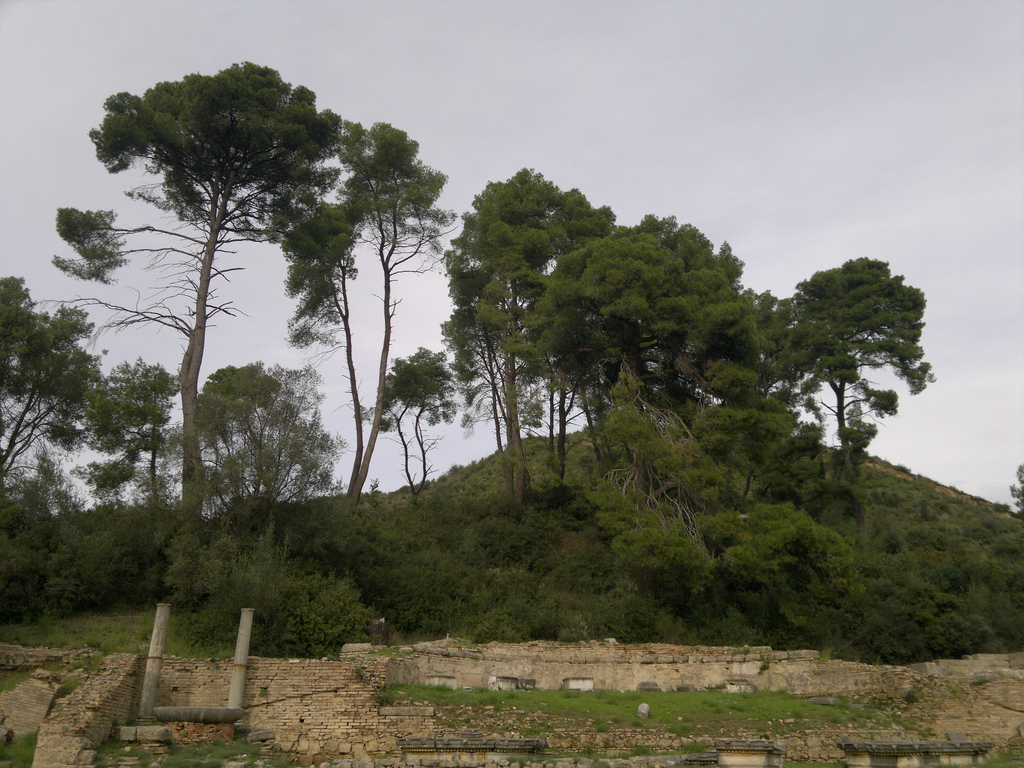
Aleppo pines, like these at ancient Olympia, yielded wood suitable for shipbuilding, according to Theophrastus in Book 5.

Theophrastus describes the wood of different trees, the effects of climate on wood, of knots and 'coiling' in timber and other differences in quality. He discusses which woods to use for specific purposes such as for carpentry, shipbuilding and for building houses, and the making of charcoal. The most useful trees are said to be silver-fir and fir, and they have the best wood in the largest sizes; the silver-fir is softer than the fir, and its wood has layers like an onion, and is made entirely of these layers. The strongest and most attractive wood is smooth, without knots. In Syria, terebinth wood is dark and close-grained, Theophrastus reports, and used both for the handles of daggers and, turned on the lathe, for making cups. He claims that the hardest timber is of oak and holm oak, while elm warps the least, so it is used for the pivots and sockets of doors, which must be straight. The wood of palms is light and soft like cork-oak, but is tougher and less brittle, so it is good for carving images. Timber from the cedar, ebony, box, olive, oak and sweet chestnut keeps well and resists decay. He asserts that Tamarisk wood from Greece is weak, but from the Arabian island of Tylos it is as strong as kermes-oak. The wood of oak and the knotted parts of fir and silver-fir are described as the hardest to work. Ships are generally made of silver-fir, fir, and Syrian cedar; in Cyprus they use Aleppo pine which is better than the fir that grows there. Theophrastus records that in the lowlands of Italy (the country of the Latins) they grow bay, myrtle and excellent beech trees long enough for the whole length of a ship.

=== Book 6: Undershrubs, with thorns or without ===
Theophrastus classifies undershrubs as spiny, such as thistle, eryngo and safflower, and spineless, such as marjoram, savory, sage, horehound, and balm. He notes that some have a hollow stem, such as deadly nightshade and hemlock. Roses, he writes, vary in number of petals, roughness of bark, colour and scent; they have five, twelve, twenty or more petals, and those with the sweetest scent come from Cyrene, and are used for making perfume. The times of flowering of different species are listed.

=== Book 7: Pot-herbs ===
Theophrastus reports that cabbage, radish and turnip are sown in July after the summer solstice, along with beet, lettuce, mustard and coriander. Leeks, celery, onion and orache are sown in January. Cucumber, gourds, basil, purslane and savory, in contrast, he writes, are sown in April. Ripe seeds do not germinate at once but wait for the right time. He asserts that all the herbs can be grown from seed, while rue, marjoram and basil can be raised from cuttings, and garlic, onion and other bulbs are grown from their roots. All the flowers of a herb appear at one time, except for basil which puts out a series of flowers starting low on the plant. Cumin has the most fruits, but it is said you have to curse and insult the plant to get a good crop. Theophrastus describes varieties of some herbs, for instance that the white lettuce is sweetest and tenderest, while there are many kinds of onion, with Sardian, Cnidian, Samothracian and Ascalonian varieties from those regions. Garlic is said to be planted close to the solstice; the Cyprian variety is largest and is used in salads. All herbs except rue are said to like dung. Of the wild herbs, Theophrastus reports that some such as cat's ear are edible, whereas others like dandelion are too bitter to be worth eating.

=== Book 8: Cereals and legumes ===
Theophrastus groups together the cereals and the legumes (peas and beans), and includes millet and other many-seeded plants like sesame also. These can only be grown from seed. They can be sown early, as with wheat, barley and beans, or in spring after the equinox, for plants like lentils, tares and peas. Vetch and chickpeas can, he reports, be sown at either season. When sprouting, beans form a shape like a penis, from which the root grows down and the leafy stem upwards. Wheat and barley flower for four or five days, whereas the legumes flower for much longer. Theophrastus reports that these plants grow differently according to the region, so for instance crops in Salamis appear earlier than those elsewhere in Attica. Wheat varieties are recorded as being named for their localities; they differ in colour, size, growth habit and food value. In a place near Bactra in Asia the wheat grains are said to grow as big as the stone of an olive, whereas pulses do not in Theophrastus's view vary to the same extent.

=== Book 9: Medicinal uses of plants ===
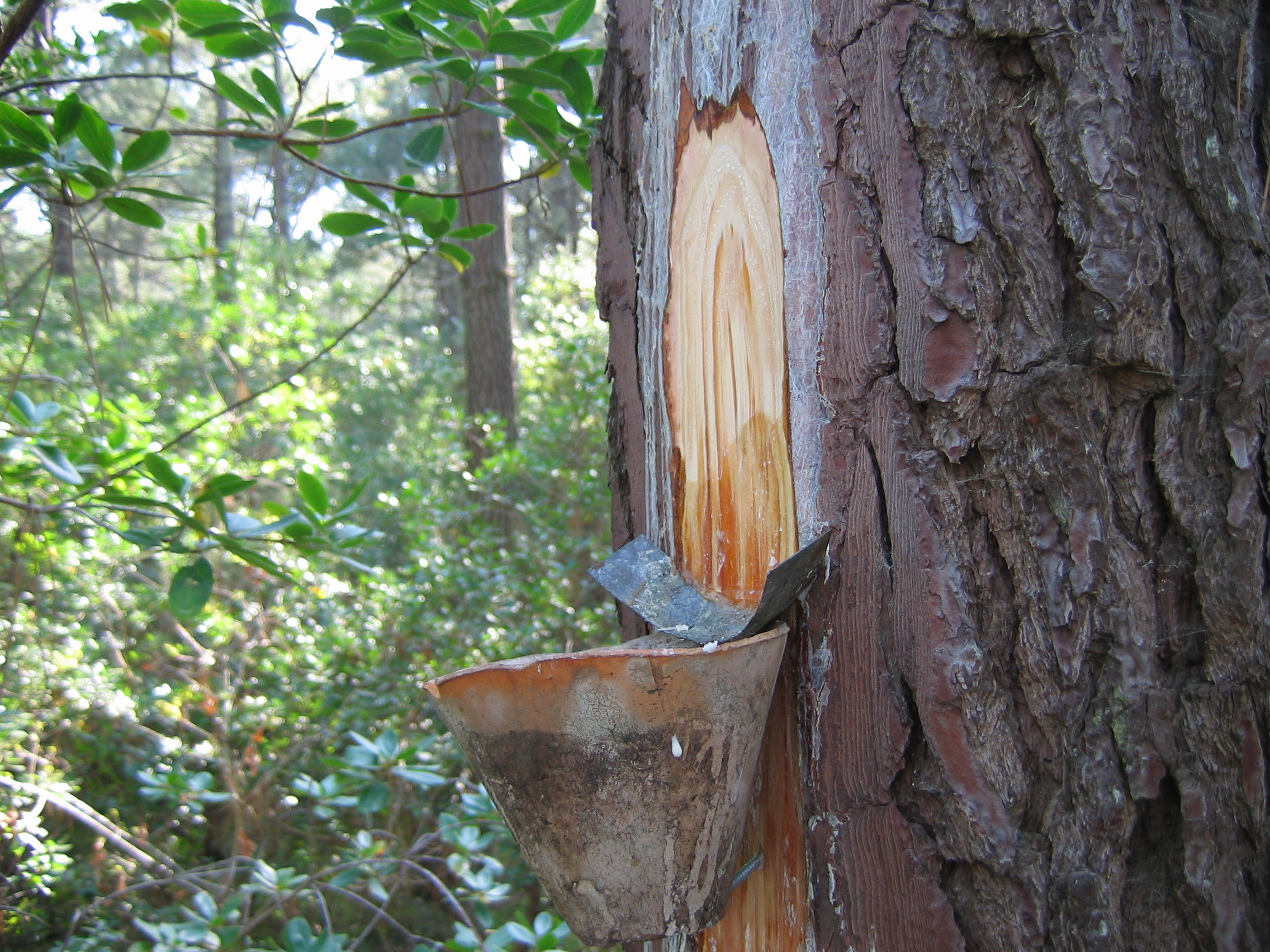
Resin being collected by tapping a pine tree

This book is one of the first herbals, admittedly much simpler than those of Nicander, Dioscorides or Galen. Theophrastus covers juices (chylismos), gums, and resins, the uses of some hundreds of plants as medicines, and how to gather them.

Resin is gathered by tapping trees including silver-fir and Aleppo pine; the best resin is from the terebinth. On Mount Ida in Crete the people gather pitch from Corsican pine and Aleppo pine. Gums such as frankincense, myrrh and balsam of Mecca are gathered either by cutting the plant or naturally. Frankincense and myrrh are gathered into the closely guarded temple of the Sabaeans. Cassia and cinnamon also come from the Arabian peninsula.

Drug collectors have certain traditions which may be accurate or may be exaggerated. Precautions are rightly taken when gathering hellebore, and men cannot dig it up for long; whereas the story that the peony must be dug up at night for fear that a woodpecker will watch and cause the man a rectal prolapse is a mere superstition. Similarly the idea that you must mark three circles around a mandrake plant with a sword, and speak of the mysteries of love while cutting it, is just far-fetched.

Apart from Greece itself, medicinal plants are produced in Italy in Tyrrhenia, as Aeschylus records, and Latium; and in Egypt, which as Homer mentions is the source of the drug nepenthes that makes men forget sorrow and passion. The best hemlock comes from Susa, while dittany, useful in childbirth, comes only from Crete. Wolfsbane comes from Crete and Zakynthos; it can be made into a poison that causes death a year or more after taking it, and there is no antidote. Hemlock is a poison which brings a painless death; pepper and frankincense are antidotes for it. Strykhnos causes madness, but oleander root in wine makes people gentle and cheerful. Birthwort has many uses including for bruises on the head, snakebite, and prolapse of the uterus.

== Reception ==
=== Ancient ===
Pliny the Elder made frequent use of Theophrastus, including his books on plants, in his Natural History; the only authors he cited more often were Democritus and Varro.

John Scarborough comments that "The list of herbals assembled in Historia Plantarum IX became the direct ancestor of all later drug treatises in antiquity, and many traces of Theophrastus's (and Diocles's) original observations survive in the Materia Medica of Dioscorides. The analysis of the various plants and plant derivatives shows that the Greek rhizotomoi and drug-vendors had collected much valuable information on the medical employment of plants, and Theophrastus invented a format for this type of information that would be followed after his own time."

=== Mediaeval and Renaissance ===
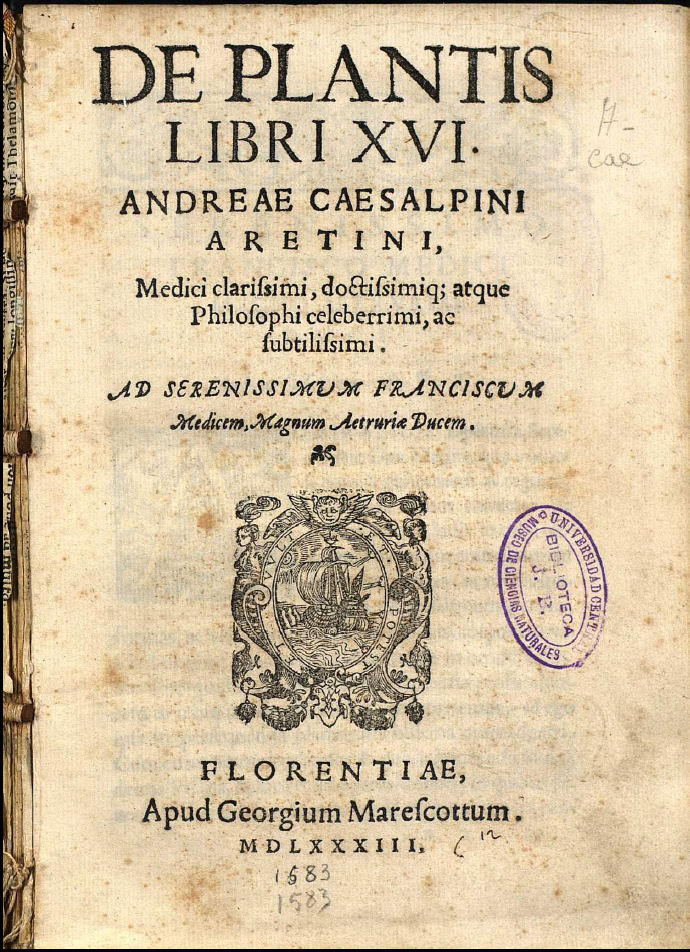
Andrea Cesalpino's 1583 De Plantis made use of Historia Plantarum.

Theophrastus was barely known to western Europe in the Middle Ages; his writings were popularized there only in the 15th century, when Greek manuscripts in the Vatican, possibly, like many other ancient Vatican Greek manuscripts, brought from the Byzantine Empire during its fall to the Ottomans in the 15th century, were translated into Latin by the Byzantine Greek refugee Theodorus Gaza at the request of pope Nicholas V. The effect was to stimulate Renaissance scholars to restart the exploration of plant taxonomy. The science of botany was founded as these scholars engaged with the accounts of plants, and especially of their medicinal uses, together with a newly critical reaction to mediaeval pharmacology, which was based on unthinking acceptance of the Natural History of Pliny the Elder and the De Materia Medica of Dioscorides. By the same token, however, Theophrastus (and Aristotle) fell abruptly out of use around 1550, as classical botany and zoology were effectively assimilated into Renaissance thought in the form of illustrated encyclopedias—which were still heavily based on classical writings. Andrea Cesalpino made use of Theophrastus in his philosophical book on plants, De Plantis (1583). The Italian scholar Julius Caesar Scaliger's accurate and detailed commentaries on the Historia Plantarum were published in Leyden in 1584, after his death.

=== Modern ===
The Chicago Botanic Garden describes Historia Plantarum as the "first great botanical work" of Theophrastus, "the first real botanist"; it states of the 1483 edition printed by Bartolomeo Confalonieri in Treviso that "all taxonomy of plants starts with this modest book", centuries before the modern taxonomy of Linnaeus. Anna Pavord observes in her 2005 book The Naming of Names that Theophrastus made the first ever classification of plants, and that Pliny the Elder, now much better known, used much of his material.

== See also ==
- On Plants

== Bibliography ==
=== Text ===
- Theophrastus (1916). Theophrastus: Enquiry into Plants. Loeb Classical Library. Translated by Hort, Arthur. London and New York: William Heinemann and G.P. Putnam's Sons. (available at Internet Archive as Volume I (Books I–V) and Volume II (Books VI–IX & minor works) )
  - Hort, Arthur. Introduction. In Theophrastus (1916), pp. ix–xxiii.
- Gaza, Theodorus; Scaliger, Iulius Caesar; Bodaeus, Johannes; Corvinus, Johannes Arnoldus; Bodaeus, Egbertus; Constantin, Robert (1644). Theophrasti Eresii De historia plantarum libri decem, Graecè & Latinè. In quibus textum Graecum variis lectionibus, emendationibus, hiulcorum supplementis; Latinam Gazae versionem nova interpretatione ad margines ... item rariorum plantarum iconibus illustravit Ioannes Bodaeus à Stapel ... Accesserunt Iulii Caesaris Scaligeri in eosdem libros animadversiones; et Roberti Constantini annotationes . (in Latin and Greek). Amsterdam: Judoci Broers.

=== Commentary ===
- Einarson, Benedict (January 1976). "The Manuscripts of Theophrastus' Historia Plantarum". Classical Philology. 71 (1): 67–76. doi:10.1086/366234. JSTOR 268519. S2CID 162094717.
- Thomas Fisher Rare Book Library (2014). "Theophrastus and the nature of plants". University of Toronto.
- French, Roger (1994). Ancient Natural History: Histories of Nature. Routledge. pp. 92–99. ISBN 0-415-11545-0.
- Gotthelf, Allan (1988). "Theophrastean Studies: Fifteen Papers on Natural Science, Physics and Metaphysics, Ethics, Religion, and Rhetoric". In Fortenbaugh, William Wall; Sharples, Robert W. (eds.). Historiae I: plantarum et animalium. Transaction Publishers. ISBN 0-88738-171-5.
- Grafton, Anthony; Most, Glenn W.; Settis, Salvatore, eds. (2010). The Classical Tradition. Harvard University Press. ISBN 9780674035720.
- Hall, Matthew (2011). Plants as Persons: A Philosophical Botany. SUNY Press. ISBN 9781438434308.
- Long, George, ed. (1842). "Theophrastus". Penny Cyclopaedia of the Society for the Diffusion of Useful Knowledge. Vol. 24. pp. 332–334.
- Ogilvie, Brian W. (2008). The Science of Describing: Natural History in Renaissance Europe. University of Chicago Press. ISBN 9780226620862.
- Pavord, Anna (2005). The Naming of Names. Bloomsbury. ISBN 978-1-59691-071-3.
- Scarborough, John (1978). "Theophrastus on Herbals and Herbal Remedies". Journal of the History of Biology. 11 (2): 353–385. doi:10.1007/bf00389304. JSTOR 4330714. PMID 11610437. S2CID 44616422.
- Schmitt, Charles B. (1971). "Theophrastus in the Middle Ages". Viator. 2: 257–270.
- Sengbusch, Peter V. (2004). "First Scientific Descriptions". University of Hamburg. Archived from the original on 9 May 2014.
- Valauskas, Edward J. (December 2012). "Theophrastus and the beginnings of modern botany in the Renaissance". Chicago Botanic Garden. Archived from the original on 29 July 2016.
