= A. E. Glasewald =

German bookseller and stamp dealer

Arthur Ernst Glasewald (1861–1926) was a book seller and later stamp dealer in Gössnitz near Leipzig who was a pioneer in the study of German private posts. He founded the Internationale Verein für Localmarkenkunde and was editor and publisher of the journal Neueste Privatpost-Nachrichten. He was joint author and publisher of the Handbuch der deutschen Privatpostmarken.

== Glasewald Medal ==
In 1928, a trust fund was established in memory of Glasewald to award a medal for meritorious research into the history of the German private posts.

Some of the past winners of the medal have been:

- Heinrich Düsterbehn (1950)
- Georg Glasewald (1951)
- Paul Rampacher (1955)
- L.N. & M. Williams (1961)
- Hans Meier zu Eissen (1982)
- Horst Müller (1994)
- Ralph Phillips (2016)

== Selected publications ==
- Handbuch der deutschen Privatpostmarken (published and edited) (in German)
- Die Postwerthzeichen von Griechenland: Nach den neuesten Forschungen (in German). 1896.
