= L. N. and M. Williams =

Leon Norman Williams (left) and Maurice Williams (right)

L.N. and M. Williams were a philatelic writing partnership made up of brothers Leon Norman Williams (known as Norman Williams) (25 March 1914 – 9 April 1999) and Maurice Williams (1905–1976).

== Early life and family ==
Leon Norman Williams was born on 25 March 1914 and Maurice Williams in 1905. Both were married and lived in London.

== Career ==
Norman Williams was a barrister, while his brother Maurice Williams was a full-time journalist and writer.

The brothers' writing collaboration began in 1934. In 1940 they succeeded Fred Melville as editors of the National Philatelic Society's journal The Stamp Lover which they edited until 1964. They also edited The British Philatelist from 1940 to 1954 and Philately from 1951 to 1953. They edited The Cinderella Philatelist, journal of the Cinderella Stamp Club which they also founded, from 1961, which Norman continued after his brother's death.

Their first book collaboration was The Propaganda Forgeries in 1938, a subject they returned to in 1954 with Forged Stamps of Two World Wars.

== Honours ==
They were awarded the Glasewald Medal in 1961 and in 1980 were elected to the Philatelic Writers Hall of Fame of the American Philatelic Society. In 2000, Norman became a member of the APS Hall of Fame.

== Death and legacy ==
Norman Williams died on 9 April 1999 and Maurice Williams in 1976. Their research papers are held in the British Library Philatelic Collections as the Williams Papers.

Maurice Williams's grandson is the comedian Matt Lucas.

== Joint publications ==
=== 1930s ===
- The Propaganda Forgeries (1938)
- Catalogue of the Philatelic Library formed by the late Sir Edward Denny Bacon, K.C.V.O. (1939) – compilers of a sale catalogue
- Philately (1939)

=== 1940s ===
- Famous Stamps (1940)
- A "Melville" Bibliography (1941)
- The W. J. Webster Collection (1941)
- Pioneer Stamp Album (1941)
- More Famous Stamps (1942)
- Priced Catalogue of Local Postage Stamps with Erik F. Hurt (1942); supplement issued in 1948
- Stamp Anniversaries (1943)
- Stamps for All (1943)
- Stamp Collecting for Boys & Girls (1949)
- Stamps of Fame. London: Blandford Press, 1949.

=== 1950s ===
- Stamps Day by Day (1950)
- Postage Stamps (1950, Penguin) - a "Puffin Picture Book"
- Handbook of the Private Local Posts (1950 – essentially a revision of Priced Catalogue of Local Postage Stamps). Vol. VI of Fritz Billig: Billig's Specialized Catalogues
- Collecting Postage Stamps (1950)
- A Century of Stamp Production (1952)
- Basic Philately: The art and craft of stamp making (1952)
- Forged Stamps of Two World Wars (1954)
- Fundamentals of Philately (edited by David Lidman, serialized in The American Philatelist 1954–1963; first published in five separate sections beginning in 1958 then in complete book form 1971. The 1990 edition was revised by Norman alone)
- The Postage Stamp: Its History and Recognition (1956, Penguin); a Japanese translation was published in 1958
- Know Your Stamps (1956) - Expanded edition of Stamps for All
- Stamp Collector's Almanac (1957)

=== 1960s ===
- The Satellite Album (1961)
- Hotel Posts of Hungary & Roumania (1962)
- Scott’s Guidebook to Stamp Collecting (1963)
- Commemorative Postage Stamps of Great Britain (1967)
- Rare Stamps (1967)
- Techniques of Philately (1969)

=== 1970s ===
- Cinderella Stamps. William Heinemann, London, 1970. ISBN 0434866407
- Illustrated Teach Yourself Stamp Collecting (1972)
- Check Your Stamps: How to Make Money from the Post Office (1973)

=== Norman alone also produced ===
- Encyclopedia of Rare and Famous Stamps, (Part I 1993, Part II 1997)
- "Philately 100 Years Ago" in Stamp Collecting (1981)

== References and sources ==
Sources

- "About L. N. and M. Williams" in American Philatelist, vol. 67, No. 7, April 1954, pp. 502–4.
- James Negus, Philatelic Literature, Compilation Techniques and Reference Sources, Limassol, James Bendon, 1991
- Philatelic Literature Review, Vol. 12, Second Quarter, 1963, pp. 9–12
- George van den Berg, in his "Philatelic Notes", Stamps, vol. 39, No. 9, 30 May 1942, p. 303.
