= Lectionary 311 =

Lectionary ℓ 311
- New Testament manuscript
- Text: Evangelistarium †
- Date: 12th century
- Script: Greek-Arabic
- Found: 1876
- Now at: Cambridge University Library
- Size: 14 cm by 21.5 cm
- Type: Byzantine text-type

Lectionary 311 (Gregory-Aland), designated by siglum ℓ 311 (in the Gregory-Aland numbering) is a bilingual Greek–Arabic manuscript of the New Testament, on parchment. Palaeographically it has been assigned to the 12th century. The manuscript has survived in a fragmentary condition.

== Description ==
The original codex contained lessons from the Gospels (Evangelistarium), on four fragment parchment leaves, with some lacunae. The original leaves were measured 14 cm by 21.5 cm (according to the reconstruction). Only the upper part of the four leaves have survived, with the text of the Gospel of Luke 16:24–25, 28–30; 8:16–18, 21, 27, 29–30, 32–34, 38–39.

The text is written in Greek minuscule letters, in two columns per page, 13 lines per page (according to the reconstruction). The left column is written in Greek, the right column is written in Arabic.

The codex contains fragments of lessons, which were read for the fifth and sixth Sundays.

== History ==
Gregory and Scrivener dated the manuscript to the 12th century. It has been assigned by the Institute for New Testament Textual Research to the 12th century.

It once belonged to the Tischendorf's collection. It was bought from Tischendorf's family for the university in 1876.

The manuscript was added to the list of New Testament manuscripts by Frederick Henry Ambrose Scrivener (297^{e}) and Caspar René Gregory (number 311^{e}). It was examined by Fenton John Anthony Hort. Gregory saw it in 1883.

The codex is housed at the Cambridge University Library (MS Add.1879.13) in Cambridge.

The fragment is not cited in critical editions of the Greek New Testament (UBS4, NA28).

== See also ==
- Biblical manuscript
- Lectionary 310
- List of New Testament lectionaries
- Textual criticism

== Bibliography ==
- Gregory, Caspar René (1900). Textkritik des Neuen Testaments. Vol. 1. Leipzig: J.C. Hinrichs’sche Buchhandlung. p. 414.
