= Lectionary 307 =

Lectionary ℓ 307
- New Testament manuscript
- Text: Evangelistarium †
- Date: 12th century
- Script: Greek
- Found: 1876
- Now at: Cambridge University Library
- Size: 25.7 cm by 19.3 cm
- Type: Byzantine text-type

Lectionary 307 (Gregory-Aland), designated by siglum ℓ 307 (in the Gregory-Aland numbering) is a Greek manuscript of the New Testament, on parchment. Palaeographically it has been assigned to the 12th century. The manuscript is lacunose.

== Description ==
The original codex contained lessons from the Gospels (Evangelistarium), on 104 parchment leaves, with some lacunae. The leaves are measured (25.7 cm by 19.3 cm). The first 77 and 10 other leaves were lost. The additional lessons about the season of Epiphany were inserted by other hand. It begins at Luke 8:39 (lesson for sixth Sunday). It has Menologion.

The text is written in Greek minuscule letters, in two columns per page, 16-18 lines per page.

The codex contains the weekday Gospel Lessons (Evangelistarium), which were read from Easter to Pentecost and Saturday/Sunday Gospel lessons for the other weeks.

== History ==
Gregory and Scrivener dated the manuscript to the 12th or 13th century. It has been assigned by the Institute for New Testament Textual Research (INTF) to the 12th century.

It was bought from Quaritch for the university in 1876.

The manuscript was added to the list of New Testament manuscripts by Frederick Henry Ambrose Scrivener (293^{e}) and Caspar René Gregory (number 307^{e}). It was examined by Fenton John Anthony Hort. Gregory saw it in 1883.

The codex is housed at the Cambridge University Library (MS Add.1839) in Cambridge.

== See also ==
- List of New Testament lectionaries
- Biblical manuscript
- Textual criticism
- Lectionary 306

== Bibliography ==
- Gregory, Caspar René (1900). Textkritik des Neuen Testaments. Vol. 1. Leipzig: J.C. Hinrichs’sche Buchhandlung. p. 413.
