= Fritz Billig =

Austrian stamp dealer

Fritz F. Billig
- Born: 1902
- Died: 1986 (aged 83–84)
- Occupation: Philatelist

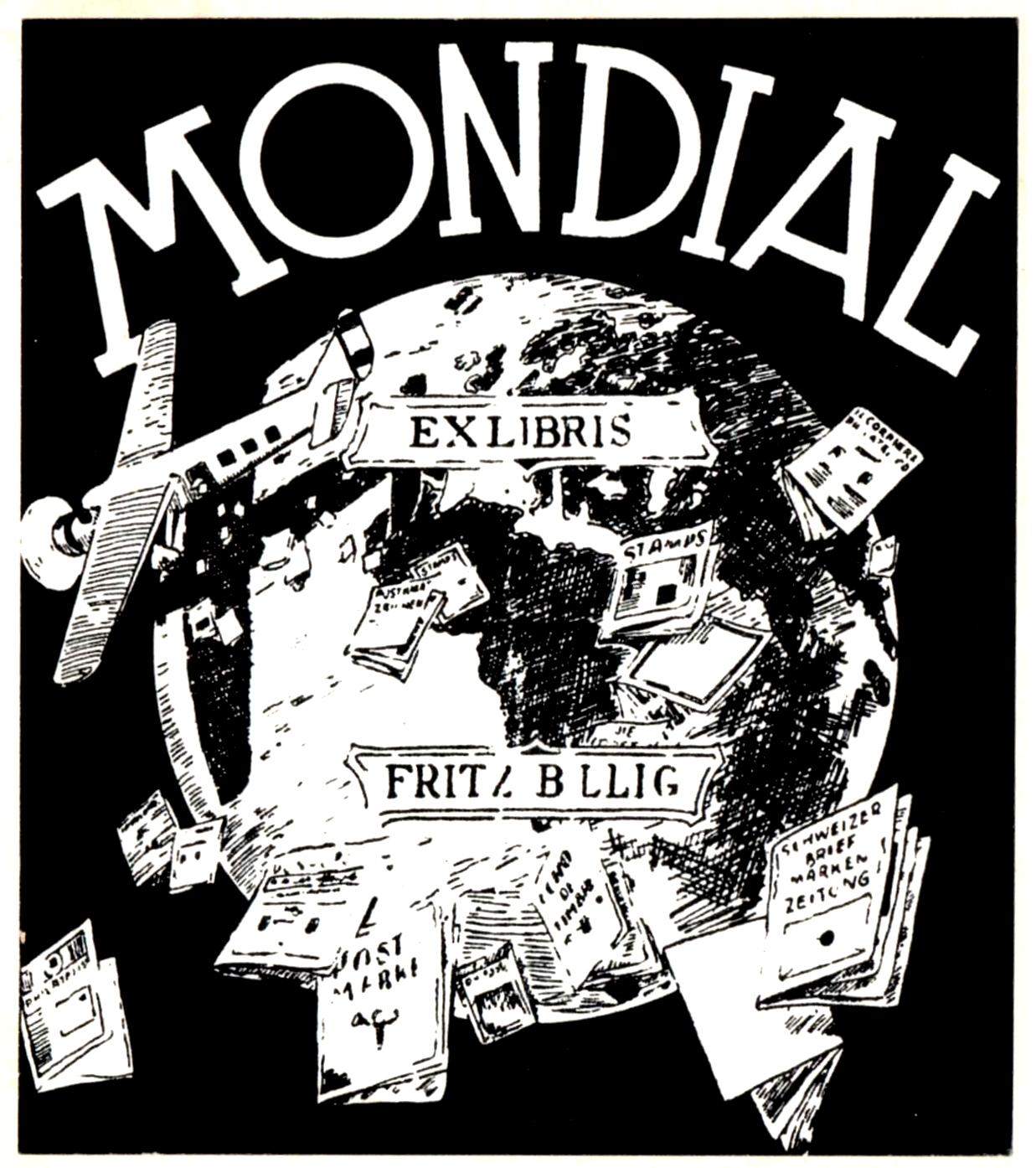
A Fritz Billig bookplate

Fritz F. Billig (1902–1986) was a Viennese philatelist and stamp dealer who fled to the United States after the Austrian Anschluss in 1938 and continued his career from Jamaica, New York. There he published a successful and long-running series of philatelic handbooks that are still regularly referred to by philatelists today.

== Life in Austria ==
Fritz F. Billig was born in 1902. He was a philatelist, stamp dealer, and philatelic author and with Otto E. Stiedl produced a 44 part handbook of philatelic forgeries between 1933 and 1938. He began to publish his handbook on postmarks in German which was continued in English from volume 8 in 1949. Publications by Billig won a silver medal at the Jubilee exhibition in Budapest 1934, the Prize of Honor at NABA Zurich 1934 and a bronze medal at OSTROPA 1935.

In 1936 he founded and was the editor of the Mondial index to philatelic literature which was published loose-leaf in three languages and ran to over 200 pages before it was abandoned. He appeared in the 1938 Blue Book of Philately where his address was given as 1 Herreng 6/4, Vienna, Austria, however, he was forced to flee to the United States after the Anschluss where he continued his career in Jamaica, New York.

== United States ==
In the United States at the outbreak of the Second World War, Billig temporarily changed his name to Fritz Billings in order to avoid the anti-German sentiment current at the time and traded as the Billings Stamp Co. His former partner in Vienna, Fred Rich, joined Billig in New York in 1945 and they operated the auction firm of Billig & Rich Inc. at 55 West 42nd Street in New York.

From 1939 he began to publish Billig's Specialized Catalogues which eventually ran to 11 volumes, and from 1942, Billig's Philatelic Handbooks which reached 44 volumes.

== Later life ==
In the late 1960s, the firm of HJMR Co. of Miami Beach, Florida, succeeded to Billig's business and reprinted the Billig Handbooks. Billig died in 1986.

== Publications as author or publisher ==
- Expert Billig's Großes Handbuch der Fälschungen - 44 Parts 1933-38, published in German by Fritz Billig (with Otto E. Stiedl), Vienna.
  - No. 1, 1933, Kirchenstaat (Roman States)
  - No. 2, 1934, Bremen
  - No. 3, 1934, Hanover
  - No. 4, 1934, Braunschweig
  - No. 5, 1934, Lubeck
  - No. 6, 1934, Baden
  - No. 7, 1934, Bergendorf
  - No. 8, Modena
  - No. 9, Romagna
  - No. 10, 1934, Bayern
  - No. 11, 1935, Hamburg
  - No. 12, 1935, Mecklenburg-Schwerin
  - No. 13, 1935, Elsass-Lothringen
  - No. 14, Thurn und Taxis
  - No. 15, 1935, Sachsen
  - No. 16, 1935, Schleswig - Holstein
  - No. 17, 1935, Oldenburg
  - No. 18, 1935, Wurttemberg
  - No. 19, 1935, Helgoland
  - No. 20, 1935, Sizilien
  - No. 21, Parma
  - No. 22, 1935, Toskana
  - No. 23, 1936, Neapel
  - No. 24, Sardinien
  - No. 25, 1935, Italien
  - No. 26, Lombardei-Venetien
  - No. 27, 1938, Montenegro,
  - No. 28, 1936, Sowjet-Russland,
  - No. 29, Samos
  - No. 30, 1936, Sebien, $25.50
  - No. 31, 1936, Griece I
  - No. 32, Griece II, no 31 & 32
  - No. 33, Russland, Kaiserreich und Levante
  - No. 34, Bulgaria
  - No. 35, Bosnia-Herzeguina, S.H.S. I
  - No. 36, Bosnia-Herzeguina, S.H.S. II, no 35 & 36
  - No. 37, 1937, Turkey I, 28 pages, card
  - No. 38, Turkey II, 24 pages, card, no. 37 & 38, $55.00, sold
  - No. 39, 1937, Luxemburgh, $25.50
  - No. 40, 1937, Belgien, 34 pages, card
  - No. 41, 1937, Belgisch-Kongo, enquire first
  - No. 42, 1938, Rumania I, Moldau-Walachei
  - No. 43, 1938, Rumania, II
  - No. 44, 1938, Rumania, III
- Billig's Handbooks on Postmarks (in English language from Vol. 8 onwards)
  - Vol. 1 Schweiz, Svizzera & Suisse, R. Botta.
  - Vol. 2 Baden, A. Grossmann.
  - Vol. 3 Italien, Italia & Italie, Prof. A. Carozzi.
  - Vol. 4 Lombardei & Lombardo-Veneto, Fritz Billig.
  - Vol. 5 Sizilien & Sicilia, Fritz Billig.
  - Vol. 6 Oesterreich & Austria-Italy Annullamenti, Fritz Billig, 1935.
  - Vol. 7 Samos, Ernst Hartmann.
  - Vol. 8 United States County and Postmaster Postmarks, H.K. Thompson, 1949.
  - Vol. 9 British Postmarks, with reference to the "1844" and subsequent numbered obliterations. F. Hugh Vallancey, 1950.
  - Vol. 10 Japan Scenery Postmarks, Dr. H.K. Thompson, 1956.
  - Vol. 11 Postal Markings of the Allied Forces in Great Britain, 1940-46, Norman Hill.
  - Vol. 12 Illustrated Handbook of U.S. Naval Postmarks, Part I.
  - Vol. 13 Postal Markings of Spain, Theo. Van Dam, 1965.
- Mondial index to philatelic literature. 1936. Loose leaf. Discontinued c. 1938.
- Billig's Specialized Catalogues
  - Vol. 1 Austria, 1939.
  - Vol. 2 Czechoslovakia, German language, 1937. (Second edition, English language, 1942)
  - Vol. 3 Norway: The Plating of the First Issues, J. Jellestad, A, Odfjell & J. Anderssen, 1948.
  - Vol. 4 Greece, 1948. The Large Hermes Head.
  - Vol. 5 France Plating of the 20 Centimes Blue Laureated, General Dumont, 1950.
  - Vol. 6 Handbook of the Private Local Posts, edited by E.F. Hurt & L.N. & M. Williams, 1950.
  - Vol. 7 Canada: Catalogue of constant plate varieties, Hans Reiche, 1954.
  - Vol. 8 Rocket Mail, Stephen H. Smith, 1955. (Supplement 1958)
  - Vol. 9 Canada War Tax, The War Tax Study Group, Hans Reiche Chairman, 1959.
  - Vol. 10 Czechoslovakia, First Issue: The Hradcany, J. Velek, 1961.
  - Vol. 11 A Catalogue of the Revenue Stamps of France, Brainerd Kremer, 1962.
- Billig's Philatelic Handbooks
  - 44 Volumes of mixed content from 1942. (see links below)
