= Williams Papers =

Philatelic research papers

The Williams Papers are the research papers from 1940 to 1999 of noted philatelic authors Leon Norman & Maurice Williams for their books and articles. The papers form part of the British Library Philatelic Collections.
