= Johannes Bodaeus van Stapel =

Dutch doctor and botanist

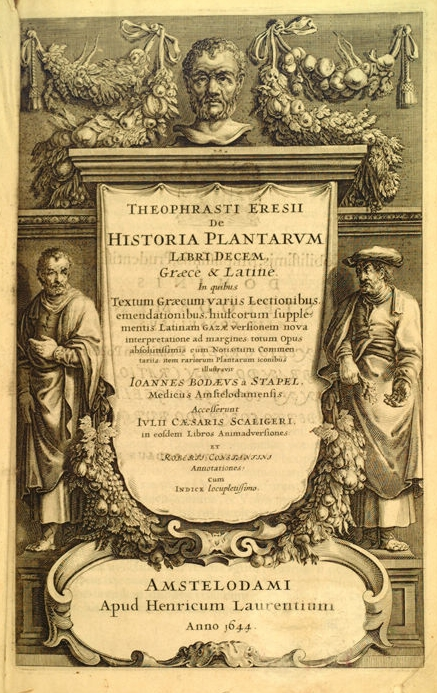
- Born: 1602; Amsterdam, Dutch Republic
- Died: 1636 (aged 33–34); Amsterdam, Dutch Republic
- Scientific career
- Fields: Medicine, Botany

Johannes Bodaeus van Stapel (in Latin Ioannes Bodaeus a Stapel, in Italian Giovanni Bodeo da Stapel or Giovanni Bodeo da Stapelio, in French Jean/Johannes Bodaeus de Stapel or in Stapel), born in 1602 in Amsterdam, in the Dutch Republic, and died in 1636 in the same city, was a Dutch botanist and doctor.

== Biography ==
Giovanni Bodeo da Stapelio was born in Amsterdam in the early 17th century. His father, the physician Engelberto Stapel sent him to study in Leiden where his interest in botany was born. During his medical studies in Leiden, he was trained in botany by Adolphus Vorstius (1597-1663).

== Work ==
He is known for his work on the Latin version of Theophrastus' Historia plantarum, completed before his death in 1636 and published posthumously in Amsterdam in 1644 by his father. This work is an essential reference for western botanists of the time.

The Latin translation is that of Theodorus Gaza. This Latin version has 1,200 pages, with 50 black and white illustrations, out of text. The drawings of the plants and their parts are very schematic but very faithful to reality. Over the comments, Stapelio takes the opportunity to illustrate in an almost encyclopedic way the various botanical species and their applications. His colleagues,including the humanists Caspar Barlaeus and Petrus Scriverius dedicated liminary poems to him in Latin, while Samuel Naeranus added one in Greek. Carl Linnaeus named, in his honor, the genus Stapelia of the family Apocynaceae.
