= Hans Reiche =

- Born: 28 November 1914; Berlin, Kingdom of Prussia, German Empire
- Died: 30 September 2000 (aged 85)
- Occupation: Philatelist

Hans Reiche (28 November 1914 – 30 September 2000) was an electrical engineer and philatelist who became a world authority on Canadian stamps.

== Life ==
Born in Berlin, Reiche received a Master of Science degree in electrical engineering from the Technische Hochschule in Charlottenburg (now Technische Universität Berlin) in 1936, before travelling first to England in 1939, where he was interned after the start of World War Two, and then to Camp Monteith in Ontario, Canada in 1940. He was released in 1942 with the help of Albert Einstein, who was a friend of the family, and he then started a long career working for the Canadian Government.

His father was the noted physicist Fritz Reiche who studied with Max Planck. Hans and his mother Bertha, donated Fritz's papers to the Center for History of Physics, American Institute of Physics after his death in 1969. Hans' mother, formerly Bertha Ochs, was the daughter of the composer Professor Siegfried Ochs, the founder and conductor of the Berlin Philharmonic Choir.

Non-philatelic documents about Hans Reiche and his family are held in the Ottawa Jewish Archives.

== Philatelic interests ==
Reiche's main philatelic interests were Canadian constant plate varieties, about which he was a prolific author, Canadian pre-cancels and old German states. At different times he received the Bronze, Silver and Gold Medals of the German Philatelic Society.

He was prominent in many philatelic organisations including the British North America Philatelic Society, The Ottawa Philatelic Society, The Canadian Philatelic Society of Great Britain (Fellow 1979), The Royal Philatelic Society of Canada (Fellow 1982) and others. Reiche was a constant contributor to the newsletters and journals of philatelic organisations. Particularly notable was "Postmarked Ottawa" in The Canadian Philatelist, the official journal of the Royal Philatelic Society of Canada.

After his death, Reiche's philatelic papers were acquired by the Canadian Postal Archives, part of the National Archives of Canada.

== Selected publications ==
- Canada: Catalogue of constant plate varieties (Billig's Specialized Catalogues Vol.7), Fritz Billig, Jamaica, New York, 1954.
- Canada, the Admiral stamps of 1911 to 1925. (Two volumes)
- Canada Steel Engraved Constant Plate Varieties, 1982.
- Admiral Colour Identification.
