= Mary Letitia Green =

British botanist (1886–1978)

Mary Letitia Sprague (née Green) (1886–1978) was a British botanist and bibliographer who worked at Kew Gardens. In 1938 she married Scottish botanist Thomas Archibald Sprague, the Deputy Keeper of the Kew Herbarium, and together they compiled several supplements to the Index Kewensis. She was an expert on Loranthaceae. The standard author abbreviation M.L.Green is used to indicate this person as the author when citing a botanical name.

She revised Arthur Fenton Hort's translation of Linnaeus' Critica Botanica, for an edition published by the Linnean Society of London in 1938, with an Introduction by Arthur William Hill.
