= Arthur Hort =

Sir Arthur Fenton Hort, 6th Baronet (1864–1935) was a schoolmaster at Harrow School. He is known for his translation of Theophrastus's Enquiry into Plants.

== Biography ==
Arthur Fenton Hort was born in 1864 to Fanny Henrietta Hort and the biblical scholar Fenton John Anthony Hort. He was educated in Classics and became a fellow of Trinity College, Cambridge, and worked as a schoolmaster at Harrow School, London, where he became a housemaster; he was interested in gardening. He married Helen Frances Bell in 1894. In 1904 he succeeded a cousin to became the 6th Hort baronet of Castle Strange.

== Works ==
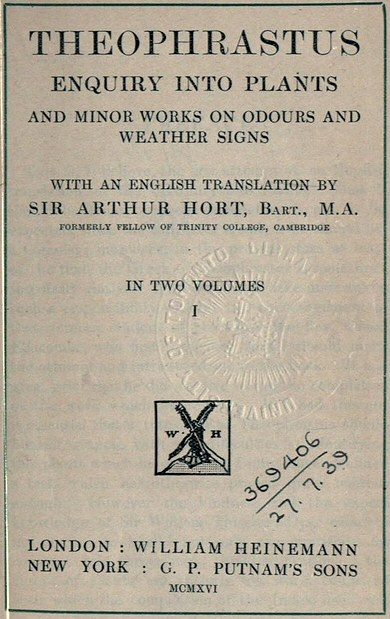
Title page of Sir Arthur Hort's edition of Theophrastus's Enquiry into Plants with parallel Greek and English text, 1916

- Life and Letters of Fenton John Anthony Hort (1896) Part 1 Part 2
- (ed.) The Gospel According to St Mark (1907)
- (ed.) Books I and II by Livy
- (ed.) Book V by Livy
- (ed.) Selection from 'Hercules Furens' by Euripides
- (tr). Enquiry into Plants by Theophrastus (1916) (in two volumes). London: William Heinemann, and New York: G. P. Putnam's Sons.
- Brian Piers Lascelles: A Memoir (1924)
- The Unconventional Garden (1928)
- Garden Variety (1935)
- (tr. with Mary Letitia Green) The "Critica Botanica" of Linnaeus by Carl Linnaeus (1938)
