= Buhr Park =

Park in Michigan, United States of America

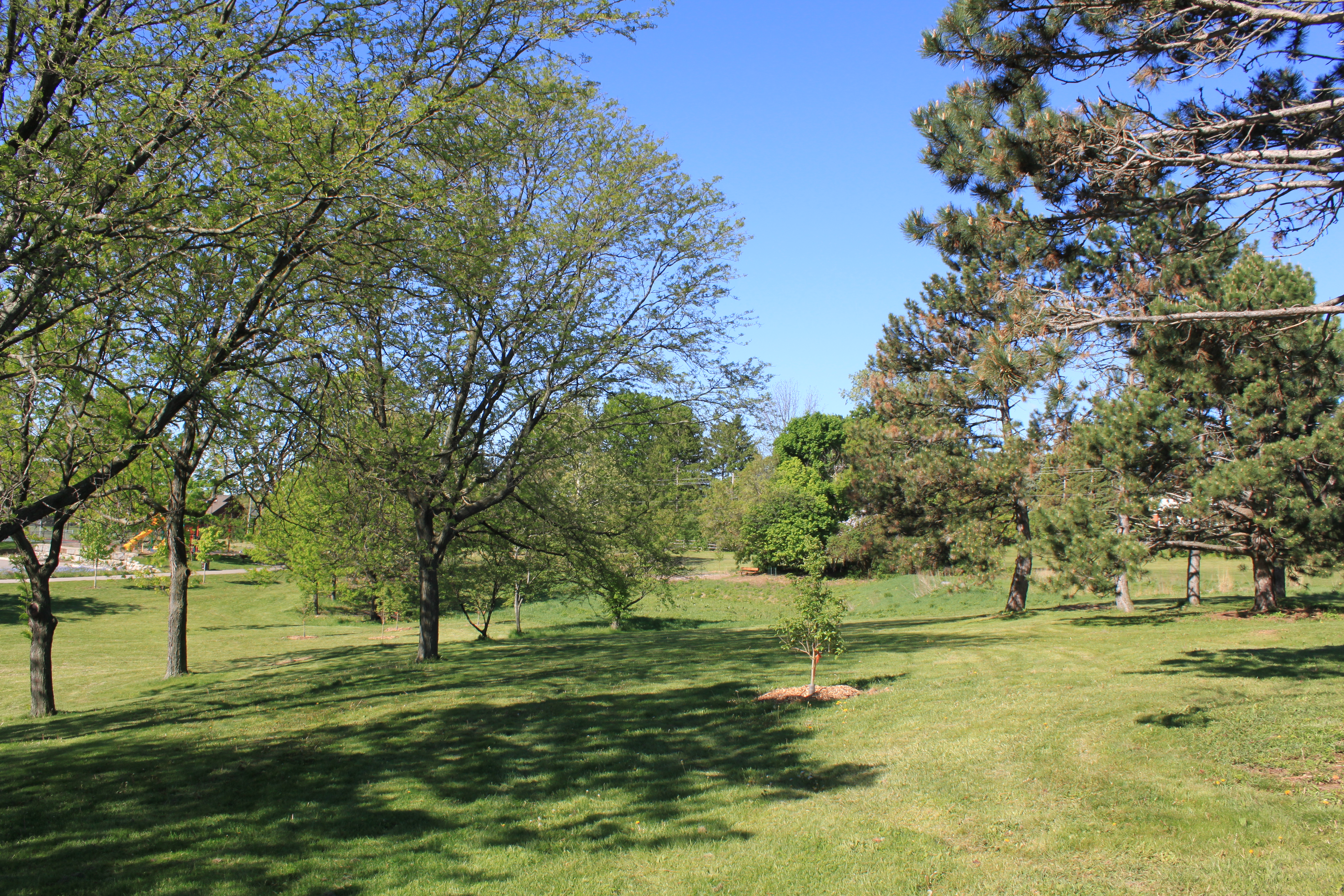
- Buhr Park wooded area

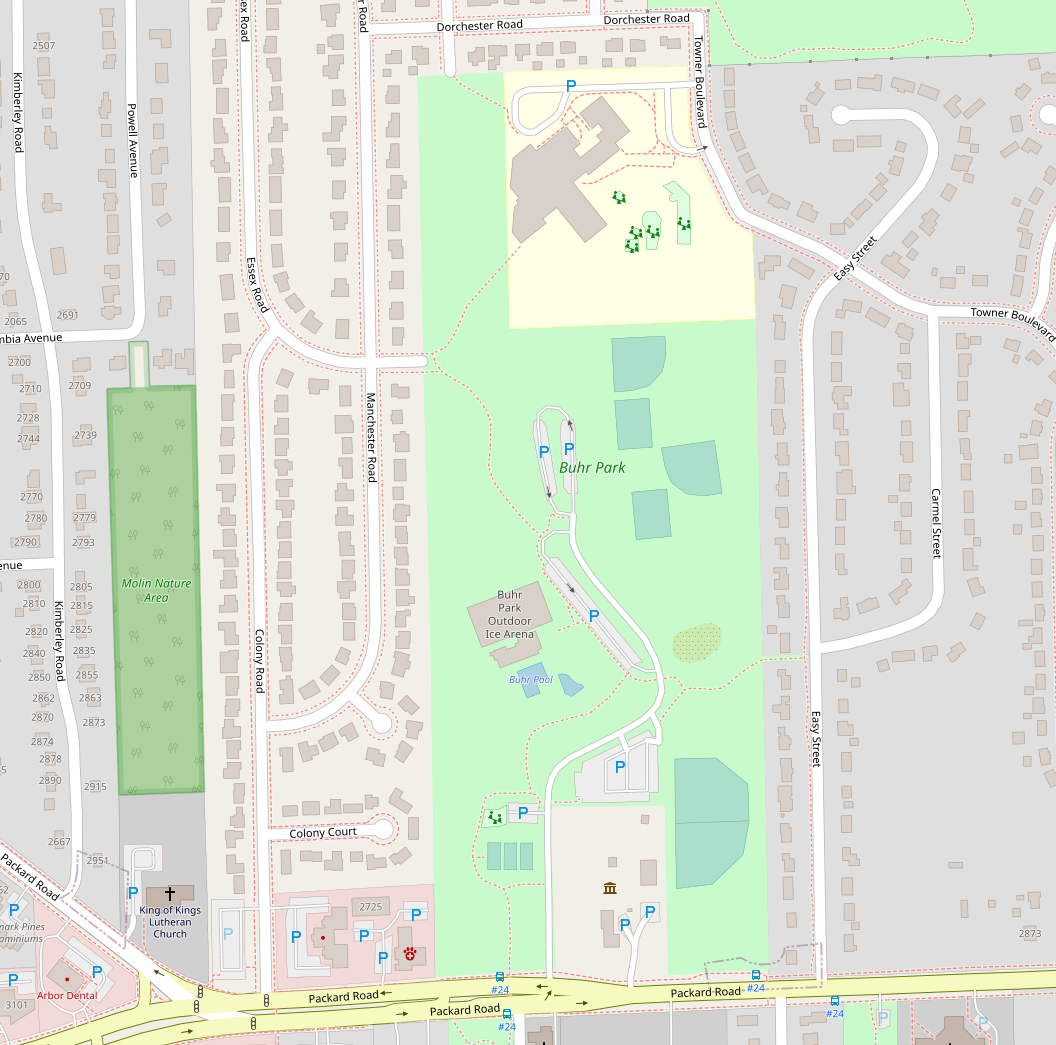
- Map of Buhr Park
- Type: Public park
- Location: Ann Arbor, Michigan
- Coordinates: 42°14′51″N 83°42′38″W
- Area: 39 acres (16 ha)
- Operator: City of Ann Arbor Parks and Recreation
- Status: Open all year, 6am-10pm

Buhr Park is a 39-acre public park in Ann Arbor, Michigan.

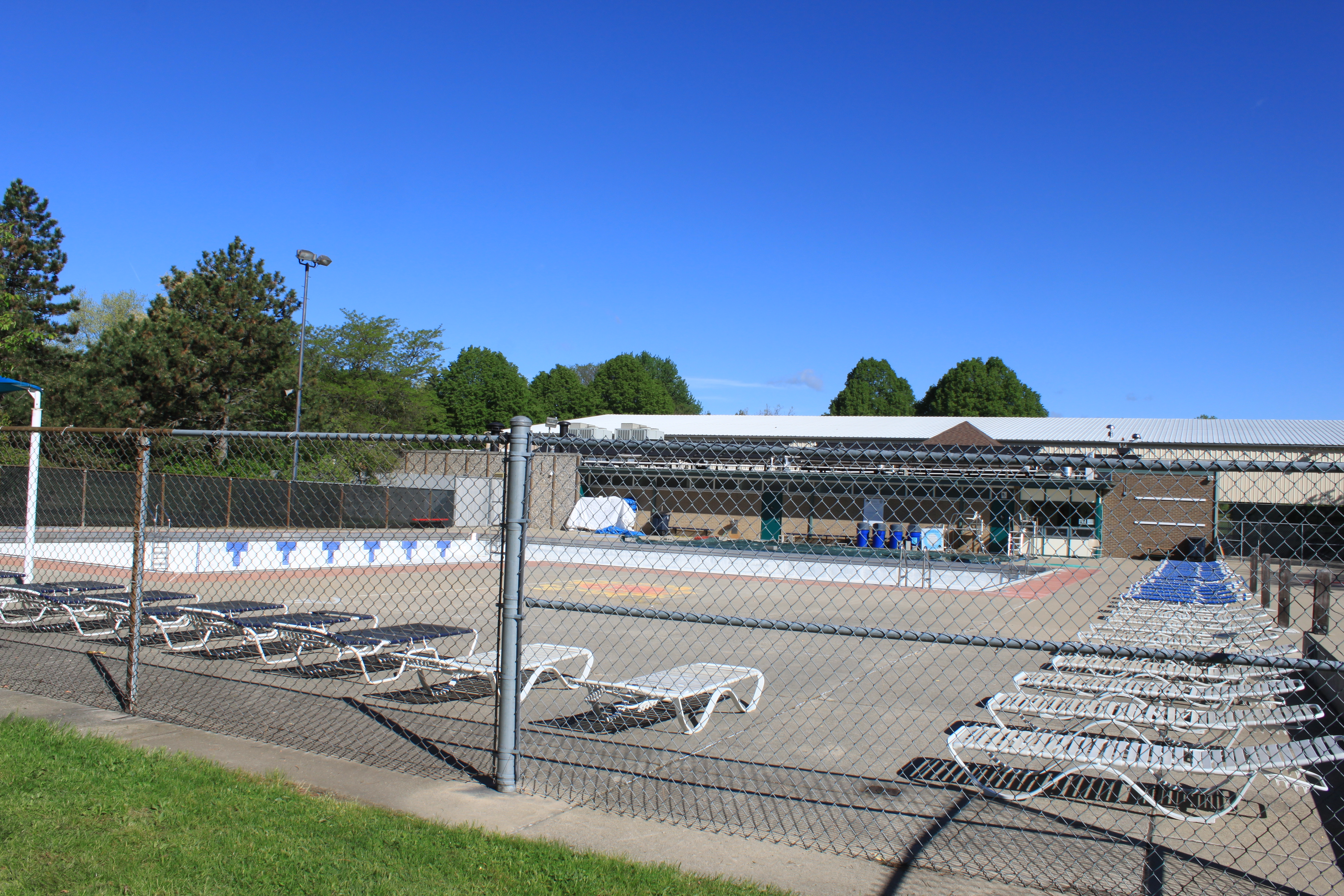
Buhr Park swimming pool

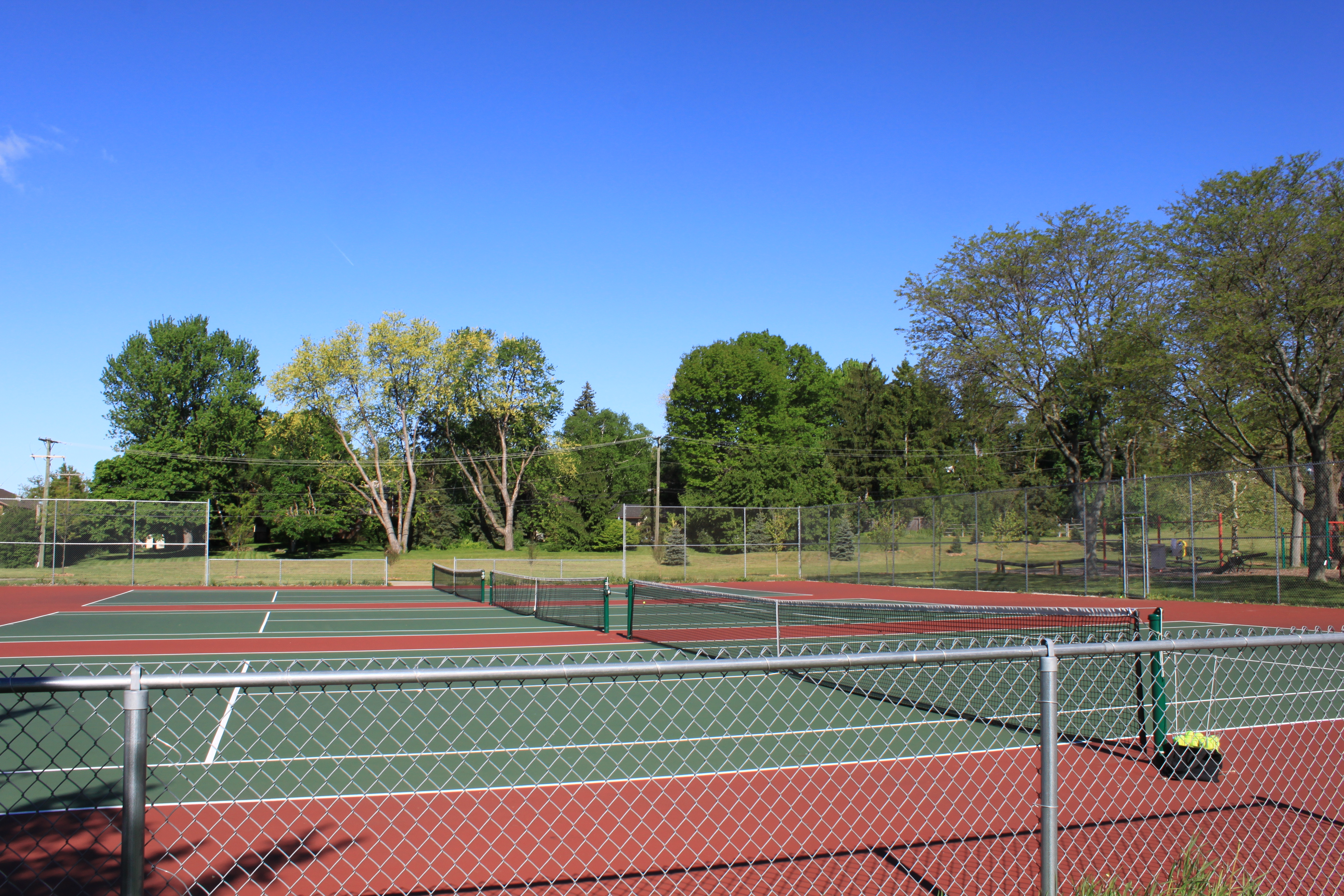
Buhr Park tennis courts

There is a large public swimming pool and a smaller children's wading pool with interactive toys. Buhr Park also includes 39 acres (160,000 m^{2}) of rolling hills, picnic areas with barbecue grills, a children's play area, softball diamonds, soccer fields and outdoor tennis courts. The Cobblestone Farm and Museum is located on the park grounds.

The Buhr Outdoor Ice Arena and Cross Country Ski Center facilitates winter sports such as ice skating and hockey. It provides groomed trails for skiing set by snowmobile as well as rental, equipment, locker rooms, etc.

The Buhr Park Children's Wet Meadow is a group of wet meadow ecosystems designed as an educational opportunity for school-age children.
