= Erik F. Hurt =

- Born: 1890
- Died: 30 January 1952 (aged 61–62)
- Engineering career
- Projects: Expert on worldwide postal history; wrote extensively on the subject
- Awards: APS Hall of Fame

Erik F. Hurt (1890–1952), of England, was a philatelist named to the Hall of Fame of the American Philatelic Society.

== Collecting interests ==
Hurt was a student of postal history even as a teenager and eventually specialized in the study of local post stamps of the world.

== Philatelic literature ==
Hurt wrote extensively on the subject of stamp collecting, but concentrated his writing efforts on the subject of local posts, such as his article on The Mail Service To and From Greenland under the Royal Greenland Company. He also co-authored The Danube Steam Navigation Company with fellow author Denwood Kelly.

He also edited and published several journals: The Record of Philately and the specialized local post journal, The Illustrated Philatelic Record. He also co-authored with Leon Norman Williams and his brother Maurice Williams, the Priced Catalogue of Local Postage Stamps, which was later expanded and published as Handbook of the Private Local Posts as part of Fritz Billig's Philatelic Handbook series.

== Honors and awards ==
Erik F. Hurt was named to the American Philatelic Society Hall of Fame in 1953.

== See also ==
- Local post
- Philatelic literature
