= Hydric soil =

Soil saturated by water

Hydric soil is soil which is permanently or seasonally saturated by water, resulting in anaerobic conditions, as found in wetlands.

== Overview ==
Most soils are aerobic. This is important because plant roots respire (that is, they consume oxygen and carbohydrates while releasing carbon dioxide) and there must be sufficient air—especially oxygen—in the soil to support most forms of soil life. Air normally moves through interconnected pores by forces such as changes in atmospheric pressure, the flushing action of rainwater, and by simple diffusion.

In addition to plant roots, most forms of soil microorganisms need oxygen to survive. This is true of the more well-known soil animals as well, such as ants, earthworms and moles. But soils can often become saturated with water due to rainfall and flooding. Gas diffusion in soil slows (some 10,000 times slower) when soil becomes saturated with water because there are no open passageways for air to travel. When oxygen levels become limited, intense competition arises between soil life forms for the remaining oxygen. When this anaerobic environment continues for long periods during the growing season, quite different biological and chemical reactions begin to dominate, compared with aerobic soils. In soils where saturation with water is prolonged and is repeated for many years, unique soil properties usually develop that can be recognized in the field. Soils with these unique properties are called hydric soils, and although they may occupy a relatively small portion of the landscape, they maintain important soil functions in the environment.

The plants found in hydric soils often have aerenchyma, internal spaces in stems and rhizomes, that allow atmospheric oxygen to be transported to the rooting zone. Hence, many wetlands are dominated by plants with aerenchyma; common examples include cattails, sedges and water-lilies.

== Technical definitions ==
=== United States ===
A hydric soil is defined by federal law to mean "soil that, in its undrained condition, is saturated, flooded, or ponded long enough during a growing season to develop an anaerobic condition that supports the growth and regeneration of hydrophytic vegetation". This term is part of the legal definition of a wetland included in the United States Food Security Act of 1985 (P.L. 99-198). This definition is provided in the controlling regulations to the Wetland Conservation Provisions of the FSA of 1985(7 C.F.R 12) and is used by the U.S.D.A. Natural Resources Conservation Service in the administration of the Wetland Conservation Compliance provisions ("Swampbuster") contained in the FSA of 1985. In adopting this definition in 1985, Congress attempted to capture the duration of waterlogged condition of a hydric soil by adding that a hydric soil is waterlogged long enough to support not only the growth of plants adapted to life in anaerobic conditions but also the regeneration of such plants.

Another common definition of a hydric soils is provided by the National Technical Committee of Hydric Soils (NTCHS) as "a soil that formed under conditions of saturation, flooding, or ponding long enough during the growing season to develop anaerobic conditions in the upper part." The NTCHS hydric soil definition is used by the U.S. Army Corps of Engineers and the Environmental Protection Agency in their joint responsibilities in the administration of Section 404 of the Clean Water Act (1972).

== See also ==
- Acid sulfate soil – Soils formed under waterlogged conditions
- Blue goo – Type of soil
- Gley soil – Saturated soil type
- Mesic habitat – Habitat with moderate moisture
- Wade Hurt (soil scientist) – American soil scientist (died 2021)
- Xeric – Biome with 250 mm of annual rainfall or less

== Bibliography ==
- Environmental Laboratory. 1987. Corps of Engineers Wetland Delineation Manual, Technical Report Y-87-1, U.S. Army Engineer Waterways Experiment Station, Vicksburg, Miss. Url (pdf) last accessed 2006-04-16
- Soil Conservation Service. 1994. National Food Security Act Manual. Title 180. USDA Soil Conservation Service, Washington, D.C.
- Soil Survey Staff. 1999. Soil Taxonomy: A Basic System of Soil Classification for Making and Interpreting Soil Surveys. USDA Natural Resources Conservation Service, Agric. Hdbk. 436, U.S. Government Printing Office, Washington, D.C. 869 pp.
- Soil Survey Staff. 1994. National Soil Survey Handbook. USDA Soil Conservation Service, Washington, D.C.
