= Hallam Hurt =

American neonatologist

Hallam Hurt is an American neonatologist. She is "the medical director of Special Babies Clinic and an attending neonatologist at CHOP Newborn Care at the Hospital of the University of Pennsylvania". As of 2013, she was also a professor of pediatrics at the University of Pennsylvania.

== Education and career ==
Hurt received her B.S. in government from Sweet Briar College and her M.D. from the University of Virginia School of Medicine. Prior to working at CHOP, she was the chair of neonatology at Einstein Medical Center in Philadelphia.

== Research ==
Hurt is known for a study she began in 1988, while at Einstein Medical Center, looking at the effects of prenatal cocaine exposure on adult development outcomes. The study, one of the longest and most long-term of its kind, included 224 babies born between 1989 and 1992 at Einstein, half of whom were born to cocaine-using mothers and half who were not. This study found no difference between children exposed to cocaine in utero and those who had not with respect to multiple evaluations, including creativity and IQ tests. She and her colleagues did, however, find that both groups of children, who both came from low-income families, had much lower-than-average IQs.
