= Hort baronets =

Title in the Baronetage of Great Britain

Escutcheon of the Hort baronets of Castle Strange

The Hort baronetcy, of Castle Strange in the County of Middlesex, is a title in the Baronetage of Great Britain. It was created on 8 September 1767 for John Hort, Consul-General at Lisbon, Portugal. He was the second son of Josiah Hort, Archbishop of Tuam.

The 2nd Baronet sat as Member of Parliament for County Kildare from 1831 to 1832. The 3rd Baronet was a Lieutenant-General in the British Army and fought in the Crimean War.

== Hort baronets, of Castle Strange (1767) ==
- Sir John Hort, 1st Baronet (1735–1807)
- Sir Josiah William Hort, 2nd Baronet (1791–1876)
- Sir John Josiah Hort, 3rd Baronet (1824–1882)
- Sir William Fitzmaurice Hort, 4th Baronet (1827–1887)
- Sir Fenton Josiah Hort, 5th Baronet (1836–1902)
- Sir Arthur Fenton Hort, 6th Baronet (1864–1935), author, schoolmaster and gardener
- Sir Fenton George Hort, 7th Baronet (1896–1960)
- Sir James Fenton Hort, 8th Baronet (1926–1995)
- Sir Andrew Edwin Fenton Hort, 9th Baronet (born 1954)

The heir apparent is the present holder's son James John Fenton Hort (born 1989).

== Extended family ==
The theologian Fenton John Anthony Hort was a grandson of the 1st Baronet.

== Notes ==
Baronetage of Great Britain
Preceded by Foley baronets	Hort baronets of Castle Strange; 8 September 1767	Succeeded by Denis baronets
