= Wade Hurt (soil scientist) =

American soil scientist (died 2021)

G. Wade Hurt was a soil scientist in the United States and an authority on hydric soils. As of 2007, he was a position with the University of Florida's Soil and Water Science Department in Gainesville.

Hurt retired from the Natural Resources Conservation Service (NRCS) in 2007. He served as NRCS National Leader for Hydric Soils. Wade received his bachelor's degree from Mississippi State University.

Hurt died on August 13, 2021.

== Editor ==
Wade Hurt served as editor for several editions of Field Indicators of Hydric Soils, a technical reference used to identify wetland areas that fall under US jurisdiction as defined by the Clean Water Act.

== Educator ==
Wade Hurt taught hydric soils classes for soil science undergraduate and graduate students as well as environmental professionals. Classes teach theoretical, morphologic, and regulatory criteria used for delineating wetlands, siting septic drain fields, and identifying seasonal high water table elevation.
