= F. J. A. Hort =

Irish-born British Anglican theologian (1828–1892)

The Reverend F. J. A. Hort FSA
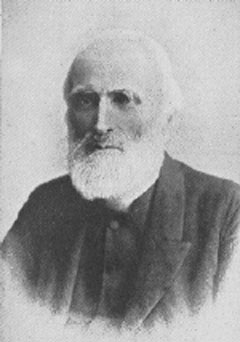
- Born: Fenton John Anthony Hort; 23 April 1828; Dublin, Ireland
- Died: 30 November 1892 (aged 64); Cambridge, England
- Spouse: Fanny Dyson (m. 1857)

Ecclesiastical career
- Religion: Christianity (Anglican)
- Church: Church of England
- Ordained: 1854 (deacon); 1856 (priest)

Academic background
- Education: Trinity College, Cambridge
- Influences: F. D. Maurice

Academic work
- Discipline: Theology
- Institutions: Emmanuel College, Cambridge
- Notable works: The New Testament in the Original Greek (1881)

Fenton John Anthony Hort FSA (23 April 1828 – 30 November 1892), known as F. J. A. Hort, was an Irish-born theologian and editor, with Brooke Foss Westcott of a critical edition of The New Testament in the Original Greek.

== Life ==
He was born on 23 April 1828 in Dublin, the great-grandson of Josiah Hort, Archbishop of Tuam in the eighteenth century. In 1846 he passed from Rugby School to Trinity College, Cambridge, where he was the contemporary of E. W. Benson, B. F. Westcott and J. B. Lightfoot. The four men became lifelong friends and fellow workers. In 1850 Hort took his degree, being third in the classical tripos. In 1851 he also took the recently established triposes in moral science and natural science, and in 1852 he became fellow of his college. In 1854, in conjunction with John E. B. Mayor and Lightfoot, he established the Journal of Classical and Sacred Philology, and plunged eagerly into theological and patristic study. He had been brought up in the strictest principles of the evangelical movement, but at Rugby, under the influence of Thomas Arnold and Archibald Campbell Tait, and through his acquaintance with F. D. Maurice and Charles Kingsley, he finally moved towards liberalism.

In 1857 he married Fanny Henrietta Holland. Their son Arthur Fenton Hort was born in 1864; he would become a classicist and in 1904 inherit the Hort baronetcy.

Giving up his fellowship on marriage, Hort accepted the college living of St Ippolyts, near Hitchin, in Hertfordshire, where he remained for fifteen years. During his time there he took part in discussions on university reform, continued his studies, and wrote essays for various periodicals. In 1870 he was appointed a member of the committee for revising the translation of the New Testament, and in 1871 he delivered the Hulsean Lectures before the university. Their title was The Way, the Truth, and the Life, but they were not prepared for publication until many years after their delivery. In 1872 he accepted a fellowship and lectureship at Emmanuel College, Cambridge. In 1873 he became a fellow of the Society of Antiquaries of London. In 1878 he was made Hulsean Professor of Divinity and in 1887 Lady Margaret's Professor of Divinity.

Hort died on 30 November 1892 in Cambridge. He is buried in the Mill Road Cemetery, Cambridge.

== Works ==
In 1881 he published, with his friend Westcott, an edition of the text of the New Testament based on their text critical work. The Revision Committee had largely accepted this text, even before its publication, as a basis for their translation of the New Testament. Its appearance created a sensation among scholars, and it was attacked in many quarters, but on the whole, it was received as being much the nearest approximation yet made to the original text of the New Testament. The introduction was the work of Hort. His first principle was, "Knowledge of Documents should precede Final Judgments upon Readings".

Next to his Greek Testament, his best-known work is The Christian Ecclesia (1897). Other publications are: Judaistic Christianity (1894); Village Sermons (two series); Cambridge and other Sermons; Prolegomena to ... Romans and Ephesians (1895); The Ante-Nicene Fathers (1895); and two Dissertations, (1876) on the reading of a Greek word in John i.18, and on The Constantinopolitan and other Eastern Creeds in the Fourth Century. All are models of exact scholarship and skilful use of materials. His Life and Letters was edited by his son, Sir Arthur Hort, in two volumes published in 1896: Volume 1, Volume 2.

== Other ==
Hort was a member of the Cambridge Apostles and is credited with writing the oath of secrecy taken by new members, in or around 1851.

== See also ==
- Conflation of Readings
- Textus Receptus

Academic offices
Preceded by Frederic Farrar	Hulsean Lecturer; 1871	Succeeded by Josiah Pearson
Preceded by John Perowne	Hulsean Professor of Divinity; 1878 – c. 1887	Succeeded by Herbert Edward Ryle
Preceded by Charles Swainson	Lady Margaret's Professor of Divinity; 1887–1892	Succeeded by J. Rawson Lumby
