= Bible translations into English =

More than 100 complete translations of the Bible into English languages have been produced. (Note: Cf. List of English Bible translations#Complete Bibles) Translations of Biblical books, especially passages read in the Liturgy can be traced back to the late 7th century, including translations into Old and Middle English.

== Old English ==
The Old English language started first from the Angle-Jute-Saxon invaders/settlers in the South and Eastern regions, and evolved influenced by Anglo-Danish invaders/settlers in the North and Eastern Danelaw, to the extent that an Icelandic saga around the year 1000 said the language of England was the same as Norway and Denmark. It largely replaced the Neo-Brittonic languages and residual Anglo-Latin-using pockets.

While there were no complete translations of the Bible in the Old English period, there were many translations of large portions during this time. Parts of the Bible were first translated from the Latin Vulgate by a few monks and scholars. Such translations were generally in the form of prose or as interlinear glosses (literal translations above the Latin words).

Very few complete translations existed during that time. Most of the books of the Bible existed separately and were read as individual texts. Translations of the Bible often included the writer's own commentary on passages in addition to the literal translation.

Aldhelm, Bishop of Sherborne and Abbot of Malmesbury (639–709), is thought to have written an Old English translation of the Psalms.

Bede (c. 672–735) produced a translation of the Gospel of John into Old English, which he is said to have prepared shortly before his death. This translation is lost; we know of its existence from Cuthbert of Jarrow's account of Bede's death.

In the 10th century an Old English translation of the Gospels was made in the Lindisfarne Gospels: a word-for-word gloss inserted between the lines of the Latin text by Aldred, Provost of Chester-le-Street. This is the oldest extant translation of the Gospels into an English language.

The Wessex Gospels (also known as the West-Saxon Gospels) are a full translation of the four gospels into a West Saxon dialect of Old English. Produced in approximately 990, they are the first translation of all four gospels into English without the Latin text.

In the 11th century, Abbot Ælfric translated much of the Old Testament into Old English. The Old English Hexateuch is an illuminated manuscript of the first six books of the Old Testament (the Hexateuch).

== Middle English ==
There are no known complete translations (pandects) from early in this period, when Middle English emerged after Anglo-Norman replaced Old English (Anglo-Saxon and Anglo-Danish) as the aristocratic and secular court languages (1066), with Latin still the religious, diplomatic, scientific and ecclesiastical court language, and with parts of the country still speaking Cornish, and perhaps Cumbric.

The Ormulum is in Middle English of the 12th century. Like its Old English precursor from Ælfric, an abbot of Eynsham, it includes very little Biblical text, and focuses more on personal commentary. This style was adopted by many of the original English translators. For example, the story of the Wedding at Cana is almost 800 lines long, but fewer than 40 lines are in the actual translation of the text. An unusual characteristic is that the translation mimics Latin verse, and so is similar to the better known and appreciated 14th-century English poem Cursor Mundi.

Richard Rolle (1290–1349) wrote an English Psalter. Many religious works are attributed to Rolle, but it has been questioned how many are genuinely from his hand. Many of his works were concerned with personal devotion, and some were used by the Lollards.

Theologian John Wycliffe (c. 1320s–1384) is popularly credited with translating what is now known as Wycliffe's Bible, though it is not clear how much of the translation he himself did. Released in 1382, this was the first known complete translation of the Bible into English. This translation came out in two different versions. The earlier version ("EV") is characterised by a strong adherence to the word order of Latin, and is more difficult for native English speakers to comprehend. The later version ("LV") made more concessions to the native grammar of English.

Around the same period there were several other translations, which partially survive, such as the Paues Fortheenth Century Middle English New Testament.

== Early Modern and Modern English ==
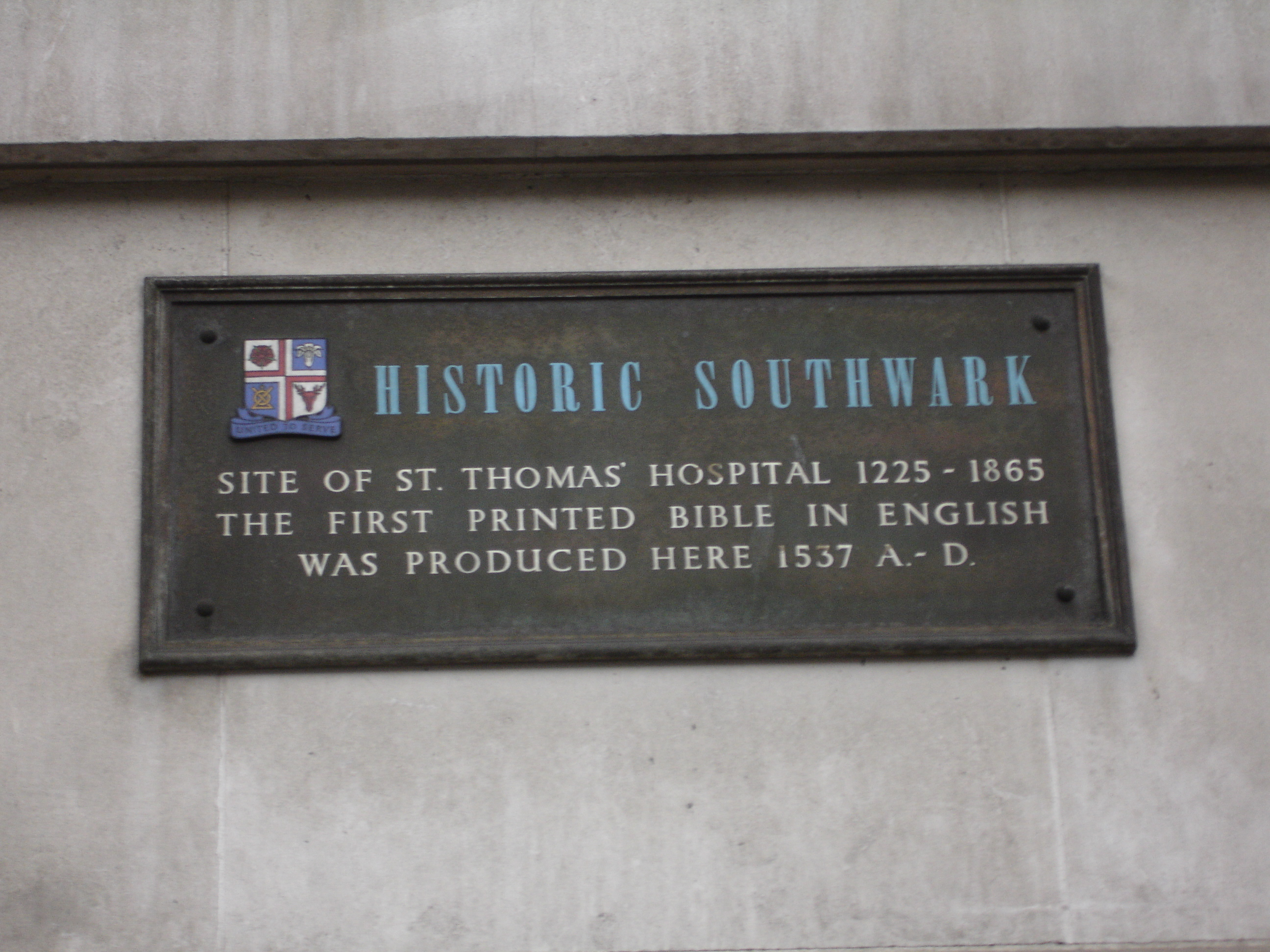
The site of St Thomas' Hospital in London was where the first modern English Bible was printed in England. (Note the error in the inscription: Miles Coverdale's Bible, 1535 pre-dated this).

=== Early Modern English ===
Early Modern English Bible translations are of between about 1500 and 1800, the period of Early Modern English. This was the first major period of Bible translation into the English language.

This period began with the introduction of the Tyndale Bible. The first complete edition of his New Testament was in 1526. William Tyndale used the Greek and Hebrew texts of the New Testament (NT) and Old Testament (OT) in addition to Jerome's Latin translation. He was the first translator to use the printing press – this enabled the distribution of several thousand copies of his New Testament translation throughout England. Tyndale did not complete his Old Testament translation.

The first printed English translation of the whole Bible was produced by Miles Coverdale in 1535, using Tyndale's work together with his own translations from the Latin Vulgate or German text. After much scholarly debate it is concluded that this was printed in Antwerp and the colophon gives the date as 4 October 1535. This first edition was adapted by Coverdale for his first "authorised version", known as the Great Bible, of 1539.

Other early printed versions were the Geneva Bible published by Sir Rowland Hill in 1560. This version is notable for being the first Bible divided into verses and which negated the Divine Right of Kings; the Bishop's Bible (1568), which was an attempt by Elizabeth I to create a new authorised version; and the Authorized King James Version of 1611.

The first complete Catholic Bible in English was the Douay–Rheims Bible, of which the New Testament portion was published in Rheims in 1582 and the Old Testament somewhat later in Douay in Gallicant Flanders. The Old Testament was completed by the time the New Testament was published but, due to extenuating circumstances and financial issues, it was not published until nearly three decades later, in two editions: the first released in 1609, and the rest of the OT in 1610. In this version, the seven deuterocanonical books are amongst the other books, as in the Latin Vulgate, rather than kept separate in an appendix.

=== Modern English ===
While early English Bibles were generally based on a small number of Greek texts, or on Latin translations, modern English translations of the Bible are based on a wider variety of manuscripts in the original languages, mostly Greek and Hebrew.

The translators put much scholarly effort into cross-checking the various sources such as the Septuagint, Textus Receptus, and Masoretic Text. Relatively recent discoveries such as the Dead Sea scrolls provide additional reference information. Some controversy has existed over which texts should be used as a basis for translation, as some of the alternate sources do not include phrases (or sometimes entire verses) which are found only in the Textus Receptus.

Some say the alternate sources were poorly representative of the texts used in their time, whereas others claim the Textus Receptus includes passages that were added to the alternate texts improperly. These controversial passages are not the basis for disputed issues of doctrine: they tend to be additional stories or snippets of phrases. Many modern English translations, such as the New International Version, contain limited text notes indicating where differences occur in original sources.

A somewhat greater number of textual differences are noted in the New King James Bible, indicating hundreds of New Testament differences between the Nestle-Aland, the Textus Receptus, and the Hodges edition of the Majority Text. The differences in the Old Testament are less well documented, but they do contain some references to differences between consonantal interpretations in the Masoretic Text, the Dead Sea Scrolls, and the Septuagint. Even with these hundreds of differences, however, a more complete listing is beyond the scope of most single-volume Bibles.

=== Individual translations ===
While most Bible translations are made by committees of scholars in order to avoid bias or idiosyncrasy, translations are sometimes made by individuals. The following, selected translations are largely the work of individual translators:

- Webster's Bible Translation — Noah Webster (1833)
- Young's Literal Translation — Robert Young (1862)
- Emphatic Diaglott — Benjamin Wilson (1864)
- Joseph Smith Translation — Joseph Smith (1867)
- The Holy Bible: Containing the Old and New Testaments; Translated Literally from the Original Tongues — Julia Evelina Smith (1876)
- Darby Bible — J.N. Darby (1890)
- Emphasized Bible — Joseph Bryant Rotherham (1902)
- The Modern Reader's Bible — Richard Green Moulton (1907)
- The Centenary Translation — Helen Barrett Montgomery (1924)
- The Holy Bible from Ancient Eastern Manuscripts — George Lamsa (1933)
- Bible in Basic English — S.H. Hooke (1949)
- The Holy Bible: A Translation From the Latin Vulgate in the Light of the Hebrew and Greek Originals (aka "Knox Bible") — Ronald Knox (1950)
- The Berkeley Version in Modern English — Gerrit Verkuyl (1959)
- Holy Name Bible containing the Holy Name Version of the Old and New Testaments — Angelo Traina (1963)
- The Living Bible — Kenneth N. Taylor (1971)
- The Bible in Living English — Stephen T. Byington (1972)
- Literal Translation of the Holy Bible — Jay P. Green (1985)
- God's New Covenant: A New Testament Translation — Heinz Cassirer (1989)
- The Complete Jewish Bible — David H. Stern (1998)
- American King James Version — Michael Engelbrite (1999)
- The Message — Eugene H. Peterson (2002)
- The Original Aramaic Bible in Plain English — David Bauscher (2010)
- The Bible — Nicholas King (2013)
- The New Testament: A Translation — David Bentley Hart (2017, 2023)
- The Hebrew Bible: A Translation with Commentary — Robert Alter (2018)

Individual translations of parts of the Bible include:

- Five Pauline Epistles, A New Translation — William Gunion Rutherford (1900)
- The New Testament in Modern English — J.B. Phillips (1958)
- The New Testament for Everyone — N. T. Wright (2023)

=== Jewish translations ===
Jewish English Bible translations are modern English Bible translations that include the books of the Hebrew Bible (Tanakh) according to the Masoretic Text, and according to the traditional division and order of Torah, Nevi'im, and Ketuvim.

Jewish translations often also reflect traditional Jewish interpretations of the Bible, as opposed to the Christian understanding that is often reflected in non-Jewish translations. For example, Jewish translations translate עלמה ‘almâh in Isaiah 7:14 as young woman, while many Christian translations render the word as virgin.

While modern biblical scholarship is similar for both Christians and Jews, there are distinctive features of Jewish translations, even those created by academic scholars. These include the avoidance of Christological interpretations, adherence to the Masoretic Text (at least in the main body of the text, as in the new Jewish Publication Society (JPS) translation) and greater use of classical Jewish exegesis. Some translations prefer names transliterated from the Hebrew, though the majority of Jewish translations use the Anglicized forms of biblical names.

The first English Jewish translation of the Bible into English was by Isaac Leeser in the 19th century.

The JPS produced two of the most popular Jewish translations, namely the JPS The Holy Scriptures of 1917 and the NJPS Tanakh (first printed in a single volume in 1985, second edition in 1999).

Since the 1980s there have been multiple efforts among Orthodox publishers to produce translations that are not only Jewish, but also adhere to Orthodox norms. Among these are The Living Torah and Nach by Aryeh Kaplan and others, the Torah and other portions in an ongoing project by Everett Fox, and the ArtScroll Tanakh.

== Approaches to translation ==
Modern translations take different approaches to the rendering of the original languages. The approaches can usually be considered to be somewhere on a scale between the two extremes:

- Formal equivalence (sometimes called literal translation) in which the greatest effort is made to preserve the meaning of individual words and phrases in the original, with relatively less regard for its understandability by modern readers. Examples include the King James Version, English Standard Version, Literal Standard Version, Revised Standard Version, New Revised Standard Version and New American Standard Bible.
- Dynamic equivalence (or functional equivalence, sometimes paraphrastic translation) in which the translator attempts to render the sense and intent of the original. Examples include The Living Bible and The Message.

Some translations have been motivated by a strong theological distinctive. In the Sacred Name Bibles the conviction that God's name be preserved in a Semitic form is followed. The Purified Translation of the Bible promotes the idea that Jesus and early Christians drink grape juice not wine. The Jehovah's Witnesses' New World Translation of the Holy Scriptures renders the tetragrammaton as Jehovah throughout the Old Testament, and it uses the form Jehovah in the New Testament including — but not limited to — passages quoting the Old Testament even though it does not appear in the Greek text.

=== Single source translations ===
While most translations attempt to synthesize the various texts in the original languages, some translations also translate one specific textual source, generally for scholarly reasons. A single volume example for the Old Testament is The Dead Sea Scrolls Bible (ISBN 0-06-060064-0) by Martin Abegg, Peter Flint and Eugene Ulrich.

The Comprehensive New Testament (ISBN 978-0-9778737-1-5) by T. E. Clontz and J. Clontz presents a scholarly view of the New Testament text by conforming to the Nestle-Aland 27th edition and extensively annotating the translation to fully explain different textual sources and possible alternative translations.

A Comparative Psalter (ISBN 0-19-529760-1) edited by John Kohlenberger presents a comparative diglot translation of the Psalms of the Masoretic Text and the Septuagint, using the Revised Standard Version and the New English Translation of the Septuagint.

R. A. Knox's Translation of the Vulgate into English is another example of a single source translation.

=== Alternative approaches ===
Most translations make the translators' best attempt at a single rendering of the original, relying on footnotes where there might be alternative translations or textual variants. An alternative is taken by the Amplified Bible. In cases where a word or phrase admits of more than one meaning the Amplified Bible presents all the possible interpretations, allowing the reader to choose one. For example, the first two verses of the Amplified Bible read:

In the beginning God (Elohim) created [by forming from nothing] the heavens and the earth. The earth was formless and void or a waste and emptiness, and darkness was upon the face of the deep [primeval ocean that covered the unformed earth]. The Spirit of God was moving (hovering, brooding) over the face of the waters.

== Popularity in US ==
The Evangelical Christian Publishers Association release monthly and annual statistics regarding the popularity of different Bibles sold by their members in the United States. In 2023, the top 10 best-selling translations were the following:

1. New International Version
2. King James Version
3. English Standard Version
4. New Living Translation
5. Christian Standard Bible
6. New King James Version
7. Reina-Valera (Spanish)
8. New International Reader's Version
9. New American Standard Bible
10. New Revised Standard Version

Sales are affected by denomination and religious affiliation. For example, the most popular Jewish version would not compete with rankings of a larger audience. Sales data can be affected by the method of marketing. Some translations are directly marketed to particular denominations or local churches, and many Christian booksellers only offer Protestant Bibles, so books in other biblical canons (such as Catholic and Orthodox Bibles) may not appear as high on the CBA rank.

A study published in 2014 by The Center for the Study of Religion and American Culture at Indiana University and Purdue University found that Americans read versions of the Bible as follows:

1. King James Version (55%)
2. New International Version (19%)
3. New Revised Standard Version (7%)
4. New American Bible (6%)
5. The Living Bible (5%)
6. All other translations (8%)

== See also ==
- List of English Bible translations
