= Modern English Bible translations =

English Bible translations published since 1800

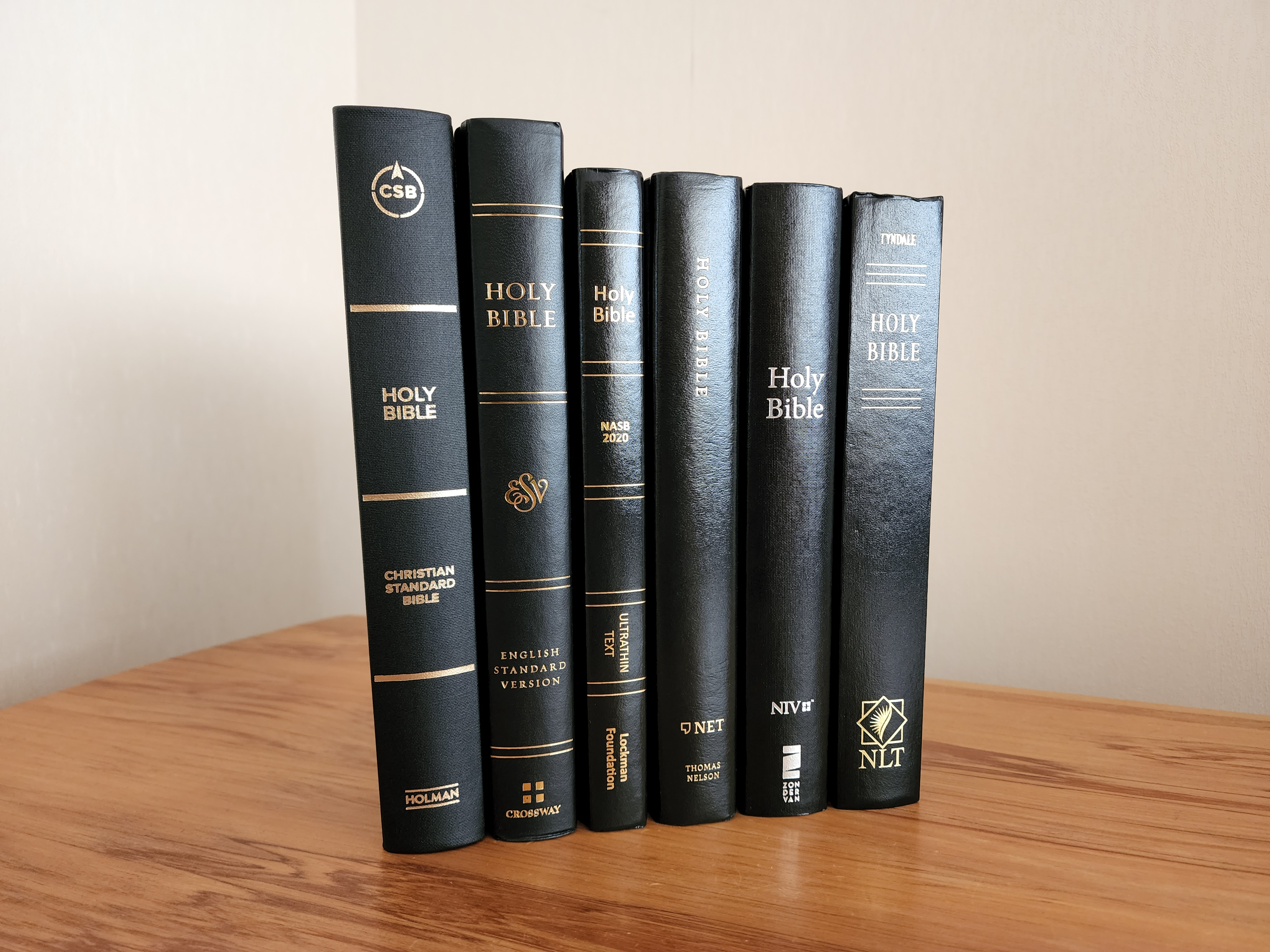
A selection of Bible translations in contemporary English

Modern English Bible translations consists of English Bible translations developed and published throughout the late modern period (c. 1800–1945) to the present (c. 1945–).

A multitude of recent attempts have been made to translate the Bible into English. Most modern translations published since c. 1900 are based on recently published critical editions of the original Hebrew and Greek texts. These translations typically rely on the Biblia Hebraica Stuttgartensia / Biblia Hebraica Quinta, counterparted by the Novum Testamentum Graece (and the Greek New Testament, published by the United Bible Societies, which contains the same text).

With regard to the use of Bible translations among biblical scholarship, the New Revised Standard Version is used broadly, but the English Standard Version is emerging as a primary text of choice among biblical scholars and theologians inclined toward theological conservatism. (Note: The ESV is available as an English Bible translation on the website of the Deutsche Bibelgesellschaft (German Bible Society), who publish the BHS/BHQ and Nestle–Aland critical text editions. Academic works published by Crossway typically feature the ESV translation as their primary (or sole) Bible text used for quotation. Various other evangelical publishers (such as Lexham Press, Ligonier Ministries, and Cruciform Press) frequently release Christian books that use the ESV text.)

== Development of Modern English Bible versions ==
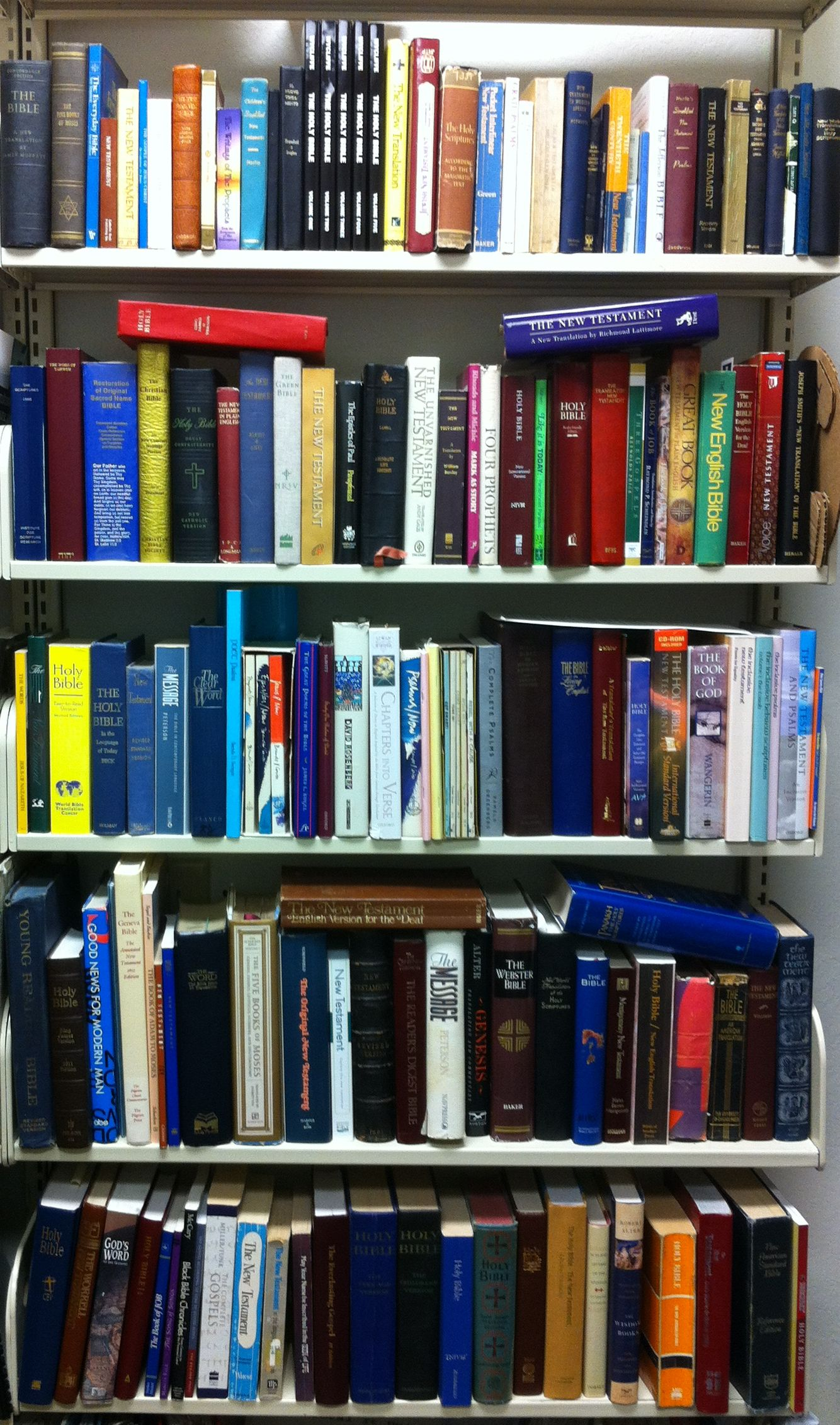
A bookshelf containing many English translations of the Bible

The Wessex Gospels were the first translation of the four Gospels in English without accompanying Latin text. The Authorized King James Version (KJV) of 1611 was sporadically altered until 1769, but was not thoroughly updated until the creation of the Revised Version (RV) in 1885 (its Americanized version, the American Standard Version (ASV), was published in 1901). However, it was not until the Revised Standard Version (RSV) was published (New Testament in 1946, full Bible in 1952) that a translation that rivaled the KJV in popularity was published. The RSV gained widespread adoption among the mainstream Protestant Churches in America and a Catholic Edition was released in 1966.

In the late twentieth century, Bibles increasingly appeared that were much less literal in their approach to translation. In 1946, the New English Bible was initiated in the United Kingdom, intended to enable readers to better understand the King James Bible. In 1958, J. B. Phillips (1906–1982) produced an edition of the New Testament letters in paraphrase, the Letters to Young Churches, so that members of his youth group could understand what the New Testament authors had written. In 1966, Good News for Modern Man, a non-literal translation of the New Testament, was released to wide acceptance. Others followed suit. The Living Bible, released in 1971, was published by its author Kenneth N. Taylor, based on the literal ASV of 1901. Taylor had begun because of the trouble his children had in understanding the literal (and sometimes archaic) text of the King James Bible. His work was at first intended for children, but was later positioned for marketing to high school and college students, as well as adults wishing to better understand the Bible. Like Phillips' version, the Living Bible was a dramatic departure from the King James Version.

Despite widespread criticism due to being a paraphrase rather than a translation, the popularity of The Living Bible created a demand for a new approach to translating the Bible into contemporary English called dynamic equivalence, which attempts to preserve the meaning of the original text in a readable way. Realizing the immense benefits of a Bible that was more easily accessible to the average reader, and responding to the criticisms of the Living Bible, the American Bible Society extended the Good News for Modern Man to the Good News Bible (1976) by adding the Old Testament, in this more readable style. This translation has gone on to become one of the best selling in history. In 1996, a new revision of Taylor's Living Bible was published. This New Living Translation is a full translation from the original languages rather than a paraphrase of the Bible.

Another project aimed to create something in between the very literal translation of the King James Bible and the more informal Good News Bible. The goal of this was to create a Bible that would be scholarly yet not overly formal. The result of this project was the New International Version (1978). This version became highly popular in Evangelical Protestant circles.

The debate between the formal equivalence and dynamic (or 'functional') equivalence translation styles has increased with the introduction of inclusive language versions. Various terms are employed to defend or attack this development, such as feminist, gender neutral, or gender accurate. New editions of some previous translations have been updated to take this change in language into account, including the New Jerusalem Bible (1985), the New Revised Standard Version (1989), the Revised English Bible (1989), and Today's New International Version (2005). Some translations have approached the issue more cautiously, such as the English Standard Version (2001).

A further process that has assisted in greatly increasing the number of English Bible versions is the use of the Internet in producing virtual bibles, of which a growing number are beginning to appear in print – especially given the development of "print on demand".

Today, there is a range of translations ranging from the most literal, such as the Young's Literal Translation to paraphrases such as The Message and The Word on the Street.

== 18th and 19th century translations ==
Name	Date
Challoner's revision of the Douay–Rheims Bible	1752
John Wesley, Wesley's New Testament	1755
Quaker Bible	1764
Benjamin Blayney, New Translations of Jeremiah, Lamentations and Zechariah	1784, 1797
Gilbert Wakefield, A Translation of the New Testament	1791
Thomson's Translation	1808
Alexander Campbell's The Living Oracles (New Testament)	1826
Webster's Revision	1833
Young's Literal Translation	1862
Julia E. Smith Parker Translation	1876
English Revised Version	1885
Darby Bible	1890

== 20th and 21st century translations ==
=== King James Version and derivatives ===
The King James Version of 1611 (in editions following the editing of Blayney at Oxford in 1769) still has an immense following, and as such there have been a number of different attempts to update or improve upon it. The English Revised Version and its derivatives also stem from the King James Version.

Abbreviation	Name	Date
Webster	Webster's Revision of the King James Version	1833
	(Johannes Lauritzen)	1920
CKJV	Children's King James Version Jay P. Green	1960
KJ II	King James II Version of the Bible Jay P. Green	1971
KJ3/LITV	King James 3 Version of the Holy Bible (by Jay P. Green)	1985
KJV20	King James Version—Twentieth Century Edition Jay P. Green	
NKJV	New King James Version	1982
KJ21	21st Century King James Version	1994
TMB	Third Millennium Bible	1998
MKJV	Modern King James Version by Jay P. Green	1999
KJV2000	King James Version 2000	2000
UKJV	Updated King James Version	2000
KJVER	King James Version Easy Reading	2001
HSE	Holy Scriptures in English	2001
CKJV	Comfort-able King James Version	2003
NCPB	New Cambridge Paragraph Bible	2005
AV7	AV7 (New Authorized Version)	2006
AVU	Authorized Version Update	2006
KJV-CE	King James Version—Corrected Edition	
DNKJB	Divine Name King James Bible	2011
MCT	Mickelson Clarified Translation, translated by Jonathan Mickelson	2008, 2013, 2015, 2019
MEV	Modern English Version	2014
	King James Bible for Catholics	2020
SKJV	Simplified King James Version	2022

=== English Revised Version and derivatives ===
The English Revised Version was the first official attempt to update the King James Version of 1769. This was adapted in the United States as the American Standard Version. The translations and versions that stem from them are shown in date order:

Abbreviation	Name	Date
RV/ERV	English Revised Version	1885
ASV	American Standard Version	1901
RSV	Revised Standard Version	1952, 1971
NASB	New American Standard Bible	1971, 1995, 2020
NRSV	New Revised Standard Version	1989, 2021
WEB	World English Bible	2000, 2020
ESV	English Standard Version	2001, 2025

=== New International Version and derivatives ===
The popular New International Version has appeared in a number of editions.

Abbreviation	Name	Date
NIV	New International Version	1978, 1984, 2011
NIrV	New International Reader's Version	1996, 1998, 2014
NIVI	New International Version Inclusive Language Edition (discontinued)	1996-2002
TNIV	Today's New International Version (discontinued)	2002-2011

=== Dynamic translations and paraphrases ===
A significant aspect in translations from the latter half of the 20th century was much greater use of the principles of dynamic equivalence.

Abbreviation	Name	Date
TLB	The Living Bible	1971
GNT/GNB/TEV	Good News Translation/Good News Bible/Today's English Version	1976, 1992
TCW	The Clear Word (paraphrase, non-official Seventh-day Adventist)	1994
CEV	Contemporary English Version	1995
GW	God's Word	1995
NLT	New Living Translation	1996, 2004, 2015
MSG	The Message	2002
RNT	Restored New Testament	2009
INT	Interpreted New Testament	2020

=== Internet-based translations ===
The New English Translation (or NET Bible) is a project to publish a translation of the Bible using the Internet. It is freely available and accompanied by extensive translator's notes. The Open English Bible aims to create the first modern public domain English translation of the Bible, using an open-source process for corrections and modernizing verses.

Abbreviation	Name	Date
NET	New English Translation	2005
OEB	Open English Bible	In progress.
LEB	Lexham English Bible	2011
WEB	World English Bible	2020
BSB	Berean Standard Bible	2022
MSB	Majority Standard Bible	2022
FBV	Free Bible Version	2023

=== Messianic translations ===
Some Bible translations find popular use in, or were prepared especially for, the Messianic Judaism movement.

Abbreviation	Name	Date
AENT	Roth, Andrew, Aramaic English New Testament	2008, 2009, 2010, 2011, 2012
TS	The Scriptures	1993, 1998, 2009
HRV	Hebraic Roots Version	2004
CJB	Stern, David H, Complete Jewish Bible	1998, 2017
CNT	Cassirer, Heinz, God's New Covenant: A New Testament Translation AKA Cassirer New Testament	1989
OJB	Goble, Phillip E, Orthodox Jewish Bible	2002
TLV	Tree of Life Bible	2014
MCT	MCT Brit Chadashah Interlinear, in English and Hebrew.	2019

=== New English Bible and derivatives ===
The initiative to create the New English Bible began in 1946, in an attempt to make an entirely new translation of the Bible in contemporary English.

Abbreviation	Name	Date
NEB	New English Bible	1970
REB	Revised English Bible	1989

=== Public domain translations ===
Abbreviation	Name	Date
OEB	Open English Bible	In progress
WEB	World English Bible	2020
BSB	Berean Standard Bible	2022
MSB	Majority Standard Bible	2022

=== Catholic translations ===
Abbreviation	Name	Date
WVSS	Westminster Version of the Sacred Scriptures	1913–1935 (Note: Released in parts between 1913–1935 with copious study and textual notes. The New Testament with condensed notes was released in 1936 as one volume.)
SPC	Spencer New Testament	1941
CCD	Confraternity Bible	1941 (Note: NT released in 1941. The OT contained material from the Challoner Revision until the entire OT was completed in 1969. This Old Testament went on to be the base for the 1970 NAB)
Knox	Knox Bible	1950
KLNT	Kleist-Lilly New Testament	1956 (Note: New Testament only; Gospels by James Kleist, rest by Joseph Lilly.)
JB	Jerusalem Bible	1966
RSV-CE	Revised Standard Version Catholic Edition	1965–66 (Note: Second Catholic Edition released 2006.)
NAB	New American Bible	1970
TLB-CE	The Catholic Living Bible	1971
GNT–CE	Good News Bible Catholic Edition (Note: Formerly known as the Today's English Version)	1979
NJB	New Jerusalem Bible	1985
CCB	Christian Community Bible	1988
NRSV-CE	New Revised Standard Version Catholic Edition	1989
GNT-CE	Good News Bible, Second Catholic Edition	1992
RSV-2CE	Revised Standard Version, Second Catholic Edition	2006
CTS	CTS New Catholic Bible	2007
NCB	New Community Bible	2008
NABRE	New American Bible Revised Edition	2011/1986
NLT-CE	New Living Translation Catholic Edition	2016
ESV-CE	English Standard Version Catholic Edition	2018
RNJB	Revised New Jerusalem Bible	2018-2019
NCB	New Catholic Bible - St. Joseph Edition	2019

In addition to the above Catholic English Bibles, all of which have an imprimatur granted by a Catholic bishop, the authors of the Catholic Public Domain Version of 2009 and the 2013 translation from the Septuagint by Jesuit priest Nicholas King refer to them as Catholic Bibles. These versions have not been granted an imprimatur, but do include the Catholic biblical canon of 73 books.

=== Sacred Name translations ===
These Sacred Name Bibles were all done with the specific aim of carrying into English the actual Name of God as they were in the originals. Most have been done by people from the Sacred Name Movement. They are distinguished by their policy of transliterating Hebrew-based forms for sacred names, such as "Yahweh", "YHWH", etc.

Abbreviation	Name	Date
SNB	Restoration of Original Sacred Name Bible	1976
HNB	Holy Name Bible	1963
SSBE	Sacred Scriptures Bethel Edition	1981
SN-KJ	Sacred Name King James Bible	2005
SSFOY	Sacred Scriptures, Family of Yah Edition	2000
TWOY	The Word of Yahweh	2003
TS	The Scriptures (ISR)	1993, 1998, 2009
HRV	Hebraic-Roots Version	2004
TBE	Transparent English Bible	In progress
NOG	Names of God Bible (Available in 2 editions, GW or KJV)	2011, 2014
MCT	Mickelson Clarified Translation	2008, 2013, 2015, 2019
LSV	Literal Standard Version	2020
HHBT	Hebrew Heritage Bible Translation	2012
	Book of Yahweh	

=== Masoretic Text / Jewish translations ===
Jewish translations follow the Masoretic Text, and are usually published in bilingual editions with the Hebrew text facing the English translation. The translations often reflect traditional Jewish exegesis of the Bible. As translations of the Masoretic Text, Jewish translations contain neither the apocrypha nor the Christian New Testament.

Abbreviation	Name	Date
JPS	Jewish Publication Society of America Version	1917
	Judaica Press	1963
	Koren Jerusalem Bible based on a translation by Harold Fisch	1962
	Kaplan, Aryeh, The Living Torah; Elman, Yaakov, The Living Nach	1981; 1996
NJPS	New Jewish Publication Society of America Version	1985
Artscroll	Stone Edition (Artscroll)	1996
	The Holy Scriptures, Hebrew Publishing Company, revised by Alexander Harkavy	1936,1951
MCT	Mickelson Clarified Interlinear of the Old Testament, in the Literary Reading Order; LivingSon Press	2015, 2019
TIB	The Israel Bible, Edited by Rabbi Tuly Weisz, Published by Israel 365	2018, 2021

=== Septuagint translations ===
Abbreviation	Name	Date
	Charles Thomson's The Holy Bible, Containing The Old And New Covenant, Commonly Called The Old And New Testament: Translated From The Greek	1808
	Brenton's English Translation of the Septuagint	1851
ABP	Apostolic Bible Polyglot	2003
AB	The Apostles' Bible	2007
OSB	Orthodox Study Bible	2007
NETS	New English Translation of the Septuagint	2007
DSPS	The Psalms of David: Translated from the Septuagint Greek	2010
LES	Lexham English Septuagint	2013
OCT	MCT Octuagint	2019
EOB	Eastern / Greek Orthodox Bible	In progress

=== Simplified English Bibles ===
There have been a number of attempts to produce a Bible that greatly simplifies the English. (Some of these versions are also listed in other categories: for example, the NIrV is also found under the NIV section). These are translations that are not necessarily a very dynamic translation, but go beyond simply everyday English into a restricted vocabulary set, often aimed at non-native speakers of English.

Abbreviation	Name	Date
BBE	Bible in Basic English	1949
BWE	Bible in Worldwide English [New Testament only] (Annie Cressman)	1969
NLV	New Life Version (Gleason Ledyard)	1986
SEB	Simple English Bible (Dr Stanley Morris)	1980
ERV	Easy-to-Read Version (previously English Version for the Deaf)	1989
NCV	New Century Version	1991
NIrV	New International Reader's Version	1998
MSG	The Message (Eugene H. Peterson)	2002
EASY	EasyEnglish Bible (MissionAssist)	2018

=== Translations exclusively published by Jehovah's Witnesses ===
Abbreviation	Name	Date
Diaglott	The Emphatic Diaglott (Benjamin Wilson)	1864, 1926
NWT	New World Translation of the Holy Scriptures	1950, 1951 (NT only), 1961, 1963, 1981, 1984, 2013
By	The Bible in Living English (Steven T. Byington)	1972

=== Translations exclusively published by the Latter Day Saints movement ===
Abbreviation	Name	Date
JST	Joseph Smith Translation of the Bible	1830

=== Adaptive retellings ===
Some versions have been labelled "adaptive retelling" as they take many liberties with the form of the text.

Abbreviation	Name	Date
	Black Bible Chronicles	1993, 1994
CPG	Cotton Patch Gospel by Clarence Jordan	1968–1973 (4 vols)
	The Aussie Bible; also More Aussie Bible by Kel Richards	2003
TPT	The Passion Translation	2017

=== Other translations ===
Abbreviation	Name	Date
ERB	Rotherham's Emphasized Bible	1902
Fenton	The Holy Bible In Modern English (by Ferrar Fenton)	1903
MNT	A New Translation (by James Moffatt)	1926
Lamsa	Lamsa Bible (by George Lamsa)	1933
AAT	An American Translation (by Smith and Goodspeed)	1935
	Anchor Bible Series	1957
BV	Berkeley Version (by Gerrit Verkuyl)	1958
AMP	Amplified Bible	1965
Knoch	Concordant Literal Version (by Adolph Ernst Knoch)	1966
MLB	The Modern Language Bible (New Berkeley Version)	1969
TSB	The Story Bible	1971
BECK	An American Translation (by William F. Beck)	1976
MLV	Modern Literal Version	1987
TMB	Third Millennium Bible	1998
RcV	Recovery Version (Living Stream Ministry)	1999
Purified	The Holy Bible: A Purified Translation (The New Testament)	2000
ABP	Apostolic Bible Polyglot	2003
HCSB	Holman Christian Standard Bible	2004
DTE	The Writ, Dabhar Translation (by Fritz Henning Baader)	2005
	The Literary Bible (by David Rosenberg) (Old Testament Only)	2009
CEB	Common English Bible	2011
CSB	Christian Standard Bible	2017
EHV	The Evangelical Heritage Version	2019

== Partial translations ==
=== New Testament ===
Abbreviation	Name	Date
Diaglott	Emphatic Diaglott by Benjamin Wilson	1864
	Jefferson Bible, or The Life and Morals of Jesus of Nazareth, by Thomas Jefferson	1895
	The Epistles of Paul in Modern English (includes Hebrews), by George Barker Stevens	1898
	The Twentieth Century New Testament	1902
	Weymouth New Testament (New Testament in Modern Speech)	1903
	Centenary New Testament (by Helen Barrett Montgomery)	1924
	The Four Gospels, by E. V. Rieu, Penguin	1952
	The Authentic New Testament, by Hugh J. Schonfield	1955
Phi / PME	The New Testament in Modern English and Four Prophets (by J. B. Phillips)	1958
	The Simplified New Testament, by Olaf M. Norlie	1961
WET	Wuest Expanded Translation (by Kenneth Wuest)	1961
	The New Testament: a New Translation, by William Barclay	1968
	TransLine, by Michael Magill	2002
	The Four Gospels, by Norman Marrow, ISBN 0-9505565-0-5	1977
	The Original New Testament, by Hugh J. Schonfield, ISBN 0-947752-20-X	1985
int-E	The Kingdom Interlinear Translation of the Greek Scriptures by The Watchtower Bible and Tract Society	1969,1985
	McCord's New Testament Translation of the Everlasting Gospel by Hugo McCord	1988
	A Fresh Parenthetical Version of the New Testament by B. E. Junkins ISBN 0-7618-2397-2	2002
	God's New Covenant: A New Testament Translation by Heinz Cassirer, ISBN 0-8028-3673-9	1989
Gaus	The Unvarnished New Testament by Andy Gaus	1991
Christian Bible	The Christian Bible: Its New Contract Writings Portion (Christian Bible Society, Mammoth Spring, AR)	1991
	The New Testament, by Richmond Lattimore, ISBN 0-460-87953-7	1996
TCE	The Common Edition New Testament	1999
COM	The Comprehensive New Testament	2008
ALT	Analytical-Literal Translation	1999?
	A New Accurate Translation of the Greek New Testament, by Julian G. Anderson ISBN 0-9602128-4-1	1984
	The Voice ISBN 1-4185-3439-0	2008
MLV	Modern Literal Version	2012
JNT	Jewish New Testament by David H. Stern	1989
	The Source New Testament With Extensive Notes on Greek Word Meaning, by Dr A. Nyland ISBN 0-9804430-0-8	2004
	The Last Days New Testament, Ray W. Johnson	1999
NTE	The Kingdom New Testament: A Contemporary Translation (U.K. title: The New Testament for Everyone), N T Wright	2011
	The Wilton Translation of the New Testament, Clyde C. Wilton	1999, 2010
	The Original Aramaic Bible in Plain English with Psalms & Proverbs, David Bauscher	2010
MEV	The New Testament, Modern Evangelical Version, by Robert Thomas Helm ISBN 1479774197	2013, 2016
	The New Testament: a Translation, by David Bentley Hart ISBN 0300186096	2017
	The New Testament: A Translation for Latter-day Saints, by Thomas Wayment ISBN 9781589587861	2018, 2022
	The New Testament: A Lawyer's Translation, by Malcolm Bishop KC (Troubador Publishing Ltd) ISBN 9781836287605	2024

=== Hebrew Bible ===
Name	Date
The Wisdom Books in Modern Speech (Job, Proverbs, Ecclesiastes, Lamentations, and Song of Songs), John Edgar McFadyen	1917
Four Prophets (Amos, Hosea, Micah, Isaiah), J.B. Phillips	1963
Job Speaks (Job), David Rosenberg	1977
The Book of J (Genesis, Exodus, Numbers, Deuteronomy), Harold Bloom and David Rosenberg	1990
A Poet's Bible (Psalms, Song of Solomon, Lamentations, Maccabees, Job, Ecclesiastes, Isaiah, Jeremiah, Zechariah, Jonah, Ruth, Esther, Judith, Daniel, Ezra, Nehemiah), David Rosenberg	1991
The Book of Job, Stephen Mitchell	1992
The Five Books of Moses, Everett Fox	1995
The Lost Book of Paradise: Adam and Eve in the Garden of Eden (Genesis and related apocrypha), David Rosenberg	1995
Genesis, Stephen Mitchell	1996
The Book of David (2 Samuel), David Rosenberg	1998
Give us a King! (1, 2 Samuel), Everett Fox	1999
The Dead Sea Scrolls Bible, Martin Abegg, Peter Flint, Eugene Ulrich	1999
The David Story (1, 2 Samuel), Robert Alter	2000
The Five Books of Moses, Robert Alter	2004
The Bible with Sources Revealed, Richard Elliott Friedman	2005
The Book of Psalms, Robert Alter	2007
The Wisdom Books, Robert Alter	2010
Ancient Israel (Joshua, Judges, Samuel, Kings), Robert Alter	2013
The Psalms Translated and Explained, Joseph Addison Alexander	1850
The Torah and Former Prophets, William Whitt	2018-2024 (in progress)

== Popularity of translations ==
ECPA Bible Translations Bestsellers, Best of 2023
Rank	Name	Abbreviation	Published (Note: That is, the first year of a full translation (irrespective of containing the Apocrypha) having been published.)
1	New International Version	NIV	1978
2	King James Version (Note: The King James Version was originally published prior to the late modern period.)	KJV	1611
3	English Standard Version	ESV	2001
4	New Living Translation	NLT	1996
5	Christian Standard Bible	CSB	2017
6	New King James Version	NKJV	1982
7	Reina-Valera (Note: The Reina-Valera is a Spanish translation.)	RVR	1602
8	New International Reader's Version	NIrV	1996
9	New American Standard Bible	NASB	1971
10	New Revised Standard Version	NRSV	1989

== See also ==
- Bible translations (for a general overview of translation into many languages)
- Bible errata
- List of English Bible translations
- Jewish English Bible translations
- Bible version debate
- List of Bible verses not included in modern translations
- List of major textual variants in the New Testament
- Bible translations into Scots
