= Jesus wept =

Verse in the Gospel of John describing Jesus's reaction to the death of Lazarus

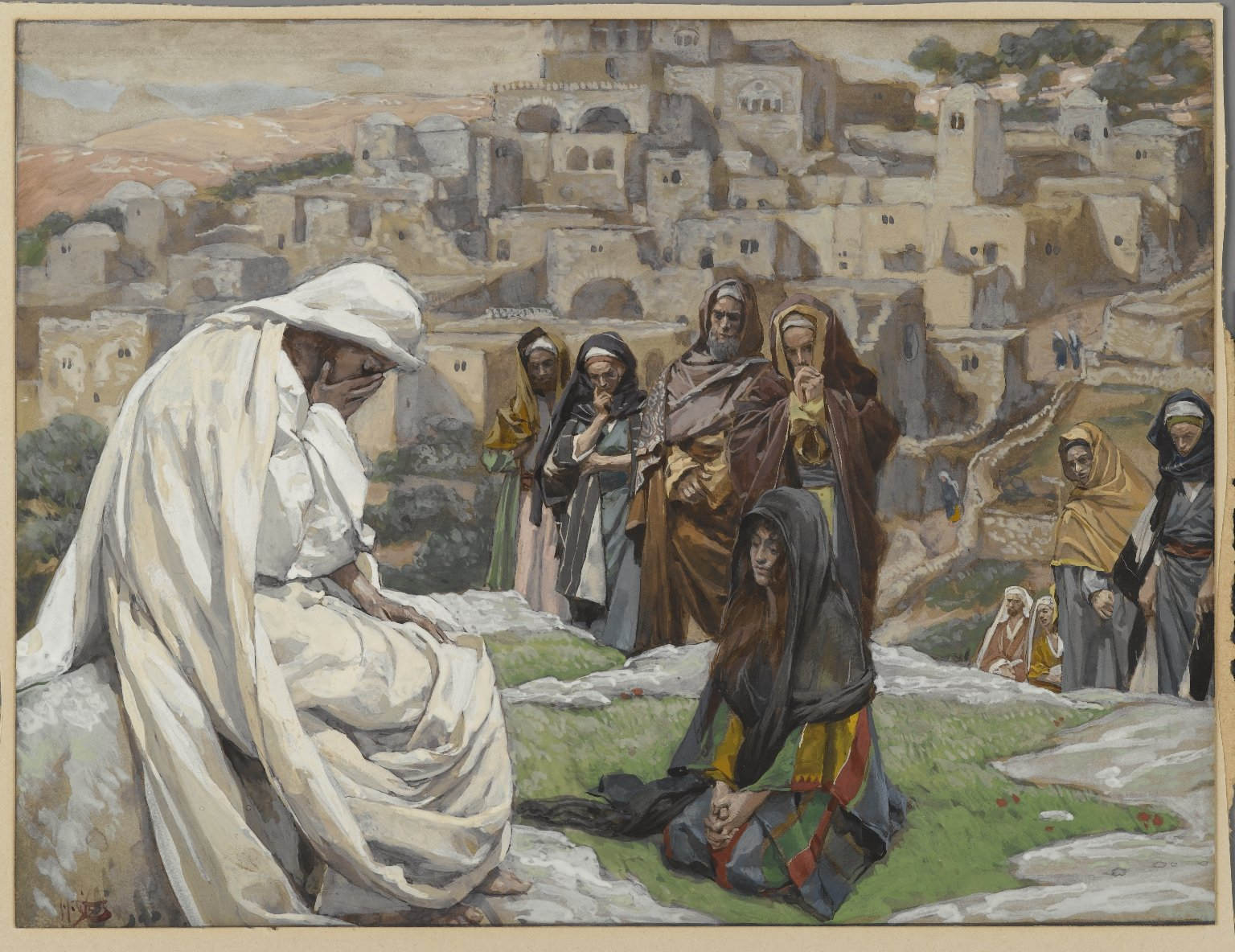
James Tissot, Jesus Wept (Jésus pleura)

"Jesus wept" (Koine Greek: ἐδάκρυσεν ὁ Ἰησοῦς, romanized: edákrusen ho Iēsoûs, pronounced [ɛˈdakrysɛn (h)o i.eˈsus]) is a phrase famous for being the shortest verse in the King James Version of the Bible, as well as in many other translations. It is not the shortest in the original languages. The phrase is found in the Gospel of John, chapter 11, verse 35. Verse breaks — or versification — were introduced into the Greek text by Robert Estienne in 1551 in order to make the texts easier to cite and compare.

== Context ==
This verse occurs in John's narrative of the death of Lazarus of Bethany, a follower of Jesus. Lazarus's sisters—Mary and Martha—sent word to Jesus of their brother's illness and impending death, but Jesus arrived four days after Lazarus died. Jesus, after talking to the grieving sisters and seeing Lazarus's friends weeping, was deeply troubled and moved. After asking where Lazarus had been laid and being invited to come see him, Jesus wept. He then went to the tomb and told the people to remove the stone covering it, prayed aloud to his Father, and ordered Lazarus to come out, resurrected.

The Gospel of Luke also records that Jesus wept as he entered Jerusalem before his trial and death, anticipating the destruction of the Temple.

== Text ==
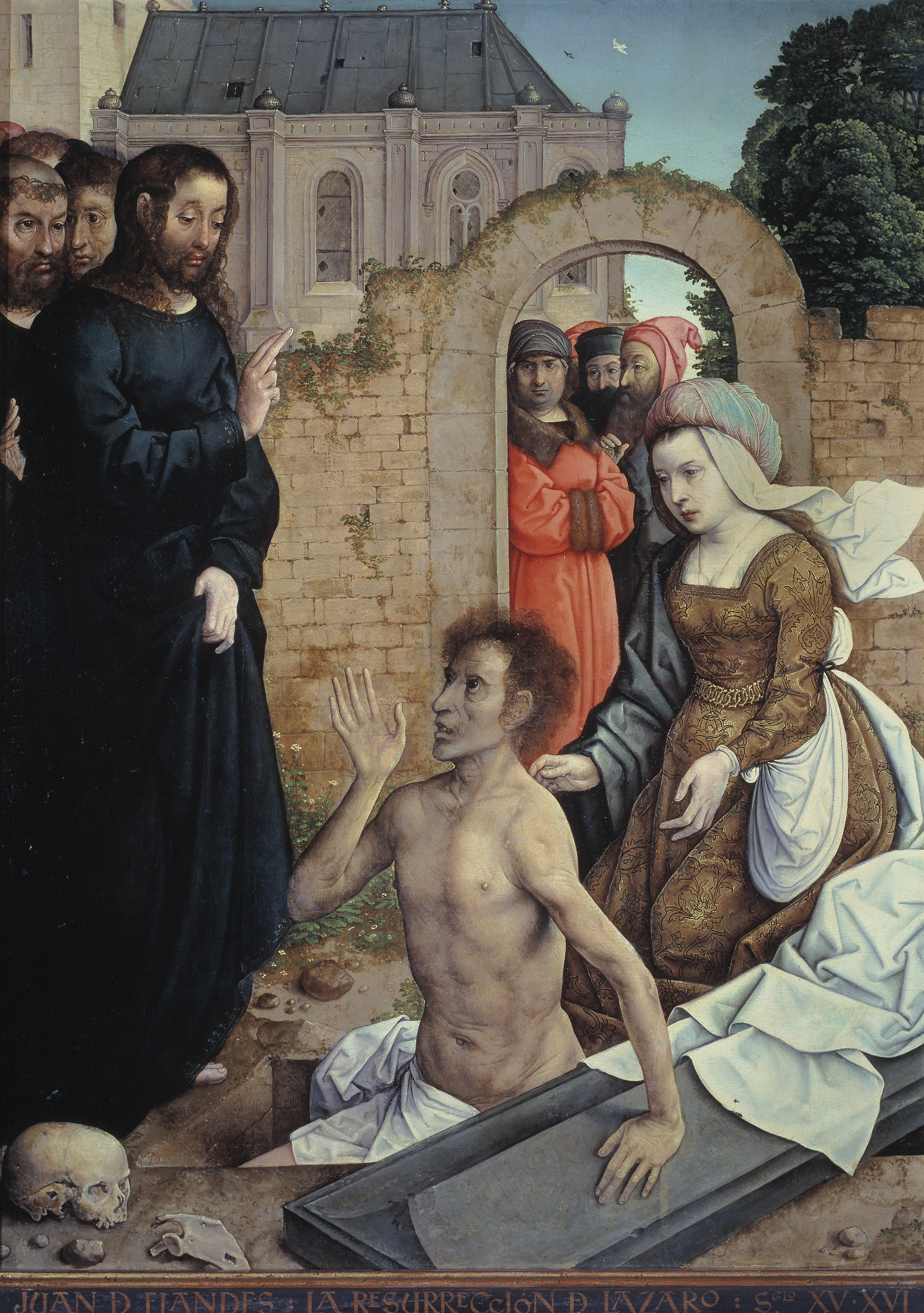
Resurrection of Lazarus by Juan de Flandes, around 1500

Translation	Text
Biblical Greek	ἐδάκρυσεν ὁ Ἰησοῦς. edákrusen ho Iēsoûs. "Jesus shed tears."
Peshitta	ܘܐܵܬ݂ܝܵܢ ܗ̄ܘܲܝ̈ ܕܸܡ̈ܥܵܘܗܝ ܕܝܼܫܘܿܥ. Wʾatiyan hway demʿawhy d-Yushwoʿ. "And the tears of Jesus came."
Vulgate	Et lacrimātus est Iēsus "And Jesus wept."
Luther Bible	Und Jesus gingen die Augen über. "And the eyes of Jesus overflowed [with tears]."
ASV, Darby Bible, ERV, ESV, HCSB, KJV, NASB, NET, NIV, NJB, NKJV, NLT (pre-2005 version), RSV, Recovery Version, WEB, YLT	"Jesus wept."
Bible in Basic English	"And Jesus himself was weeping."
God's Word	"Jesus cried."
The Message	"Now Jesus wept."
New American Bible, Douay–Rheims Bible	"And Jesus wept."
New Living Translation (2005 Version)	"Then Jesus wept."
New Revised Standard Version	"Jesus began to weep."
Complete Jewish Bible (CJB)	"Yeshua cried,"
The New World Translation of the Holy Scriptures	"Jesus gave way to tears."

== Interpretation ==
Significance has been attributed to Jesus's deep emotional response to his friends' weeping, and his own tears, including the following:

- Weeping demonstrates that Christ was a true man, with real bodily functions (such as tears, sweat, blood, eating and drinking—note, for comparison, the emphasis laid on Jesus's eating during the post-resurrection appearances). His emotions and reactions were genuine; Christ was not an illusion or spirit (see the heresy of Docetism). Pope Leo I referred to this passage when he discussed the two natures of Jesus: "In His humanity Jesus wept for Lazarus; in His divinity he raised him from the dead."
- The sorrow, sympathy, and compassion Jesus felt for all mankind.
- The rage he felt against the tyranny of death over mankind.

== In history ==
Jesus's tears have figured among the relics attributed to Jesus.

== Use as an expletive ==
In some parts of the English-speaking world, including Great Britain, Ireland (particularly Dublin and Belfast) and Australia, the phrase "Jesus wept" is an expletive some people use when something goes wrong or to express incredulity. In Christianity, this usage is considered blasphemous and offensive by the devout, as it is seen as violating the second or third of the Ten Commandments.

== See also ==
- Dominus Flevit Church
- Chapters and verses of the Bible § Statistics (including shortest verses)
