= Bible Black (disambiguation) =

Bible Black is a 2000 eroge video game franchise that includes several anime adaptations.

Bible Black may refer to:

- "Bible Black" (song), a song by Heaven & Hell
- Bible Black (band), a 1980s band
- Bible Black: Five Days with Andrew Mackenzie, a 2008 documentary by Tao Nørager

== See also ==
- Starless and Bible Black, an album by King Crimson
- Starless and Bible Black Sabbath, an album by The Acid Mothers Temple and the Cosmic Inferno
- Black Bible Chronicles, vernacular translation of the Bible
- The Black Bible, a compilation album
- Sixth and Seventh Books of Moses, a magical text also known as The Black Bible in Finland and Sweden
