= Modern Literal Version =

The Modern Literal Version (MLV) is a Modern English translation of the Old and New Testaments of the Bible, originally translated in 1987, and updated regularly since then.

== Translation approach ==
The Modern Literal Version translators' goal was to create an extremely literal and accurate translation of the Majority Greek Text while still using Modern English. The MLV claims to be at a 7th grade reading level, making it readable by most people.

The approach used in translation was to render the same Greek word into as few different English words as possible. The 1200 or so Greek compound words in the New Testament were rendered as if they had been split when possible. In 2012, a comparison chart was made showing Greek words and then showing how those words are translated in the Modern Literal Version, King James Version, New King James Version, New American Standard Bible, and English Standard Version.

The translators of the Modern Literal Version sought to be as literal as possible, and to keep any paraphrasing to a bare minimum. Any commentary that was deemed absolutely necessary was included in the "Appendix." The translators expressly stated "With any form of paraphrasing, someone's opinion becomes your Word of God!"

== History ==
Started originally in 1987 on two IBM clone 8086 and 80286 computers, this is one of the first computerized translations of the New Testament. Without the power of the computer to keep track of Greek and English word renderings, this mathematical like approach would have been almost impossible.

In 1998, the beta edition of the Modern Literal Version was placed online for readers to read. Some websites mistakenly state that it was first "published" on the internet in 2000. Unlike most modern translations, the MLV is (and has been) open for anyone who wants to suggest revisions in the wording used in this translation.

In 2012, a religious website offered a fully searchable online version of the Modern Literal Version.

In April 2012, the "Pre-Release" edition of the MLV was made available to the public.

The decision was made, at the beginning of 2013, to release annual updates to the MLV as needed in order to improve grammar or to improve any translation choices.

In recent years, the MLV has claimed to reach over 1 million proof readers, and claimed that many scholars are contributing to it,

== Popularity ==
In December 2011, the Modern Literal Version was made available in e-Sword format, and quickly became one of the top 100 downloads at BibleSupport.com, the officially recognized website for free third-party e-Sword resources.

Despite only being available since February 2012, the MySword edition of the MLV is already among the top five English Bible downloads among third-party modules.

The Word Bible Software version of the MLV is among the top 75 downloads at WordModules.com.

== See also ==
- Modern English Bible translations
