= Open English Bible =

Public domain bible translation to English

- Full name: Open English Bible
- Abbreviation: OEB
- OT published: WIP
- NT published: August 2010
- Derived from: NT: Twentieth Century New Testament; OT: Charles Foster Kent, John Edgar McFadyen, and the JPS 1917
- Textual basis: NT: Wescott-Hort; OT: Leningrad Codex
- Translation type: "scholarly defensible mainstream translation"
- Reading level: High School (Note: corresponding roughly to the NEB/REB or NRSV")
- Version revision: June 2016
- Publisher: Russell Allen
- Copyright: Public domain (CC0)
- Website: openenglishbible.org
- John 3:16 For God so loved the world, that he gave his only Son, that everyone who believes in him may not be lost, but have eternal life.

The Open English Bible (OEB) is a freely redistributable modern translation based on the Twentieth Century New Testament translation. A work in progress, with its first publication in August 2010, the OEB is edited and distributed by Russell Allen. It is licensed with a Creative Commons zero license, which allows free use of the content and allows forking of the content and a new translation to be made based on it. Its name and the distribution of all text and related software through GitHub reinforce the open source approach.

== History and textual basis ==
The OEB is a modern translation created by editing the Twentieth Century New Testament translation, and derived from the Greek Wescott-Hort text. The OEB aims to be a "scholarly defensible mainstream translation", which is intended "not to push any particular theological line". The reading level of the OEB "[corresponds] roughly to the NEB/REB or NRSV", that is, High School reading level. The OEB's initial release was in August 2010, although a preview of the Book of Mark was released in March 2010.

== Copyright status ==
The Open English Bible's copyright was held by Russell Allen, its author. It has been released into the public domain under a Creative Commons zero license with modified versions distributed under a different name. The OEB has been described as an "open source" translation.

The OEB is available online or using BibleWebApp.com software, or it can be downloaded in various formats.

== See also ==
- World English Bible – A public domain translation of the Bible, based on the Majority Text)
- New English Translation – An online translation
