= World English Bible =

Bible translation

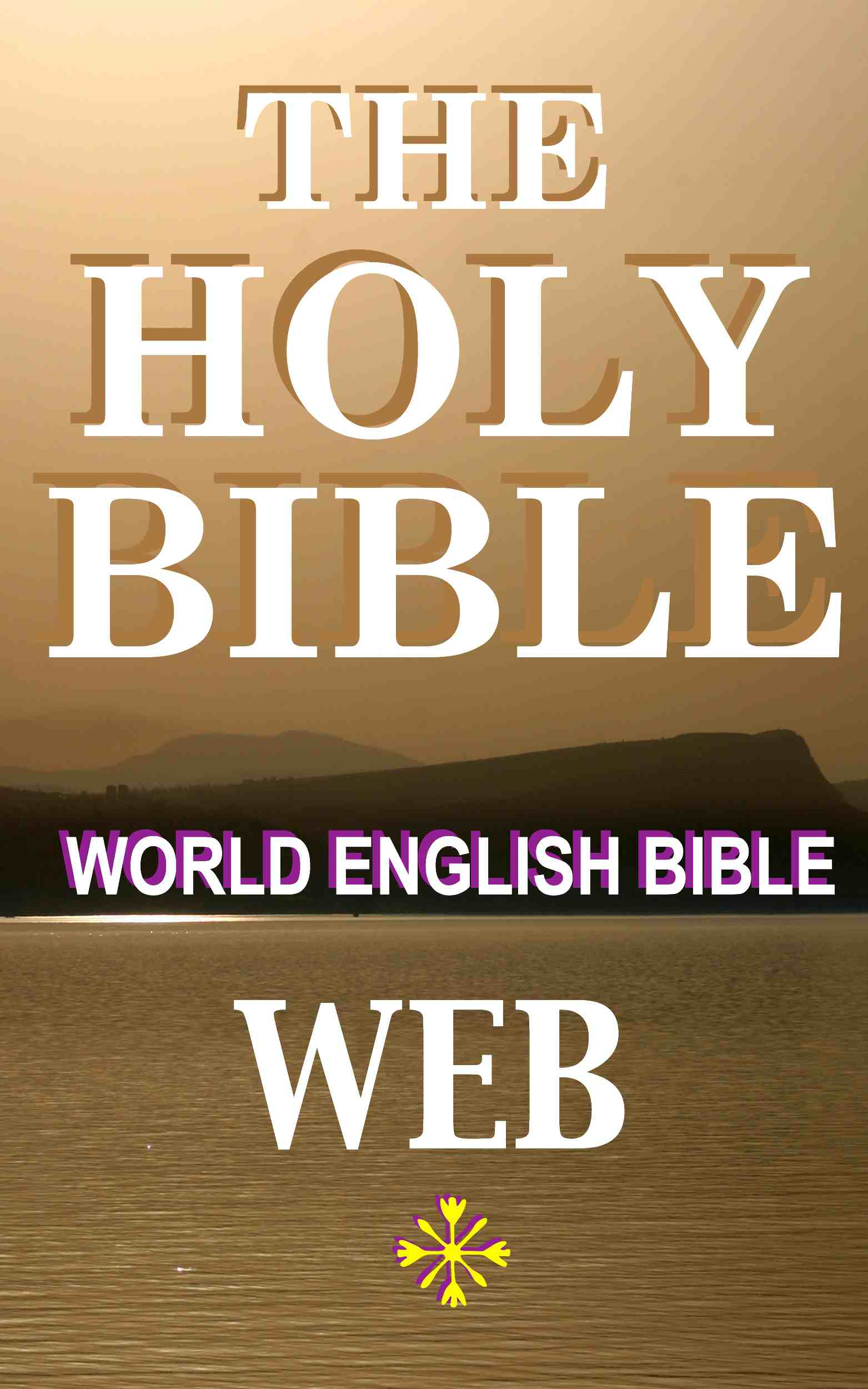
- Full name: World English Bible
- Abbreviation: WEB
- Complete Bible published: first draft in 1997, completed in 2020
- Authorship: Michael Paul Johnson (editor-in-chief and main translator)
- Derived from: American Standard Version 1901
- Textual basis: NT: Byzantine Majority Text by Robinson and Pierpont 1991. OT: Biblia Hebraica Stuttgartensia (with some Septuagint and Dead Sea Scrolls influence).
- Translation type: Formal equivalence
- Publisher: eBible.org
- Copyright: Public domain (copyright waived)
- Website: worldenglish.bible
- Genesis 1:1–3 In the beginning, God created the heavens and the earth. The earth was formless and empty. Darkness was on the surface of the deep and God's Spirit was hovering over the surface of the waters. God said, "Let there be light," and there was light. John 3:16 For God so loved the world, that he gave his only born Son, that whoever believes in him should not perish, but have eternal life.

The World English Bible (WEB) is an English translation of the Bible freely shared online. The translation work began in 1994 and was deemed complete in 2020. Created by Michael Paul Johnson with help from volunteers, the WEB is an updated revision of the American Standard Version from 1901.

The WEB has several versions available on its website, including both American and British styles of English. Another important distinction is two types of Old Testament: one limited to protocanon, while the other includes deuterocanon/apocrypha.

== History ==
In 1994, Michael Paul Johnson felt commissioned by God "to create a new modern English translation of the Holy Bible that would be forever free to use, publish, and distribute." As he did not have any formal training in this regard, he studied Greek and Hebrew, as well as how to use scholarly works. His first translated books were the gospel and letters of John. The drafts were shared on Usenet and a mailing list, where he received several suggestions from others and incorporated them. Estimating he would be 150 years old by the time this style of work would be finished, Johnson decided to base further work on the American Standard Version (ASV) of 1901, which is regarded as an accurate translation and is wholly in the public domain.

Johnson's main goal became modernizing the language of the ASV. He created custom computer programs to organize this process, resulting in the initial draft of 1997 which "was not quite modern English, in that it still lacked quotation marks and still had some word ordering that sounded more like Elizabethan English or maybe Yoda than modern English." This draft was soon named World English Bible (WEB), as Johnson intended it to be for any English speaker, while the acronym indicates that the Web is its means of distribution.

Over the years, numerous volunteers have assisted Johnson. The entire translation effort was deemed complete in 2020, but relatively minor changes are still made. Future substantial revisions will be forked to a separate World English Bible Update project.

== Features ==
The translation philosophy of the WEB is to be mostly formally equivalent, like the American Standard Version it is based on, but with modernized English. There are a modest amount of footnotes for cross-references and brief translation notes.

The WEB originally followed the ASV's decision to transliterate the Tetragrammaton, but used "Yahweh" instead of "Jehovah" throughout the Old Testament. However, this was relegated to the Classic version of the WEB; all other versions now use the word "LORD".

=== WEB and ASV comparison ===
Comparison of Bible passages in the WEB and the ASV, its source.
Genesis 1:1-5 (ASV)	Genesis 1:1-5 (WEB)
1 In the beginning God created the heavens and the earth. 2 And the earth was waste and void; and darkness was upon the face of the deep: and the Spirit of God moved upon the face of the waters. 3 And God said, Let there be light: and there was light. 4 And God saw the light, that it was good: and God divided the light from the darkness. 5 And God called the light Day, and the darkness he called Night. And there was evening and there was morning, one day.	1 In the beginning, God created the heavens and the earth. 2 The earth was formless and empty. Darkness was on the surface of the deep and God’s Spirit was hovering over the surface of the waters. 3 God said, “Let there be light,” and there was light. 4 God saw the light, and saw that it was good. God divided the light from the darkness. 5 God called the light “day”, and the darkness he called “night”. There was evening and there was morning, the first day.
Psalm 1:1-2 (ASV)	Psalm 1:1-2 (WEB)
1 Blessed is the man that walketh not in the counsel of the wicked, Nor standeth in the way of sinners, Nor sitteth in the seat of scoffers: 2 But his delight is in the law of Jehovah; And on his law doth he meditate day and night.	1 Blessed is the man who doesn’t walk in the counsel of the wicked, nor stand on the path of sinners, nor sit in the seat of scoffers; 2 but his delight is in Yahweh’s law. On his law he meditates day and night.
Matthew 1:1-2 (ASV)	Matthew 1:1-2 (WEB)
1 The book of the generation of Jesus Christ, the son of David, the son of Abraham. 2 Abraham begat Isaac; and Isaac begat Jacob; and Jacob begat Judah and his brethren;	1 The book of the genealogy of Jesus Christ, the son of David, the son of Abraham. 2 Abraham became the father of Isaac. Isaac became the father of Jacob. Jacob became the father of Judah and his brothers.
Romans 3:21-26 (ASV)	Romans 3:21-26 (WEB)
21 But now apart from the law a righteousness of God hath been manifested, being witnessed by the law and the prophets; 22 even the righteousness of God through faith in Jesus Christ unto all them that believe; for there is no distinction; 23 for all have sinned, and fall short of the glory of God; 24 being justified freely by his grace through the redemption that is in Christ Jesus: 25 whom God set forth to be a propitiation, through faith, in his blood, to show his righteousness because of the passing over of the sins done aforetime, in the forbearance of God; 26 for the showing, I say, of his righteousness at this present season: that he might himself be just, and the justifier of him that hath faith in Jesus.	21 But now apart from the law, a righteousness of God has been revealed, being testified by the law and the prophets; 22 even the righteousness of God through faith in Jesus Christ to all and on all those who believe. For there is no distinction, 23 for all have sinned, and fall short of the glory of God; 24 being justified freely by his grace through the redemption that is in Christ Jesus; 25 whom God sent to be an atoning sacrifice, through faith in his blood, for a demonstration of his righteousness through the passing over of prior sins, in God’s forbearance; 26 to demonstrate his righteousness at this present time; that he might himself be just, and the justifier of him who has faith in Jesus.
Revelation 13:11-12 (ASV)	Revelation 13:11-12 (WEB)
11 And I saw another beast coming up out of the earth; and he had two horns like unto a lamb, and he spake as a dragon. 12 And he exerciseth all the authority of the first beast in his sight. And he maketh the earth and them that dwell therein to worship the first beast, whose death-stroke was healed.	11 I saw another beast coming up out of the earth. He had two horns like a lamb, and he spoke like a dragon. 12 He exercises all the authority of the first beast in his presence. He makes the earth and those who dwell in it to worship the first beast, whose fatal wound was healed.

== Licensing ==
All of the text of the World English Bible is dedicated to the public domain. The ebible.org project maintains a trademark on the phrase "World English Bible" and requires any derivative work that alters the text in any way to not use the name "World English Bible" . The reasons given were that they felt copyright was an ineffective way of protecting the text's integrity and the fact that the Creative Commons licenses did not exist at the time the project began.

== Critical reception ==
The Provident Planning website uses the World English Bible because it is free of copyright restrictions and because the author considers it to be a good translation.

The Bible Megasite review of the World English Bible says it is a good revision of the American Standard Version of 1901 (ASV) into contemporary English, which also corrects some textual issues with the ASV.

The World English Bible is widely published in digital formats by a variety of publishers.

== See also ==
- New American Standard Bible
- Open English Bible – A primarily digitally published translation
- Modern Literal Version – A primarily digitally published translation
- New English Translation – A primarily digitally published translation
