= Holman Christian Standard Bible =

Modern English Bible translation

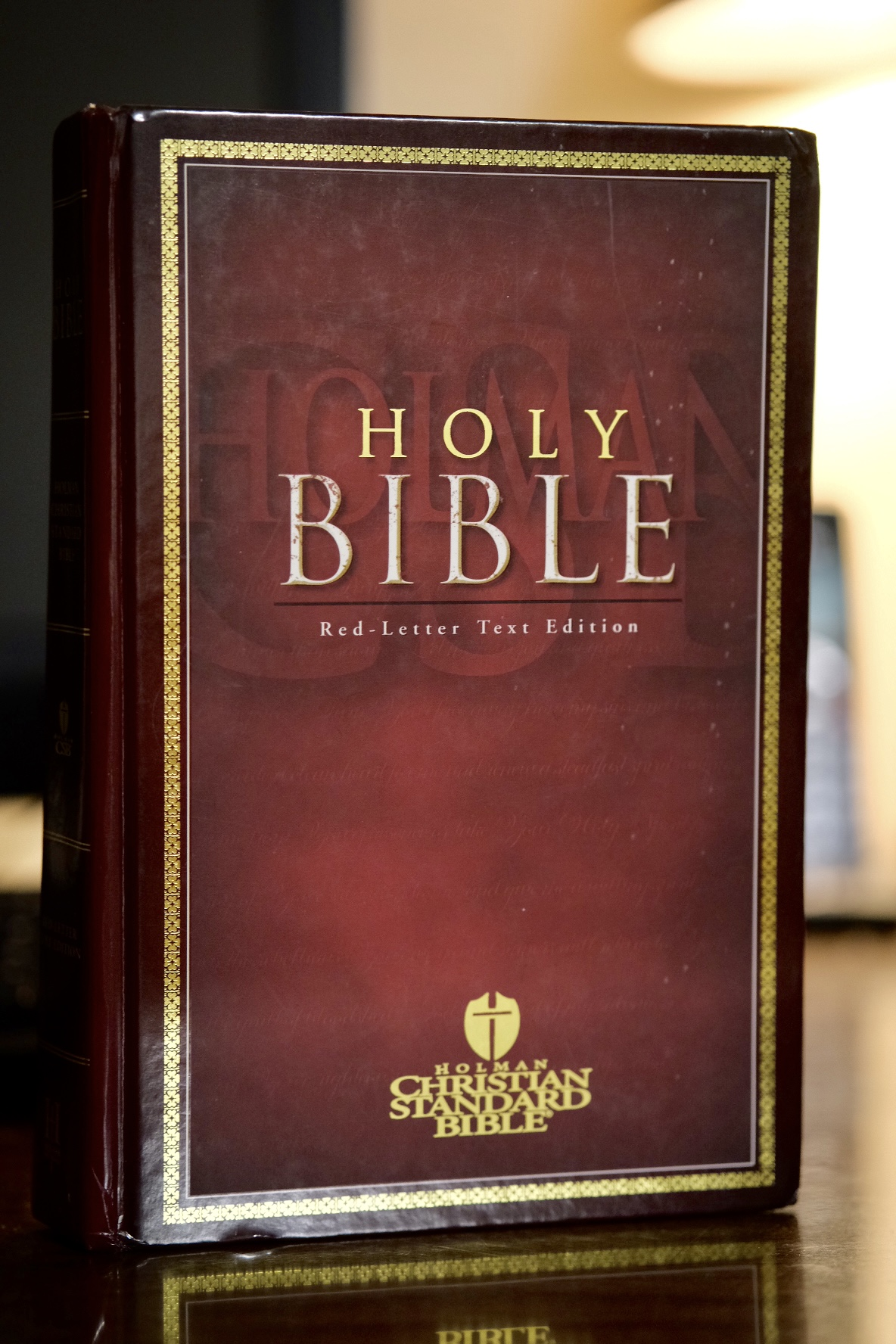
- Full name: Holman Christian Standard Bible
- Abbreviation: HCSB
- Complete Bible published: 2004
- Textual basis: NT: Novum Testamentum Graece 27th edition. OT: Biblia Hebraica Stuttgartensia with some Septuagint influence.
- Translation type: Mediating (Note: Called by the translators "optimal equivalence", the translation is a mediating translation in the stream of the NIV and similar, but slightly more literal.)
- Reading level: Middle School
- Version revision: 2009
- Copyright: Copyright 2004 Holman Bible Publishers
- Religious affiliation: Baptist
- Genesis 1:1–3 In the beginning God created the heavens and the earth. Now the earth was formless and empty, darkness covered the surface of the watery depths, and the Spirit of God was hovering over the surface of the waters. Then God said, "Let there be light," and there was light. John 3:16 For God loved the world in this way: He gave His One and Only Son, so that everyone who believes in Him might not perish but have eternal life.

The Holman Christian Standard Bible (HCSB) is a modern English Bible translation from Holman Bible Publishers. The New Testament was published in 1999, followed by the full Bible in March 2004.

== Beginnings ==
The roots of the HCSB can be traced to 1984, when Arthur Farstad, general editor of the New King James Version of the Bible, began a new translation project. In 1998, Farstad and LifeWay Christian Resources (the publishing arm of the Southern Baptist Convention) came to an agreement that would allow LifeWay to fund and publish the completed work. Farstad died soon after, and leadership of the editorial team was turned over to Dr. Edwin Blum, who had been an integral part of the team. The death of Farstad resulted in a change to the Koine Greek source text underlying the HCSB, although Farstad had envisioned basing the new translation on the same texts used for the King James Version and New King James Version. He followed the Greek Majority Text which he and Zane C. Hodges had authored. After Farstad's death, the editorial team replaced this text with the consensus Greek New Testament established by twentieth-century scholars.

Holman Bible Publishers assembled an international, interdenominational team of 100 scholars and proofreaders, all of whom were committed to biblical inerrancy.

== Formats ==
The HCSB is available in electronic form for WORDsearch and Bible Explorer software. An HCSB Study Bible became available in October 2010. The HCSB is available online. It has a version specifically for the Microsoft Xbox 360 called Bible Navigator X.

== Updates ==
The 2nd edition HCSB appeared in 2010. The most significant change was the expanded use of the covenant name of God, known as the tetragrammaton, rendered as "Yahweh," rather than the traditional English "LORD." In the first edition Yahweh was found in 78 places; the update increased that to 495 instances (the tetragrammaton appears in over 6,800 places in the Old Testament).

In June 2016 B&H Publishing announced a revision of the translation called the Christian Standard Bible (CSB).

=== Comparison of Psalm 83:18 ===
HCSB:

May they know that You alone—
whose name is Yahweh—
are the Most High over all the earth.

CSB:

May they know that you alone—
whose name is the LORD
are the Most High over the whole earth.

=== Comparison of 1 Corinthians 6:7-10 ===
| KJV 1611 | RSV 1952 | HCSB 2004 |
| 7 Now therefore there is utterly a fault among you, because ye go to law one with another. | 7 To have lawsuits at all with one another is defeat for you. | 7 Therefore, to have legal disputes against one another is already a moral failure for you. |
| Why do ye not rather take wrong? | Why not rather suffer wrong? | Why not rather put up with injustice? |
| Why do ye not rather suffer yourselves to be defrauded? | Why not rather be defrauded? | Why not rather be cheated? |
| 8 Nay, ye do wrong, and defraud, and that your brethren. | 8 But you yourselves wrong and defraud, and that even your own brethren. | 8 Instead, you act unjustly and cheat—and you do this to believers! |
| 9 Know ye not that the unrighteous shall not inherit the kingdom of God? | 9 Do you not know that the unrighteous will not inherit the kingdom of God? | 9 Don’t you know that the unrighteous will not inherit God’s kingdom? |
| Be not deceived: neither fornicators, nor idolaters, nor adulterers, nor effeminate, nor abusers of themselves with mankind, | Do not be deceived; neither the immoral, nor idolaters, nor adulterers, nor sexual perverts, | Do not be deceived: No sexually immoral people, idolaters, adulterers, or anyone practicing homosexuality [note: Lit adulterers, passive homosexual partners, active homosexual partners], |
| 10: nor thieves, nor covetous, nor drunkards, nor revilers, nor extortioners, shall inherit the kingdom of God. | 10: nor thieves, nor the greedy, nor drunkards, nor revilers, nor robbers; will inherit the kingdom of God. | 10: no thieves, greedy people, drunkards, verbally abusive people, or swindlers; will inherit God’s kingdom. |
| 11 And such were some of you: | 11 And such were some of you. | 11 And some of you used to be like this. |
| but ye are washed, but ye are sanctified, but ye are justified in the name of the Lord Jesus, and by the Spirit of our God. | But you were washed, you were sanctified, you were justified in the name of the Lord Jesus Christ and in the Spirit of our God. | But you were washed, you were sanctified, you were justified in the name of the Lord Jesus Christ and by the Spirit of our God. |
