= Black Bible Chronicles =

Black Bible Chronicles is a two-volume set of "adaptive retelling" of the Bible by P. K. McCary. Black Bible Chronicles: From Genesis to the Promised Land is a 190-page "interpretation" of the Pentateuch. Book 2, titled Rappin' With Jesus: The Good News According to the Four Brothers, was released a year later on January 1, 1993, and includes similarly interpreted versions of the four gospels in 168 pages. There has been no announcement concerning further releases in the series for the remainder of the Biblical books.

It is far more free in its structure than a dynamic equivalence translation. In terms of style, it is more free than Clarence Jordan's Cotton Patch version or The Aussie Bible.

The Black Bible Chronicles books were all written by P.K. McCary as a way to bring the "message of life into the language of the streets". The original Biblical passages are summarized; the rhythm of the original verses is maintained, but the vocabulary and phrasing uses African American Vernacular English (AAVE or Ebonics). Excerpts can be read in some of the external links from this article.

== See also ==
- Miscellaneous Bible translations
