= New International Reader's Version =

English translation of the Bible

- Abbreviation: NIrV
- NT published: 1994
- Complete Bible published: 1996 (Note: The Old Testament had been completed by the end of 1995.)
- Derived from: New International Version
- Textual basis: OT: Biblia Hebraica Stuttgartensia (5th ed., 1997); additional sources; NT: UBS Greek New Testament (4th corrected ed.); Novum Testamentum Graece (27th ed., 1993)
- Translation type: Dynamic equivalence
- Reading level: Third grade
- Version revision: 1998, 2014
- Publisher: Biblica
- Copyright: The Holy Bible, New International Reader's Version® Copyright © 1995, 1996, 1998, 2014 by Biblica, Inc.® All rights reserved.
- Religious affiliation: Evangelical
- Webpage: www.thenivbible.com/nirv/
- Genesis 1:1–3 In the beginning, God created the heavens and the earth. The earth didn't have any shape. And it was empty. There was darkness over the surface of the waves. At that time, the Spirit of God was hovering over the waters. God said, "Let there be light." And there was light. John 3:16 God so loved the world that he gave his one and only Son. Anyone who believes in him will not die but will have eternal life.

The New International Reader's Version (NIrV) is a translation of the Bible in contemporary English. Translated by the International Bible Society (now Biblica) following a similar philosophy as the New International Version (NIV), but written in a simpler form of English, this version seeks to make the Bible more accessible for children and people who have difficulty reading English, such as non-native English speakers. The authors describe it as a special edition of the NIV written at a third grade reading level.

Zondervan and HarperCollins published a children's version of this text in 2011, targeted at four to seven year olds and featuring the characters of the Berenstain Bears.

According to the Evangelical Christian Publishers Association (ECPA), the NIrV is the eighth on the list of best-selling English Bible translations.

== Translation history ==
The NIrV is based on the text of the NIV. Wherever possible, the NIrV uses the text of the NIV but adapts it for reading at a third-grade level (roughly ages 8-9).

In August 1991, Zondervan Publishing House wrote guidelines for developing a simplified version of the Bible to be based on the NIV Bible. The work on what would become the NIrV began in March 1992 in Colorado Springs, with the work being co-sponsored by the International Bible Society and Zondervan Publishing House. Many of those who translated the NIV were also involved in the creation of the NIrV. In addition, there were many other literary experts and educators who specialized in education among children. This was to ensure the best possible product became available for the target audience.

Throughout the process, the NIV guidelines were utilised to maintain accuracy, clarity and readability. Furthermore, the original Greek, Hebrew, and Aramaic Biblical texts were consulted. The process was completed after a final review committee approved the work.

In total, almost 40 people from 14 denominations worked together to create the NIrV.

In March 1994, the New Testament was completed, with reviews and proofing beginning. The name, the New International Reader's Version (NIrV) was announced by the International Bible Society in August of that year. By the end of 1995, the Old Testament was also completed, and the full Bible was first published in the autumn of 1996.

== Example text ==
Here is a comparison of a passage from the First Letter to Timothy in the New King James Version, the New International Version, and the New International Reader's Version:

NKJV
"And without controversy great is the mystery of godliness: God was manifested in the flesh, Justified in the Spirit, Seen by angels, Preached among the Gentiles, Believed on in the world, Received up in glory." (1 Timothy 3:16, NKJV)

NIV
"Beyond all question, the mystery from which true godliness springs is great: He appeared in the flesh, was vindicated by the Spirit, was seen by angels, was preached among the nations, was believed on in the world, was taken up in glory." (1 Timothy 3:16, NIV)

NIrV
"There is no doubt that true godliness comes from this great mystery. Jesus came as a human being. The Holy Spirit proved that he was the Son of God. He was seen by angels. He was preached among the nations. People in the world believed in him. He was taken up to heaven in glory." (1 Timothy 3:16, NIrV)

== See also ==
- New International Version
- Modern English Bible translations
