= Christian Standard Bible =

English translation of the Bible

- CSB Pew Bible (Hardcover, Black)
- Abbreviation: CSB
- Complete Bible published: 2017
- Derived from: Holman Christian Standard Bible (2nd ed., 2009)
- Textual basis: OT: Biblia Hebraica Stuttgartensia; NT: Novum Testamentum Graece (28th ed., 2012); UBS Greek New Testament (5th corrected ed.)
- Translation type: Dynamic and formal
- Reading level: 7.0
- Revision: 2020
- Publisher: Holman Bible Publishers
- Copyright: Christian Standard Bible® Copyright © 2017 by Holman Bible Publishers.
- Religious affiliation: Lifeway (Note: That is, Southern Baptist.)
- Website: csbible.com
- Genesis 1:1–3 In the beginning God created the heavens and the earth. Now the earth was formless and empty, darkness covered the surface of the watery depths, and the Spirit of God was hovering over the surface of the waters. Then God said, "Let there be light," and there was light. John 3:16 For God loved the world in this way: He gave his one and only son, so that everyone who believes in him will not perish but have eternal life.

The Christian Standard Bible (CSB) is a translation of the Bible in contemporary English. Published by Holman Bible Publishers in 2017 as the successor to the Holman Christian Standard Bible (HCSB), the CSB "incorporates advances in biblical scholarship and input from Bible scholars, pastors, and readers to sharpen both accuracy and readability." The CSB relies on recently published critical editions of the original Hebrew, Aramaic, and Greek texts.

Work on the CSB was completed in June 2016, with the first full edition released in March 2017.

== History ==
The Christian Standard Bible is a major revision of the 2009 edition of the Holman Christian Standard Bible (HCSB). The CSB incorporates advances in biblical scholarship to improve upon translation decisions, word choice, and style. It also drops some of the unusual features of the HCSB, consistently translating the tetragrammaton as "Lord" rather than "Yahweh," and using "brothers and sisters" where implied rather than "brothers".

The HCSB was translated by an international team of 100 scholars from 17 denominations. The HCSB New Testament was released in 1999, and the entire translation was released in 2004.

Work on the CSB revision was undertaken by the Translation and Review Team, a trans-denominational group of 21 conservative Evangelical Christian biblical scholars. Backgrounds represented include Southern Baptist, Lutheran, Presbyterian, conservative Anglican, and non-denominational Evangelical churches.

Ongoing translation decisions are governed by the ten member CSB Translation Oversight Committee, co-chaired by Thomas R. Schreiner and David L. Allen.

In February 2020, an update to the translation (CSB Text Edition: 2020) was released. Adjustments affected less than 1% of the 2017 text, and focused on edits to footnotes, cross references, punctuation, and word/phrase choices. The Translation Oversight Committee provided specific explanation about their decision to translate hilasterion in Romans 3:25 as "mercy seat" rather than the 2017 rendering of "atoning sacrifice" or the traditional rendering in English Bibles, "propitiation."

The CSB translation is now the second best-selling English translation of the Bible, according to the Evangelical Christian Publishers Association (ECPA).

== Translation philosophy ==
The CSB (and original HCSB) translators used a methodology that they termed "Optimal Equivalence." It draws from both dynamic and formal equivalence translation philosophies and balances contemporary English readability with linguistic precision to the original languages.

Based upon criteria from a quantitative linguistic comparison of eight popular English Bible translations, the CSB was found, according to Andi Wu of the Global Bible Initiative, to hold the most optimal balance of Readable vs. Literal scores.

== Textual basis ==
The CSB Translation and Review Team used the latest available Greek, Hebrew, and Aramaic texts. The Biblia Hebraica Stuttgartensia 4th Edition (BHS) was used for the Old Testament and the Novum Testamentum Graece 28th Edition (NA28; i.e., the Nestle-Aland 28th edition) and United Bible Societies 5th Edition (UBS5) was used for the New Testament (the HCSB also used BHS but used NA27/UBS4).

== Comparisons ==
=== 1 Corinthians 6:7-10 ===
KJV 1611	RSV 1952	HCSB 2004	CSB 2017
7 Now therefore there is utterly a fault among you, because ye go to law one with another.	7 To have lawsuits at all with one another is defeat for you.	7 Therefore, to have legal disputes against one another is already a moral failure for you.	7 As it is, to have legal disputes against one another is already a defeat for you.
Why do ye not rather take wrong?	Why not rather suffer wrong?	Why not rather put up with injustice?	Why not rather be wronged?
Why do ye not rather suffer yourselves to be defrauded?	Why not rather be defrauded?	Why not rather be cheated?	Why not rather be cheated?
8 Nay, ye do wrong, and defraud, and that your brethren.	8 But you yourselves wrong and defraud, and that even your own brethren.	8 Instead, you act unjustly and cheat—and you do this to believers!	8 Instead, you yourselves do wrong and cheat—and you do this to brothers and sisters!
9 Know ye not that the unrighteous shall not inherit the kingdom of God?	9 Do you not know that the unrighteous will not inherit the kingdom of God?	9 Don’t you know that the unrighteous will not inherit God’s kingdom?	9 Don’t you know that the unrighteous will not inherit God’s kingdom?
Be not deceived: neither fornicators, nor idolaters, nor adulterers, nor effeminate, nor abusers of themselves with mankind,	Do not be deceived; neither the immoral, nor idolaters, nor adulterers, nor sexual perverts,	Do not be deceived: No sexually immoral people, idolaters, adulterers, or anyone practicing homosexuality [note: Lit adulterers, passive homosexual partners, active homosexual partners],	Do not be deceived: No sexually immoral people, idolaters, adulterers, or males who have sex with males [note: Both passive and active participants in homosexual acts],
10 nor thieves, nor covetous, nor drunkards, nor revilers, nor extortioners, shall inherit the kingdom of God.	10 nor thieves, nor the greedy, nor drunkards, nor revilers, nor robbers; will inherit the kingdom of God.	10 no thieves, greedy people, drunkards, verbally abusive people, or swindlers; will inherit God’s kingdom.	10 no thieves, greedy people, drunkards, verbally abusive people, or swindlers; will inherit God’s kingdom.
11 And such were some of you:	11 And such were some of you.	11 And some of you used to be like this.	11 And some of you used to be like this.
but ye are washed, but ye are sanctified, but ye are justified in the name of the Lord Jesus, and by the Spirit of our God.	But you were washed, you were sanctified, you were justified in the name of the Lord Jesus Christ and in the Spirit of our God.	But you were washed, you were sanctified, you were justified in the name of the Lord Jesus Christ and by the Spirit of our God.	But you were washed, you were sanctified, you were justified in the name of the Lord Jesus Christ and by the Spirit of our God.

=== Micah 6:8 ===
Most versions use "love mercy" or "love kindness" (which means showing mercy or kindness to other people, especially those in need), whereas the CSB uses "love faithfulness" (but doesn't state who to be faithful to - is it to God, or to church, or to other people?). The Hebrew word is Chesed (Hebrew: חֶסֶד, Romanized: Ḥeseḏ) which means: kindness, charity, favor, goodness, or benevolence. This would relate to the important Jewish principle of Tzedakah. (Interlinear websites such as BlueLetterBible or BibleHub show this Hebrew-to-English translation).

KJV	RSV	NIV 2011	HCSB 2004	CSB 2017
8 He hath shewed thee, O man, what is good; and what doth the Lord require of thee, but to do justly, and to love mercy, and to walk humbly with thy God?	8 He has showed you, O man, what is good; and what does the Lord require of you but to do justice, and to love kindness, and to walk humbly with your God?	8 He has shown you, O mortal, what is good. And what does the Lord require of you? To act justly and to love mercy and to walk humbly with your God.	8 Mankind, He has told you what is good and what it is the Lord requires of you: to act justly, to love faithfulness, and to walk humbly with your God.	8 Mankind, he has told each of you what is good and what it is the Lord requires of you: to act justly, to love faithfulness, and to walk humbly with your God.

== See also ==
- Modern English Bible translations
