= Bible in Basic English =

Basic English translation of the Bible

- Full name: Bible in Basic English
- Abbreviation: BBE
- NT published: 1941
- Authorship: S. H. Hooke (ed.)
- Textual basis: Hebrew / Greek
- Version revision: 1965
- Publisher: Cambridge University Press
- Webpage: www.o-bible.com/bbe.html
- Genesis 1:1–3 At the first God made the heaven and the earth. And the earth was waste and without form; and it was dark on the face of the deep: and the Spirit of God was moving on the face of the waters. And God said, Let there be light: and there was light. John 3:16 For God had such love for the world that he gave his only Son, so that whoever has faith in him may not come to destruction but have eternal life.

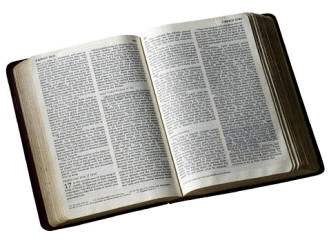
The Bible

The Bible In Basic English (also known as the BBE) is a translation of the Bible into Basic English. The BBE was translated by Professor S. H. Hooke using the standard 850 Basic English words. 100 words that were helpful to understand poetry were added along with 50 "Bible" words for a total of 1,000 words. This version is effective in communicating the Bible to those with limited education or where English is a second language. The New Testament was released in 1941 and the Old Testament was released in 1949.

The 1965 printing of the Bible was published by Cambridge Press in England without any copyright notice and distributed in the US, falling into the Public Domain according to the UCC convention of that time.

== See also ==
- Bible in Worldwide English
- New International Reader's Version, a simplified English version of the New International Version
