= King James Bible for Catholics =

Catholic revision of the King James Bible

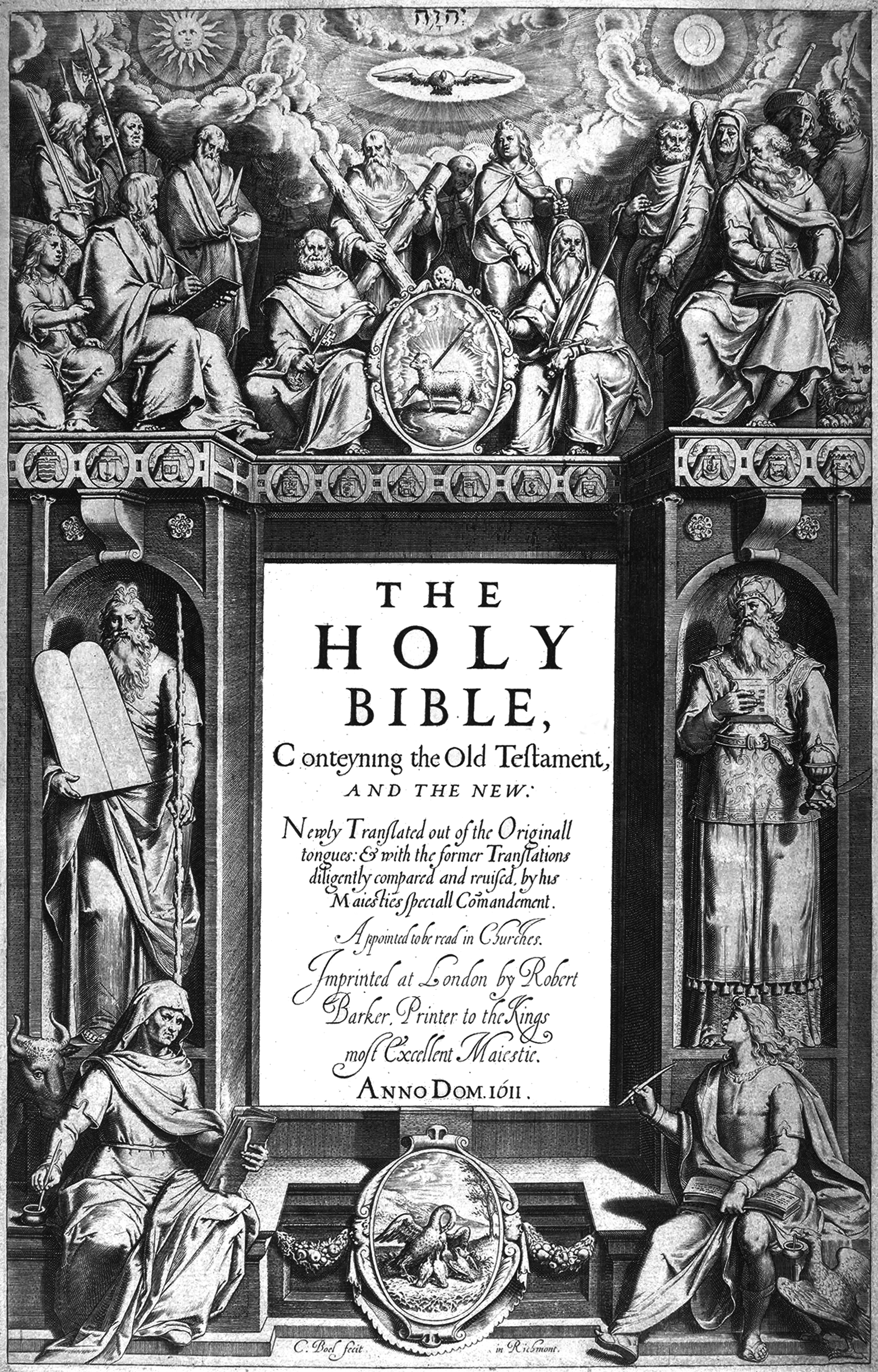
An image inside the front cover of the 1611 edition of the King James Bible

The King James Bible for Catholics is a near replica of the 1611 edition of the King James Bible (Authorized Version) which has been updated to reflect the order of books and text found in the Catholic Bible. The work was published by John Covert, a layman in the Personal Ordinariate of the Chair of St. Peter, on the Feast of St. Theodore of Canterbury (September 19) in 2020. Covert’s goal was to bring more of the vernacular traditions of the Anglican Patrimony into the Catholic Church and reflects a revival in English Catholicism.

== Changes made from the 1611 edition ==
The goal of the King James Bible for Catholics is to maintain as much of the original 1611 edition as possible while reformatting the text as necessary to bring it into consensus with typical Catholic Bible translations. The deuterocanonical books have been reorganized in their traditional Catholic sequence as opposed to their place in the Apocrypha, between the Old Testament and New Testament, in the 1611 edition. Additionally, deuterocanonical additions of Daniel and Esther, which, in addition to the other deuterocanonical books, are accepted as canonical in the Catholic Church, have been returned to their respective books with out-of-sequence chapter and numbering schemes that reflect their placement by St. Jerome in the Latin Vulgate Bible.
