= The Israel Bible =

- Language: English and Hebrew, parallel text
- Published: New Milford, Connecticut and Jerusalem, Israel
- Publisher: Menorah Books
- English publication date: June 2018
- ISBN: 978-1-940516-80-6
- Website: theisraelbible.com

The Israel Bible is a bilingual English-Hebrew version of the Hebrew Bible, edited by Rabbi Tuly Weisz and published in June 2018, for the 70th anniversary of the Israeli Declaration of Independence. It contains the full text of the Hebrew Bible along with scholarly introductions to each book of the Bible and various maps, charts, illustrations, and photographs. Weisz says that his bible is the only one "exclusively dedicated to the Land of Israel, the people of Israel and the God of Israel". The commentary, by a team of Orthodox rabbis, draws a strong connection between biblical Israel and the modern State of Israel. It is published by Menorah Books, an imprint of Koren Publishers Jerusalem, and the Hebrew text follows the Miqra According to the Masorah (MAM) edition. The book is aimed at both Jews and Christians. The forward was written by Rabbi Shlomo Riskin, founder of the Center for Jewish-Christian Understanding and Cooperation.
