= The Holy Bible: A Purified Translation =

2000 edition of the New Testament

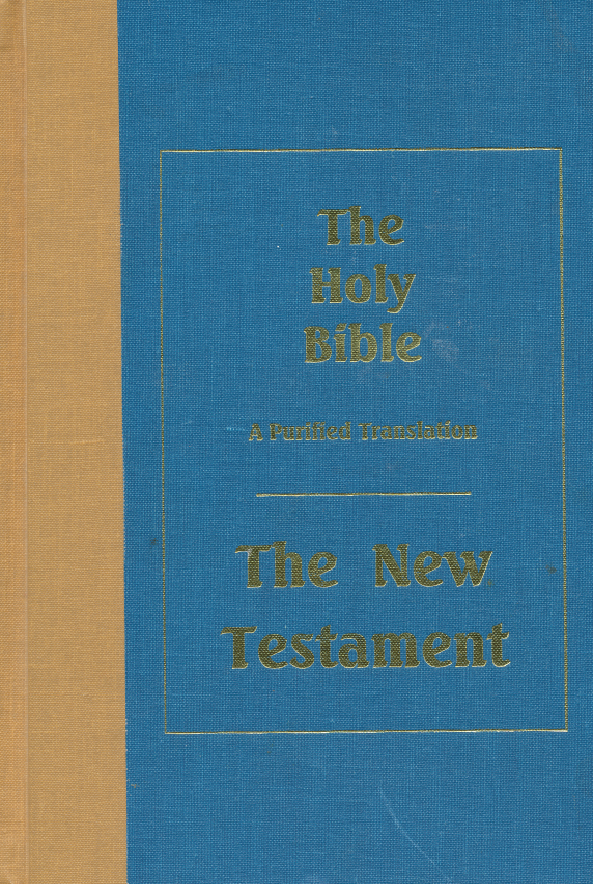
Cover of the Purified Translation of the Christian Bible

The Holy Bible: A Purified Translation is an edition of the New Testament which was published in 2000. A year earlier, 40,000 copies of the Gospel of John from this translation had been mailed to Southern Baptist pastors. It was translated by Stephen Mills Reynolds, and published by the Lorine L. Reynolds Foundation as a memorial to his wife. Reynolds (a graduate of Miami University, Princeton Theological Seminary, Princeton University, and Columbia University) previously served on the translation committee of the New International Version (NIV).

The preface explains that in contrast to many modern English Bible translations it has "been purified of errors that have misled people, in some cases for centuries" (p. vii). The main issue that has been addressed in this "purification" is the drinking of alcohol by Christians, the translator believing that Christians should completely refrain from drinking alcoholic beverages and become teetotalers. "Dr. Reynolds goes to extraordinary lengths to support his convictions regarding the use of alcohol." Reynolds explained some of his translation decisions in the Journal of Ethics and Bible Translation 1.1 (1995).

The Purified Translation has had mixed reviews, with some focused on the matter of translating oinos, the Greek word that is traditionally translated with "wine". The book contains notes on the translator's translations of Micah 2:11 and Proverbs 23:31. It was reported in June 1999 that there was a plan to finish the entire Bible by 2004, but that did not happen. The Purified Translation doesn't use "thee" and "thou", but uses "you" followed by a grave accent to indicate the use of singular you (i.e. "you`"); a normal "you" is used to indicate the plural form.
