= God's New Covenant: A New Testament Translation =

Modern English translation of the Greek New Testament

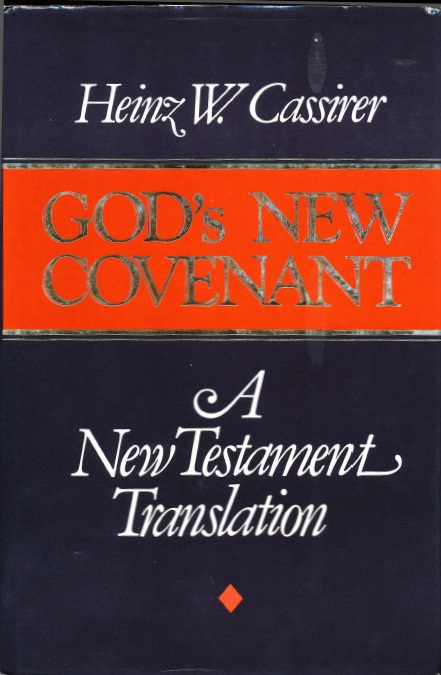

God's New Covenant: A New Testament Translation is a modern English translation by Heinz Cassirer of the Greek New Testament, published posthumously in 1989, 10 years after his death.

Cassirer completed his translation of the New Testament in just thirteen months.

Below is a sample passage, Matthew 7:24-25.

What, then, is the nature of the person, whoever he may be, who hears these words of mine and acts on them? He is like a man of prudence who built his house on a rock. The rain descended, the floodwaters rose, the winds blew and hurled themselves against the house. But it did not fall because it was on a rock that its foundations was laid.
