= Everett Fox =

- Born: 1947 (age 78–79)

Academic background
- Education: Brandeis University

Academic work
- Discipline: Biblical studies
- Institutions: Clark University
- Main interests: Hebrew Bible
- Notable works: The Five Books of Moses

Everett Fox is a scholar and translator of the Hebrew Bible. A graduate of Brandeis University, he is also a Professor of Language, Literature and Culture at Clark University. He holds a variety of degrees in Near Eastern and Judaic Studies, with his work focusing on aspects of Judaic studies such as translation.

== Education and Professional Experience ==
In the 1960s and 1970s, Fox received a B.A, M.A and Ph.D. in Near and Judaic Studies from Brandeis University. He has also taught in congregations across many English-speaking countries, and his work in translation of religious text has been used to help build Jewish literacy in the Jewish community.

Fox is also known as an author of various books focusing on religious text. The Jewish talent provider, Kolot Management, details the publishing of his book, The Five Books of Moses, in 1995. In tandem, he has also translated for the books The Early Prophets, and Give us a King!, which is a modern translation of the religious texts, Samuel I and II. In addition, Fox also served as the religious consultant for the animated film, The Prince of Egypt, and collaborated with Schwebel, an American-Israeli artist who portrayed religious tales against the backdrop of Jerusalem in the 1980s.

=== Text Translation and Interpretation ===
Fox is perhaps best known for his English translation of the Torah. His translation is heavily influenced by the principles of Martin Buber and Franz Rosenzweig. Buber, in 1962, completed his translation of the Hebrew Bible into German. Fox, with Lawrence Rosenwald of Wellesley College, co-translated Buber and Rosenzweig's Scripture and Translation into English (Weissbort and Eysteinsson 562). The main guiding principle of Fox's work is that the aural aspects of the Hebrew text should be translated as closely as possible. Instances of Hebrew word play, puns, word repetition, alliteration, and other literary devices of sound are echoed in English and, as with Buber-Rosenzweig, the text is printed in linear, not paragraph, fashion. He has argued for the superiority of Biblical translations that preserve or reflect such Hebrew forms and pushes English further than does Robert Alter, whose translations are motivated by a similar appreciation of the character of the Hebrew original.

Fox's translation of the Torah was published in 1995 by Schocken Books (a division of Random House) as The Five Books of Moses. Fox continues to translate, and in 1999 published Give Us a King!, a translation of the books of Samuel. His translation of the complete Early Prophets (the books of Joshua, Judges, Samuel (revised) and Kings) was published in November 2014 as The Schocken Bible: Volume II.

Fox has also published works focusing on other aspects of biblical scripture that are connected with translation. One of those connected areas of emphasis is performance. In a chapter of the book, Ve-‘Ed Ya’aleh, Fox argues that all translation in scripture possesses performative characteristics, as the translator attempts to present the work creatively. He notes that Psalms is the most performance-bound book within the Bible.

== Academic Work and Themes ==
=== Sibling related motif ===
Another area of Fox's work focuses on a common theme that is renowned in the Hebrew Bible- that is, the story of a character triumphing over their older sibling in some manner. Fox argues that this theme has inspired various interpretations throughout the works created through classical Jewish and Christian studies. He uses such examples as the heavy featuring of the neglect of first-born children in Genesis, a section of the Hebrew Bible.

=== Military Conflict and Magic ===
Fox's research has also, to some degree, focused on depictions of military conflict within religious scripture. This theme is focused on heavily in his 2014 publication, The Early Prophets: Joshua, Judges, Samuel, and Kings, which is a part of The Schocken Bible, Volume II. Fox directs the readers' attention to the theme of war by describing a section of the Book of Joshua that focuses on the conquest of Canaan. Fox details the evolution of the conflict from the charge of Yehoshua by YHWH (meaning Yahweh, the God of the Israelites), to the Israelites' arrival in Canaan. In "Waging War," the second part of The Early Prophets, Fox states that a section of the Book of Joshua focuses on the victimization of the Israelites through a ruse from the inhabitants of Giv'on, an area located southwest of Ai, a city in Canaan. Upon discovery of the deceit, the inhabitants are attacked. The Israelites then proceed to force those same inhabitants west to a town called Makkeda.

Fox continues his focus on war as a religious theme by discussing the Fall of Jericho, in which Yehoshua is instructed by YHWH to command the Israelite troops to circle the city of Jericho, and to besiege it. Another theme within the book is magic, which is also discussed by Fox. Yehoshua is instructed to attack Jericho after the Israelites blow seven shofars (horns) and recite a shout that is intended to demolish the walls of the city.

== Selected publications ==
- The Early Prophets: Joshua, Judges, Samuel, Kings, New York: Schocken Books, 2014, ISBN 978-0-8052-4181-5
- Give Us a King!: A New English Translation of the Book of Samuel. New York: Schocken Books. 1999. ISBN 0-8052-4160-4.
- The Five Books of Moses: (The Schocken Bible, Volume 1) A New English Translation with Commentary and Notes. New York: Schocken Books. 1995. ISBN 0-8052-1119-5.
- Scripture and Translation (translation of Buber and Rosenzweig, Die Schrift und ihre Verdeutschung) -- introduction, co-editor and co-translator with Lawrence Rosenwald. Bloomington: Indiana University Press. 1994.
- "Stalking the Younger Brother: Some Models for Understanding a Biblical Motif". Journal for the Study of the Old Testament. 18: 45–68. 1993.
- Holtz, Barry, ed. (1992). "The Bible and Its World". The Schocken Guide to Jewish Books. New York: Schocken Books. OCLC 23690471.

== Sources ==
- Weissbort, Daniel; Eysteinsson, Astradur, eds. (2006). "About Fox". Translation—Theory and Practice: A Historical Reader. Oxford: Oxford University Press. pp. 562–568. doi:10.1093/oso/9780198711995.001.0001.
