= Darby Bible =

Bible translated from Hebrew and Greek by John Nelson Darby

The Darby Bible (DBY, formal title The Holy Scriptures: A New Translation from the Original Languages by J. N. Darby) refers to the Bible as translated from Hebrew and Greek by John Nelson Darby.

== History and principles ==
Darby published a translation of the New Testament in 1867, with revised editions in 1872 and (after Darby's death) 1884. After his death, some of his students produced an Old Testament translation based on Darby's French and German translations (see below). The complete Darby Bible, including Darby's 3rd edition New Testament and his students' Old Testament, was first published in 1890.

Darby's purpose was, as he states in the preface to his English NT, to make a modern translation for the unlearned who have neither access to manuscript texts nor training and knowledge of ancient languages of the Scriptures. He was the principal scholar for a number of translations – and not the sole translator of any one of the various translations that bear his name. He worked with various brethren who had academic and spiritual qualifications. He also acknowledges dependence on the critical work of Samuel Prideaux Tregelles and various other scholars. Darby's translation work was not intended to be read aloud. His work was for study and private use. In his own oral ministry he generally used the English KJV.

When Darby first issued his New Translation into English he wrote in the preface to the Revelation: "if the reader find my translation exceedingly similar to Mr. William Kelly's, I can only rejoice in it, as mine was made a year or two before his came out, and he has never seen mine up to the time of my writing this ..." (Darby went on to write that his New Testament translation had been lying by him for some years then.) In his introduction to the 1871 German version, he wrote, "In the issue of this translation, the purpose is not to offer to the man of letters a learned work, but rather to provide the simple and unlearned reader with as exact a translation as possible."

In the Old Testament Darby translates the covenant name of God as "Jehovah" instead of rendering it "LORD" or "GOD" (in all capital letters) as most English translations do. This practice is followed by other widely used English translations, including Robert Young's Literal Translation (1862, 1898), The Julia E. Smith Parker Translation (1876), The American Standard Version (1901), The Bible in Living English (1972), Green's Literal Translation (1985), Recovery Version (1999), Holman Christian Standard Bible [Yahweh-2004], the Lexham Bible [Yahweh-2011], New Heart English Bible, Jehovah Edition (2010), The Divine Name King James Bible (2011), New World Translation (1961, 1984, 2013) and the Legacy Standard Bible (Yahweh-2021). The footnotes of many editions (such as the 1961 Modified Notes Edition) of Darby Bible's New Testament indicate where "Lord" ("Kurios" in Greek) in the scripture text probably refers to Jehovah. The 1961 Modified Notes Edition of the Darby Bible includes the 1871 New Testament Preface, which says in part: "All the instances in which the article is wanting before Kurios are not marked by brackets; but I give here all the passages in which Kurios, which the LXX employ for Jehovah, thence transferred to the New Testament, is used as a proper name; that is, has the sense of 'Jehovah.'" It then gives a listing of those places.

For some verses the Darby New Testament has detailed footnotes which make reference to his scholarly textual criticism comparisons.

Critics of the Darby Bible include Charles Spurgeon.

== Example verses ==
Genesis 1:1-3
In the beginning God created the heavens and the earth. And the earth was waste and empty, and darkness was on the face of the deep, and the Spirit of God was hovering over the face of the waters. And God said, Let there be light. And there was light.

Isaiah 34:14
And there shall the beasts of the desert meet with the jackals, and the wild goat shall cry to his fellow; the lilith also shall settle there, and find for herself a place of rest.

Psalm 119:89
LAMED. For ever, O Jehovah, thy word is settled in the heavens.

Matthew 6:9-13
Thus therefore pray *ye*: Our Father who art in the heavens, let thy name be sanctified, let thy kingdom come, let thy will be done as in heaven so upon the earth; give us to-day our needed bread, and forgive us our debts, as we also forgive our debtors, and lead us not into temptation, but save us from evil.

John 1:1-3
In [the] beginning was the Word, and the Word was with God, and the Word was God.*He* was in the beginning with God. All things received being through him, and without him not one [thing] received being which has received being.

John 7:16–17
Jesus therefore answered them and said, My doctrine is not mine, but that of him that has sent me. If any one desire to practise his will, he shall know concerning the doctrine, whether it is of God, or that I speak from myself.

Philippians 4:13
I have strength for all things in him that gives me power.

== Other languages ==
=== German ===
The Darby Bible in German is known as the "Elberfelder Bibel". Julius Anton von Poseck (1816–1896) had been translating some NT Epistles into German. In 1851 he sent his work in progress to Darby for review. This stimulated Darby to begin work in 1854 on a full translation and he proceeded on the German translation with von Poseck and Carl Brockhaus (1822–1899). The German NT was published in 1855. When von Poseck moved to England in 1857, the Old Testament translation was made by Darby, Brockhaus and a Dutch Hebraist, Hermanus Cornelis Voorhoeve (1837–1901). The OT work commenced 1869 and was completed in 1871, when the whole Bible was published. Since then there have been a number of significant updates and revisions, including the revisions in 1960, 1975, 1985 by R. Brockhaus Verlag Elberfeld (entitled: "Elberfelder Bibel") and most recently in 2003 by Christliche Schriftenverbreitung Hückeswagen (entitled: "Elberfelder Übersetzung, Edition CSV Hückeswagen").

Darby's principles of translation are in the Introduction to his German translation of the New Testament:

"Now whilst the learned can examine the original text, this privilege is out of the reach of the unlearned, and of those unacquainted with that text. It has therefore been our endeavour and object to give a helping hand to the latter class, and to furnish them at a small cost with as faithful and exact a representation as possible of the divine word in their own language. Undoubtedly every translation must be more or less defective, and we by no means value our work so highly as that we would set aside one more perfectly executed by another hand. How great the difficulties are of conveying the expressions of one language, especially of the rich Greek, in another, those alone can tell who have tried to make a translation. [...] We might indeed have clothed many passages in more elegant German, but, without being in bondage to words, we have been governed throughout by the thought that the faithful rendering of the original text outweighs every other consideration; and the more so because we believe with the very fullest conviction the divine inspiration of the holy scriptures as the revelation of the infinite wisdom of God, and the expression of His gracious character in Jesus Christ. But since no one is able to grasp the whole expanse of this revelation, and often a meaning beyond the comprehension of the translator lies hidden in a sentence, which would be lost in a free translation but may be found in a more literal one, through deeper teaching of the Holy Spirit—it is evidently necessary to reproduce the original text as in a mirror."

=== French ===
William Joseph Lowe (1840–1927) and Pierre Schlumberger were in the translation team for the Pau-Vevey French translation which was first issued in 1859. The title page read, 'Les Livres Saints connus sous le Nom de Nouveau Testament. Version nouvelle .' Darby worked on this project in Pau, Southern France, but the work was done primarily for the numerous Brethren in French-speaking Switzerland. The translation of the New Testament was reissued in 1872, 1875 and 1878. The complete Bible appeared in 1885.

=== Dutch ===
The 'Darby' New Translation of the New Testament in Dutch is chiefly the work of H. C. Voorhoeve, but he seems to have leaned somewhat on the labours of the German team. His work has gone through a number of revisions. The most recent (5th) edition of the Voorhoeve Testament known as the 'Telos' translation is the work of J. Klein Haneveld, Willem J. Ouweneel, Henk P. Medema and Gerard H. Kramer in 1982. This last edition has been updated and is republished by Grace Publishing House in 2018.

An anonymous 'Darby' type translation of the Psalms also exists and is available from Uit Het Woord Der Waarheid, Aalten, Netherlands.

=== Italian ===
Numerous biographies of Darby suggest he completed work on an Italian New Testament. His work has not been located but a translation based on his French work was completed by Plymouth Brethren members, Edward Lawrence Bevir (1847–1922) (one of JND's peers) and revised by Alexander Carruthers (1860–1930). The Italian NT was first issued in 1890 and a revision was completed in 1930. It is still in print (2008).

=== Swedish ===
This edition of the New Testament arose out of the peculiar tendency among the Taylor Exclusive Brethren to complete and exact uniformity. Its page layout is almost precisely similar to the English edition produced by the Taylor Brethren in 1961 and published by AB Petersons Foerlag, Gothenburg. The principal work was done by Eric Carrén and is in fact a tertiary translation based on the German and other Darby translations of the New Testament.

The Swedish 'Darby' New Testament is still in print (2008).

Previous attempts to produce a 'Darby' type translation of the New Testament had been made by a Glanton brother. He tentatively published at least two of Paul's Epistles in booklet form (copies held at Cross Archive, London).

=== Further languages ===
A number of foreign language translations show their dependence upon Darby's work. These include W. H. Westcott's Congo vernacular Bible, Victor Danielson's Faroese work and the Romanian Bible published by Gute Botschaft Verlag, Dillenburg, Germany. A Slovak New Testament has been issued by Kingston Bible Trust on the basis of Darby's work. It contains annotations by F. E. Raven.

== Sources ==
- Bible Archive, Fountain House, Wilshire, London SE18
- Bible Museum, Wuppertal, Germany
