= Green's Literal Translation =

English Bible translation

- Full name: Literal Translation of the Holy Bible
- Other names: King James III Version
- Abbreviation: LITV, KJ3
- Language: English
- Complete Bible published: 1985
- Authorship: Jay P. Green, Sr.
- Textual basis: Old Testament: Masoretic Text, New Testament: Textus Receptus
- Translation type: Formal equivalence
- Reading level: High School
- Publisher: Sovereign Grace Publishers
- Copyright: Copyright 1985, Sovereign Grace Publishers
- Religious affiliation: Protestant Inter-denominational
- Genesis 1:1–3 In the beginning God created the heavens and the earth; and the earth being without form and empty, and darkness being on the face of the deep, and the Spirit of God hovering on the face of the waters, and God said, Let light be! And there was light. John 3:16 For God so loved the world that He gave His only begotten Son, that everyone believing into Him should not perish, but have everlasting life.

Green's Literal Translation or the Literal Translation of the Holy Bible (LITV) is a translation of the Bible by Jay P. Green Sr., first published in 1985. The LITV takes a literal, formal equivalence approach to translation. The Masoretic Text is used as the Hebrew basis for the Old Testament, and the Textus Receptus is used as the Greek basis for the New Testament. This translation is available in book form and is freely available online for use with the e-Sword software program. Some also refer to it as the "KJ3" or "KJV3" (KJ = King James).

The translation was integrated into the 1986 edition of Green's Hebrew-English-Greek Interlinear Bible.

== Translation philosophy ==
Explaining his translation philosophy for the LITV, the Green stated, regarding the Old Testament:

The Hebrews were basically a pastoral people. Their language originally was pictorial, and as such it was descriptive by nature. For example, their place names were descriptive: 'The Graves of Lust; The Valley of the Giants,' etc. In this volume these true meanings are revealed, not mere transliteration of the Hebrew letters being made to suffice. The personification of everything (there were no neuters to the Hebrews, nor any merely secular objects), gleams through a literal translation -- for all things and all men were perceived in relation to God Almighty. This literal translation tends to bring the reader into the frame of mind that existed in the times the Biblical words were written. That then promotes a full understanding.

Green's translation renders the Tetragrammaton (יהוה YHWH) as Jehovah in 6,866 places throughout the Old Testament. With respect to the transliteration of the Tetragrammaton, Green opined that the worst approach was to transliterate the name as LORD, writing that "Every nation had their lords, but only Israel had Jehovah as their God. All other countries were the nations."

Regarding his translation philosophy and the New Testament, the author stated:

As for the Greek, it is noted as a language that has a word for every occasion. This vivid variety of expression is evident in the Holy Scriptures. Yet the Greek commonly in use, rather than the classical Greek, was written by Peter the unlearned fisherman, Luke the learned Physician, and by Paul the trained theologian. In conveying to the Bible student the commands and principles of God, it is important that the translator also convey in literal, simple English what God has written for His people. A translation of the Bible is no place to show off the vocabulary and erudition of the translator.

In addition, every precaution was taken to preserve the particulars of the text; each verb is carefully scrutinized to maintain its tense, number, voice and mood; the case of each noun examined to retain its proper function in sentence; each participle carefully translated to preserve its aspect. Sense words (words added by the translator to make a sentence more intelligible) are kept to an absolute minimum without sacrificing readability, and when used are always bracketed so that you know which words are God's and which are the translator's. You won't find a more literal rendition of the very words of God in any other version (not even in the NASB)!

There are mysterious things, things hard to understand (2 Peter 3:15,16) in the Scriptures, but it is not the literal meanings of the Hebrew or Greek words that cause this to be so. The "different gospel" preached by those "troubling you and desiring to pervert the gospel of Christ," cannot be justly derived from the literal words written by the Divine penmen, for these holy men were "borne along by the Holy Spirit," (1 Peter 1:21). This plan of this volume is not to lead (or mislead) the reader, but to bring him or her face to face with God by simply giving the literal meanings of the words which He had written for our spiritual direction. In doing this we adhere to His maxim, "Let God be true, and every man a liar" (Romans 3:4).

== Comparisons ==
Examples comparing the LITV to the King James Version and other Bible versions based on the same Hebrew and Greek manuscripts:

Verse	Literal Translation of the Holy Bible	King James Version	New King James Version	Modern English Version	1599 Geneva Bible	Young's Literal Translation
Isaiah 7:14	So, The Lord Himself will give you a sign: Behold! The virgin will conceive and will bring forth a son; and she shall call His name Immanuel.	Therefore, the Lord himself shall give you a sign; Behold, a virgin shall conceive, and bear a son, and shall call his name Immanuel.	Therefore, the Lord Himself will give you a sign: Behold, the virgin shall conceive and bear a Son, and shall call His name Immanuel.	Therefore, the Lord Himself shall give you a sign: The virgin shall conceive, and bear a son, and shall call his name Immanuel.	Therefore, the Lord himself will give you a sign. Behold, the virgin shall conceive and bear a son, and she shall call his name Immanuel.	Therefore, the Lord Himself giveth to you a sign, Lo, the Virgin is conceiving, And is bringing forth a son, And hath called his name Immanuel,
Psalms 119:89	Your Word is settled in Heaven forever, O Jehovah.	For ever, O LORD, thy word is settled in heaven.	Forever, O LORD, Your word is settled in heaven.	Forever, O LORD, Your word is established in heaven.	O Lord, thy word endureth forever in heaven.	To the age, O Jehovah, Thy word is set up in the heavens.
Ezra 9:3	And when I heard this thing, I tore my garments and my robe, and plucked off the hair of my head and of my beard, and sat down stunned.	And when I heard this thing, I rent my garment and my mantle, and plucked off the hair of my head and of my beard, and sat down astonied.	So when I heard this thing, I tore my garment and my robe, and plucked out some of the hair of my head and beard, and sat down astonished.	When I heard this, I tore my clothes and my robe, plucked out the hair of my head and from my beard, and sat down astonished.	But when I heard this saying, I rent my clothes and my garment, and plucked off the hair of mine head, and of my beard, and sat down astonied.	And at my hearing this word, I have rent my garment and my upper robe, and pluck out of the hair of my head, and of my beard, and sit astonished,
Isaiah 11:8	And the infant shall play on the hole of the asp; yea, the weaned child shall put his hand on the viper's den.	And the sucking child shall play on the hole of the asp, and the weaned child shall put his hand on the cockatrice' den.	The nursing child shall play by the cobra's hole, And the weaned child shall put his hand in the viper's den.	The nursing child shall play by the hole of the asp, and the weaned child shall put his hand in the viper's den.	And the sucking child shall play upon the hole of the asp, and the weaned child shall put his hand upon the cockatrice hole.	And played hath a suckling by the hole of an asp, And on the den of a cockatrice Hath the weaned one put his hand.
Luke 11:8	I say to you, Even if rising up he will not give to him because he is a friend, yet because of his shameless insisting, rising up he will give him as many as he needs.	I say unto you, Though he will not rise and give him, because he is his friend, yet because of his importunity he will rise and give him as many as he needeth.	I say to you, though he will not rise and give to him because he is his friend, yet because of his persistence he will rise and give him as many as he needs.	I say to you, though he will not rise and give him anything because he is his friend, yet because of his persistence he will rise and give him as much as he needs.	I say unto you, Though he would not arise and give him, because he is his friend, yet doubtless because of his importunity, he would rise and give him as many as he needed.	`I say to you, even if he will not give to him, having risen, because of his being his friend, yet because of his importunity, having risen, he will give him as many as he doth need;
Romans 10:3	For being ignorant of the righteousness of God, and seeking to establish their own righteousness, they did not submit to the righteousness of God.	For they being ignorant of God's righteousness, and going about to establish their own righteousness, have not submitted themselves unto the righteousness of God.	For they being ignorant of God's righteousness, and seeking to establish their own righteousness, have not submitted to the righteousness of God.	For, being ignorant of God's righteousness and seeking to establish their own righteousness, they did not submit to the righteousness of God.	For they, being ignorant of the righteousness of God, and going about to establish their own righteousness, have not submitted themselves to the righteousness of God.	for not knowing the righteousness of God, and their own righteousness seeking to establish, to the righteousness of God they did not submit.
2 Thessalonians 2:8	And then "the Lawless One" will be revealed, "whom" "the Lord" "will consume" "by the spirit of His mouth," and will bring to nought by the brightness of His presence.	And then shall that Wicked be revealed, whom the Lord shall consume with the spirit of his mouth, and shall destroy with the brightness of his coming:	And then the lawless one will be revealed, whom the Lord will consume with the breath of His mouth and destroy with the brightness of His coming.	Then the lawless one will be revealed, whom the Lord will consume with the breath of His mouth, and destroy with the brightness of His presence,	And then shall that wicked man be revealed, whom the Lord shall consume with the Spirit of his mouth, and shall abolish with the brightness of his coming,	and then shall be revealed the Lawless One, whom the Lord shall consume with the spirit of his mouth, and shall destroy with the manifestation of his presence,
Hebrews 13:5	Set your way of life without money-loving, being satisfied with present things; for He has said, "Not at all will I leave you, not at all will I forsake you," never!	Let your conversation be without covetousness; and be content with such things as ye have: for he hath said, I will never leave thee, nor forsake thee.	Let your conduct be without covetousness; be content with such things as you have. For He Himself has said, "I will never leave you nor forsake you."	Let your lives be without love of money, and be content with the things you have. For He has said:"I will never leave you, nor forsake you."	Let your conversation be without covetousness, and be content with those things that ye have, for he hath said,	Without covetousness the behaviour, being content with the things present, for He hath said, `No, I will not leave, no, nor forsake thee,'
1 John 5:7	For there are three bearing witness in Heaven: the Father, the Word, and the Holy Spirit; and these three are one.	For there are three that bear record in heaven, the Father, the Word, and the Holy Ghost: and these three are one.	For there are three that bear witness in heaven: the Father, the Word, and the Holy Spirit; and these three are one.	There are three who testify in heaven: the Father, the Word, and the Holy Spirit, and the three are one.	For there are three, which bear record in heaven, the Father, the Word, and the holy Ghost: and these three are one.	because three are who are testifying [in the heaven, the Father, the Word, and the Holy Spirit, and these -- the three -- are one;
Acts 8:37	And Philip said, If you believe from all the heart, it is lawful. And answering he said, I believe Jesus Christ to be the Son of God.	And Philip said, If thou believest with all thine heart, thou mayest. And he answered and said, I believe that Jesus Christ is the Son of God.	Then Philip said, "If you believe with all your heart, you may." And he answered and said, "I believe that Jesus Christ is the Son of God."	Philip said, "If you believe with all your heart, you may." He answered, "I believe that Jesus Christ is the Son of God."	And Philip said unto him, If thou believest with all thine heart, thou mayest. Then he answered, and said, I believe that that Jesus Christ is that Son of God.	[And Philip said, `If thou dost believe out of all the heart, it is lawful;' and he answering said, `I believe Jesus Christ to be the Son of God;']
Philippians 4:13	I have strength for all things in Christ the One strengthening me.	I can do all things through Christ which strengtheneth me.	I can do all things through Christ who strengthens me.	I can do all things because of Christ who strengthens me.	I am able to do all things through the help of Christ, which strengtheneth me.	For all things I have strength, in Christ's strengthening me;
