= Heinz Cassirer =

German philosopher

Heinrich (Heinz) Walter Cassirer (9 August 1903 – 20 February 1979) was a Kantian philosopher, son of a famous German philosopher, Ernst Cassirer. Being Jews, the Cassirer family fled the Nazis in the 1930s. As a refugee scholar, Heinz went to University of Glasgow working with Professor H. J. Paton, who persuaded him to write a book on Kant's third Critique, the Critique of Judgment. Following Paton, he moved to Oxford, lecturing at Corpus Christi College, where his students included Iris Murdoch (Weitzman: 1999). He returned to the University of Glasgow in 1946, having been appointed to a permanent lectureship, and remained there until 1960 when he withdrew to focus on newfound biblical interests.

He was a noted scholar on the thought of Kant. He thought highly of Karl Barth's understanding of Kant. Cassirer, a "translator and interpreter of Kant, is reliably reported to have asked, ‘Why is it that this Swiss theologian understands Kant far better than any philosopher I have come across?’" (Gunton 2002: xvi). While at Glasgow, his observations of society in Scotland led him to speak of "'Highland ravings' - the obsessive clinging on to what is wholly illusory" (Weitzman 1997: 30).

As a middle-aged adult, reading the New Testament for the first time, Cassirer was struck by the writings of St. Paul in relation to ethics. As he studied, he committed himself to the Christian faith and was baptized in the Anglican Church in 1955. He produced a translation of the New Testament from the Greek sources, titled God's New Covenant: A New Testament Translation. His translation is also noted for its formal language. Below is a sample passage, Matthew 7:24-25.

"What, then, is the nature of the person, whoever he may be, who hears these words of mine and acts on them? He is like a man of prudence who built his house on a rock. The rain descended, the floodwaters rose, the winds blew and hurled themselves against that house. But it did not fall because it was on rock that its foundations were laid."

Cassirer's translation efforts began with a topic-based collation of Paul's letters, divided into forty categories. This work went through several iterations and a list of the category headings is printed at the end of God's New Covenant: A New Testament Translation (pp. 493–494). In the final year of his life, Cassirer also completed a translation of Sophocles' last play, Oedipus at Colonus.

== Writings by Heinz Cassirer ==
- 1927. 'Des Nicolaus Cusanus Schrift vom Geist' i.e. a German translation of Nicolas of Cusa's de Mente, included as an appendix to E. Cassirer, Individuum und Kosmos in der Philosophie der Renaissance. Leipzig & Berlin: Studien der Bibliothek Warburg.
- 1932. Aristoteles' Schrift "Von der Seele" und ihre Stellung innerhalb der aristotelischen Philosophie. J.C.B. Mohr: Tubingen.
- 1938. A commentary on Kant's Critique of Judgment. London: Methuen.
- 1954. Kant's First Critique. Muirhead Library of Philosophy. London: Allen and Unwin.
- 1989. God's New Covenant: A New Testament Translation. Grand Rapids: Eerdmans.
- 1988. Grace and Law: St. Paul, Kant, and the Hebrew Prophets. Grand Rapids: Eerdmans.
- 1998. Critique of Practical Reason. Immanuel Kant. A new translation by H. W. Cassirer. Milwaukee: Marquette University Press. (Edited by R. Weitzman and G.H. King.)

== Sources ==
- Chamberlin, William. 1991. Catalogue of English Bible Translations: A Classified Bibliography of Versions and Editions Including Books, Parts, and Old and New Testament Apocrypha. Greenwood Press.
- Gunton, Colin. 2002. Introduction to Protestant Theology in the Nineteenth Century: its background and history by Karl Barth. Grand Rapids: Eerdmans.
- Paul, William. 2003. English Language Bible Translators. Jefferson, NC: McFarland and Company.
- Weitzman, Ronald. 1997. MacMillan's 'Inés de Castro' at the Edinburgh Festival. Tempo No. 199: 29-32.
- Weitzman, Ronald. 1999. Letter to J. Janet (research assistant to Murdoch's biographer, Peter Conradi). Copy held at Kingston University Archives, ref. KUAS6/2/7/3.
