= David H. Stern =

American Messianic Jewish writer (1935–2022)

- Born: October 31, 1935; Los Angeles, California
- Died: October 8, 2022 (aged 86); Jerusalem, Israel
- Occupation: Theologian

David Harold Stern (October 31, 1935 – October 8, 2022) was an American-born Messianic Jewish theologian who lived in Israel. He was the third son of Harold Stern and Marion Levi Stern.

== Family background ==
David Stern was a descendant of one of the early Jewish pioneer families in Los Angeles. The Stern family was among the first 20 Jewish families to settle in Los Angeles in the mid-1800s and were instrumental in founding the Wilshire Boulevard Temple.

Stern's grandfather, Jacob Stern, was a significant figure in early Hollywood history. Jacob Stern owned a home at what is now the famous intersection of Hollywood and Vine. In 1913, Cecil B. DeMille made his first Hollywood film Strawman in the barn behind Stern's home, renting half of it. That barn, now preserved, was moved near the Hollywood Bowl and became part of a movie museum. In addition, Jacob Stern built the Hollywood Plaza Hotel, a luxury hotel at Hollywood and Vine, in the 1920s.

== Early life and education ==
Stern was born in Los Angeles on October 31, 1935. He attended UCLA as an undergraduate, earning his B.A. in economics. He also received a Master of Divinity degree from Fuller Theological Seminary as well as an M.A. and Ph.D. in economics from Princeton University.

== Career ==
Stern was an economics professor at UCLA and taught the first course in Judaism and Christianity at Fuller Theological Seminary. In 1979 Stern emigrated to Jerusalem, where he remained active in Israel's Messianic Jewish community as a writer and translator.

== Complete Jewish Bible ==
Stern's major work is the Complete Jewish Bible, his English translation of the Tanakh and New Testament (which he, like many Messianic Jews, refers to as the "B'rit Hadashah", from the Hebrew term ברית חדשה, often translated "new covenant", used in Jeremiah 31). One unique feature of Stern's translation is the wide usage of transliteration, rather than literal translation, throughout the Bible. For the New Testament, Greek proper nouns are often replaced with transliterated Hebrew words. Stern himself refers to this as a "cosmetic" treatment.

Other notable characteristics of Stern's translation include the translating of Greek phrases about "the law" as having to do with "Torah-legalism" instead. More explanation is found in his Messianic Jewish Manifesto (now out of print) and his Messianic Judaism: A Modern Movement With an Ancient Past (a revision of the Manifesto).

== Personal life and death ==
Stern married Martha Frankel Stern in 1976., and had two children. He died in Jerusalem on October 8, 2022.

== Bibliography ==
=== Books ===
- Surfing Guide to Southern California (with Bill Cleary) – 1st ed.: Fitzpatrick 1963. Current ed.: Mountain & Sea 1998, ISBN 0-911449-06-X
- Restoring the Jewishness of the Gospel – Jewish New Testament Publications, Jerusalem, 1988, ISBN 965-359-001-4
- Messianic Jewish Manifesto – Jewish New Testament Publications, Jerusalem, 1988, ISBN 965-359-002-2
- Messianic Judaism: A Modern Movement With An Ancient Past – Jewish New Testament Publications, Jerusalem, 2007, ISBN 1-880226-33-2
- Jewish New Testament: A Translation of the New Testament that Expresses its Jewishness – Jewish New Testament Publications, Jerusalem, and Clarksville MD, 1989, ISBN 965-359-006-5
- The Jewish New Testament Commentary: A Companion Volume to the Jewish New Testament – Jewish New Testament Publications, Jerusalem, 1992, ISBN 978-9653590113
- Complete Jewish Bible – Jewish New Testament Publications, Jerusalem, September 1998, ISBN 965-359-018-9
- How Jewish Is Christianity? (with others) (ed. Louis Goldberg) – Zondervan, 2003, ISBN 0-310-24490-0
