= John Edgar McFadyen =

John Edgar McFadyen B. A. (Oxon), M. A., D. D. (17 July 1870 – 1933) was a Scottish theologian, was professor of language, literature and Old Testament theology in the University of Glasgow. He was born in Glasgow and died in 1933.

He produced translations of a number of books of the Bible in what he labelled "modern speech". His translations of Job and Psalms strove to be metrical, to reflect their poetic originals. He learned Esperanto in 1907 during a stay in Chautauqua, New York, and was a prominent proponent of that language.

== Writings ==
- The Messages of the Prophetic and Priestly Historians, Vol. 4 in The Messages of the Bible, 1901, published by Scribner & Sons
- In the Hour of Silence, 1902.
- Old Testament Criticism and the Christian Church, 1903.
- The Prayers of the Bible. London: Hodder & Stoughton, 1906
- "The Prophets and the Priestly Historians" and "The Psalmists" in The Messages of the Bible, 1909, published by Kent and Sanders.
- The Epistles to the Corinthians and Galatians in the series "The Interpreters Commentary of the New Testament", 1909.
- The Problem of Pain: a study in the Book of Job, c. 1910.
- The Epistles to the Corinthians, (translation) 1911.
- A Cry for Justice: a study in Amos, 1912.
- The Psalms in Modern Speech and Rhythmical Form, 1916.
- The Wisdom Books in Modern Speech and Rhythmical Form (Job, Proverbs, Ecclesiastes, Lamentations, and Song of Solomon), 1917.
- Isaiah in Modern Speech, 1918.
- Jeremiah in Modern Speech, 1919.
- The Use of the Old Testament in the Light of Modern Knowledge, 1922.
- The Approach to the Old Testament, 1926.
- A Guide to the Understanding of the Old Testament, 1927.
- Old Testament Scenes and Characters, 1928.
- The Message of Israel: The Chalmers lectures, 1931.
- Learning and Life, 1934.
- Studies in Psalms, 1936.
- Key to the Exercises in the Late Professor A. B. Davidson's "Revised Introductory Hebrew Grammar" , 1951.

== Sources ==
- Paul, William (2003) "McFadyen, John Edgar" in: English Language Bible Translators, p. 159. Jefferson, NC and London: McFarland and Company
