= Wessex Gospels =

Old English translation of the Gospels

The Wessex Gospels (also known as the West-Saxon Gospels or Old English Gospels) are a translation of the four gospels of the Christian Bible into a West Saxon dialect of Old English. Produced from approximately AD 990 in England, this version has been considered the first translation of all four gospels into stand-alone Old English text. Seven manuscript copies survive. Its transcribing was supervised by the monk Ælfric of Eynsham.

The text of Matthew 6:9–13, the Lord's Prayer, is as follows:

Fæder ure þu þe eart on heofonum, si þin nama gehalgod. To becume þin rice, gewurþe ðin willa, on eorðan swa swa on heofonum. Urne gedæghwamlican hlaf syle us todæg, and forgyf us ure gyltas, swa swa we forgyfað urum gyltendum. And ne gelæd þu us on costnunge, ac alys us of yfele. Soþlice.
