= Webster's Revision =

Bible version by Noah Webster

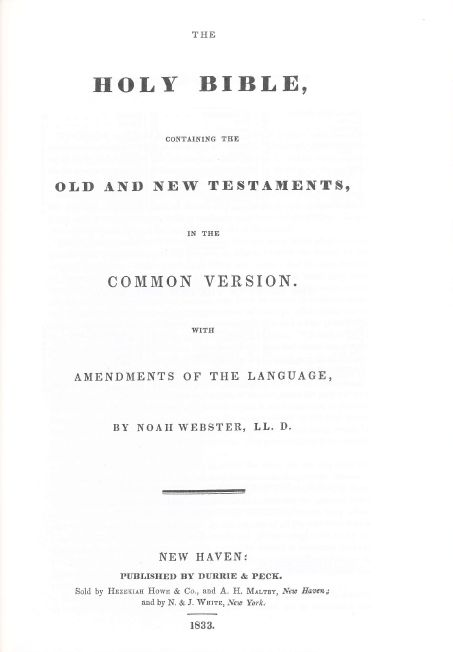
Title page of Noah Webster's revised Bible of 1833

Noah Webster's 1833 limited revision of the King James Version, (more commonly called Webster Bible) focused mainly on replacing archaic words and making simple grammatical changes. For example: "why" instead of "wherefore", "its" instead of "his" when referring to nonliving things, "male child" instead of "manchild", etc. He also introduced euphemisms to remove words which he found to be offensive: "whore" becomes "lewd woman". He changed some of the spelling of the 1611 version, some of which had been changed by British usage since 1611 and others that he himself had deliberately changed in his dictionary to reflect an American identity over a British one. Overall, very few changes were made, and the result is a book which is almost indistinguishable from the King James Version. It has sometimes been called the Common Version (which is not to be confused with the Common Bible of 1973, an ecumenical edition of the Revised Standard Version).

Modern critics are surprised by just how little Webster changed the King James Version. His revision was very light, as he did not want to make the language wholly contemporary, but rather wanted to correct flaws he disagreed with as an educator. Other, less orthodox Americans were bringing out their own versions of the New Testament, but he had no interest in theologically motivated changes. One notable change that was beyond just revising language flaws was a correction changing the word "Easter" in Acts 12:4 to the word "Passover".

Throughout Webster's Revision of the King James Bible, the lexicographer replaced "Holy Ghost" with "Holy Spirit". Webster did so because he knew that in the Christians' Scriptures this expression did not mean "an apparition". In the preface of his Bible, Webster wrote: "Some words have fallen into disuse; and the signification of others, in current popular use, is not the same now as it was when they were introduced into the version. The effect of these changes is, that some words are not understood by common readers, who have no access to commentaries, and who will always compose a great proportion of readers; while other words, being now used in a sense different from that which they had when the translation was made, present a wrong signification or false ideas. Whenever words are understood in a sense different from that which they had been introduced, and different from that of the original languages, they do not present to the reader the Word of God."
