= Jay P. Green =

American minister and translator

Jay Patrick Green Sr. (December 1, 1918 – May 20, 2008) was an ordained minister and Bible translator.

Green was born in Ennis, Kentucky. He earned degrees from Washington University in St. Louis, Toronto Baptist Seminary, and Covenant Theological Seminary.

His motivation to produce an accessible, more easily understood translation of the Bible began when he tried to read the King James Version to his children and they asked, "Daddy, why don't you make a Bible that we can understand?" His first effort was The Children's King James Version, New Testament (1960). He went on to produce a large number of translations of the Bible into English, some revised multiple times, including The Interlinear Hebrew-Greek-English Bible, in One-Volume. He once described himself as "the most experienced Bible translator now alive" (Paul 2003:99).

He died in Lafayette, Indiana, in 2008.

== Partial list of publications ==
- Literal Translation of the Holy Bible. 1985. Sovereign Grace Publishers.
- The Children's 'King James' Bible New Testament. 1960. Modern Bible Translations, Inc.
- The Teen-Age Version of the Holy Bible. 1962. McGraw-Hill.
- The Children's Version of the Holy Bible. 1962. McGraw-Hill.
- The Living Scriptures: A New Translation in the King James Tradition (New Testament). 1966. National Foundation for Christian Education: Marshallton, DE.
- King James II Version of the Bible. 1971. Associated Publishers and Authors: Grand Rapids.
- KJ3 Literal Translation New Testament Word for Word English Translation From The Greek Textus Receptus Text. 2006. Authors For Christ, Inc.
- Modern King James Version of the Holy Bible. New York: McGraw-Hill.
- The Living Scriptures: A New Translation in the King James Version Tradition. National Foundation for Religious Education.
- King James Version—Twentieth Century Edition. Tyndale Bible Society.
- The Gnostics, the New Versions, and the Deity of Christ, by Jay P. Green Sr. and George Whitefield. 2000. Sovereign Grace Publishers.
- A Concise Lexicon to the Biblical Languages. 1987. Hendrickson Publishing: Peabody, Massachusetts.
- Unholy Hands on the Bible. 1998. Sovereign Grace Publishing.
