= New King James Version =

English translation of the Bible

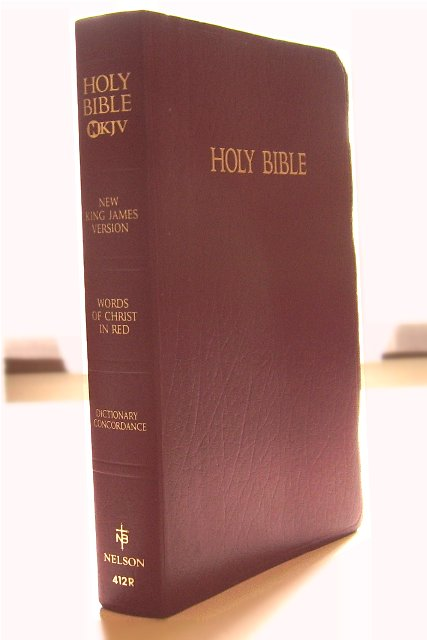
- Abbreviation: NKJV
- OT published: 1982
- NT published: 1979
- Derived from: King James Version
- Textual basis: OT: Biblia Hebraica Stuttgartensia (4th ed., 1977) and additional sources; NT: Textus Receptus
- Translation type: Formal equivalence
- Version revision: 1984
- Publisher: Thomas Nelson
- Copyright: The Holy Bible, New King James Version® Copyright © 1982 by Thomas Nelson.
- Religious affiliation: Protestant
- Webpage: www.thomasnelsonbibles.com/nkjv-bible/
- Genesis 1:1–3 In the beginning God created the heavens and the earth. The earth was without form, and void; and darkness was on the face of the deep. And the Spirit of God was hovering over the face of the waters. Then God said, "Let there be light"; and there was light. John 3:16 For God so loved the world that He gave His only begotten Son, that whoever believes in Him should not perish but have everlasting life.

The New King James Version (NKJV) is a translation of the Bible in contemporary English, working as a revision of the King James Version. Published by Thomas Nelson, the complete NKJV was released in 1982. With regard to its textual basis, the NKJV relies on a modern critical edition (the Biblia Hebraica Stuttgartensia) for the Old Testament, while opting to use the Textus Receptus for the New Testament. (Note: Footnotes are provided regarding textual variants found in the Nestle–Aland Novum Testamentum Graece and the Majority Text.)

The NKJV is described by Thomas Nelson as being "scrupulously faithful to the original [King James Version], yet truly updated to enhance its clarity and readability."

== History ==
The text of the New Testament was published in 1979; the Psalms in 1980; and the full Bible in 1982. The project took seven years in total to complete. A minor revision was completed in 1984.

== Translation philosophy ==
The Executive Editor of the NKJV, Arthur L. Farstad, addressed textual concerns in a book explaining the NKJV translation philosophy. He defended the Majority Text (also called the Byzantine text-type) and claimed that the Textus Receptus is inferior to the Majority Text, but he noted (p. 114) that the NKJV references significant discrepancies among text types in its marginal notes: "None of the three [textual] traditions on every page of the New Testament [...] is labeled 'best' or 'most reliable.' The reader is permitted to make up his or her own mind about the correct reading."

== Circulation ==
The NKJV translation has become one of the best-selling Bibles in the US. In 2024, it was listed as the fifth best-selling Bible by the Evangelical Christian Publishers Association.

An unabridged audiobook version called "The Word of Promise Audio Bible" has been produced by the publisher. It is narrated by celebrities and fully dramatized with music and sound effects.

Gideons International, an organization that places Bibles in hotels and hospitals, at one stage used the NKJV translation along with the KJV, offering the KJV as the default translation and offering the NKJV when an organization asked for a Bible in newer English to be used. After HarperCollins' acquisition of Thomas Nelson, however, the Gideons have chosen to start using the English Standard Version (ESV) instead of the NKJV.

== See also ==
- Modern English Bible translations
