= Bible concordance =

Verbal index to the Bible

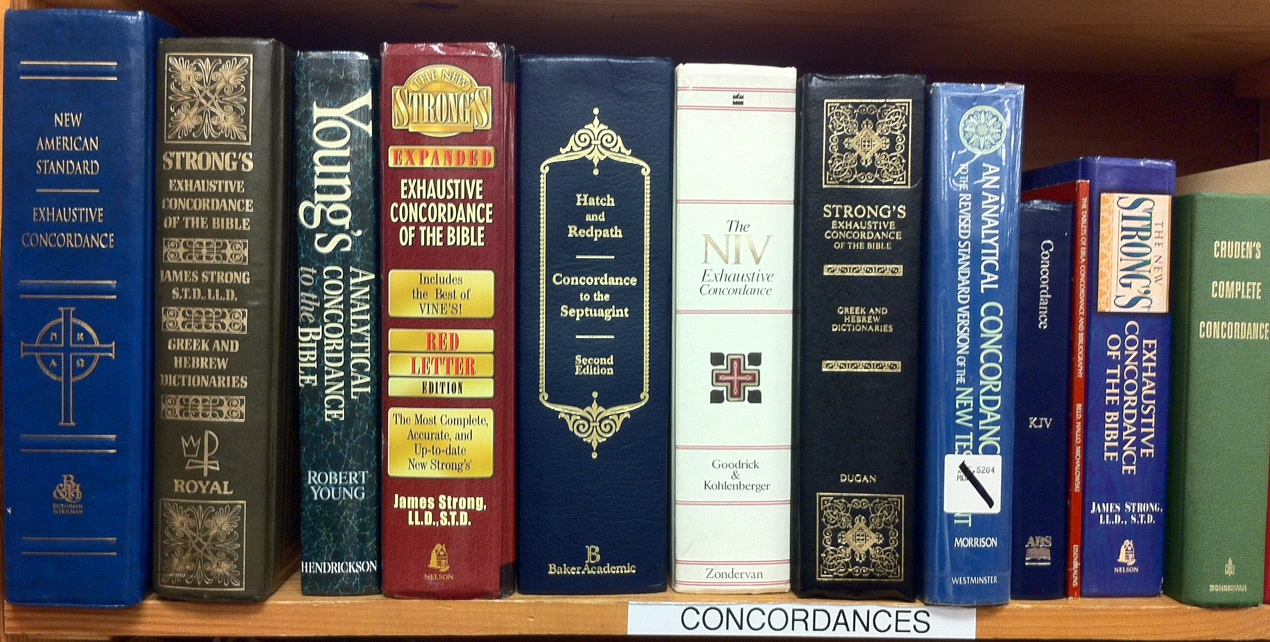
Concordances for the Bible

A Bible concordance is a concordance, or verbal index, to the Bible. A simple form lists Biblical words alphabetically, with indications to enable the inquirer to find the passages of the Bible where the words occur.

Concordances may be for the original languages of the Biblical books, or (more commonly) they are compiled for translations.

== Latin ==
Friars of the Dominican order invented the verbal concordance of the Bible. As the basis of their work they used the text of the Vulgate, the standard Bible of the Middle Ages in Western Europe. The first concordance, completed in 1230, was undertaken under the guidance of Cardinal Hugo de Saint-Cher (Hugo de Sancto Charo), assisted by fellow Dominicans.

It contained short quotations (see Saint-Omer, Bibliothèque municipale, p. 28) of the passages where a word was found. These were indicated by book and chapter (the division into chapters had recently been made by Stephen Langton) but not by verses, which Robert Estienne would first introduce in 1545. In lieu of verses, Hugo divided each chapter into seven almost equal parts, indicated by the letters of the alphabet, a, b, c, etc.

Three English Dominicans (1250–1252) added the complete quotations of the passages indicated. Due to lack of space, present-day concordances do not aim for this completeness of quotation; it is likely, therefore, that the passages indicated were far fewer than those found in a complete concordance of today. The work was somewhat abridged, by retaining only the essential words of a quotation, in the 1310 concordance of Conrad of Halberstadt, another Dominican – his work obtained great success on account of its more convenient form.

The first concordance to be printed appeared in 1470 at Strasburg, and reached a second edition in 1475. The larger work from which it was abridged was printed at Nuremberg in 1485. Another Dominican, John Stoicowic (also known as John of Ragusa), finding it necessary in his controversies to show the Biblical usage of nisi, ex, and per, which were omitted from the previous concordances, began (c. 1435) the compilation of nearly all the indeclinable words of Latin scripture; the task was completed and perfected by others and finally added as an appendix to the concordance of Conrad of Halberstadt in the work of Sebastian Brant published at Basle in 1496. Brant's work was frequently republished and in various cities. It served as the basis of the concordance published in 1555 by Robert Estienne. Estienne added proper names, supplied omissions, mingled the indeclinable words with the others in alphabetical order, and gave the indications to all passages by verse as well as by chapter, bringing his work much closer to the present model of concordances. Since then many different Latin concordances have been published:

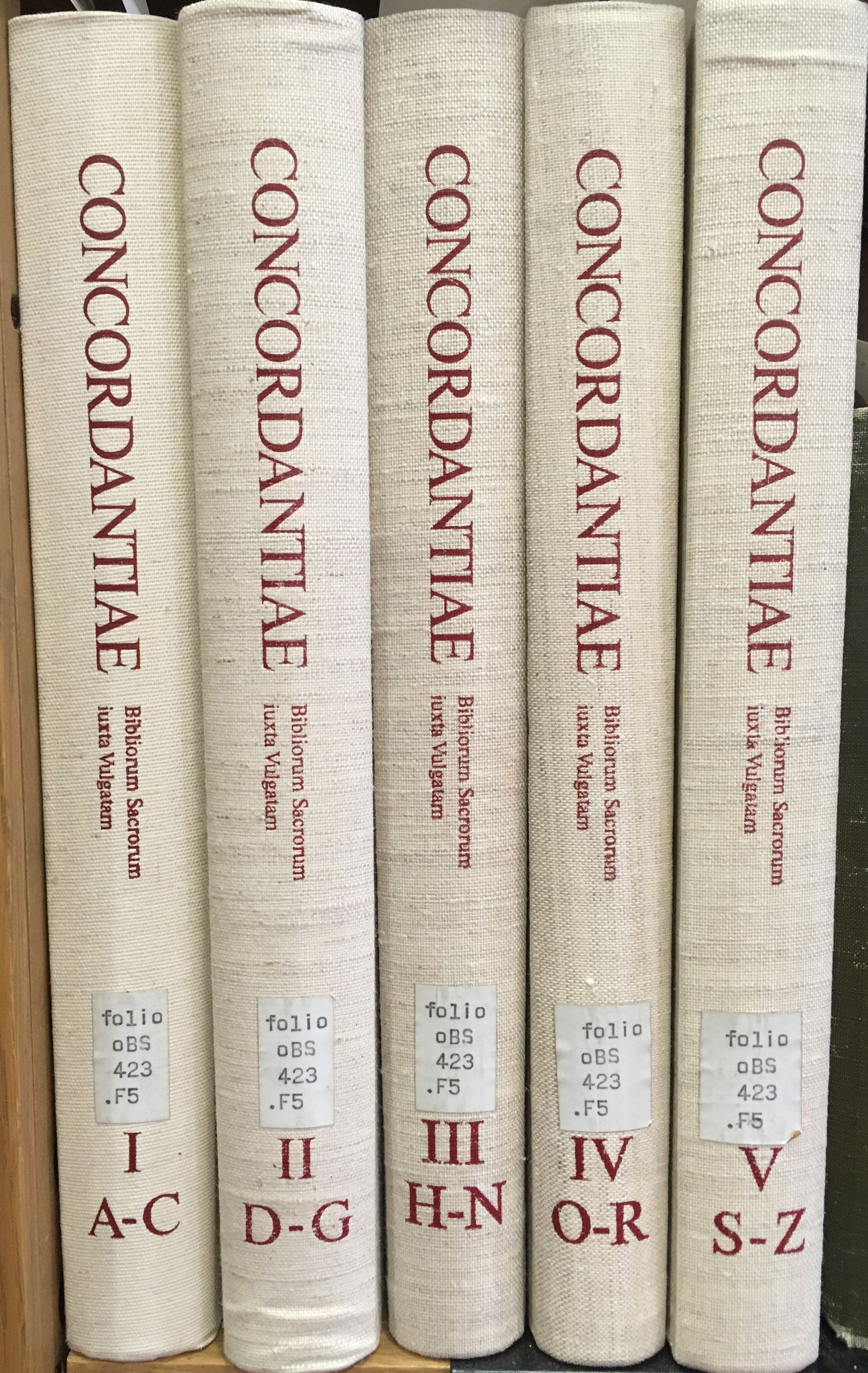
Five-volume concordance to the Latin Vulgate Bible

- Plantinus's "Concordantiæ Bibliorum juxta recognitionem Clementinam" (Antwerp, 1599), which was the first made according to the authorized Latin text;
- "Repertorium Biblicum ... studio ... Patrum Ordinis S. Benedicti, Monasterii Wessofontani" (Augsburg, 1751)
- "Concordantiæ Script. Sac.", by Dutripon, in two immense volumes, the most useful of all Latin concordances, which gives enough of every text to make complete sense (Paris, 1838; seventh ed. 1880)
- an edition of the same by G. Tonini, at Prato, 1861, recognized as nearly complete
- V. Coornaert's Concordantiae librorum Veteris et Novi Testamenti Domini Nostri Jesu Christi juxta Vulgatam editionem, jussu Sixti V, Pontificis Maximi, recognitam ad usum praedicatorum, intended for the use of preachers (Bruges, 1892)
- the "Concordantiarum S. Scripturæ Manuale", by H. de Raze, Ed. de Lachaud, and J.-B. Flandrin (13th ed., Paris, 1895), which gives rather a choice of texts than a complete concordance
- "Concordantiarum Universæ Scripturæ Sacræ Thesaurus", by Fathers Peultier, Etienne, and Gantois (Paris, 1902)

Peter Mintert's "Lexicon Græco-Latinum" of the New Testament is a concordance as well as a lexicon, giving the Latin equivalent of the Greek and, in the case of Septuagint words, the Hebrew equivalent also (Frankfort, 1728).

== Hebrew ==
The first Hebrew concordance (Meïr Netib) was the work of Isaac Nathan ben Kalonymus, begun in 1438 and finished in 1448. It was inspired by the Latin concordances to aid in defence of Judaism, and was printed in Venice in 1523. An improved edition of it by a Franciscan friar, Mario di Calasio, was published in 1621 and 1622 in four volumes. Both these works were several times reprinted, while another Hebrew concordance of the sixteenth century, by Elias Levita, said to surpass Nathan's in many respects, remained in manuscript.

Nathan and Calasio arranged the words according to the Hebrew roots, the derivatives following simply according to the order in which they occur in the Hebrew books; the Buxtorfs, father and son, introduced order into the derivatives by a grammatical classification of the verbs and nouns. Their work (Basle, 1632) also contained many new words and passages previously omitted, and an appendix of all the Aramaic words in the Hebrew Bible; Baer's edition of Buxtorf (1847) added certain particles.

Fürst's concordance (Leipzig, 1840) was for a long time the standard. It corrected Buxtorf and brought it nearer to completeness, printed all Hebrew words with the vowel-points, and perfected the order of the derivatives. Every word is explained in Hebrew and Latin. Fürst excludes, however, the proper nouns, the pronouns, and most of the indeclinable particles, and makes many involuntary omissions and errors; his classification of roots is, according to the Catholic Encyclopedia (1913), sometimes fanciful. "The Englishman's Hebrew and Chaldaic Concordance" (London, 1843; third edition, 1866) is still considered very useful by the same.

A comprehensive Hebrew concordance is that of Salomon Mandelkern (Leipzig, 1896), who rectified the errors of his predecessors and supplied omitted references. Though his own work has been shown to be frequently imperfect, still it is almost complete. An abridged edition of it was published in 1900.

A New Concordance of the Bible (full title A New Concordance of the Bible: Thesaurus of the Language of the Bible, Hebrew and Aramaic, Roots, Words, Proper Names Phrases and Synonyms) by Avraham Even-Shoshan is a concordance of the Hebrew text of the Hebrew Bible, first published in 1977. The source text used is that of the Koren edition of 1958.

== Greek Septuagint ==
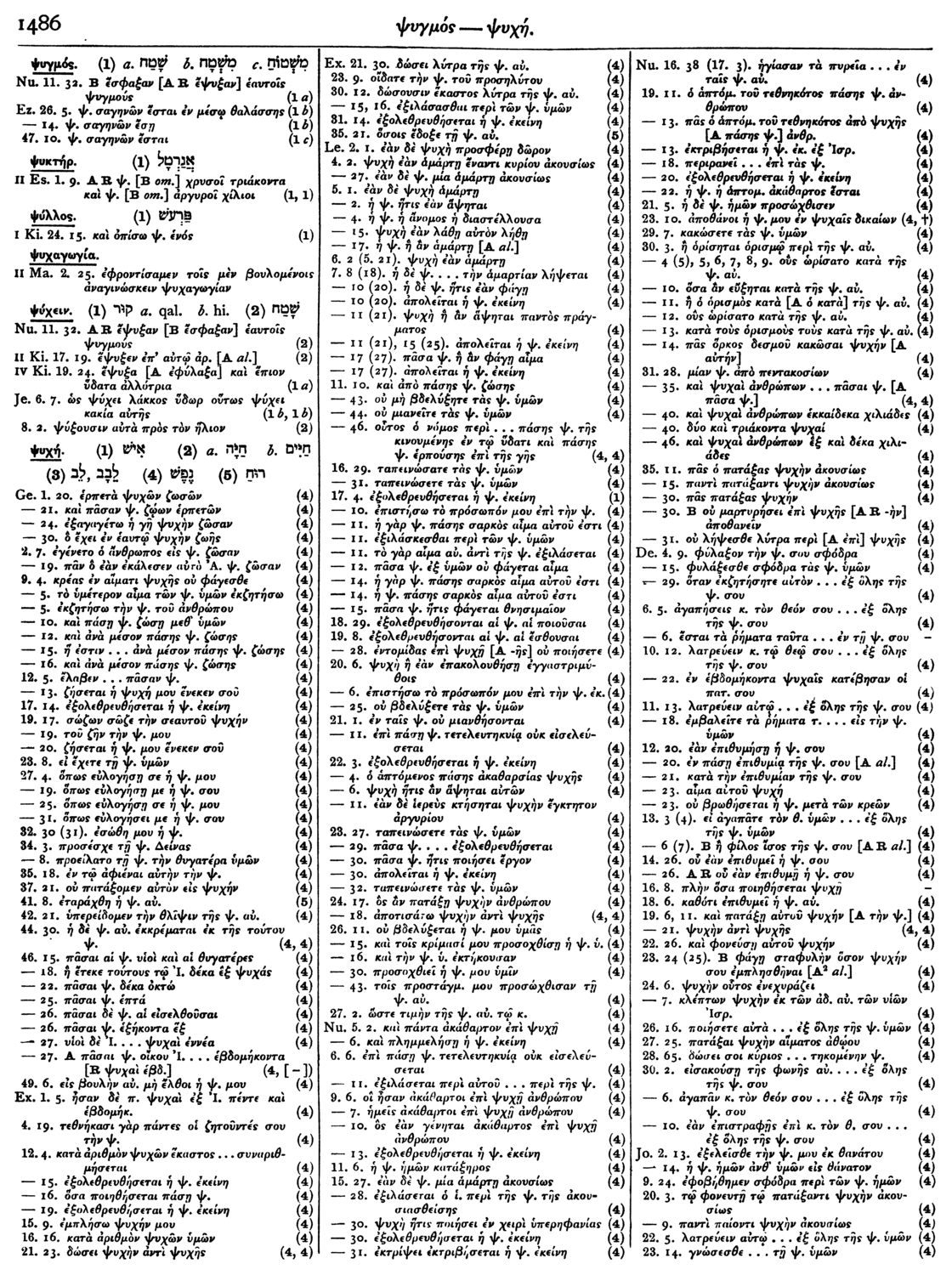
A page from the Hatch-Redpath Concordance

The first was that of Conrad Kircher (Frankfort, 1607); Tromm's, published at Amsterdam, 1718, had reference not only to the Septuagint, but also to the versions of Aquila, Symmachus, and Theodotion. It remained the standard until it gave way to Edwin Hatch and Henry Adeney Redpath's "Concordance to the Septuagint and other Greek Versions of the Old Testament" (Oxford, 1892–1897). This includes a concordance to the deutero-canonical books and the Old Testament Apocrypha, and to the remains of the versions which form part of Origen of Alexandria's Hexapla. The Hebrew equivalents of the Greek, when known, are also given. References to proper names are added in a supplement published in 1900. Bagster's "Handy Concordance to the Septuagint" (London, 1887) gives simply the references, without quotations.

== Greek New Testament ==
The earliest concordances to the Greek New Testament are those of Birken or Betulius (Basle, 1546), Henry Estienne (Paris, 1594), and Erasmus Schmid (Wittenberg, 1638), whose work was twice revised and republished. During the latter half of the nineteenth century the standard New Testament concordance was that of Bruder (Leipzig, 1842; 4th ed., 1888). Its main defect is that it was practically based on the textus receptus, though it aims, in its latest editions to give also the chief variants.

Moulton and Geden's Concordance to the Greek Testament, according to the text of Westcott and Hort, Tischendorf, and the English Revisers (Edinburgh and New York, 1897) includes all the marginal readings. In the case of a reading being in dispute among these authorities, the fact is pointed out. The Hebrew equivalents of all quotations in the N. T. are given; the relation of the Greek N. T. words to the Septuagint and other O. T. Greek versions, as well as to classical usage, is indicated. Two other concordances are The Englishman's Greek Concordance to the New Testament by G. V. Wigram (London, 1839, 2d ed. 1844), and Hudson's Critical Greek and English Concordance of the N. T. (Boston, 1875), which contains references to the chief variant readings.

== Syriac ==
Charles Schaaf's "Lexicon Syriacum" (Leyden, 1709) practically serves the purpose of a concordance to the Peshito version.

== English ==
The earliest concordances in English were published in the middle of the sixteenth century, the first by Thomas Gybson in 1535 (for the New Testament only), and the second in 1550 by John Marbeck. In 1589, Two Right Profitable and Fruitfull Concordances was published by the Queen's printer, Christopher Barker, with royal endorsement centralizing the English biblical concordance form. This work was regularly bound in to the rear of bibles printed in England from the mid-16th to early-17th century and remained the prevalent English concordance throughout this period, going through approximately thirty-one printings between 1589 and 1615. Prior to its retirement, a concordance by William Knight appeared in 1610, though this received only one printing. It was not until 1622 that a widely popular substitute arose, when the theologian Clement Cotton authored a revised concordance to the New Testament. This was followed by an expanded edition covering the Old and New Testaments in 1627, which was further enlarged to include the Apocrypha in 1635. In the same period, John Downame published a shorter Briefe Concordance in 1630, which was later expanded through subsequent editions. Both Cotton and Downame's concordances remained in regular print throughout the following decades, though were joined increasingly by alternate versions from the mid-1640s on.

The early eighteenth century saw the publication of the most famous English concordance, Cruden's Concordance, by Alexander Cruden. First published in 1738, it reached several editions in his own lifetime and has been re-edited, abridged and reprinted repeatedly. Cruden's work is not a complete concordance, and omits especially many references to proper names, but his last edition had a concordance to the deuterocanonical books of the Old Testament, which, however, is usually not reprinted.

It was surpassed by three major concordances of the King James Version of the Bible, those of Robert Young, James Strong, and Walker. Others also followed.

- Young's Analytical Concordance to the Bible (Edinburgh, 1879–1984), an almost complete concordance, indicates the Hebrew, Chaldaic, or Greek original of the English word, and distinguishes the various meanings that may underlie the same word.
- Strong's Concordance has reference only to the English text. It contains also a comparative concordance between the Authorized and Revised English versions, useful for a study of the changes introduced.
- Walker's Comprehensive Concordance to the Holy Scriptures (Boston, 1894) is an almost complete concordance.
- A Complete Concordance to the Revised Version of the New Testament, by J. A. Thoms, was published in London, 1884.
- The New Combined Bible Dictionary and Concordance by Charles F. Pfeiffer. 1965. Grand Rapids, Michigan: Baker Book House.

These were followed by a concordance based on the Douay–Rheims translation of the Bible preferred by Roman Catholics, A Textual Concordance of the Holy Scriptures by Father Thomas David Williams, 1942.

== Contemporary use ==
Since software has made the Bible available in electronic form and with thorough electronic indexes, hard-copy printed concordances have less application. Most scholars and Bible students rely instead on software.

Due to Strong's numbers (see Strong's Concordance) it became possible to translate concordances from one language into another. Thus, the Russian concordance of 30,000 words from the Russian Thompson Study Bible ("Новая учебная Библия Томпсона", La Buona Novella Inc, 2010, edition made by Christian society "The Bible for everyone", Saint Petersburg, Russia) is a translation of the English concordance from Thompson Chain-Reference Bible (The New Thompson Study Bible. La Buona Novella Inc. & B. B. Kirkbride Bible Company, Inc., 2006). In the process of compiling the Russian concordance, the Hebrew/Greek word corresponding to the English concordance word was found, and then its Russian equivalent in the Russian Synodal translation of the Bible was added to the resulting Russian concordance text.

== See also ==
- Concordance (publishing)
- Nave's Topical Bible
- Even-Shoshan concordance, Hebrew
- Hypertext, which Bible concordances predate as a form of hyperlinked literature
- Concordant Version
- Wikisource:Englishman's Concordance
