= Young's Literal Translation =

1862 translation of the Bible into English

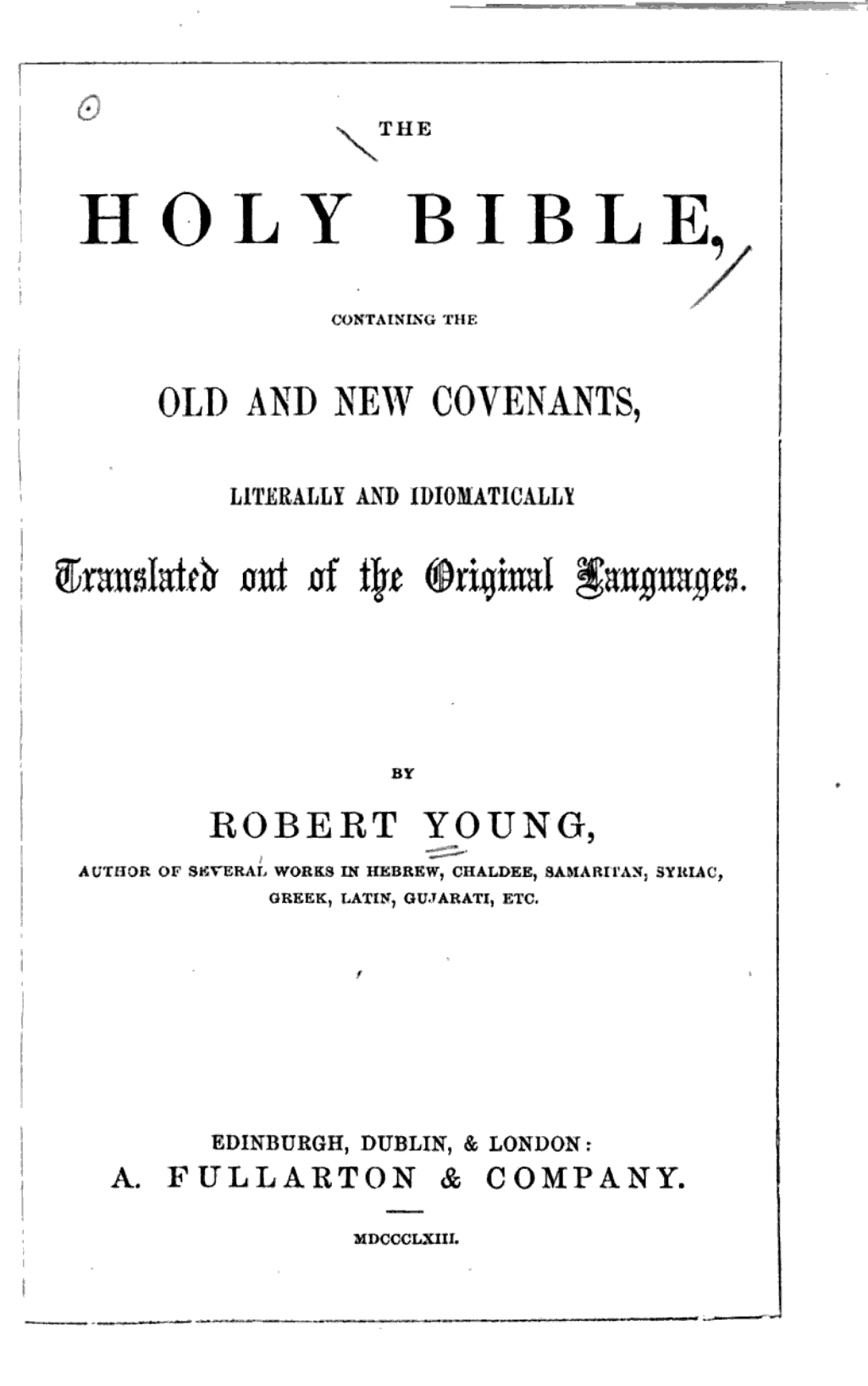
- Title page of the first edition.
- Full name: 1st ed.: The Holy Bible, Containing the Old and New Covenants, Literally and Idiomatically Translated out of the Original Languages 3rd ed.: The Holy Bible, Consisting of the Old and New Covenants, Translated According to the Letter and Idioms of the Original Languages.
- Abbreviation: YLT
- Complete Bible published: 1862
- Translation type: literal
- Copyright: Public domain
- Genesis 1:1–3 In the beginning of God's preparing the heavens and the earth—the earth hath existed waste and void, and darkness on the face of the deep, and the Spirit of God fluttering on the face of the waters, and God saith, "Let light be;" and light is. John 3:16 For God did so love the world, that His Son—the only begotten—He gave, that every one who is believing in him may not perish, but may have life age-enduring.

Young's Literal Translation (YLT) is a translation of the Bible into English, published in 1862. The translation was made by Robert Young, compiler of Young's Analytical Concordance to the Bible and Concise Critical Comments on the New Testament. Young used the Textus Receptus (TR) and the Masoretic Text (MT) as the basis for his translation. He wrote in the preface to the first edition, "It has been no part of the Translator's plan to attempt to form a New Hebrew or Greek Text—he has therefore somewhat rigidly adhered to the received ones." Young produced a "Revised Version" of his translation in 1887, but he stuck with the Received Text. He wrote in the preface to the Revised Edition, "The Greek Text followed is that generally recognized as the 'Received Text,' not because it is thought perfect, but because the department of Translation is quite distinct from that of textual criticism, and few are qualified for both. If the original text be altered by a translator, (except he give his reasons for and against each emendation,) the reader is left in uncertainty whether the translation given is to be considered as that of the old or of the new reading." A new Revised Edition was released ten years after Robert Young's death on October 14, 1888. The 1898 version was based on the TR, easily confirmed by the word "bathe" in Revelation 1:5 and the word "again" in Revelation 20:5. The "Publishers' Note to the Third Edition" explains, "The work has been subjected to a fresh revision, making no alteration on the principles on which the Translation proceeds, but endeavouring to make it as nearly perfect in point of accuracy on its present lines as possible." A major revision of Young's Literal Translation in contemporary English, called the Literal Standard Version, was released in 2020.

== Translation philosophy ==
The Literal Translation is, as the name implies, a very literal translation of the original Hebrew and Greek texts. The Preface to the Second Edition states:

If a translation gives a present tense when the original gives a past, or a past when it has a present; a perfect for a future, or a future for a perfect; an a for a the, or a the for an a; an imperative for a subjunctive, or a subjunctive for an imperative; a verb for a noun, or a noun for a verb, it is clear that verbal inspiration is as much overlooked as if it had no existence. THE WORD OF GOD IS MADE VOID BY THE TRADITIONS OF MEN. [Emphases in original.]

Therefore, Young used the present tense in many places in which other translations use the past tense, particularly in narratives. For example, the YLT version of Genesis begins as follows:

^{1}In the beginning of God's preparing the heavens and the earth—
^{2}the earth hath existed waste and void, and darkness on the face of the deep, and the Spirit of God fluttering on the face of the waters,
^{3}and God saith, 'Let light be;' and light is.
^{4}And God seeth the light that it is good, and God separateth between the light and the darkness,
^{5}and God calleth to the light 'Day,' and to the darkness He hath called 'Night;' and there is an evening, and there is a morning—day one.
^{6}And God saith, 'Let an expanse be in the midst of the waters, and let it be separating between waters and waters.'
^{7}And God maketh the expanse, and it separateth between the waters which under the expanse, and the waters which above the expanse: and it is so.
^{8}And God calleth to the expanse 'Heavens;' and there is an evening, and there is a morning—day second.
^{9}And God saith, 'Let the waters under the heavens be collected unto one place, and let the dry land be seen:' and it is so.
^{10}And God calleth to the dry land 'Earth,' and to the collection of the waters He hath called 'Seas;' and God seeth that good.
^{11}And God saith, 'Let the earth yield tender grass, herb sowing seed, fruit-tree (whose seed in itself) making fruit after its kind, on the earth:' and it is so.
^{12}And the earth bringeth forth tender grass, herb sowing seed after its kind, and tree making fruit (whose seed in itself) after its kind; and God seeth that good;
^{13}and there is an evening, and there is a morning—day third.

Young's Literal Translation in the 1898 edition also consistently renders the Hebrew tetragrammaton (divine name) throughout the Old Testament as "Jehovah", instead of the traditional practice of representing the tetragrammaton in English as "LORD" in small capitals, but editions prior to 1898 do say "LORD" in small capitals.

== Assessment ==
Young's translation is closer to the Hebrew than the better-known versions of this passage in English. The Revised Standard Version (RSV), which is based on Biblia Hebraica Stuttgartensia, for example, treats verses 1–3 in this way:

^{1}In the beginning God created the heavens and the earth.
^{2}The earth was without form and void, and darkness was upon the face of the deep; and the Spirit of God was moving over the face of the waters.
^{3}And God said, "Let there be light"; and there was light.

Young's usage of English present tense rather than past tense has been supported by scholars ranging from the medieval Jewish rabbi Rashi (who advised, "[If] you are going to interpret [this passage] in its plain sense, interpret it thus: At the beginning of the creation of heaven and earth, when the earth was (or the earth being) unformed and void [...] God said, 'Let there be light.'") to Richard Elliott Friedman in his translation of the Pentateuch in The Bible with Sources Revealed (2002).

The translation is not perfectly literal. It renders one passage as "And on the first of the Sabbaths" while it translates another as "And on the first of the week" even though the two phrases are identical in the Greek texts. To quote the preface, "Every effort has been made to secure a comparative degree of uniformity in rendering the original words and phrases. Thus, for example, the Hebrew verb nathan (נתן "give, put, set, etc."), which is rendered by the King James' translators in sixty-seven different ways... has been restricted and reduced to ten, and so with many others. It is the Translator's ever-growing conviction, that even this smaller number may be reduced still further." David Dewey, in A User's Guide to Bible Translations, mentions that Young's "method of translating Hebrew tenses makes his Old Testament in places virtually unreadable."

=== Eternity or age ===
Another important feature of YLT is its treatment of the Hebrew word עוֹלָם (olam) and the Greek word aeon (aiṓn). These two words have basically the same meaning, and YLT translates them and their derivatives as "age" or "age-enduring". Other English versions most often translate them to indicate eternality (eternal, everlasting, forever, etc.). However, there are notable exceptions to this in all major translations, such as: "I am with you always, to the end of the age" (NRSV), the word "age" being a translation of aiṓn. Rendering aiṓn to indicate eternality in this verse would result in the contradictory phrase "end of eternity", so the question arises whether it should ever be so. Proponents of universal reconciliation point out that this has significant implications for soteriology and the problem of hell. However, "age" and "age-enduring" imply indeterminacy which may be either timeless and atemporal or pertaining to an indefinite period of time, the former (but not the latter) meaning having been acquired by the words "eternity" and "eternal".

While it has been argued that "eternity" and "eternal" also have other meanings including "endless period of time" and "endless in time" respectively, this is rarely the case in late antique texts, where the word aidiois would be used to designate endless duration.

Compare the following passages, quoted from YLT with words corresponding to "age" or "age-enduring" emphasised:

^{25}And to Him who is able to establish you, according to my good news, and the preaching of Jesus Christ, according to the revelation of the secret, in the times of the ages having been kept silent,
^{26}and now having been made manifest, also, through prophetic writings, according to a command of the age-enduring God, having been made known to all the nations for obedience of faith—
^{27}to the only wise God, through Jesus Christ, to him [be] glory to the ages. Amen.

— Romans 16:25–27

^{9}who did save us, and did call with an holy calling, not according to our works, but according to His own purpose and grace, that was given to us in Christ Jesus, before the times of the ages,

— 2 Timothy 1:9

^{16}for God did so love the world, that His Son—the only begotten—He gave, that every one who is believing in him may not perish, but may have life age-enduring.

— John 3:16

^{2}upon hope of life age-enduring, which God, who doth not lie, did promise before times of ages,

— Titus 1:2

^{4}who did give himself for our sins, that he might deliver us out of the present evil age, according to the will of God even our Father,
^{5}to whom [is] the glory to the ages of the ages. Amen.

— Galatians 1:4–5

^{13}And mayest Thou not lead us to temptation, but deliver us from the evil, because Thine is the reign, and the power, and the glory—to the ages. Amen.

— Matthew 6:13

^{32}And whoever may speak a word against the Son of Man it shall be forgiven to him, but whoever may speak against the Holy Spirit, it shall not be forgiven him, neither in this age, nor in that which is coming.

— Matthew 12:32

^{46}And these shall go away to punishment age-enduring, but the righteous to life age-enduring.

— Matthew 25:46

^{33}and he shall reign over the house of Jacob to the ages; and of his reign there shall be no end.

— Luke 1:33

^{30}who may not receive back manifold more in this time, and in the coming age, life age-enduring.

— Luke 18:30

== See also ==
- Geneva Bible
- Green's Literal Translation
- Julia E. Smith Parker Translation
- Literal Standard Version
- Tyndale Bible
