= Anthony Thysius the Younger =

Dutch jurist, historian, librarian and rhetorician (1603-1665)

- Born: 1603
- Died: 25 January 1665 (aged 61–62); Leiden
- Occupation: University teacher, jurist, philologist
- Employer: Leiden University

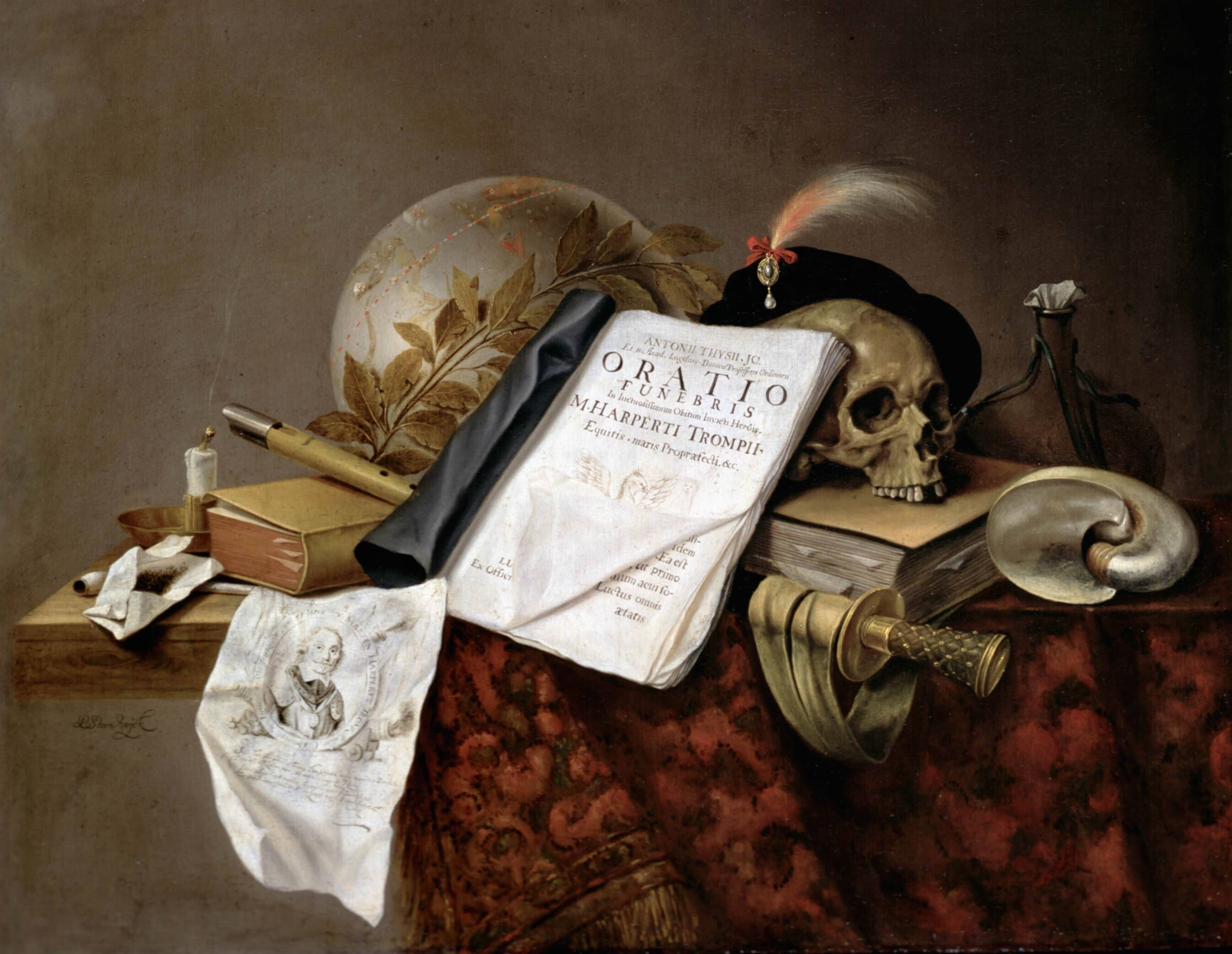
Pieter Steenwijck, Allegory of Death of Tromp, showing the funeral eulogy (Oratio funebris) composed by Thysius for Admiral Maarten Tromp, around 1656. Canvas 79 x 101 cm. Stedelijk Museum De Lakenhal, Leiden.

Antonius Thysius the Younger (c. 1603 – 25 January 1665), also known as Antonius Thysius filius, Antonius Thysius II, or Anthony Thys, was a Dutch jurist, historian, librarian and rhetorician.

== Biography ==
Antonius Thysius the Younger was born in Harderwijk as the son of Antonius Thysius the Elder, who taught theology at the Gymnasium Illustre there. He studied Latin, Greek and Hebrew in Leiden with Daniel Heinsius, Marcus Zuerius van Boxhorn and Constantinus L'Empereur van Oppijck. He then changed his subject to law and graduated as a Doctor of Law on 21 November 1634. On 9 February 1637, he became an associate professor of poetry with special rights. On 21 November 1639, he was also given lectures at the Faculty of Law and on 9 February 1651, he was appointed associate professor of rhetoric.

After becoming assistant at Leiden University Library on 26 August 1653, he became full professor of rhetoric on 8 November 1653 and the fifth librarian of the university library in 1655 as a successor to Daniel Heinsius, in which capacity he reorganised the library. In 1658 he received the honorable appointment of historian of the States of Holland and, after renouncing his special rights, became Associate Professor of Law on 12 November 1663. He was also involved in the management of Leiden University and was rector in 1658/59.

=== Librarian ===
At the end of the tenure of Heinsius as University librarian, the library had descended into chaos. Acquisition had stopped, and its administration was neglected with many books missing, loaned by curators, professors and members of the university council who had possessed a key to the library. Curators then asked young Thysius in 1653 to draw up a new catalogue and rearrange the library. The plutei - subject bookcases with lecterns, chained books and manuscripts - were removed, and bookcases placed against the library walls containing numbered volumes classified according to faculty. Thysius's attempts to oblige all of the printers of the Dutch Republic to send a copy of every new book to the university library failed. However, the rule was locally in Leiden a success. Thysius also managed to purchase books from the estates of scholars like Boxhorn, Claude Saumaise - who had not always been allowed to use the library by Heinsius and had had to buy many books himself - and André Rivet (many heretical Socinian works).

== Work ==
=== Main works ===
- Thysius, Antonius (1639). Exercitationes juridicae. Lugdunum Batavorum (Leiden): Willem Christiaens van der Boxe. OCLC 959414149. 156 pages.
- Thysius, Antonius (1645). Compendium historiae Batavicae a Iulio Caesare usque ad haec tempora [A compendium of Dutch history from Julius Caesar to the present time]. Leiden (Lugdunum Batavorum): Ioannis Maire (Joannes le Maire).
  - Thysius, Antonius (1652). Compendium historiae Batavicae a Iulio Caesare usque ad haec tempora [A compendium of Dutch history from Julius Caesar to the present time]. Leiden (Lugdunum Batavorum): Ioannis Maire (Joannes le Maire). 479 pages.
- Thysius, Antonius. Historia Navalis, sive celeberrimorum proeliorum, quae mari, ab antiquissimis temporibus usque ad Pacem Hispanicam Batavi, foederatique Belgae, ut plurimum victores, gesserúnt, luculenta descriptio. Leiden (Lugdunum Batavorum): Ioannis Maire (Joannes le Maire). OCLC 64965772. 305 pages.
- Thysius, Antonius. Discursus politicus de republica Atheniensium, de Collatio legum Atheniensium et Romanorum legum (in Latin). in Postel, Guilielmus (1645). De republica, seu Magistratibus Atheniensium liber. Ex Musæo Joan. Balesdens, In Principe Senatu Advocati (in Latin). Lugdunum Batavorum (Leiden): Joannes Maire.
- Thysius, Antonius (1646). Antonii Thysii ... Memorabilia celebriorum veterum rerumpublicarum : accessit Tractatus juris publici de potestate principis. Lugdunum Batavorum [Leiden]: Ioannis Maire (Joannes le Maire). OCLC 64328700. 704 pages.

=== Other works ===
- Thysius, Antonius (1639). Exercitationes juridicae. Leiden: Gualterus de Haes (Wouter de Haes). 1639; Wilhelmus Christianus. also with Gronius, Fasciculus quartus opusculorum, Rotterdam 1694.
- Thysius, Antonius (1639). Exercitationes miscellaneae. Leiden: Wilhelmus Christianus. OCLC 13623125.
- Diss. Epist. de iuris studio, Leiden 1639.
- Thysius, Antonius (1640). Discursus juridico-theologicus, licitas esse jure divino comprivignorum nuptias... Leiden: Wilhelmus Christianus. OCLC 67912718.
- Disquisitiones juris publici, Leiden 1641.
- Oratio funebris in obitum Jac. Brouckhoven, Leiden 1642.
- Guilielmi Postelli de Republica seu magistratibus Atheniensium liber, met zijn eigen Discursus politicus de eadem materia, Leiden 1645.
- Thysius, Antonius (1646). Memorabilia celebriorum veterum rerumpublicarum. Tractatus iuris publici de potestate principis. Leiden: Joannis Maire (Joannes le Maire).
- Sallustii Crispi opera, Leiden 1649, 1654, 1659, Leiden; Rotterdam 1665, Leiden 1677, Amsterdam 1689.
- Oratio funebris in mortem viri incomparabilis D. Frederici Spanhemii, Lessus Tunebris, Leiden 1649.
- Justinus, cum selectissimis variorum observationibus, ex accuratâ recessione A.T.J.Cti, Leiden 1650, 1659.
- L. Annaei Senecae Tragoediae, auctore Polydoro Virgilio, Urbinate. Accessit praeter alia nonnulla series Regum Angliae a primis initiis usque ad hanc aetatem. Ex nova editione A.T.J.C., Leiden 1651.
- Valerius Maximus cum selectis variorum observat. et nova recensione A. Thysii. Leiden: Franciscus Hackius. 1651. 1655, Leiden.
- L. Coelii Lactantii Firmani opera, Leiden 1652.
- Oratio funebris in mortem H.M. Tromp, Leiden 1653 (Online)
- Paterculus, Caius Velleius (1653). Thysius, Antonius (ed.). C. Velleius Paterculus : Cum selectis variorum Noti. Historiæ Romanæ lib. 1, 2. Leiden. OCLC 504753840. 388 pages. Also 1668.
- Oratio funebris in obitum D. Heinsii. Leiden: Petrus Leffen. 1655.
  - also Witte, Henning. Memoriae philosophorum. p. 171.
- Oratio funebris in obitum viri clarissimi et praestantissimi Dn. Lamberti Barlaei, Gruec. Litter.-Profess. longedignissimi Leiden 1655; also in Henning Witte: Memoriae philosophorum ("Oratio funebris in obitum viri clarissimi et praestantissimi Dn. Lamberti Barlaei" [Funeral eulogy for the famous and eminent Mr. Lambert van Baerle]. uni-mannheim.de (in Latin). p. 171.)
- Lipsius, Justus; Fabricius, Georg; Thysius, Antoine (1650). Roma illustrata, sive, Antiquitatum Romanarum breviarium: accessit Georgii Fabricii Chemnicensis veteris Romae cum nova collatio : ex nova recensione, Antonii Thysii JC. Leiden: Adriaen Wijngaerden. OCLC 23643529.
- De usura & foenore, ex antiquitate & conciliis & patribus, nec non reformatae religionis publicis privatisque scriptis tractatus posthumus. Trajecti ad Rhenum: Gisberti à Zyll, & Theodori ab Ackersdyck. 1658. OCLC 1337630157. 70 pages.
- Auli Gellii Noctes Atticae; cum selectis novisque commentariis, et accurata recensione Antonii Thysii, j.c. & Jacobi Oisell, j.c. [Attic Night by Aulus Gellius; with selected and new commentaries, and an accurate review by Antonius Thysius, j.c. & Jacobus Oisell, j.c.]. Leiden. 1666. (Online), 1688 (Online)

== Literature ==
- Berkvens-Stevelinck, Christiane (2012). Magna commoditas : Leiden University's great asset : 425 years library collections and services. Translated by UvA Talen, Amsterdam. Leiden: Leiden University Press. pp. 83–87, 106. ISBN 9789087281656. OCLC 794706996.
- Hulshoff Pol, Elfriede (1975). "The Library". In Lunsingh Scheurleer, Th. H.; Posthumus Meyjes, G.H.M.; Bachrach, Alfred Gustave Herbert (eds.). Leiden University in the seventeenth century : an exchange of learning. Leiden: Brill. pp. 430–433, 436, 440, 458. ISBN 9789004042674. OCLC 1676723. 496 pages.
- "Entry". Zedlers Universallexikon. Vol. 43. p. 1043. Title: Thysius, Anton, Rechtsgelehrter und Historicus. In German. Consulted on 29 May 2025.
- Blok, P.J.; Molhuysen, P.C., eds. (1921). "[Thys, Thysius Anthony]". Nieuw Nederlandsch biografisch woordenboek. Deel 5 (1921) (in Dutch).
- van der Aa, Abraham Jacob (1874). "Thysius, Antonius.". Biographisch Woordenboek der Nederlanden. Vol. 18. Haarlem: J. J. van Brederode. p. 116. (Online, in Dutch)
