= Literal Standard Version =

Modern English translation of the Bible

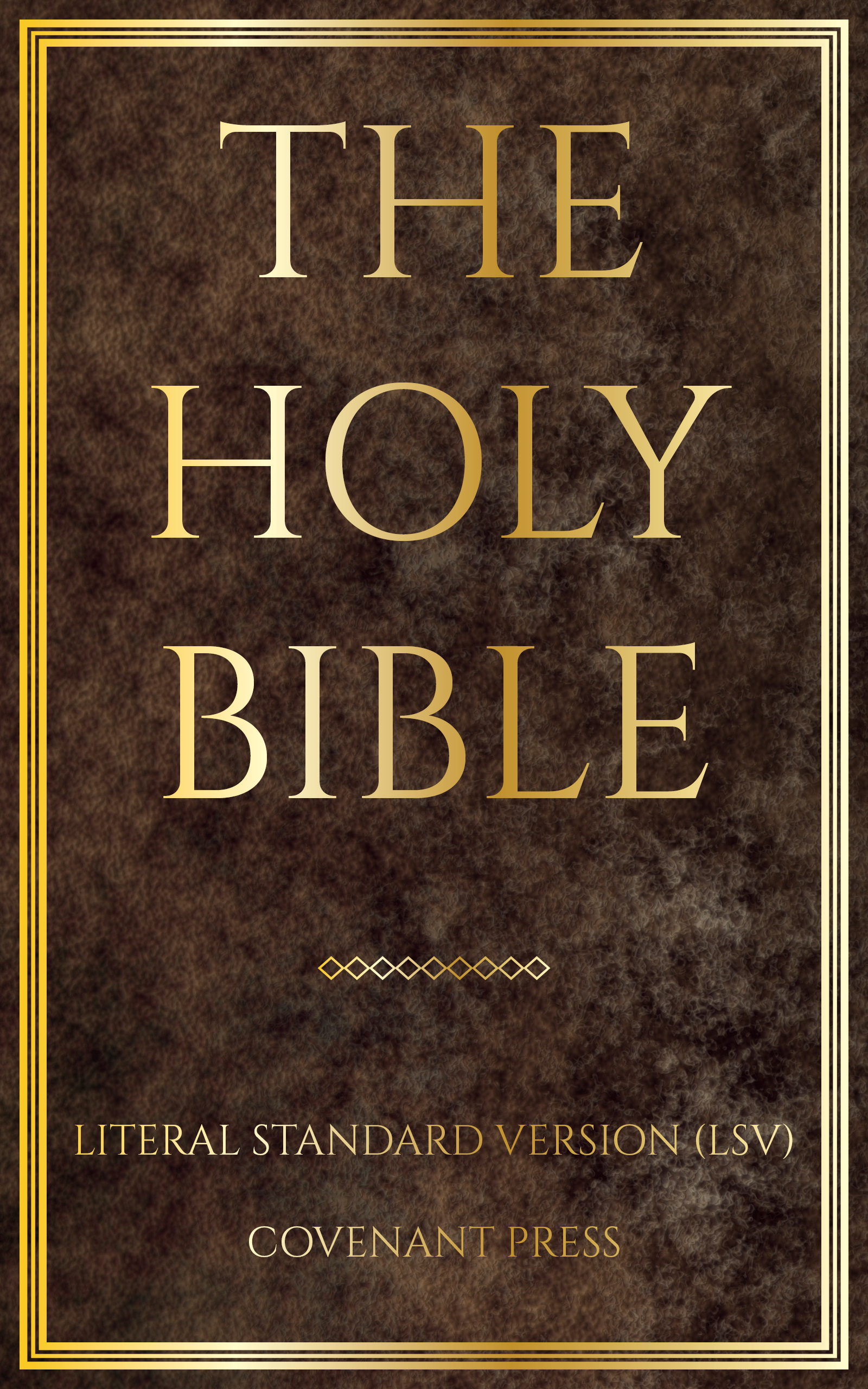
- Full name: Literal Standard Version
- Abbreviation: LSV
- Complete Bible published: 2020
- Online as: Literal Standard Version at Wikisource
- Derived from: YLT
- Textual basis: Masoretic Text, Septuagint, Dead Sea Scrolls, Textus Receptus, other New Testament manuscripts consulted
- Translation type: Formal Equivalence
- Reading level: High School
- Publisher: Covenant Press
- Copyright: Registered Copyright 2020, Covenant Press and the Covenant Christian Coalition; subsequently released under the Creative Commons Attribution-ShareAlike license (CC BY-SA)
- Website: www.lsvbible.com
- Genesis 1:1–3 In [the] beginning God created the heavens and the earth, and the earth was formless and void, and darkness [was] on the face of the deep, and the Spirit of God [was] fluttering on the face of the waters, and God says, “Let light be”; and light is. John 3:16...for God so loved the world that He gave the only begotten Son, that everyone who is believing in Him may not perish, but may have continuous life.

The Literal Standard Version (LSV) is a Modern English translation of the Bible with a number of distinctive features. It describes itself as the most literal translation of the Bible into the modern English language. The first edition was published on February 2, 2020.

== History ==
Work on the Literal Standard Version began in early 2018 with completion of the first edition shortly before its February 2020 publication. U.S. copyright was obtained in January 2020, but the LSV was subsequently released under the Creative Commons Attribution-ShareAlike license (CC BY-SA). The open-ended licensing allows English distribution and translation to be done commercially and non-commercially by other publishers and organizations as long as sufficient attribution is included.

The translation team made the digital version freely available shortly after release. The LSV became available on eBook platforms, such as Kindle, Nook, and Kobo in May 2020.

== Translation philosophy ==
As expounded in the preface, the translators have defined their translation philosophy as follows: "The goal of any good translation is to produce a readable text that preserves the original autographic meaning and comes as close as possible to translating, word-for-word, manuscripts that accurately represent the original writings." Regarding Scripture in general, the translators have taken a conservative approach, adhering to both inerrancy and infallibility, while recognizing that this high view of Scripture ultimately applies only to the original Hebrew, Aramaic, and Greek autographs.

The introduction defines a threefold philosophy that undergirds the translation: "Since context and sentence structure are as vital to translation as capturing the proper meaning of each word, the translators of the LSV have used these three key principles in translation: 1. Preservation of verb tenses, 2. Consistent word-for-word translation, and 3. Preservation of word order when readability is unimpacted, but revised word order when necessary for readability."

== Textual basis ==
The LSV is a major revision of Robert Young's Literal Translation. The Old Testament is based upon the Masoretic Text (MT) with strong influence from the Septuagint (LXX). As an example, the LXX chronology in Genesis is set next to the MT. The Dead Sea Scrolls (DSS) were consulted in places.

The New Testament is based upon the Textus Receptus and Majority Text, although the translators consulted other manuscripts: "in certain, specific instances other manuscript versions and text-types are used where the evidence seems incontrovertible (e.g., the LXX and DSS in the Hebrew and Aramaic; the Alexandrian in the Greek)."

== Distinctive features ==
Like a growing number of translations, the LSV uses a name, rather than a title, in translating the Tetragrammaton. However, the transliterated Tetragrammaton (YHWH) is used instead of Yahweh out of respect for the differing bodies of research on the pronunciation of the unpointed name.

Besides the Tetragrammaton, the two most distinctive features of the LSV include its use of justified text blocks throughout mimicking the style of the ancient manuscripts and as an attempt to regard the entirety of Scripture as equally important, and the use of the caesura mark to distinguish lines of poetic literature.

Given its highly literal nature, the translation has been described as mechanically word-for-word, which inclines it towards a higher reading level, ideal for deeper research into the meaning of the original languages and the study of biblical idioms and intra-biblical cross references, although it is significantly easier to read than Robert Young's 1862 translation.

Similar to the New King James Version, the LSV capitalizes all pronouns and most nouns referring to God, Christ, the Holy Spirit, and the Angel or Messenger of the Lord.

The way in which the LSV handles verb tenses, particularly in regard to the Hebrew Old Testament, is best summarized by the arguments presented in Robert Young's original preface to his 1862 translation.

== Formats ==
The LSV has been released in such formats as paperback, hardcover, Kindle, Nook, Kobo, Apple Book, PDF, EPUB, theWord, inWORD Bible, e-Sword, and MySword, with leather-bound and DBL Paratext-based publications forthcoming. It is also available through numerous Bible apps and online Bible readers, such as Olive Tree, American Bible Society, YouVersion, and Biblica.
