= Even-Shoshan Dictionary =

Hebrew dictionary by Avraham Even-Shoshan

The Hebrew dictionary by Avraham Even-Shoshan, commonly known as the Even-Shoshan Dictionary, was first published (1948–1952) as "מִלּוֹן חָדָשׁ (milon ḥadash, A New Dictionary), later (1966–1970) as הַמִּלּוֹן הֶחָדָשׁ (hamilon heḥadash, The New Dictionary), and finally (2003, well after his death) as מִלּוֹן אֶבֶן־שׁוֹשָׁן (milon even-shoshan, Even-Shoshan Dictionary).

== Contents ==
The Even-Shoshan Dictionary is written fully vowelized, and not just in ktiv maleh, because ktiv maleh may change the meaning slightly. For example, in the word "להניח" ('lehaniach'), if the ה ('heh') has a patach under it, it means "to cause rest;" while if it has a kamatz under it, it means "to place."

The dictionary contains over 70,000 words and includes etymological information, displaying roots and Aramaic, Akkadian, Arabic or Ugaritic cognates.

== Online editions ==
An online edition is available with the application Babylon, and freely through the default Dictionary applications on Apple devices. Google Search used to display Even-Shoshan's dictionary entries when using the defunct "define:" operator: definition of the word עברית.
