= Young's Analytical Concordance to the Bible =

Concordance to the Bible compiled by Robert Young first published in 1879

Young's Analytical Concordance to the Bible is a Bible concordance to the King James Version compiled by Robert Young. First published in 1879, it contains "about 311,000 references subdivided under the Hebrew and Greek originals with the literal meaning and pronunciation of each."

== Purpose ==
A concordance is an index to a book allowing particular references to be found, usually with several words of context for each instance. Bible concordances normally show the individual words of the version being referenced in alphabetical order with the passages showing that word listed in traditional Bible book order. The key word is usually abbreviated to an initial.

Young's Analytical Concordance was the first multilingual concordance to the Bible. Published in 1879, some 268 years after the King James Authorised Version which it indexes, after some 40 years of work including 3 years of typesetting. It was followed in 1894 by Strong's Concordance.

Some Bible concordances are single language, e.g. English only, like Cruden's Concordance to the Bible (the first of its kind). They list the English text alphabetically. Young's Analytical is multilingual because while it lists the English words (and multiple word translations of single words) it also deals with the underlying Biblical Hebrew, Biblical Aramaic and Koine Greek languages.

Young's goal, described in his preface to the first edition, was to enable "the simplest reader to a more correct understanding of the common English Bible, "by a reference to the original words in Hebrew and Greek" referencing William Tyndale to say that " every 'ploughboy' [could] know more of the Scriptures than the 'ancients'". His concordance was designed to be clear and easy to use "at a glance". His aim was that three points would be clearly displayed and easily found for each word:

1. the original Greek or Hebrew word behind the English word used in the passage.
2. the literal or 'primitive' meaning.
3. a list of all the other passages in the English Bible that use this word from that Greek or Hebrew original.

Together this would allow the reader to "distinguish things that differ, which are frequently confounded in the English Bible".

Young saw additional value as he "for the first time inserted in their proper alphabetical order" with an explanation of who or what they are. Later editions of Cruden's which had listed names separately took up this format.

Young's is a complete concordance rather than an exhaustive one like Strong's in that it includes a complete list of all words with a substantive meaning leaving out the most common articles, conjunctions, prepositions and pronouns such as a, and, to, and he". The exhaustive includes all of these putting them in a separate abbreviated index.

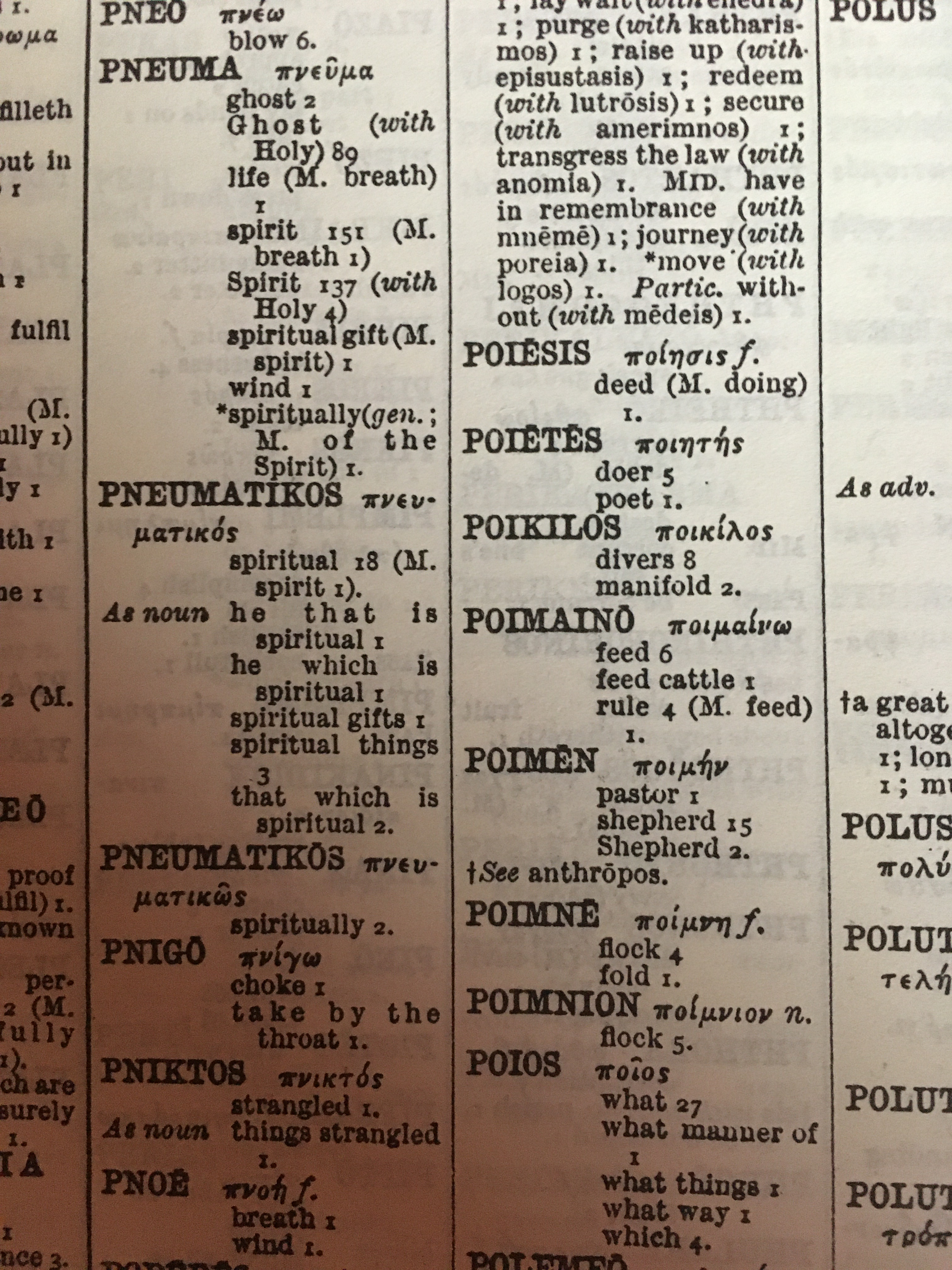
Pneuma and adjacent words in the Index Lexicon to the New Testament

In his later addition William Stevenson, who revised the concordance, added the Index lexicons of the Old and New Testaments by popular request. Specifically designed to facilitate word studies in the original languages they have the transliterated Biblical Hebrew and Aramaic ("Chaldee") words for the Old Testament and the Greek words for the New Testament in alphabetical order, the original script and some grammatical information followed by a vertical list of all the different words used in the English Bible to translate them along with the number of instances. Stevenson explains in his "Explanatory Note" to the Index lexicons that this allows the reader to get a sense of overall meaning of the original word from the range of senses used to translate it and the security of the translation from the number of instances altogether. The editors of the Zondervan NIV Exhaustive Concordance (originally known as the NIV Exhaustive Concordance, 1990) judged that this was a format that "more accurately interrelated the original languages ... and was easier to read [than the Strong style dictionary]".

Young's Analytical Concordance is still in print and over the years and had had over two dozen revisions by 1990

== Contents ==
- "Hints and Helps to Bible Interpretation" (only in some later editions)
- "Analytical Concordance" - Each entry can contain the multiple original language words in the original language and in a phonetic vocalization into English. It also gives the extended meaning and usage of the word in the original language. This is a Bible concordance to the King James Version (KJV) and not a lexicon of the OT Hebrew or NT Greek languages.
- "Index lexicons to the Old and New Testaments, being a guide to parallel passages" prepared by Wm. B. Stevenson.
- The British eighth edition also includes "A complete list of Scripture Proper Names as in the Authorised and Revised Versions, showing their modern pronunciation and the exact form of the original Hebrew" by the same author. This appendix also has an informative introduction.

== Use ==
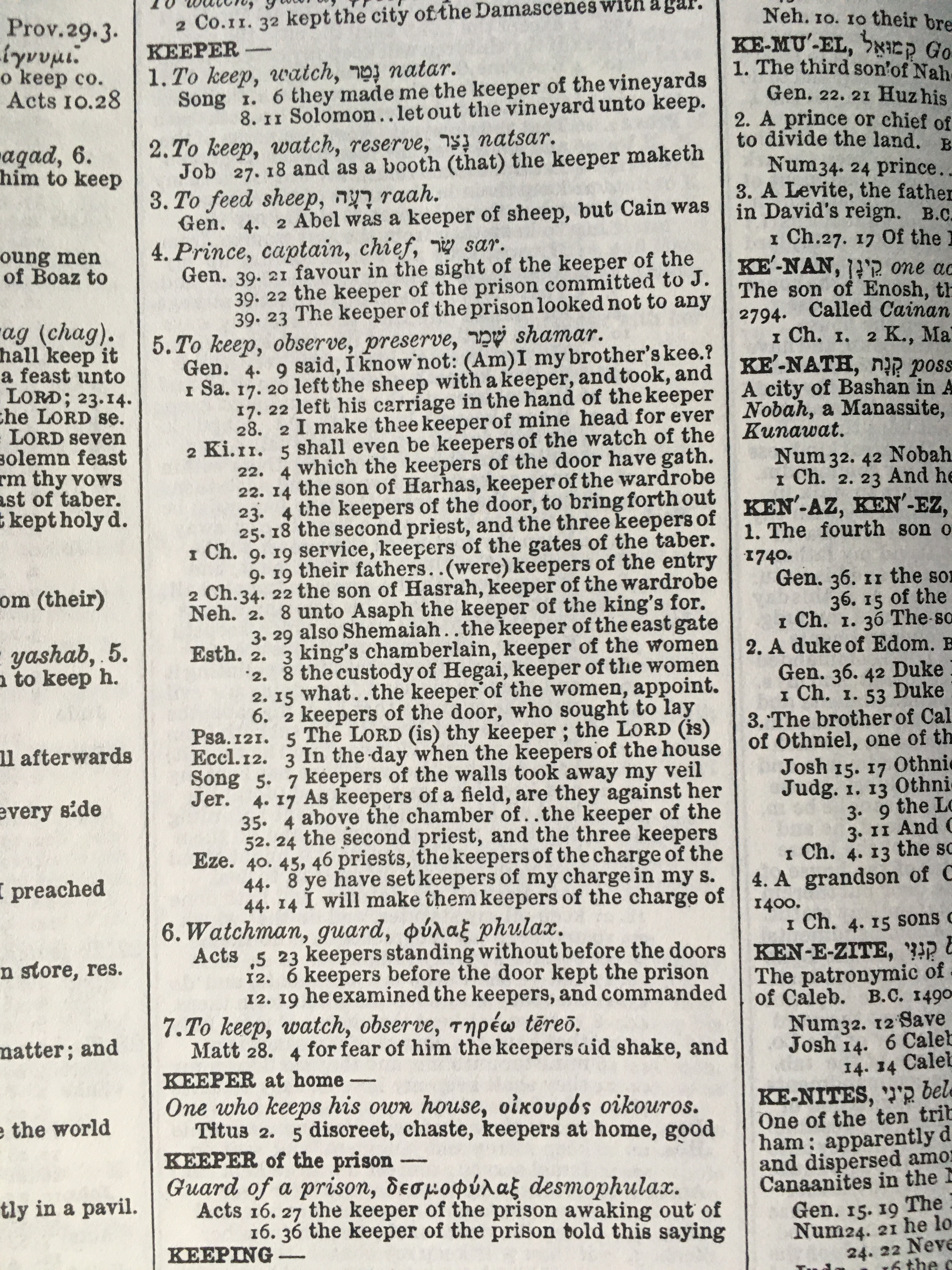
The entry for Keeper in Young's Analytical Concordance showing the breakdown of the English word by the original Hebrew and Greek words translated and the overall presentation.

=== Concordance ===
Whereas in an English only concordance each instance of a word is listed alphabetically without differentiation and in an exhaustive concordance they are listed alphabetically with an identifying number (Strong's Number or GK Number) keyed to a Dictionary Index to identify the original word, in the Analytical Concordance the English words are divided, within the main entry, according to the original word in Greek, Hebrew or Aramaic underlying it. The reader can therefore see at a glance what word was being translated and what other words have been translated with the same English words. At the same time every passage including that English word can be found.

Within each subdivision the word is given as a transliteration and in the original script with a brief definition, what Young called a "literal meaning". The different divisions of the word list for each English word are numbered for easy reference. So the concordance can be used simply to find particular verses containing the key word, or for a more detailed word study from the original language.

=== Index lexicon ===
The Index lexicon (described above) allows for more detailed word studies in the original language and is a valued facility offered by the analytical Concordance. The process of identifying the original Greek or Hebrew word used in the passage being studied and then using the Index lexicon to identify all the other English words used to translate this word is the main advice Harvard Divinity School give to scholars using the concordance. Of course the main concordance then allows each instance of the alternate translations to be found and as Stevenson noted the number of times each English instance is used gives an approximate guide to how well the meaning of a word is understood.

== Editions ==
British editions and American editions are numbered differently.

=== British editions ===
These have the title Analytical Concordance to the Holy Bible.

- First published 1879, followed by editions 2–6.
- Seventh edition published 1900, revised throughout by the Glasgow Professor of Hebrew and Semitic Languages, William Barron Stevenson (1869-1954).

This was reprinted 1904, 1905, 1906, 1909, 1912.
1913 was the first to be published by the Religious Tract Society; Reprinted 1919, 1922, 1924, 1927, 1933, 1935.

- Eighth edition published 1938, revised further by J. H. Young with advice from Stevenson.

This was reprinted 1939, 1943, 1946, 1948, 1949, 1950, 1952, 1956, 1957, 1958, 1961, ..., 1971, 1973, 1977, ...

=== American editions ===
American editions have the title Analytical Concordance to the Bible.

The 20th American edition, first published in 1910, corresponds largely to the British 7th edition revised by W. B. Stevenson, but to which was added a further supplement, entitled A sketch of recent exploration in Bible lands by Thomas Nicol. This was originally published separately some time before its second edition which appeared in 1893.

Later editions include a supplement entitled The Canon of Scripture by R. K. Harrison and Everett F. Harrison added in 1979).

== See also ==
- George Wigram – author of
  - The Englishman's Greek and English Concordance to the New Testament
  - The Englishman's Hebrew and Chaldee Concordance to the Old Testament
- List of biblical names
