= A New Concordance of the Bible =

Concordance of Hebrew text in the Hebrew Bible

A New Concordance of the Bible (full title A New Concordance of the Bible: Thesaurus of the Language of the Bible, Hebrew and Aramaic, Roots, Words, Proper Names Phrases and Synonyms) by Avraham Even-Shoshan is a concordance of the Hebrew text of the Hebrew Bible, first published in 1977. The source text used is that of the Koren edition of 1958.
