= James Strong (theologian) =

American bible scholar and lexicographer

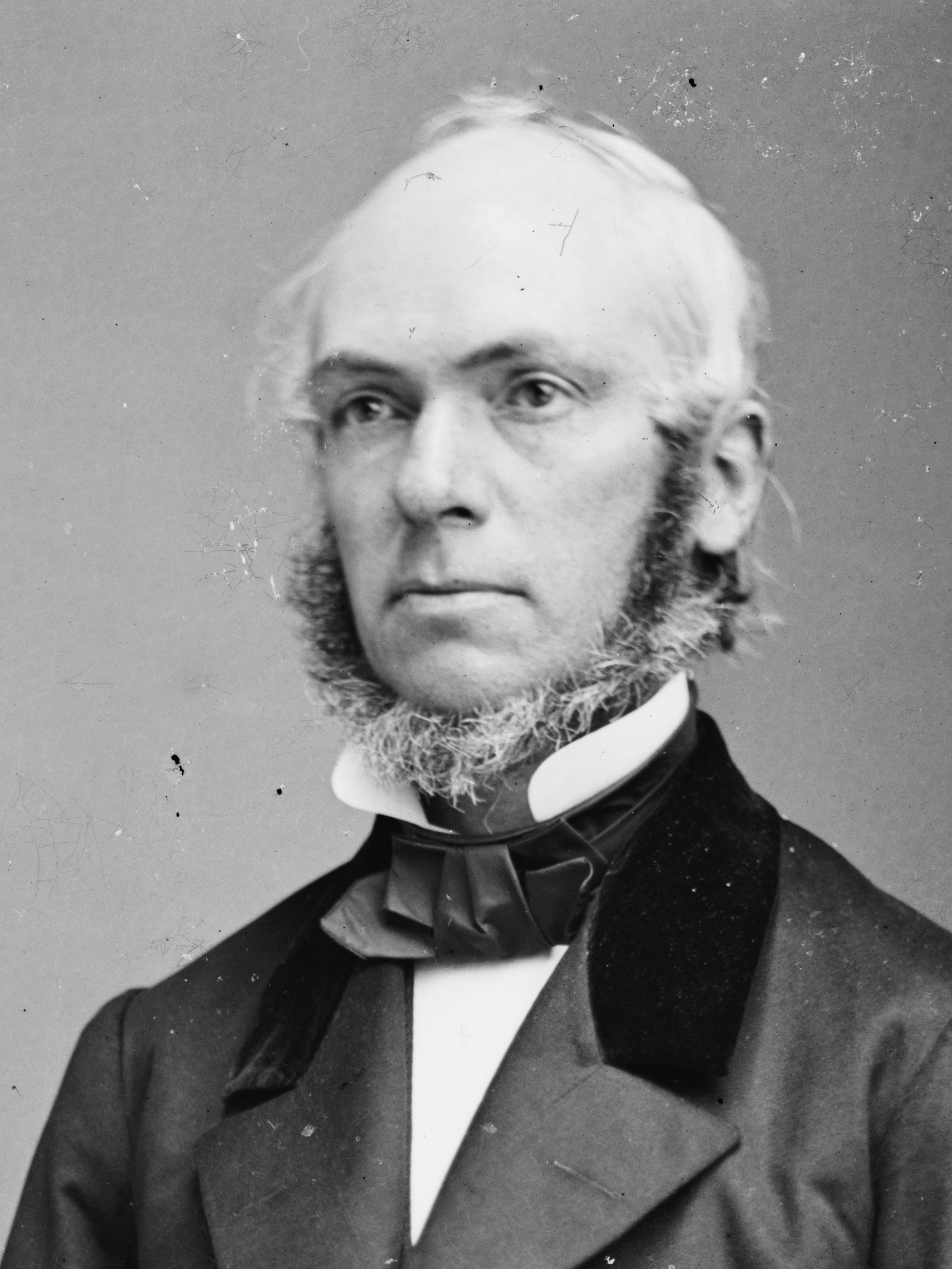
- Born: August 14, 1822; New York City, US
- Died: August 7, 1894 (aged 71); Round Lake, New York, US

Academic background
- Education: Wesleyan University (1844)

Academic work
- Discipline: Biblical studies; Christian theology; Philology
- Institutions: Troy University (New York)
- Notable works: Strong's Concordance (1890)

James Strong (August 14, 1822 – August 7, 1894) was an American academic, biblical scholar, lexicographer, Methodist theologian and professor, best known for being the creator of Strong's Concordance.

== Biography ==
Strong was born in New York City and graduated, in 1844, as valedictorian from Wesleyan University. Subsequently, he was mayor of his hometown on Long Island. Later, having settled in Flushing, New York, he pursued biblical studies, held various local offices, and organized, built, and was the president of the Flushing railroad. In 1856 the Wesleyan University granted him the degree of Doctor of Divinity (D.D.). From 1858 until 1861, Strong was both Acting President and Professor of Biblical Literature at Troy University. In 1868 he became Professor of Exegetical Theology at Drew Theological Seminary, where he remained for twenty-seven years. In 1881 the Wesleyan University honored Strong with the degree of Doctor of Laws (LL.D.). He died at Round Lake, New York, in 1894.

== Strong's Concordance ==
His best known work is the Bible concordance named after him, Strong's Exhaustive Concordance of the Bible, first published in 1890, of which new editions are still in print. Numerous revisions, such as The Strongest Strong's Exhaustive Concordance of the Bible and The New Strong's Exhaustive Concordance of the Bible, along with adaptations of the concordance to translations other than the Authorized King James Version while retaining the "Strong's" or similar branding, such as the Strongest NIV Exhaustive Concordance are also available. "Strong's numbering" of Greek and Hebrew words, have dominated the enumeration of such words in Bible study helps to the present day, only recently being supplemented by Goodrick–Kohlenberger numbering.

For the concordance, Strong numbered every Hebrew or Greek root word which was found, for ease of reference. This numbering system (8674 Hebrew roots and 5523 Greek roots) is now widely used in the English-speaking world and also widely available on the web, where it can be used with many translations, often in conjunction with other hermeneutic tools. In spite of the Greek roots being numbered up to 5624, there are 5523 actual entries, since 101 numbers were jumped over. At the end of the "Greek Dictionary of the New Testament" section of the first edition of Strong's Concordance is the following Note: "Owing to changes in the enumeration while in progress, there were no words left for Nos. 2717 and 3203–3302, which were therefore silently dropped from the vocabulary and references as redundant. This will occasion no practical mistake or inconvenience."

Further, note that modern Old Testament lexical systems often separate entries on Aramaic words from those on Hebrew words, a practice initiated by A Hebrew and English Lexicon of the Old Testament (an English work based on Gesenius' Hebrew Grammar in German), which is commonly called "Brown–Driver–Briggs" or "BDB" after its three primary authors.

== Other works ==
Another major contribution was to the Cyclopædia of Biblical, Theological and Ecclesiastical Literature (10 vols., 1867–81; supplement, 2 vols., 1885–7). Work on this project having begun in 1853, Strong was in charge of the department of Biblical literature, while John McClintock supervised theological and ecclesiastical literature for the preparation of the first few volumes. However, with Dr. McClintock's death in 1870, Strong became sole supervising editor of the project, and with the assistance of J. H. Worman saw the project through to completion.

Mr. Strong was invited by Dr. Philip Schaff to join the Old Testament Company of the American committee of the English Revised Version of the Bible, and worked within that company in preparing both the English and the eventual American revision of the Bible, the American version of which became known as the American Standard Version 1901. The American Revision Committee began work in 1871 and continued to work until 1901. Notable scholars of the day who worked on these two translations with Mr. Strong include F. H. A. Scrivener (who also edited the AV to form the first Cambridge Paragraph Bible, and whose recension of the AV is considered to be the authoritative text), Princeton theologian Charles Hodge, Philip Schaff, F. J. A. Hort and B. F. Westcott (the eponymous Westcott and Hort), W. L. Alexander, A. B. Davidson, S. R. Driver, Joseph Lightfoot, Samuel Wilberforce, Henry Alford, S. P. Tregelles, J. Henry Thayer, and Ezra Abbot. In all, one hundred and one scholars on both sides of the Atlantic worked upon this historic revision. The sources for this paragraph are from Revised New Testament and History of Revision, Authorized Version 1881. Hubbard Brothers, Publishers; and The Ancestry of our English Bible, by Ira Maurice Price, Harper and Brothers, Third Revised Edition, 1956. The first of these books asserts that Mr. Strong graduated from Wesleyan University in 1844, in its brief biography of him.

Amongst others, some of his lesser works are "A New Harmony and Exposition of the Gospels" (1852); "Scripture History delineated from the Biblical Records and all other Accessible Sources" (1878) and "The Tabernacle of Israel in the Desert" (1888).
