= Constantijn l'Empereur =

Dutch Hebraist, Orientalist and theologist

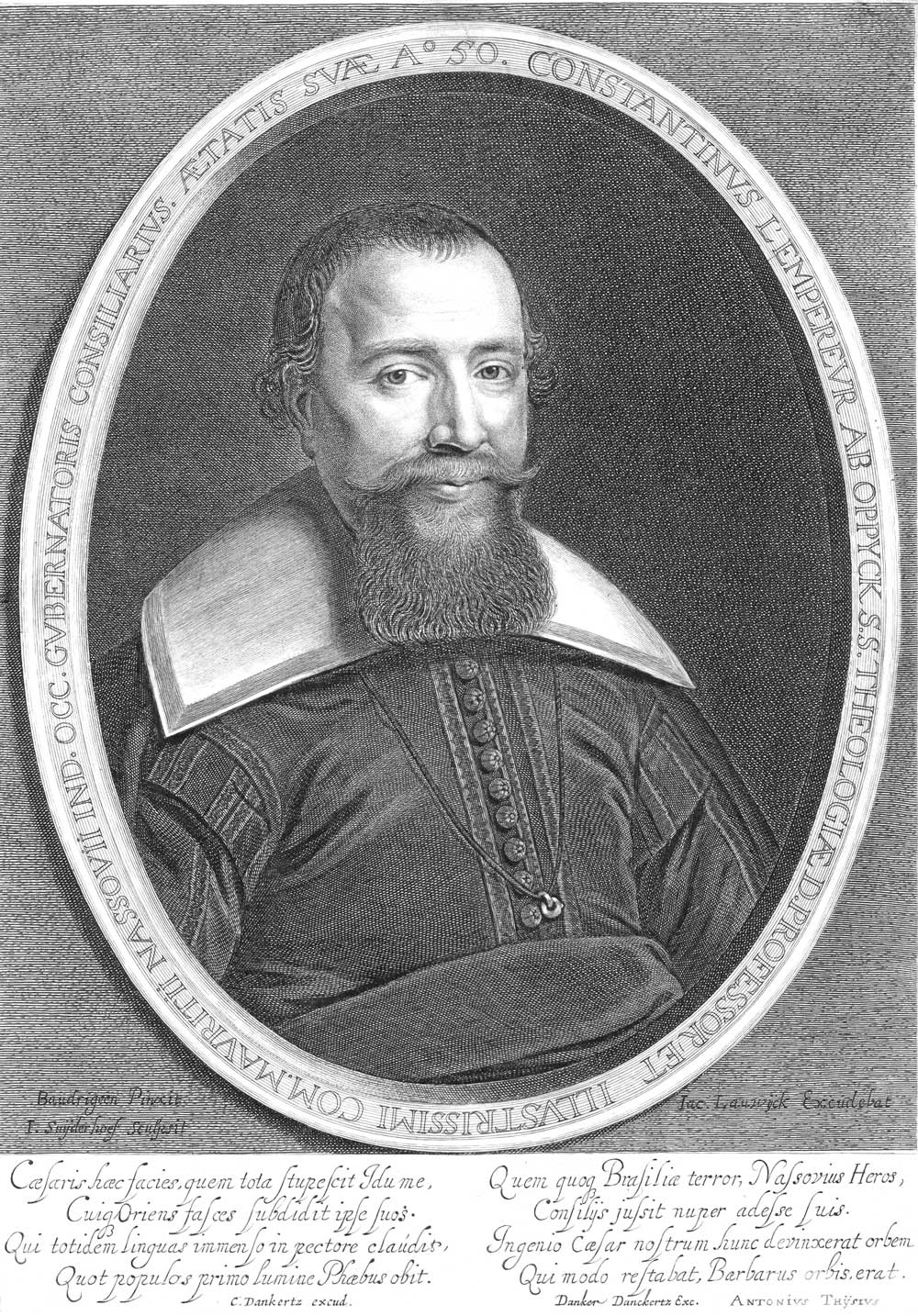
Constantijn l'Empereur

Constantijn l'Empereur (July 1591 – June 1648) was a prominent Dutch Hebraist, a distinguished Orientalist and doctor of theology.

== Biography ==
He was born in July 1591 in Bremen, Germany, to where his parents had fled from the Southern Netherlands, modern Belgium, after his grandfather was executed by the Council of Troubles. He acquired great reputation for his knowledge of the oriental languages. He was also an able lawyer and divine. He studied the oriental languages under Drusius and Erpenius at the University of Franeker and took his degree of doctor in the latter faculty in 1617. In 1619 he was made professor of theology and Hebrew at Harderwijk. After eight years, in 1627 he was made professor of Hebrew and Aramaic at the University of Leyden on which occasion he delivered an harangue on the dignity and utility of the Hebrew language and it was his constant endeavour to diffuse a knowledge of that language and of the Arabic and Syriac among his countrymen that they might be the better enabled to combat the objections of the Jews to the Christian religion. He translated and published several editions of the popular 'Travels of Rabbi Benjamin ben Jonah', one Latin-Hebrew Edition with and another one without notes, one Hebrew Edition at Bale, which his friends – the Buxtorfs – sent to Joseph Scaliger who mentioned it favourably in a letter, which was included in a version of Benjamins Travels, printed in 1666 in Amsterdam, collated with a Dutch translation of the Bara, together with a text from the celebrated rabbi Manassah ben Israel. l'Empereur's edition of Rabbi Benjamin of Tudela Itinerary was the basis for a popular German and French translation in the 17th and 18th Century.

In 1639 l'Empereur was appointed advisor to the very successful Johan Maurits van Nassau, who was governor of Dutch Brazil from 1637 to 1644. l'Empereur died in June 1648 very soon after he had begun a course of theology at Leyden. Amongst his closest friends were Daniel Heinsius, the Buxtorfs and Lewis de Dieu, minister of the Eglise Wallon. Daniel Heinsius and the Buxtorfs spoke very highly of him. He offered at one time to superintend the printing of a Talmudical dictionary in Holland and endeavoured to bring the younger Buxtorf to Leyden who had undertaken to defend the vowel points against Louis Cappel. He was also corresponding with the notable archbishop Usher.

== Works ==
l'Empereur's works are:

- Commentarius ad codicem Babylonicum, seu Tractatus Thalmudicus de mensuris Templi (Leyden, 1630),
- Versio et Notae ad Paraphrasin Josephi Jachiadae in Danielem (Amsterdam, 1633),
- Itinerarium D. Benjaminis in Hebrew and Latin (Leyden, 8 volumes),
- Moysis Kimchi Grammatica Chaldaica (Leyden, 8 volumes),
- Confutatio Abarbanelis et Alscheichi in caput liii Isaiae (Layden, 8 volumes, 1631, in French 1685),
- Commentarius in Tractatum Thalmudicum, qui dicitur Porta, de legibus Hebraeorum forensibus in Hebrew and Latin (Leyden, 1637) and
- Commentarius ad Betramum de Republica Hebraeorum (1641, 8 volumes).

== Sources ==
- Peter T. van Rooden, Theology, biblical scholarship, and rabbinical studies in the seventeenth century: Constantijn L'Empereur (1591–1648), professor of Hebrew and theology at Leiden (Vol. 6 of the Studies over de geschiedenis van de Leidse universiteit), ISBN 90-04-09035-5.
- Alexander Chalmers, The General Biographical Dictionary, "Empereur (Constantine)", Vol. 13, pp. 203, 204. Printed for J. Nichols, 1814.
