= Concordance (publishing) =

List of words or terms in a published book

A concordance is an alphabetical list of the principal words used in a book or body of work, listing every instance of each word with its immediate context. Historically, concordances have been compiled only for works of special importance, such as the Vedas, Bible, Qur'an or the works of Shakespeare, James Joyce or classical Latin and Greek authors, because of the time, difficulty, and expense involved in creating a concordance in the pre-computer era.

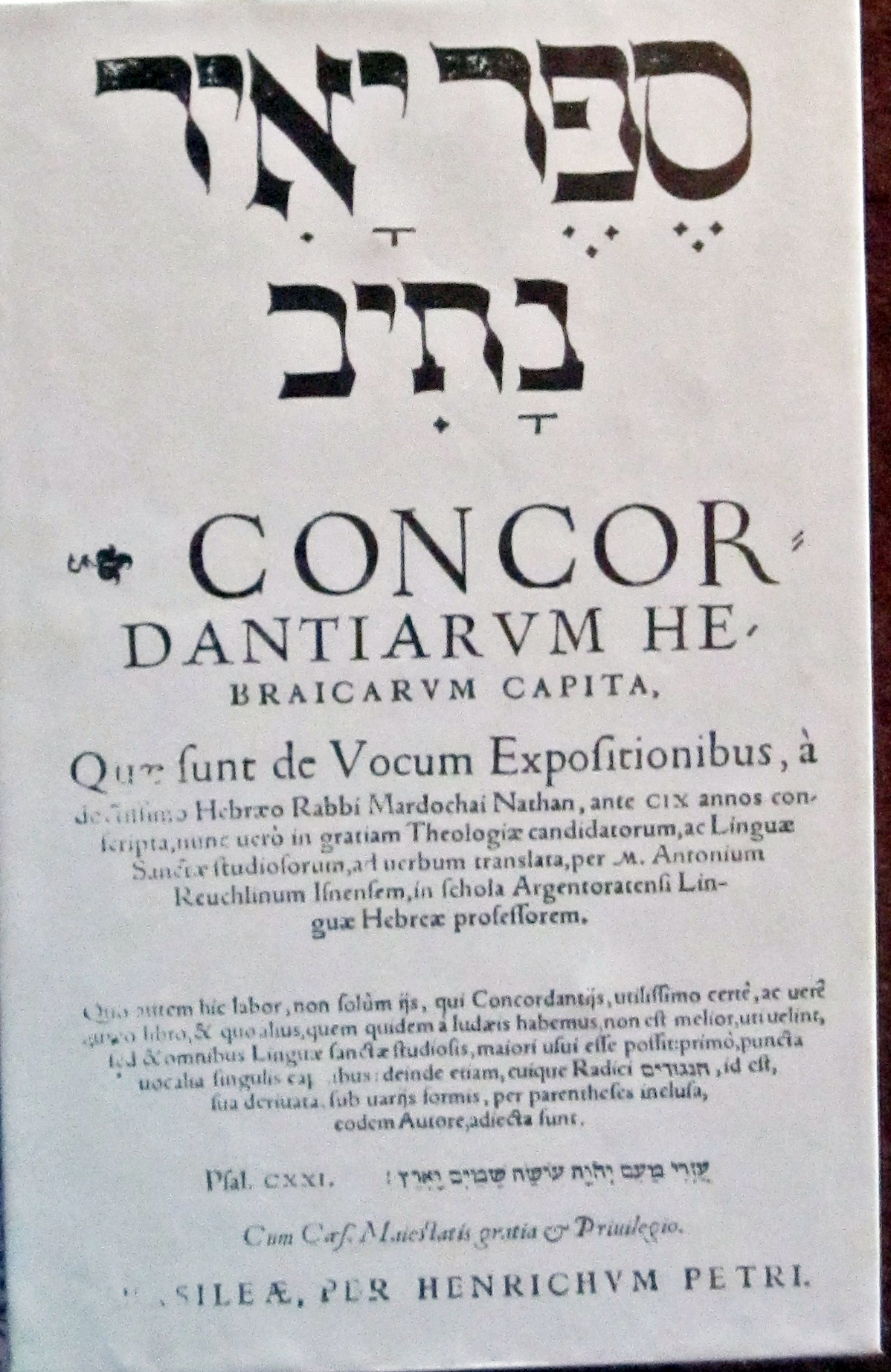
Mordecai Nathan's Hebrew-Latin Concordance of the Bible

A concordance is more than an index, with additional material such as commentary, definitions and topical cross-indexing which makes producing one a labor-intensive process even when assisted by computers.

In the precomputing era, search technology was unavailable, and a concordance offered readers of long works such as the Bible something comparable to search results for every word that they would have been likely to search for. Today, the ability to combine the result of queries concerning multiple terms (such as searching for words near other words) has reduced interest in concordance publishing. In addition, mathematical techniques such as latent semantic indexing have been proposed as a means of automatically identifying linguistic information based on word context.

A bilingual concordance is a concordance based on aligned parallel text.

A topical concordance is a list of subjects that a book covers (usually The Bible), with the immediate context of the coverage of those subjects. Unlike a traditional concordance, the indexed word does not have to appear in the verse. The best-known topical concordance is Nave's Topical Bible.

The first Bible concordance was compiled for the Vulgate Bible by Hugh of St Cher (d.1262), who employed 500 friars to assist him. In 1448, Rabbi Mordecai Nathan completed a concordance to the Hebrew Bible. It took him ten years. A concordance to the Greek New Testament was published in 1546 by Sixt Birck, and the Septuagint was done a by Conrad Kircher in 1602. The first concordance to the English Bible was published in 1550 by John Merbecke. According to Cruden, it did not employ the verse numbers devised by Robert Stephens in 1545, but "the pretty large concordance" of Mr Cotton did. Then followed Cruden's Concordance and Strong's Concordance.

== Use in linguistics ==
Concordances are frequently used in linguistics, when studying a text. For example:

- comparing different usages of the same word
- analysing keywords
- analysing word frequencies
- finding and analysing phrases and idioms
- finding translations of subsentential elements, e.g. terminology, in bitexts and translation memories
- creating indexes and word lists (also useful for publishing)

Concordancing techniques are widely used in national text corpora such as American National Corpus (ANC), British National Corpus (BNC), and Corpus of Contemporary American English (COCA) available on-line. Stand-alone applications that employ concordancing techniques are known as concordancers or more advanced corpus managers. Some of them have integrated part-of-speech taggers (POS taggers) and enable the user to create their own POS-annotated corpora to conduct various types of searches adopted in corpus linguistics.

== Inversion ==
The reconstruction of the text of some of the Dead Sea Scrolls involved a concordance.

Access to some of the scrolls was governed by a "secrecy rule" that allowed only the original International Team or their designates to view the original materials. After the death of Roland de Vaux in 1971, his successors repeatedly refused to even allow the publication of photographs to other scholars. This restriction was circumvented by Martin Abegg in 1991, who used a computer to "invert" a concordance of the missing documents made in the 1950s which had come into the hands of scholars outside of the International Team, to obtain an approximate reconstruction of the original text of 17 of the documents. This was soon followed by the release of the original text of the scrolls.

== See also ==
- A Vedic Word Concordance
- Bible concordance
- Cross-reference
- Key Word in Context
- Index
- Text mining
- Termbase
