= Alexander Cruden =

Scottish author of an early Bible concordance, proofreader and publisher

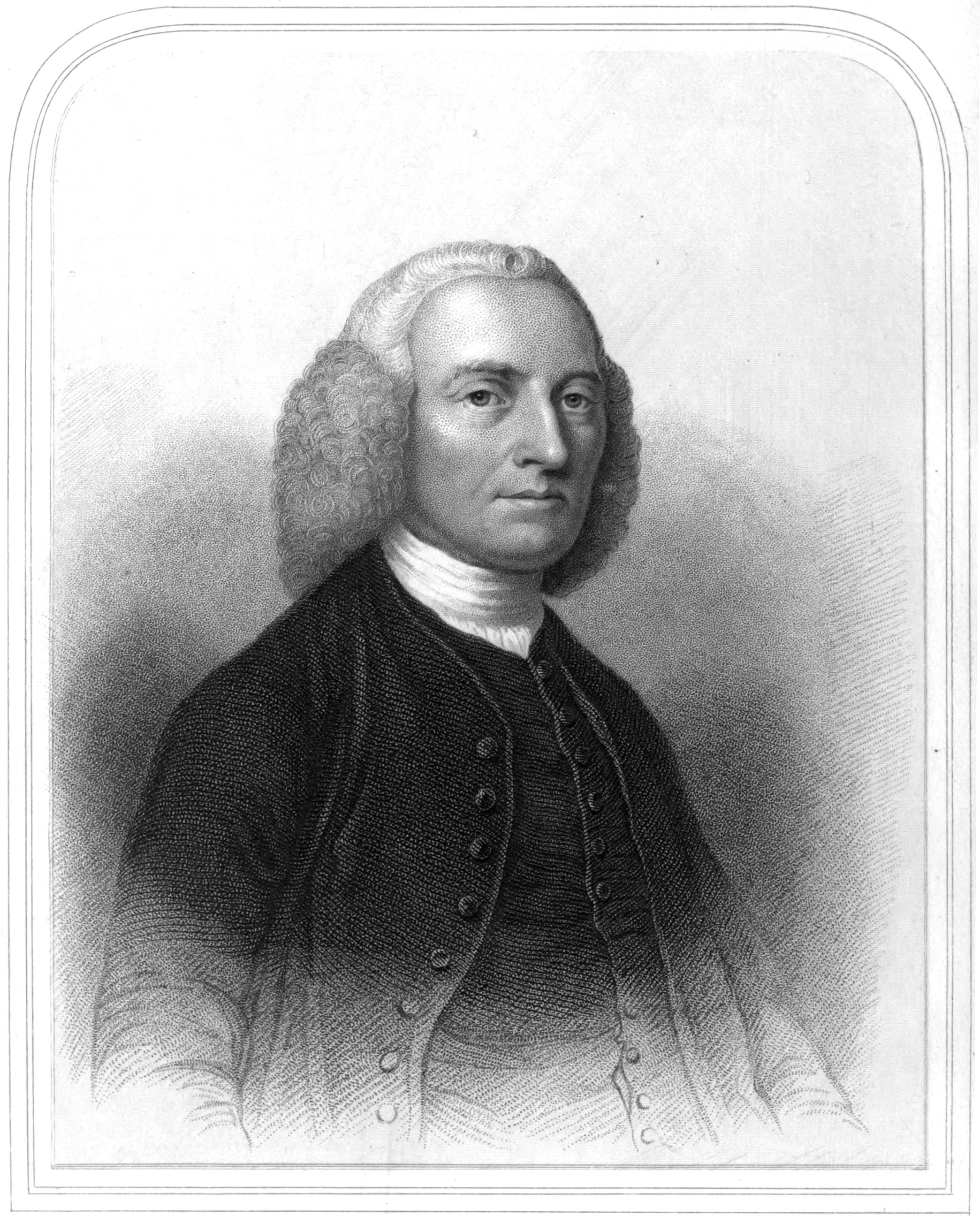
Alexander Cruden drawn by T. Fry.

Alexander Cruden (31 May 1699 – 1 November 1770) was the Scottish author of an early Bible concordance, a proofreader and publisher, and self-styled Corrector of the nation's morals.

== Early life and career ==
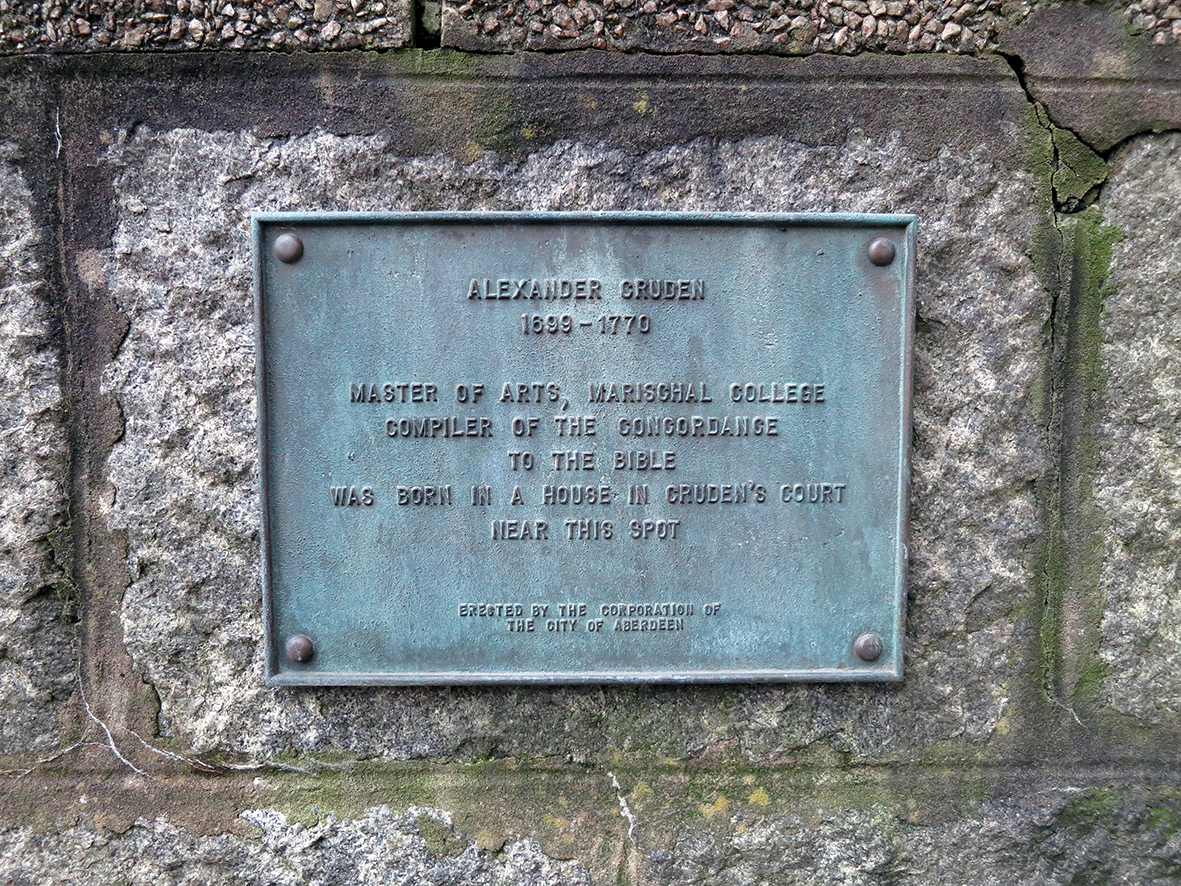
Alexander Cruden plaque in Aberdeen

Alexander Cruden was born in Aberdeen in Scotland (baptised on 8 June 1699, St. Nicholas Kirk, Aberdeen, according to recent research) and was educated at Aberdeen Grammar School and Marischal College, University of Aberdeen, and became an excellent Latin, Greek and Biblical scholar.

He took the degree of Master of Arts, but soon after began to show signs of insanity, owing to a disappointment in love. After a term of confinement he recovered and removed to London. In 1722 he had an engagement as private tutor to the son of a country squire living at Eton Hall, Southgate, and also held a similar post at Ware.

In 1729 he was employed by the 10th Earl of Derby as a reader and secretary, but was discharged on the 7th of July for his ignorance of French pronunciation. He then lodged in a house in Soho frequented exclusively by Frenchmen, and took lessons in the language in the hope of getting back his post with the earl, but when he went to Knowsley Hall in Lancashire, the earl would not see him.

== Concordance ==
Cruden's Bible Concordance became well-known, and further editions were published after his death. It has not been out of print since 1737 and is still encountered today on the shelves of priests and biblical scholars.

There were some primitive concordances before Cruden; however, they were unsystematic, popular aids rather than scholarly tools. Cruden worked alone and produced the most consistent and complete concordance until the introduction of computerised indexing. As well as compiling occurrences, he also invented a new method of presentation, which showed the surrounding sentence rather than just the verse reference. It provided the literary context and so made the concordance significantly easier to handle for false positives.

Cruden presented the first edition of his work on 3 November 1737 to Queen Caroline (wife of George II); but she died some days later without rewarding Cruden, who had to go into debt to finance the printing. The second edition of the Concordance was dedicated to King George III and presented to him in person on 21 December 1761; the King awarded Cruden £100 for his efforts. The third edition was published in 1769. After the slow success of the first edition, the second and third made Cruden considerable profit.

== Corrector ==
As well as producing the concordance, Cruden worked as a proofreader and bookseller. Several editions of Greek and Latin classics are said to have owed their accuracy to his care. He opened a booksellers shop in the Royal Exchange. In April 1735 he obtained the title of bookseller to the Queen by recommendation of the Lord Mayor and most of the Whig aldermen. The post was an unremunerative sinecure. After failing to obtain the honour of knighthood, he was nominated as Parliamentary candidate for the City of London in 1754, but he decided to withdraw. At some point after this, Cruden adopted the title of Corrector. Cruden saw it as his personal mission to safeguard the nation's spelling and grammar, and through that, the nation's moral health. He was particularly concerned with misspelt signs, graffiti, swearing and the keeping of the Sabbath, and was in the habit of carrying a sponge, with which he effaced all inscriptions and signs which he thought incorrect or contrary to good morals.

He was treated with the respect due to his learning by officials and residents in both (Oxford and Cambridge) universities, but experienced some boisterous fooling at the hands of the undergraduates. At Cambridge he was knighted with mock ceremonies. There he appointed deputy correctors to represent him in the university. He also visited Eton, Windsor, Tonbridge, and Westminster schools, where he appointed four boys to be his deputies. An Admonition to Cambridge is preserved among letters from J. Neville of Emmanuel to Dr. Cos Macro, in the British Museum.

Against the radical John Wilkes, whom he hated, he wrote a small pamphlet, and used to delete with his sponge the number 45 wherever he found it, this being the offensive symbol of Wilkes.

The Correctors Earnest Address to the Inhabitants of Great Britain, published in 1756, was occasioned by the earthquake at Lisbon. In 1762 he saved an ignorant seaman, Richard Potter, from the gallows, and in 1763 published a pamphlet recording the history of the case. In 1769 he lectured in Aberdeen as Corrector, and distributed copies of the fourth commandment and various religious tracts. The wit that made his eccentricities palatable is illustrated by the story of how he gave to a conceited young minister whose appearance displeased him A Mother's Catechism dedicated to the young and ignorant.

== Other works ==
Cruden published a pamphlet dedicated to Lord H. (probably Harrington, a Secretary of State) entitled The London Citizen exceedingly injured, or a British Inquisition Displayed. He also published an account of his legal problems, dedicated to the King.

He superintended the printing of one of Matthew Henry's Commentaries, and in 1750 printed a small Compendium of the Holy Bible (an abstract of the contents of each chapter). In 1761 Cruden compiled "A Complete Concordance to the Apocrypha", generally known as Cruden's Concordance. The Scripture Dictionary, compiled during Cruden's later years, was printed in Aberdeen in two volumes shortly after his death in 1770.

== Mental health ==
After his University education, Cruden was set to enter the church until his mental health was called into question and he was institutionalised. This was the first of several stays in mental hospitals throughout his life.

Cruden's frequent institutionalisation is a matter of academic debate. Traditionally, Cruden's apparent madness has been interpreted as the other side of his focused brilliance. However Julia Keay argued that he was not mad, but he was initially put away to silence his criticisms of incestuous marriages among the nobility, and later by women who rejected his unwanted affections; he paid unwelcome addresses to a widow which resulted in an enforced stay in Matthew Wright's Private Madhouse in Bethnal Green, London.

In September 1753, through being involved in a street brawl, he was confined in an asylum in Chelsea for seventeen days at the insistence of his sister (Mrs. Isobella Wild of Middle Green Langley). He brought an unsuccessful action against his friends, and seriously proposed that they should go into confinement as an atonement.

In April 1755 he printed a letter to The Speaker and other Members of the House of Commons, and about the same time an Address to the King and Parliament. Also in 1755 he paid unwelcome addresses to the daughter of Sir Thomas Abney, of Newington (1640–1722).

Cruden was never married.

== Death ==
Cruden died suddenly while praying in his lodgings in Camden Passage, Islington, on 1 November 1770. He was buried in the ground of a Protestant dissenting congregation in Dead Man's Place, Southwark. He bequeathed a portion of his savings for a bursary at Aberdeen, which preserves his name on the list of benefactors of the university.

== Sources ==
- Andrews, Jonathan. and Scull, Andrew, Undertaker of the mind: John Monro and mad-doctoring in eighteenth century England. University of California Press, 2001.
- Farrow, John F. "Alexander Cruden and his concordance". Indexer. 20, Apr. 1996, p. 55-6.
- Ingram, Allan. Voices of madness: four pamphlets 1683–1796. Sutton, 1997.
- Keay, Julia. Alexander the Corrector: the tormented genius who unwrote the bible. Overlook Press, 2005. ISBN 0-00-713195-X
- Olivier, Edith. Alexander the Corrector: the eccentric life of Alexander Cruden. Viking Press, 1934.
- Pearsall, Ronald. Cruden of the concordance. New Blackfriars, 53, Feb. 1971, p. 88–90.
- Unattributed. 'The Life and Character of Alexander Cruden' in Cruden's Unabridged Concordance. Baker Books, Grand Rapids, Michigan, May 1953.
