= Strong's Concordance =

Bible concordance, constructed under the direction of James Strong

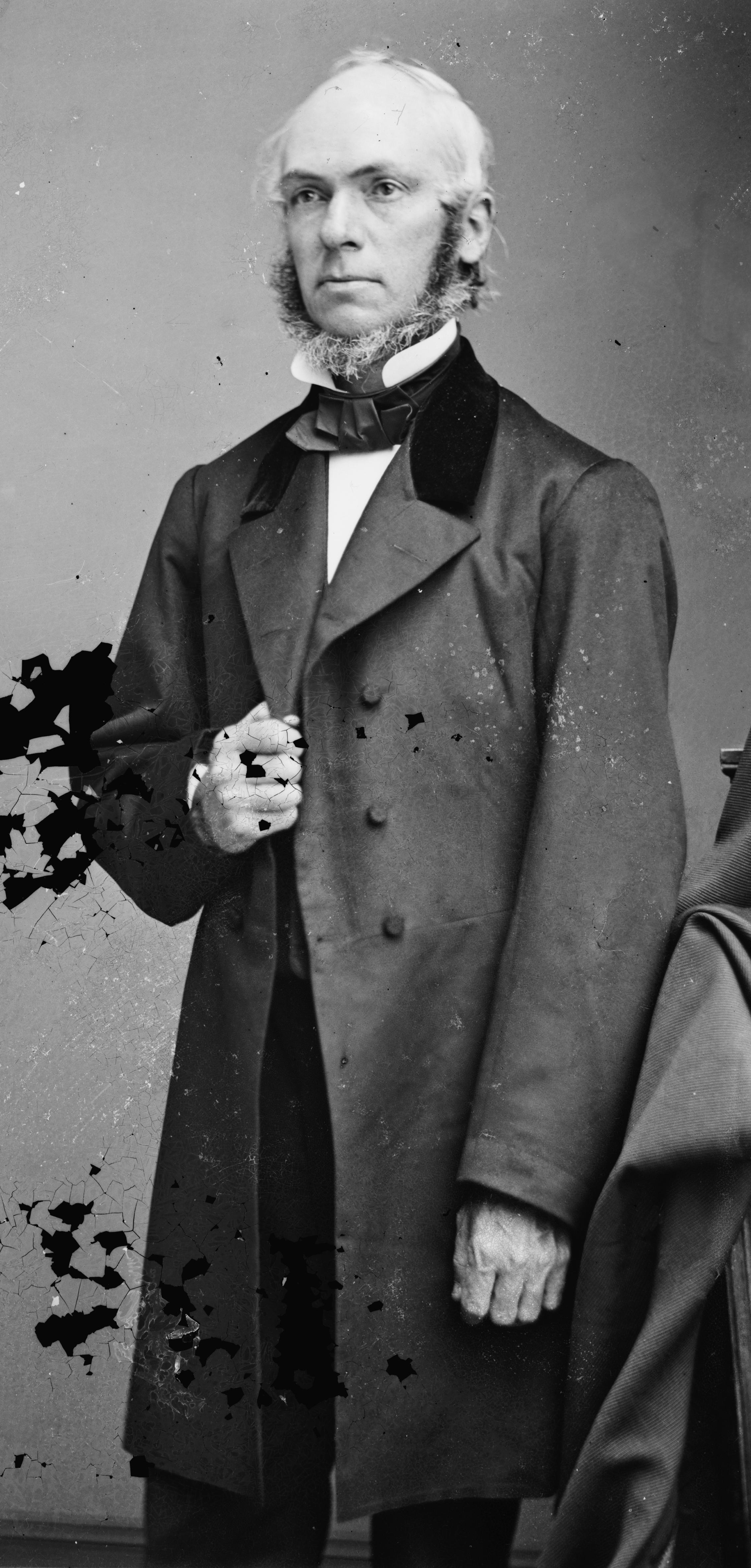
James Strong (1822–1894)

The Exhaustive Concordance of the Bible, (Note: The complete title of the original work was The Exhaustive Concordance of the Bible: Showing Every Word of the Text of the Common English Version of the Canonical Books, and Every Occurrence of Each Word in Regular Order: Together with A Comparative Concordance of the Authorized and Revised Versions, Including the American Variations; Also Brief Dictionaries of the Hebrew and Greek Words of the Original, with References to the English Words.) generally known as Strong's Concordance, is a Bible concordance, an index of every word in the King James Version (KJV), constructed under the direction of American theologian James Strong. Strong first published his Concordance in 1890, while professor of exegetical theology at Drew Theological Seminary.

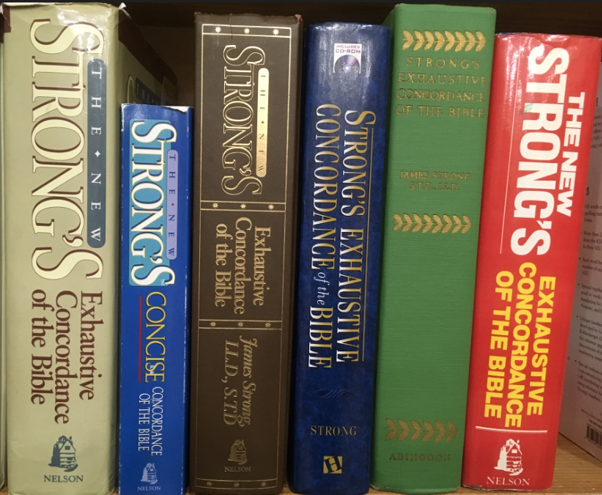
Editions and reprints of Strong's Concordance, now in the public domain

== Use ==
Strong's Concordance provides an index to the Bible. This allows the reader to find words where they appear in the Bible. It also lets the reader directly compare how the same word may be used elsewhere in the Bible.

== Strong's numbers ==
Each original-language word (Hebrew or Greek) is given an entry number in the dictionary of those original language words listed in the back of the concordance. These have become known as the "Strong's numbers". The main concordance lists each word that appears in the KJV Bible in alphabetical order with each verse in which it appears listed in order of its appearance in the Bible, with a snippet of the surrounding text (including the word in italics). Appearing to the right of the scripture reference is the Strong's number. This allows the user of the concordance to look up the meaning of the original language word in the associated dictionary in the back, thereby showing how the original language word was translated into the English word in the KJV Bible.

Strong's Concordance includes:

- The 8,674 Hebrew root words used in the Old Testament. (Example: אֱנוֹשׁ (H582))
- The 5,624 Greek root words used in the New Testament. (Example: λόγος (G3056))

Although the Greek words in Strong's Concordance are numbered 1–5624, the numbers 2717 and 3203–3302 are unassigned due to "changes in the enumeration while in progress". Not every distinct word is assigned a number, but rather only the root words. For example, αγαπησεις is assigned the same number as αγαπατε – both are listed as Greek word #25 in Strong's Concordance (αγαπαω).

Due to Strong's numbers it became possible to translate concordances from one language into another. Thus, the Russian concordance of 30,000 words from the Russian Thompson Study Bible is a translation of the English concordance from Thompson Chain-Reference Bible. In the process of compiling the Russian concordance, the Hebrew/Greek word corresponding to the English concordance word was found, and then its Russian equivalent in the Russian Synodal translation of the Bible was added to the resulting Russian concordance text.

== Strong's dictionaries ==
In the 1890 version, Strong added a "Hebrew and Chaldee Dictionary" and a "Greek Dictionary of the New Testament" to his concordance. In the preface to both dictionaries, Strong explains that these are "brief and simple" dictionaries, not meant to replace reference to "a more copious and elaborate Lexicon". He mentions Gesenius and Fürst as examples of the lexicons that Strong's is drawn from. His dictionaries were meant to give students a quick and simple way to look up words and have a general idea of their meaning.

== See also ==
- Cruden's Concordance
- Gesenius' Lexicon
- Hermeneutics
- Stephanus pagination
- Young's Analytical Concordance to the Bible
- Brown–Driver–Briggs
