= Thompson Chain-Reference Bible =

Christian study Bible

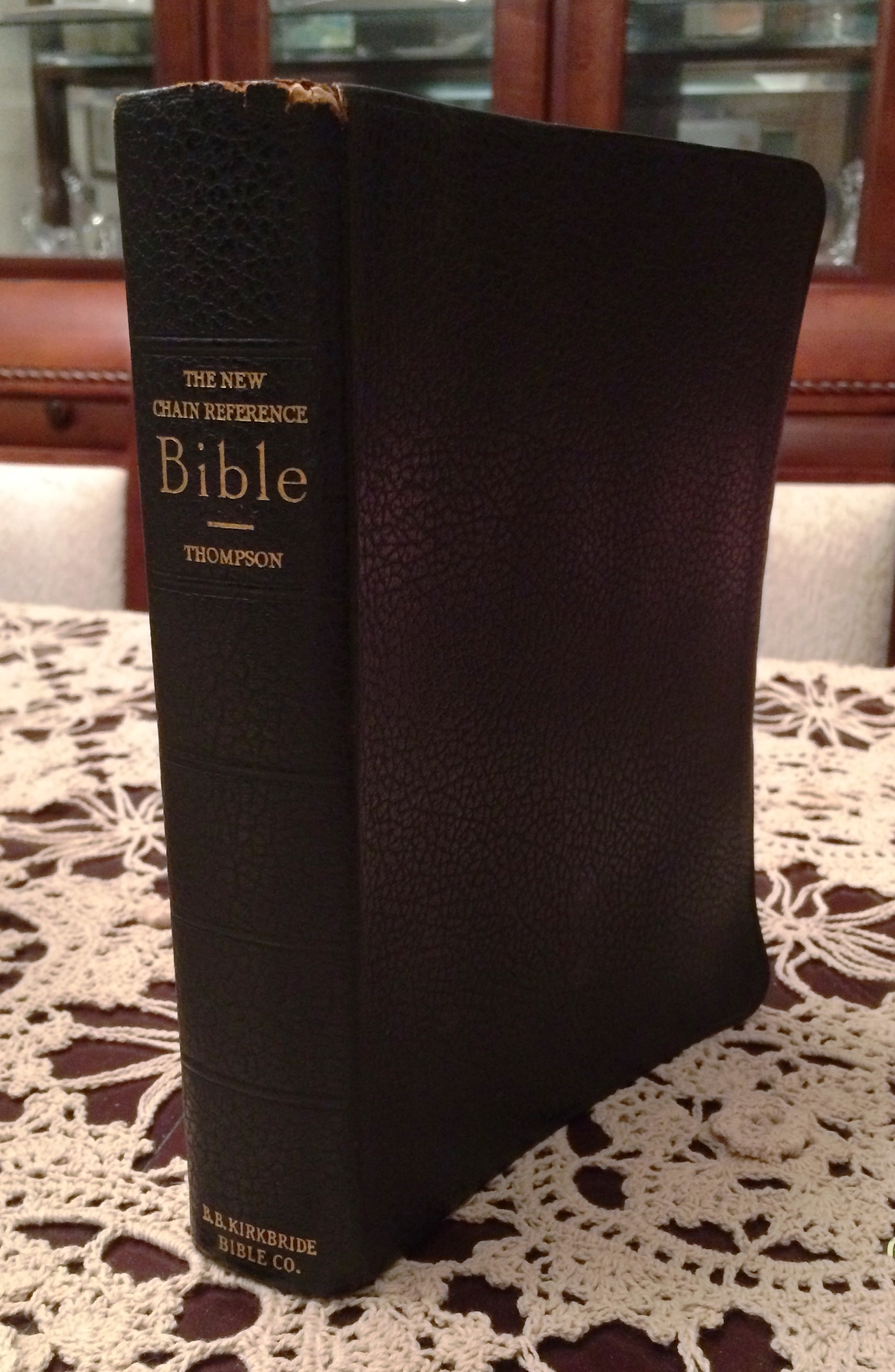
King James edition of the Thompson Chain-Reference Bible.

The Thompson Chain-Reference Bible is a Christian study Bible originally published by the Kirkbride Bible Company and now published by Zondervan.

== History ==
The Thompson Chain-Reference system was devised by its namesake, Frank Charles Thompson, in the early 1900s, but the original work was started in 1890. Thompson was born in 1858, in Elmira, New York, and was ordained in 1879. His wife was Laura Boughton Thompson. He began work on the system because of his dissatisfaction with the reference Bibles that were then available to preachers:

Dr. Thompson believed the Bible should be presented in a simple, but scholarly way. He saw the need for a well-organized reference Bible that would be of practical use to the layman as well as a minister. In 1890, Dr. Thompson began the work he would continue for the rest of his life. He completed the "thought suggestions" opposite the verses throughout the Bible. These are what became the "chain-links" that are the heart of the Thompson system. Some of the men in Dr. Thompson's church saw his Bible and told him this would be a great help to them in their Bible study too. They encouraged Dr. Thompson to have his Bible, with marginal references, published so that everyone could enjoy the blessing of this helpful study tool.

The first version of Thompson's study Bible was published in 1908 by the Methodists Book Concern of Dobbs Ferry, New York. Five years later, in 1913, Thompson was joined by B. B. Kirkbride, of Indianapolis, Indiana. The two men formed the Kirkbride Bible Company in order to further improve and distribute Thompson's work.

The original Thompson Chain-Reference Bible, as well as several subsequent versions, were based on the King James Bible. Currently, editions based on the King James Version, New King James Version, New International Version (1978 version; now out of print), New American Standard Bible (1977 version), and English Standard Version are available, as well as electronic versions that incorporate other features.

As of 2006, more than four million Thompson Chain-Reference Bibles have been sold.

On December 3, 2020, HarperCollins Christian Publishing announced its acquisition of the Thompson Chain-Reference Bible product assets from Kirkbride Bible Company. The Bible brand will be stewarded by the Zondervan publishing group.

=== Editions ===
The following table outlines the publication history of the King James version of the Thompson Chain-Reference Bible. The changes from one edition to another are generally seen in the margins of the Bible and in the study materials in the back of the Bible, rather than the Biblical text itself. (A “Revised Edition” listed in the table does not refer to a “Revised Version” of the Bible.)

Actual edition number*	Declared edition**	Year of copyright	Notes
1		1908	
2	Revised Edition	1917	
3	Second Revised Edition	1929	
4	Third Improved Edition	1934	
5	Third Improved Edition	1957	Title page makes no distinction between this edition and the “Third Improved Edition” of 1934. It has a separate year of copyright and likely contains minor changes/additions to the reference material.
6	Fourth Improved Edition	1964	This was the first K.J.V. edition made available in a red-letter edition.
7	Fourth Improved Edition, Updated	1982	Some copies of this edition have a copyright year of 1983 instead of 1982.
8	Fifth Improved Edition	1988	Following the acquisition of Kirkbride, Zondervan republished this edition in 2021. The contents of the republished version are identical to the contents of Kirkbride's fifth improved edition, but the title page does not declare it to be the fifth improved edition (or any other edition for that matter).
9		2022	While the title page could have called this the “Sixth Improved Edition” to maintain the numbering of editions that Kirkbride started, Zondervan does not declare any edition number. However, this edition is marketed as the “Comfort Print” edition, as the typesetting and illustrations have all been completely redone in a different style.

*An unofficial edition number, determined by merely counting each unique and substantial edition published.
**As shown on the title page (if any edition is declared).

== Chains ==
The heart of the Thompson Chain-Reference system is Thompson's "chain topics". The system incorporates over 4,000 such chains. As an example, the entry for Amalek says:

124—AMALEK, a descendant of Esau, Ge 36:12, Ex 17:8, Dt 25:17, 1Sa 15:3, 28:18, 2Sa 1:1, 1Ch 4:43.

Genesis 36:12 has the following margin note:

124 Amalek, Ex 17:8

The "chain" continues in Exodus 17:8 which has this margin note:

124 Amalek, Dt 25:17

and so on, until 1 Chronicles 4:43 which has the margin note:

124 Amalek ‡

indicating the end of the chain. Other chains are more complex. Chain topic 3724, for example, concerns the general topic of unity:

UNITY—STRIFE
(A) UNITY of Believers.
3724—(1) In Christ.
Ro 12:5 so in Christ we who are many form one body, and each member belongs to all the others.
1Co 10:17 Because there is one loaf, we, who are many, are one body, for we all partake of the one loaf. (1Co 12:12)
...
See Saints' Fellowship. 1325

This topic is divided into the major subtopics of "UNITY of Believers", "COOPERATION", and "STRIFE", each of which is divided into further topics. The general section contains 12 individual chains, some of considerable size. Many also incorporate references to chains treated elsewhere, such as the reference to Saints' Fellowship (chain 1325). The chain numbers feature prominently in the Thompson system, and the chain topics are listed in numerical order.

== Comprehensive Bible assistance ==
In addition to the chain topics, the Thompson Chain-Reference Bible includes a number of other aids to Bible study:

- Bible readings "including a wide range of subjects for use in private devotions and public services". These consist of individual Bible verses on a large number of specific topics, classified under more general topics.
- Outline studies of the Bible "including a study of the Bible as a whole by periods and by books"
- Analyses of the books of the Bible giving the origin of the name of the book, the author or authors, key words, a synopsis or analysis, and so on
- Character studies including
  - in-depth studies of Noah, Abraham, Jacob, Joseph, Joshua, Gideon, Samuel, David, Solomon, Elijah, Elisha and Daniel
  - a list of prominent Bible characters
  - an outline history of the Apostles
  - portraits of Christ
  - chronology of Biblical prophecies
- Bible harmonies and illustrated studies "including life trees, pictorial maps, charts, outlines"
- Archaeological supplement, with a general introduction to Biblical archeology and an archaeological treatment of many of the places mentioned in the Bible.
- Concordance
- Bible maps
