= Avraham Even-Shoshan =

Belarusian-born Israeli linguist

- אברהם אבן־שוֹשן
- Born: Avraham Rosenstein; 25 December 1906; Minsk, Russian Empire (now Belarus)
- Died: 8 August 1984 (aged 77); Tel Aviv, Israel
- Resting place: Har HaMenuchot, Jerusalem
- Education: College for Hebrew Teachers; Hebrew University of Jerusalem
- Occupations: Linguist; lexicographer
- Notable work: Even-Shoshan Dictionary
- Awards: Israel Prize (1978); Bialik Prize (1981)

Avraham Even-Shoshan (Note: Russian: Авраа́м Э́вен-Шоша́н, romanized: Avraam Even-Shoshan; Hebrew: אַבְרָהָם אֶבֶן שׁוֹשָׁן) (né Rozenshteyn; (Note: Russian: Розенштейн; Hebrew: רוזנשטיין.) 25 December 1906 – 8 August 1984) was a Belarusian-born Israeli linguist and lexicographer of the Hebrew language. His most notable work is compiling the Even-Shoshan dictionary, one of the foremost Hebrew dictionaries.

== Biography ==
Avraham Rozenshteyn was born in Minsk, in the Russian Empire, on 25 December 1906. He attended the cheder run by his father, who later sent him to public school and yeshiva.

Rosenstein managed to avoid the British restrictions on Jewish immigration to Mandatory Palestine and settled there in 1925, where he changed his name to Even-Shoshan, a translation of Rosenstein, and initially worked as a laborer. He studied at the College for Hebrew Teachers (now the David Yellin College of Education) in Jerusalem and the Hebrew University of Jerusalem. He worked as a teacher in Jerusalem until 1967.

In 1946–58, Even-Shoshan compiled HaMilon HeHadash (The New Dictionary of the Hebrew Language), which since 2003 has become known as the Even-Shoshan Dictionary. The completed dictionary consisted of 24,698 main entries and about 70,000 words, and is still in print. It includes synonyms in Arabic, Aramaic, Akkadian, and Ugaritic. He was also the author of the Even-Shoshan concordance and co-author of the Bialik concordance.

Even-Shoshan died in the Hadassah Medical Center in Jerusalem in 1984. He was buried in the Har HaMenuchot.

== Awards ==
- In 1978, Even-Shoshan was awarded the Israel Prize, for language.
- In 1981, he was the co-recipient (jointly with Zev Vilnay) of the Bialik Prize for Jewish thought.

== Published works ==
- A New Concordance of the Bible: Thesaurus of the Language of the Bible, Hebrew and Aramaic, Roots, Words, Proper Names Phrases and Synonyms (1984)

== See also ==
- List of Bialik Prize recipients
- List of Israel Prize recipients
