= Cruden's Concordance =

Verbal index to the King James Bible created by Alexander Cruden

Alexander Cruden's Complete Concordance to the Holy Scriptures. First published 1737. The first entry, for example, 'abase' appears in the King James Version of the Bible (KJV) four times; in the books of Job, Isaiah, Ezekiel, and Daniel. The header of the column of the first entry, 'abi', is the first three letters of the last entry on that page.

A Complete Concordance to the Holy Scriptures, generally known as Cruden's Concordance, is a concordance of the King James Bible (KJV) that was singlehandedly created by Alexander Cruden (1699–1770). The Concordance was first published in 1737 and has not been out of print since then. Two editions of the Concordance appeared during his lifetime, 1761 and 1769. (Reference 1955 edition)

== Publication and composition ==
Cruden's concordance was first published in 1737, one of the first copies being personally presented to Queen Caroline on November 3, 1737. Cruden began work on his concordance in 1735, whilst working as a bookseller in London. Cruden worked alone from 7:00 a.m. to 1:00 p.m. every day and completed the bulk of the work in less than a year. The proofreading and layout took a little longer.

His brain was occupied with nothing else, so much so that he failed to notice the diminishing stock in his bookshop and the consequent lack of custom. "Was there ever, before or since the year 1737", writes his biographer Edith Olivier, "another enthusiast for whom it was no drudgery, but a sustained passion of delight, to creep conscientiously word by word through every chapter of the Bible, and that not once only, but again and again?".

== Errors ==
Although a remarkable feat, the concordance was not entirely without error. The Times recorded that Cruden left out Buz (brother of Huz) and Sneeze (put under Neeze). In fact, the name "Chloe" (appearing in 1 Corinthians 1:11) was missing until a revised edition was published in 1930.

== See also ==
- Strong's Concordance
- Young's Analytical Concordance to the Bible
