= Buxtorf =

Buxtorf is a surname. Notable people with the surname include:

- August Buxtorf (1877–1969), Swiss geologist
- Johannes Buxtorf (1564–1629), German theologian
- Johannes Buxtorf II (1599–1664), Swiss theologian, son of Johannes
- Johannes Jakob Buxtorf (1645–1705), Swiss Hebraist, son of Johannes II
