= Robert Young (biblical scholar) =

Scottish biblical scholar and book publisher

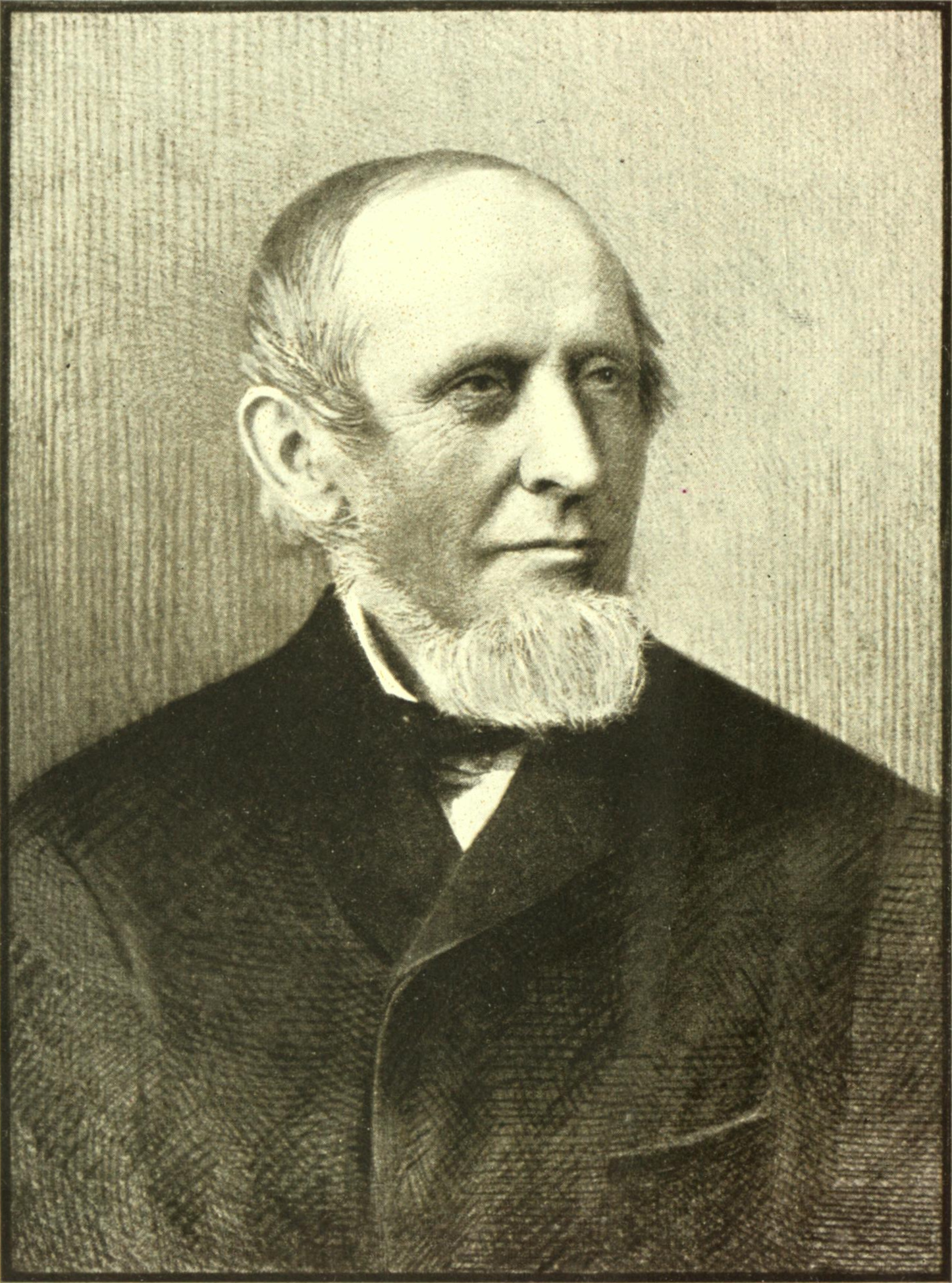
- Portrait of Young Featured in 7th Edition of Young's Analytical Concordance to the Bible published by the Religious Tract Society
- Born: 10 September 1822; Edinburgh, Scotland
- Died: 14 October 1888 (aged 66); Edinburgh, Scotland
- Occupation: Biblical Scholar
- Spouse: Margaret Turnbull (1823-1887)
- Children: Robert, Jane Eliza, Margaret, George Adam, Katherine Agnes, Annie, John Henry
- Parent: John Young

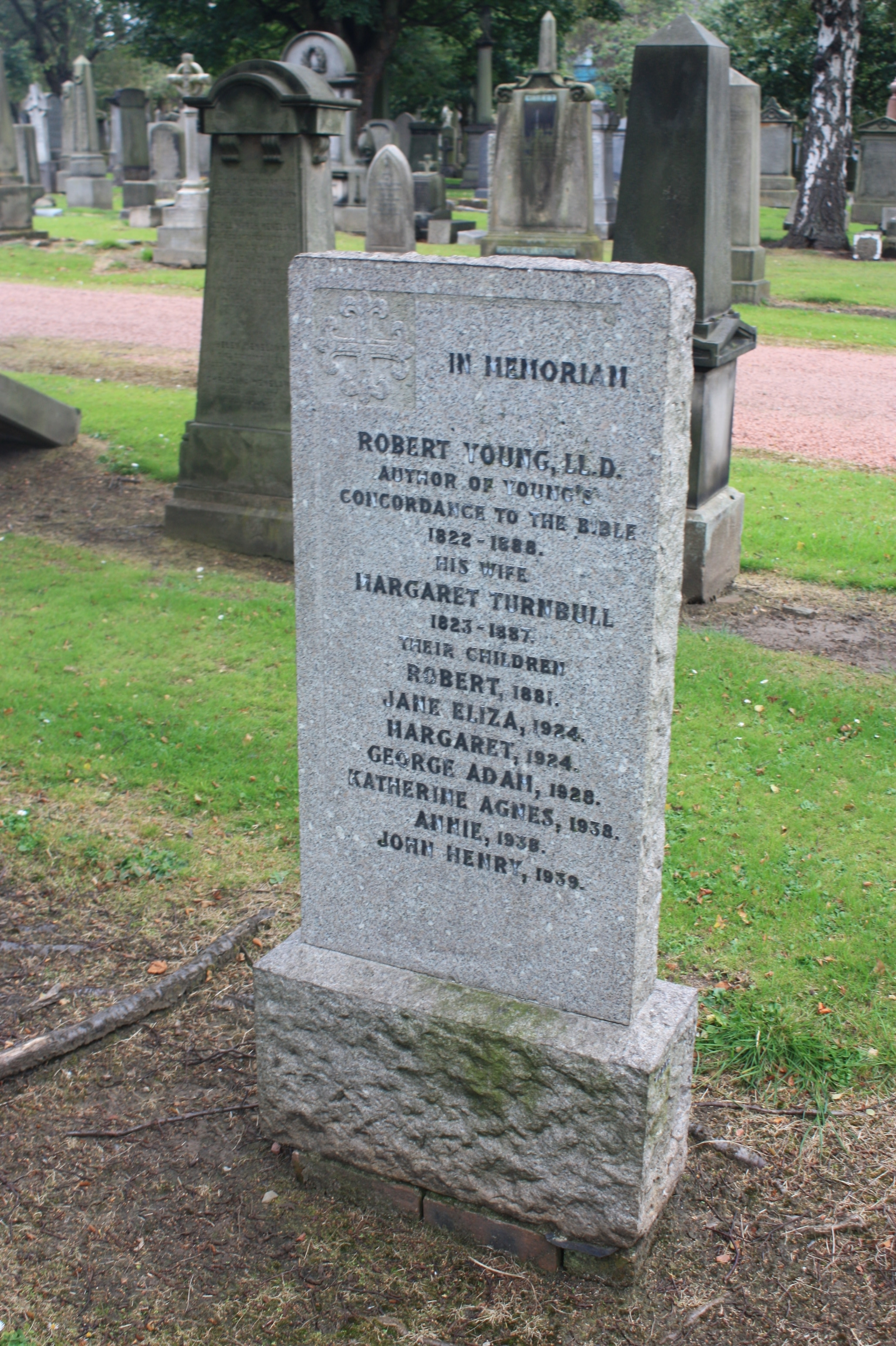
Robert Young's grave, Grange Cemetery, Edinburgh

Robert Young (10 September 1822 – 14 October 1888) was a Scottish publisher who was self-taught and proficient in various Semitic languages. He published several works, the best known being a Bible translation, commonly referred to as Young's Literal Translation, and his Bible concordance, The Analytical Concordance to the Bible.

== Life ==
Robert Young was born in Edinburgh, Scotland, the son of John Young, a book-binder on Parliament Square, on the Royal Mile. He served an apprenticeship in printing and simultaneously taught himself various oriental languages. He eventually joined the Free Church, and in 1847 he started his own business of printing and selling books, particularly of works related to Old Testament studies, with a shop at 5 North Bank Street off the Royal Mile.

For three years he was connected with Thomas Chalmers's Territorial church sabbath school in the West Port, Edinburgh. From 1856 to 1861, he was a literary missionary and superintendent of the mission press at Surat; and during this time he added Gujarati to his acquirements. From 1864 to 1874 he conducted the ‘Missionary Institute;’ in 1867, he visited cities in the United States. In 1871 he was an unsuccessful candidate for the Hebrew chair at the University of St Andrews. Most of his life was passed in Edinburgh, where he died at home, 14 Grange Terrace, on 14 October 1888.

He is buried in the north-east section of the Grange Cemetery.

== Family ==
He was married to Margaret Turnbull (1823-1887). They had three sons and four daughters.

== Works ==
On starting business as a printer, he published works intended to facilitate the study of the Old Testament and its versions, of which the first was an edition with translation of Maimonides's 613 precepts.

His major works include:

- The Analytical Concordance to the Bible for the King James Version
- A Literal Translation of the Bible, 1862, with a revision in 1887, and a posthumous revision in 1898
- Concise Critical Comments on the Holy Bible, a companion to A Literal Translation of the Bible
- Dictionary of Bible Words & Synonyms, or a Key to the Hidden Meanings of the Sacred Scripture
- Grammatical analysis of the Hebrew, Chaldee, and Greek Scriptures. The Book of Psalms in Hebrew

== Notes ==
Attribution

- This article incorporates text from a publication now in the public domain: "Young, Robert (1822-1888)". Dictionary of National Biography. London: Smith, Elder & Co. 1885–1900.
