= Johannes Jakob Buxtorf =

Swiss Hebrew professor

Johannes Jakob Buxtorf (September 4, 1645 – April 4, 1705) was Professor of Hebrew at Basel. He was a son of Johannes Buxtorf II, by his fourth wife.

== Life ==
He was born in Basel and educated at the university there. According to a letter written by his father to Coccejus in 1663, he was able at eighteen to read the Hebrew text of the Bible and of the Targums; and he is said also to have had some acquaintance with the Rabbinic and the Syriac.

He succeeded his father as professor of Hebrew in November, 1664. In the following year he received leave of absence and visited Geneva, France, Holland (wintering at Leyden), and London. The general suspicion of foreigners in London just after the great fire of 1666, however, caused Buxtorf to take refuge in a neighboring village, whence he later went to Oxford and Cambridge.

In 1669 he returned to Basel and resumed his duties at the university, in addition to acting as librarian. After his death the library collected by the three Buxtorfs (I., II., and III.), and valued at 300 louis d'or, was secured for 1,000 thalers by the public library at Basel.

== Works ==
He wrote little with the exception of a preface to his edition of his grandfather's Tiberias (Basel, 1665), and his emendations to the Synagoga Judaica (1680).
