= Martin Abegg =

American scholar

Martin Gerald Abegg Jr. (born March 6, 1950) is a Dead Sea Scrolls scholar, researcher, and professor. Abegg is responsible for reconstructing the full text of the Dead Sea Scrolls from the Dead Sea Scrolls concordance, a project that broke the lengthy publication monopoly held on the scrolls. He went on to co-direct the Dead Sea Scrolls Institute at Trinity Western University from 1995 to 2015. Here, Abegg held the Ben Zion Wacholder Professorship. He has been honoured with a collection of essays written by his peers and students.

== Early life and education ==
Martin Abegg is the son of Barbara and Martin Gerald "Jerry" Abegg Sr. He was born in Peoria, Illinois. His mother was a housewife and part-time PE instructor while his father was a college professor, professional engineer and President of Bradley University. In the late 1960s, Abegg performed with his brother Bob in a popular rock band in Peoria, which was signed by Audio Fidelity Records before breaking up. In the early 1970s, the two Abegg brothers continued to perform, finding a niche in the Christian rock music scene.

Abegg graduated from Bradley University in 1972 with a bachelor of science in Geology. After teaching Sunday school inspired him to take language classes, he received a M.Div. degree from Northwest Baptist Seminary in 1983. Later, in 1984, Abegg went on to perform graduate work at the Hebrew University of Jerusalem.

== Career ==
Abegg spent two years teaching Hebrew at the Northwest Baptist Seminary. He also spent one year as a pastor. Abegg taught for three years at Grace Theological Seminary in Winona Lake, Indiana. After this, he moved to British Columbia, where he became a professor of Dead Sea Scrolls Studies at Trinity Western University in Langley. Here, he became co-director of the Dead Sea Scrolls Institute alongside Peter Flint.

=== Dead Sea Scrolls ===
Abegg first became acquainted with the Dead Sea Scrolls during his graduate work at the Hebrew University in Jerusalem. In 1987 he returned to the states, and completed his dissertation at the Hebrew Union College in Cincinnati on the War Scroll from Qumran Cave 1. During his time at the Hebrew Union College, Abegg began to collaborate with Professor Ben Zion Wacholder. John Strugnell, chief editor of the scrolls, had sent Wacholder a copy of the secret concordance of the Dead Sea Scrolls the editors were using at the time. Using this concordance, Abegg created a computerized database for the Dead Sea Scrolls texts. Abegg decided to publish this material while he was completing his dissertation. Though this made Dead Sea Scrolls studies more convenient, Abegg was met with fury. Many influential scholars had been kept away from the materials while the editorial team worked on their first edition of scroll translation. Those who had the privilege of working with the scrolls were angry that their work had been undermined. However, Abegg's publication broke a forty-year monopoly on the scrolls, allowing scholars of all kinds access to examine the artifacts. Furthermore, Abegg's work on the concordance gave him the opportunity to create computer research tools in association with Accordance Bible Software for Dead Sea Scrolls research. Essentially, Abegg's work accelerated Dead Sea Scrolls research.

== Personal life ==
Apart from his career, Abegg's interests include hiking, playing the guitar, and good books and music. He met his wife Susan while hiking in Washington's Olympic Mountains in 1974, they married in 1975, and a decade of farm life and summers mountaineering before deciding to start a family; they had two daughters Steph and Jenny. Abegg currently resides in Chilliwack, British Columbia with his wife, Susan, and two cats Gram and Emmylou.

== Publications ==
- Co-author of The Dead Sea Scrolls: A New Translation (Harper San Francisco, 1996)
- Co-author of The Dead Sea Scrolls Bible (Harper San Francisco, 1999)
- Co-author of Dead Sea Scrolls Concordance I: The Non-Biblical Texts from Qumran (Leiden Brill, 2003)
- Co-author of The Isaiah Scrolls (Clarendon Press Oxford, 2010)
