= Faithlife =

American Bible study software company

Faithlife, LLC
- Formerly: Logos Research Systems, Inc.
- Type: Private
- Industry: Computer software
- Founded: 1992; 34 years ago
- Founder: Bob Pritchett; Dale Pritchett; Kiernon Reiniger
- Headquarters: Bellingham, Washington, United States
- Key people: (CEO, September 2025–present) Chris Migura
- Products: Logos for Education (B2B offering for higher education) Logos for Church (B2B offering for churches); Verbum (Catholic edition of Logos); Proclaim (church presentation software); Biblia.com (free online Bible)
- Number of employees: Approximately 350 (2025) per multiple sources.
- Website: faithlife.com/about

Faithlife is an American software company established in 1992 as Logos Research Systems. It developed Logos Bible Software, a digital platform for Bible study and theological research. The company expanded into Christian digital publishing and software for churches before refocusing its operations on Bible study products. In 2014, it adopted the name Faithlife Corporation, and in the 2020s it renewed its emphasis on the Logos brand.

== History ==
=== Foundation and early development ===
The company's origins date to the development of Logos Bible Software in the early 1990s. Bob Pritchett, Dale Pritchett, and Kiernon Reiniger founded Logos Research Systems in 1992 to develop software for studying the Bible on personal computers. The company's initial product was designed for Microsoft Windows and provided access to digital biblical texts and reference materials.

In 1995, the company released the Logos Library System, which expanded its digital library capabilities. Over the following years, its software developed into a research platform linking Bible translations with commentaries, dictionaries, and other reference works.

=== Expansion into digital publishing and church software ===
During the 2000s and 2010s, the company expanded beyond its original Bible study software. It developed mobile applications, digital book distribution, presentation software for churches, and online services for religious organizations.

In 2011, the company introduced Faithlife Ebooks, a Christian digital book store and reading application. In 2012, it released Proclaim, presentation software designed for church services. It also developed the Faithlife Study Bible and an online community platform.

In September 2014, Logos Bible Software announced that it was changing its corporate name to Faithlife Corporation. The change reflected the company's expanding portfolio of products and services, while Logos Bible Software retained its product name.

Faithlife subsequently introduced services for church websites, online giving, media distribution, and church administration. The company also expanded its publishing activities and developed resources for biblical and theological education.

=== Acquisitions ===
In September 2020, Faithlife acquired Wordsearch Bible from LifeWay Christian Resources. The acquisition brought Wordsearch's software and digital resources into Faithlife's product ecosystem, with the intention of transitioning users and their content to Logos.

In the same year, Faithlife acquired Servant Keeper, a church management software product. In 2021, it acquired Go to the Hub, a service associated with church curriculum and discipleship resources.

=== Ownership and leadership changes ===
In 2020, Faithlife sold a majority stake to Cove Hill Partners, a private investment firm.

In January 2022, co-founder Bob Pritchett stepped down as chief executive officer and became executive chairman. Vik Rajagopal, previously the company's chief financial officer, succeeded him as CEO.

In October 2022, Faithlife announced a strategic shift away from parts of its church management business to concentrate on Bible study software and digital content. The company discontinued parts of Faithlife Equip and reduced its emphasis on providing a comprehensive suite of church administration services.

Bill McCarthy became CEO in February 2024. In September 2025, Chris Migura succeeded McCarthy, who became chair of the company's board.

=== Renewed emphasis on the Logos brand ===
In June 2023, the company stated that it would place greater emphasis on the Logos brand in its public-facing business. Faithlife would continue to be used in corporate contexts, while Logos would be the principal brand presented to customers of its Bible study platform.

This repositioning accompanied a narrower product strategy focused on individual Bible students, pastors, academics, and educational institutions. The company's earlier church administration products were no longer the central focus of its business.

== Products and services ==
=== Logos ===
Logos is the company's principal Bible study platform. It provides access to digital Bible translations, commentaries, dictionaries, scholarly books, and other reference works. Its tools support searching, cross-referencing, original-language analysis, note-taking, and the preparation of sermons and Bible studies.

In October 2024, Logos introduced a revised subscription model alongside continued access to previously purchased digital resources. The platform subsequently incorporated artificial intelligence features, including natural-language search and tools for summarizing selected resources and assisting with study preparation.

=== Verbum ===
Verbum is a version of the Logos platform intended for Catholic biblical and theological study. It includes resources relevant to Catholic traditions and tools for researching Scripture and related theological literature.

=== Proclaim ===
Proclaim is presentation software designed for church services. It supports the preparation and display of presentation materials for congregational worship and related events.

=== Biblia ===
Biblia is an online Bible resource associated with the company's digital Bible study ecosystem. It provides access to biblical texts through a web interface.

=== Former products and services ===
Faithlife previously operated a wider range of products for churches and Christian communities, including website hosting, online giving, church management tools, and digital media services. Its strategic changes beginning in 2022 reduced the role of these services in the company's overall business.

== Publishing ==
Faithlife developed a digital publishing operation that produced biblical and theological resources for use in Logos and other formats. Its publishing activities included Lexham Press, which published scholarly books, pastoral resources, and other Christian literature.

On 23 September 2025, Baker Publishing Group announced that it had acquired Lexham Press. The transaction transferred the publishing imprint to Baker while Logos retained digital rights to Lexham content for use in its digital library.

== See also ==
- Logos Bible Software
- Bible software
- Digital library
- Christian publishing
