= Bobby Gruenewald =

American pastor at Life.Church

- Born: July 31, 1976 (age 49); Decatur, Illinois, United States

Bobby Gruenewald (born July 31, 1976) is the Pastor and Innovation Leader at Life.Church, a multisite church based in Oklahoma. He is also the founder of the YouVersion Bible App and a former entrepreneur, making and selling two multi-million dollar online companies.

Bobby Gruenewald
- Religion: Christianity (Protestant)
- Church: Life Church

== Early life ==
Gruenewald grew up in Decatur, Illinois. He graduated in 1994 from Stephen Decatur High School. While in high school, he started and performed in a Christian rap groupcalled Christ B4 Everything. He met his wife Melissa in elementary school, and moved to Oklahoma when she decided to, so that he could be with her. He earned a bachelor's degree in finance from Southern Nazarene University. In 2015, Southern Nazarene awarded Gruenewald an honorary doctorate.

== Career ==
After college, Gruenewald started and sold two technology companies and served as an advisor for multiple startups and venture capital funds. Gruenewald gave a TED Talk on innovation and the use of technology in the church. He also contributed a monthly column to Outreach Magazine for seven years. Gruenewald also serves on the board of directors for OneHope and the Museum of the Bible.

=== Companies ===
Bobby Gruenewald founded and ran two major companies. He first created a web hosting company, which later sold for an undisclosed amount in the millions. He then created the largest WWE fan site at the time, with games and online chat rooms for fans. The WWE website also later sold for an undisclosed amount in the millions. He currently serves on boards of several organizations and non-profits.

=== Life.Church ===
Gruenewald joined the Life.Church staff in 2001. Working with Senior Pastor Craig Groeschel, Gruenewald helped launch MySecret.tv in 2006, an online forum that allows users to anonymously confess secrets. When asked about the motivation behind the initiative, Gruenewald said, “We believe that if we confess to one another, healing can begin.” Life.Church launched an Internet Campus, now known as Church Online, in 2006. Church Online allows people around the globe to attend services that feature worship music, biblical teaching, live chat interaction, and one-on-one prayer through a private chat. One year later, Gruenewald oversaw the launch of a fully interactive church location in Second Life, the 3-D online virtual world. Gruenewald also oversees the development and management of Life.Church Open Network, which offers free resources and tools to churches around the world.

=== YouVersion ===
In 2007, Gruenewald came up with the idea for the YouVersion Bible App. He said, “I thought about how Gutenberg’s invention revolutionized the accessibility and distribution of Bibles hundreds of years ago, and wondered how technology might be able to do something similar for our generation.” The Bible App was one of the first 200 free apps available when the App Store launched in July 2008 and the first Bible to be featured. The app reached more than 80,000 downloads in its first weekend, and it has since been downloaded in every country of the world on hundreds of millions of devices and now is approaching 1 billion total downloads.

== Personal life ==
Gruenewald lives in Edmond, Oklahoma with his wife, Melissa (m. 1996), and their four children. He is close friends with many religious figures, and loves to travel with his family.

== Honors and awards ==
In 2011, Gruenewald was named to Fast Company's list of the Most Creative People in Business. Wycliffe Bible Translators awarded Gruenewald the Scripture Impact Award in 2014. He also received the 2014 Salt and Light Award from the Christian Business Men's Committee of Oklahoma City. That same year, Gruenewald met Pope Francis and presented him with a gold iPhone installed with the Bible App and the Bible App for Kids.
