= The Kneeling Christian =

Book by Albert Ernest Richardson

- Title page for The Kneeling Christian (originally published under the authorship of "An Unknown Christian")
- Author: Albert Ernest Richardson
- Publisher: Hendrickson Publishers
- ISBN: 978-1-59856-002-2

The Kneeling Christian is a book written by Albert Ernest Richardson, who authored the book under the pseudonym "Unknown Christian".

== Authorship ==
The author mentions visiting Pandita Ramabai's work while being in India which indicates that the book was written sometime between the 1920s and the early 1930s. The Preface to the book in Hendrickson Christian Classics Edition mentions that according to the records of the British Library:

the "Unknown Christian" was an Anglican clergyman named Albert Ernest Richardson, who was born around 1868. He was educated at the University of Oxford, ordained as a priest in 1897, and in 1898 he was accepted as a missionary and left for the Hausaland Mission in Africa... He returned to England in 1900, only to turn around in 1903 and go out again, this time to serve in Bombay, India, until 1905. Following his return from India, Richardson's passion for evangelism was channeled into his career with the Church Army, a society of evangelists with the Anglican Communion. Then he began publishing his writings in 1921. The Kneeling Christian was his second book.

The Unknown Christian in this book mentions his experiences in India:

A few years ago, when in India, I had the great joy of seeing something of Pandita Ramabai’s work. She had a boarding-school of 1,500 Hindu girls. One day some of these girls came with their Bibles and asked a lady missionary what St. Luke xii. 49 meant—“I came to cast fire upon the earth; and what will I, if it is already kindled?” The missionary tried to put them off with an evasive answer, not being very sure herself what those words meant. But they were not satisfied, so they determined to pray for this fire. And as they prayed—and because they prayed—the very fire of heaven came into their souls. A very Pentecost from above was granted them. No wonder they continued to pray!

== Reception ==
The book has been reprinted many times and has been included in many study guides and derivative works including:

- Unknown Christian; Albert E. Richardson (1967). The Kneeling Christian. London.
- Unknown Christian (1986). The Kneeling Christian. Zondervan. ISBN 978-0-310-33491-0.
- Unknown Christian (2006). The Kneeling Christian. Hendrickson Publishers. ISBN 978-1-59856-002-2.
- Unknown Christian (2012). Kneeling Christian. ReadHowYouWant.com. ISBN 978-1-4587-9702-5.
- Unknown Christian (2013). Kneeling Christian. Whitaker Distributors. ISBN 978-1-60374-843-8.

In addition, a number of works have been based on or derived from The Kneeling Christian, including:

- Eternal Word Publishing (2003). Daily Meditations for the Kneeling Christian. NiOse Communications Company. ISBN 978-0-9717551-0-9.
- Ronnie Floyd (2011). Our Last Great Hope: Awakening the Great Commission. Thomas Nelson Inc. pp. 225–. ISBN 978-0-8499-4952-4.
- Gary Neal Hansen (2012). Kneeling with Giants with Complimentary Kneeling with Giants Reader: Learning to Pray with History's Best Teachers. InterVarsity Press. ISBN 978-0-8308-6984-8.
- Fred Bittner (2012). The Kneeling Christian for Small Groups: Classic Duet Series. 2t2 Ministries. ISBN 978-0-9856992-3-9.
- John Bunyan; Brother Lawrence; Andrew Murray; R A Torrey; Thomas A Kempis; Charles Sheldon; Anonymous (2013). Hendrickson Christian Classics Audio Library. Hendrickson Publishers. ISBN 978-1-61970-062-8.
- Biblical software packages such as Accordance
