= STEP Library =

STEP (Standard Template for Electronic Publishing) is a standard file format used to distribute Biblical software from various publishers. STEP was conceived in 1995 by Craig Rairdin of Parsons Technology and Jim VanDuzer of Loizeaux Brothers Publishers. Rairdin and VanDuzer formed a consortium of Biblical software publishers called the Bible Software Industry Standards Group (BSISG) to oversee the development of the STEP specification and to develop common tools to be used by developers and publishers interested in implementing STEP compatibility in their programs or publishing books in the STEP format.

The STEP logo was originally a trademark of Parsons Technology, Inc., now of FindEx, Inc., the current publisher of QuickVerse Bible Software.

== Format specification ==
The files use Microsoft's Rich Text Format (RTF) with special STEP tags added.

While not fully open format, as was sometimes claimed, the specifications have been publicly released, enabling third parties to write their own tools to create, edit, or view STEP resources. There are restrictions on the use of the logo, and commercial use of the term "STEP Compatible". Findex distributed The STEP Publisher's Toolkit as part of their license. It is similar to The Libronix Digital Library, for users of Biblical software wanting integration of various reference works, using a common application to access and cross-reference various works from various publishers.

== Bible study software ==
The following biblical software can read STEP files:

- e-Sword;
- QuickVerse 5.0 through 2009;
- WORDsearch 4.0 and 5.0;

The following companies also issued resources in STEP format:

- Ages Library from 1997 to 2000;
- Bible Companion from 1995 to 2002;
- Ephesians Four Group (current issuer);
- Light By Design (current issuer);
- NavPress from 1995 to 2003;
- Certain of Zondervan's software titles 1995–2001, including their own STEP Reader (which was in fact a rebranded Quickverse Library) which ran independently of their own Reference Software suite;
