= MECS =

MECS is the Multi-Element Code System, a markup system developed by the Wittgenstein Archives at the University of Bergen. It is very similar to SGML and XML except that it allows elements to overlap.

MECS supports limited overlap, in that a given type of element (for example a quotation), may overlap other types, but no element may overlap another of the same type.

MECS has been influential in the theory of non-hierarchical markup systems, and is discussed in many articles by Michael Sperberg-McQueen and Claus Huitfeldt, among others.

Other systems for representing overlapping markup include the Layered Markup and Annotation Language, CLIX, JITTS, EARMARK and features of the Text Encoding Initiative and the Open Scripture Information Standard.

== See also ==
- Markup overlap
