= OLB =

OLB may stand for:

- Oh Lord Buddha - Quotes related to Buddhism
- Olbia - Costa Smeralda Airport, IATA airport code
- Outside linebacker, a defensive position in American and Canadian football
- Object Language Bindings (SQL/OLB) - a standard for embedding SQL in Java
- Oldenburgische Landesbank - a German bank
- Online Bible
- Overpass Light Brigade - Series of illuminated (LED) signs used by activists and others. Each letter is held by a different person.
- Operation London Bridge
- Our Lady of the Bay Catholic High School, A Catholic High School In Collingwood, Ontario, Canada
