= The SWORD Project =

Software project by CrossWire Bible Society'

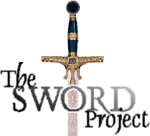

The SWORD Project is the CrossWire Bible Society's free software project. Its purpose is to create cross-platform open-source tools—covered by the GNU General Public License—that allow programmers and Bible societies to write new Bible software more quickly and easily.

== Overview ==
The core of The SWORD Project is a cross-platform library written in C++, providing access, search functions and other utilities to a growing collection of over 200 texts in over 50 languages. Any software based on their API can use this collection.

JSword is a separate implementation, written in Java, which reproduces most of the API features of the C++ API and supports most SWORD data content.

The project is one of the primary implementers of and contributors to the Open Scripture Information Standard (OSIS), a standardized XML language for the encoding of scripture. The software is also capable of utilizing certain resources encoded in using the Text Encoding Initiative (TEI) format and maintains deprecated support for Theological Markup Language (ThML) and General Bible Format (GBF).

== Bible study front-end applications ==
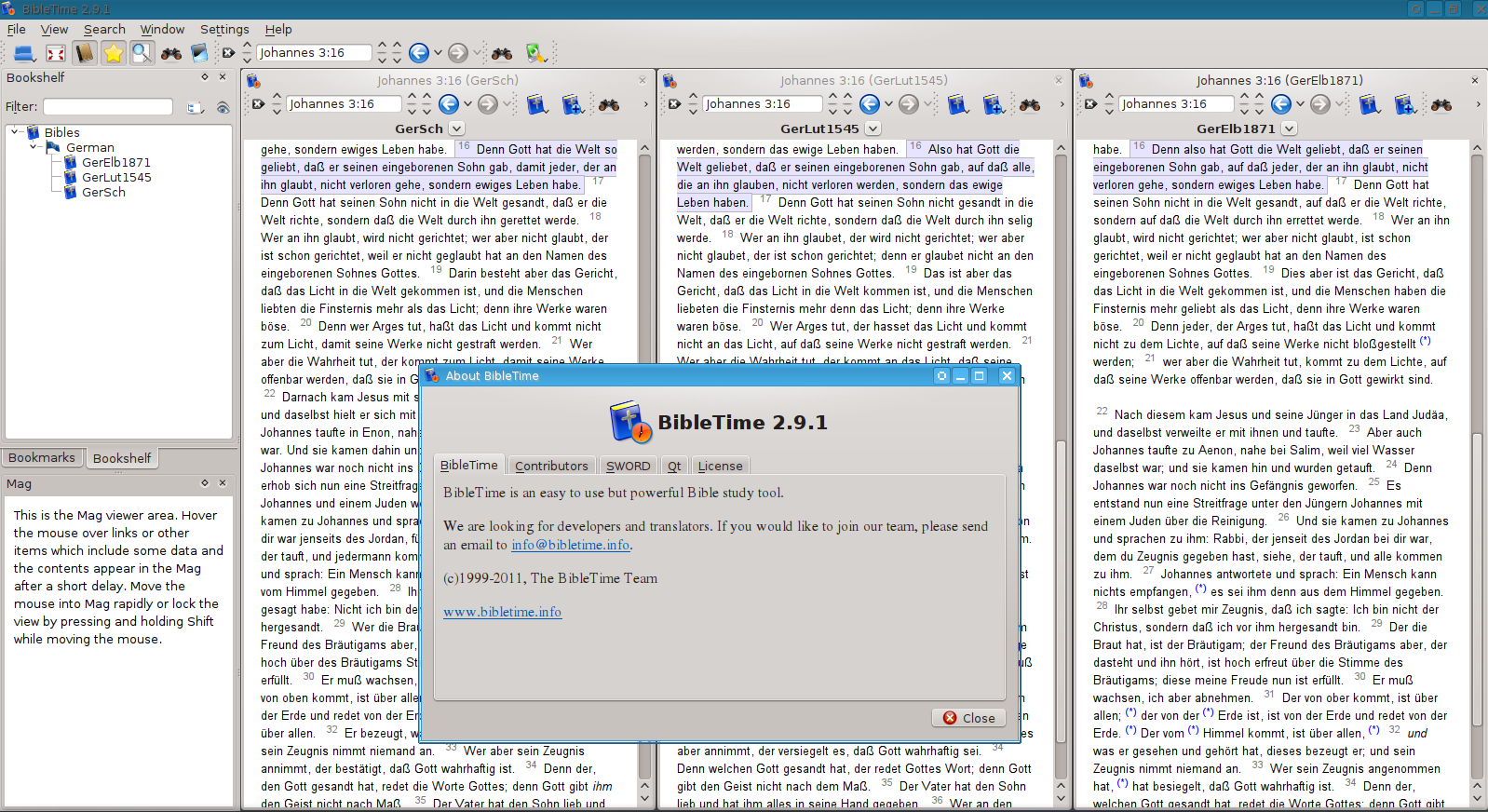
BibleTime 2.9 on Fedora 16

A variety of front ends based on The SWORD Project are available:

=== And Bible ===
And Bible, based on JSword, is an Android application.

=== Alkitab Bible Study ===
Alkitab Bible Study, based on JSword, is a multiplatform application with binaries available for Windows, Linux, and OS X. It has been described as "an improved Windows front-end for JSword".

=== The Bible Tool ===
The Bible Tool is a web front end to SWORD. One instance of the tool is hosted at CrossWire's own site.

=== BibleDesktop ===
BibleDesktop is built on JSword featuring binaries for Windows (98SE and later), OS X, and Linux (and other Unix-like OSes).

=== BibleTime ===
BibleTime is a C++ SWORD front end using the Qt GUI toolkit, with binaries for Linux, Windows, FreeBSD, and OS X.

=== BibleTime Mini ===
BibleTime Mini is a multiplatform application for Android, BlackBerry, jailbroken iOS, MeeGo, Symbian, and Windows Mobile.

=== BPBible ===
BPBible is a SWORD front end written in Python, which supports Linux and Windows. A notable feature is that a PortableApps version of BPBible is available.

=== Eloquent ===
Eloquent
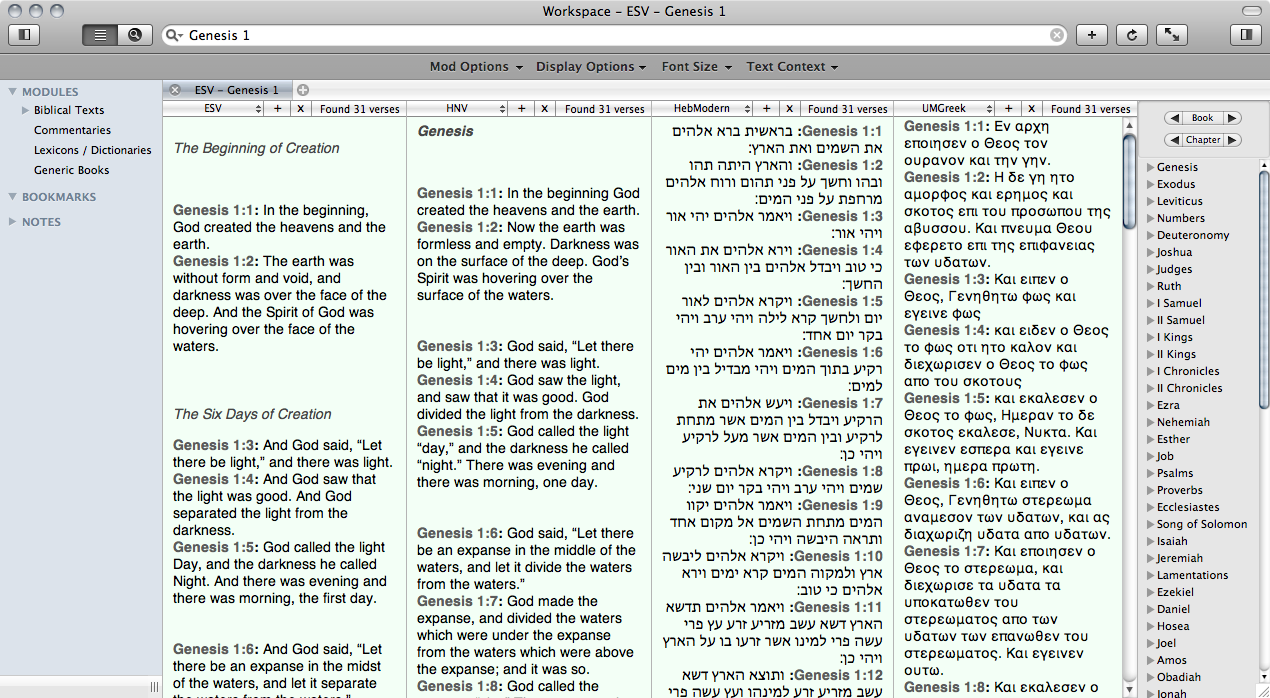
- Eloquent running on Mac OS X Snow Leopard with four different panes open.
- Developer: Manfred Bergman
- Stable release: 2.6.6 / 2021-01-03
- Preview release: Non [±]
- Written in: Objective-C
- Operating system: macOS
- Available in: Multilingual
- Type: Biblical software
- License: BSD License
- Repository: https://github.com/mdbergmann/Eloquent

Eloquent (formerly MacSword) is a free open-source application for research and study of the Bible, developed specifically for Macintosh computers running macOS. It is a native OS X app built in Objective-C. Eloquent allows users to read and browse different bible translations in many languages, devotionals, commentaries, dictionaries and lexicons. It also supports searching and advanced features such as services enabling users to access the Bible within other application programs.

Eloquent is one of About.com's top 10 Bible programs.

Version 2.3.5 of Eloquent continues with the Snow Leopard development. However, starting with the version 2.4.0, Eloquent has started with the OS X Lion testing, implementing features that are specific only to the Lion operating system.

Release notes
	Version	Release date	Features
2.3.3	June 15, 2011	Added spell checking context menu to notes display. It is now possible to add unknown words to the Mac OS X dictionary.; Preview Pane now shows text as HTML rendered instead of plain text.; Fixed problem where Eloquent did not honor the individual module font setting.	
2.3.5	July 16, 2011	Fixed footnotes display in tooltip and preview pane; updated version SWORD and module development utilities	

=== Ezra Bible App ===
Ezra Bible App is an open source bible study tool focussing on topical study based on keywords/tags. It is based on Electron and works on Windows, Linux, macOS and Android.

=== FireBible ===
FireBible is a Firefox extension that works on Windows, Linux, and OS X.

=== PocketSword ===
PocketSword is an iOS front end supporting iPad, iPhone, and iPod Touch available in Apple's App Store.

=== STEPBible ===
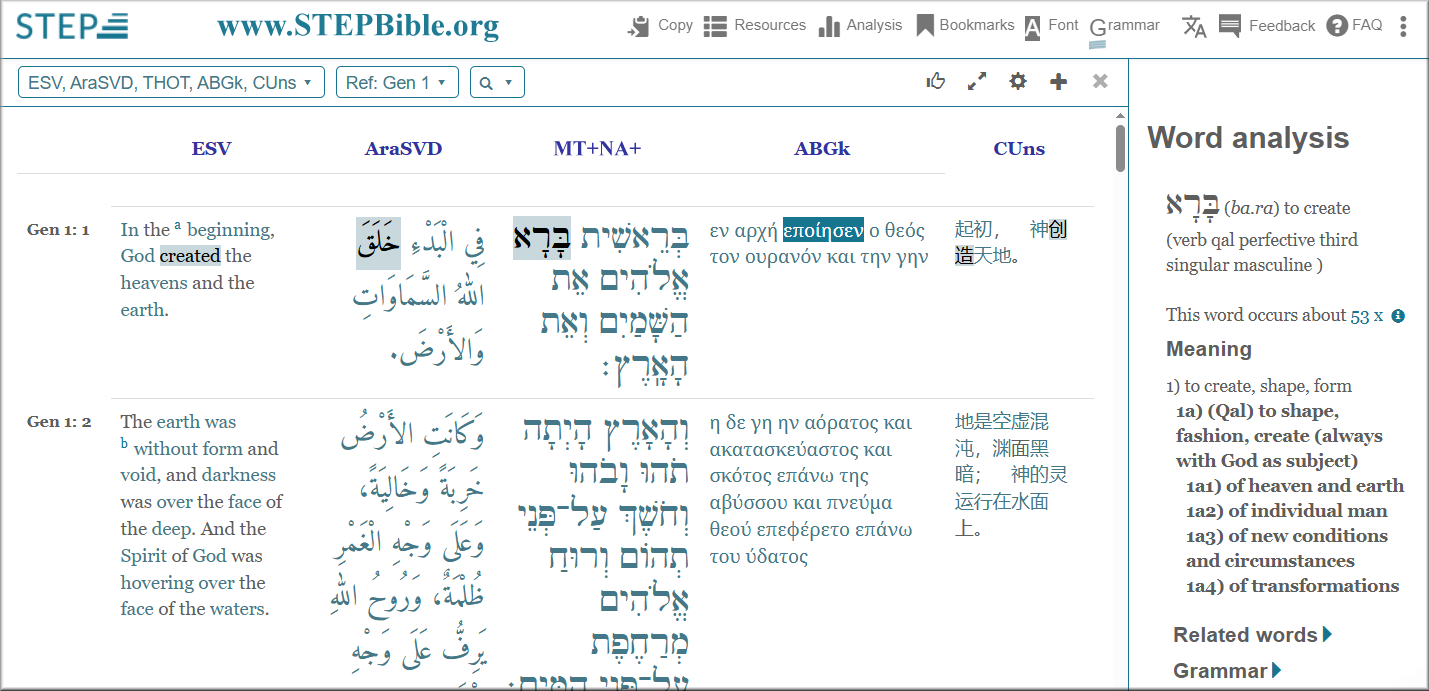
Greek, Hebrew, Arabic, Chinese & English aligned at STEPBible.org

STEPBible (STEP - Scripture Tools for Every Person) is an initiative started by Tyndale House, Cambridge to build an online Bible study tool based on The SWORD Project. The first public release (Beta launch) of the software as an online platform was on 25 July 2013. The web version runs in any desktop or mobile browser and it can be installed on desktop computers. All code and data created for the project are open source.

=== The SWORD Project for Windows ===
The SWORD Project for Windows (known internally as BibleCS) is a Windows application built in C++Builder.

=== Xiphos ===
Xiphos (formerly GnomeSword) is a C++ SWORD front end using GTK+, with binaries available for Linux, UNIX, and Windows (2000 and later). It has been described as "a top-of-the-line Bible study program."

=== xulsword ===
xulsword is a XUL-based front end for Windows and Linux. Portable versions of the application, intended to be run from a USB stick, are also available.

=== Others ===
Additional front ends to SWORD exist to support a number of legacy and niche platforms, including:

- diatheke (CLI & CGI)
- SwordReader (Windows Mobile)
- Rapier (Maemo)

== Reviews ==
- It is one of About.com's top 10 bible programs.
- Bible Software Review, Review of MacSword version 1.2, June 13, 2005.
- Foster Tribe SwordBible Review , November 25, 2008
- Michael Hansen, Studying the Bible for Free, Stimulus, Volume 12 Number 3, August 2004, pp. 33-38

== See also ==
- Biblical software
- Go Bible – a free Bible viewer for the Java ME platform
- Palm Bible Plus – a free Bible viewer for Palm OS
- List of free and open-source software packages
