= SABDA =

Indonesian Bible study software

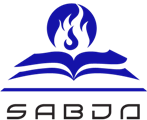
SABDA's Logo

SABDA or SABDA Bible Software is an Indonesian integrated Bible study platform based on the Online Bible engine, with multilingual Bibles available in the program (including Indonesian, Malay, English, Greek and Hebrew, and many local languages of Indonesia).

The word sabda is the Indonesian word for Logos (via Sanskrit: shabda), and also an abbreviation of "Software Alkitab, Biblika Dan Alat-alat" (Bible Software, Biblical Resources, And Tools). It is produced and managed by Yayasan Lembaga SABDA (SABDA Foundation) which translated and made available freely more than 100 Biblical modules in Indonesian since 1994, besides the default OLB modules.

Since its initial beginning in the 1990s, the SABDA Software has been made available as a free downloadable program with many Indonesian Bible translations (text and audio) and biblical resources (including pastoral electronic library), and many more Biblical tools (including advanced search, footnotes, interlinear, concordances, cross references, maps, lexicons, dictionaries, etc.), as well as SABDA's web-based versions of online Bible study websites (in English and Indonesian) which are called SABDAweb and SABDA Alkitab

One of many things that sets SABDA apart from the rest of the Bible software is its use of the historical Bible translations into the languages of Indonesia and Malaysia as parallel versions to its modern counterpart. The organization have been distributing the software gratis and encouraged others to copy and distribute the software themselves non-commercially.

== See also ==
- Online Bible
- Biblical software
- Study Bible
