= YouVersion =

Technology ministry of Life.Church known for the Bible App

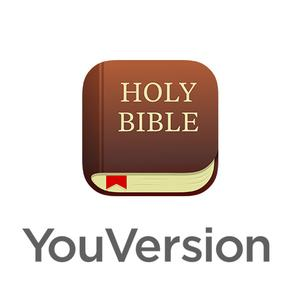
- Available in: English, Spanish and at least 65 languages for the interface, Bible content in 2243 languages
- Owner: Life.Church
- Website: www.youversion.com
- Registration: Optional
- Launched: 2007; 19 years ago

YouVersion (also known as Bible.com or the Bible App) is an online and mobile Bible platform published for web, Android, iOS, Windows Phone, and many other operating platforms.

In 2023, according to YouVersion, its Bible App featured over 3,000 Bible versions in over 2,000 languages, audio Bibles, offline capabilities, as well as over 800 Bible plans and devotionals.

== History ==
YouVersion was founded as a website in 2007 and one of the first phone apps in 2008 by Bobby Gruenewald and Life.Church. Since at least 2012, it has been sponsored by David Green, the billionaire founder and owner of Hobby Lobby Stores, Inc. In April 2014, YouVersion released version 5 of the Bible App, which added features for community engagement and scripture discussion. In April 2016, The Bible App became available on the Apple Watch allowing users to read the Verse of the Day, view trending verses, and access their own Verse Images, Bookmarks, and Highlights. By April 2017, YouVersion had been downloaded over 268 million times and offered 1492 versions of the Bible in 1074 languages. In March 2017, YouVersion launched a service using Google Assistant on Google Home devices, enabling users to request Bible verses based on their moods and emotions. In November 2021, YouVersion reached 500 million downloads. By 2025, the number of installs had reached nearly one billion.

== Criticism ==
YouVersion has been accused of over-collecting data from its users since 2013. As recently as 2019, the Android version of the app was requiring access to all the user's contact information (their address book) as well as the user's GPS location. YouVersion has updated their privacy policies as of April 2, 2022.

YouVersion came under criticism in 2026 for continuing to host The Passion Translation following its removal from Bible Gateway in 2022. A Change.org petition, initiated by researcher David Fish and supported by over 12,000 signatories, called on YouVersion to remove the work after documented evidence emerged of widespread plagiarism, fabricated translation credentials, and unattributed copying from existing English paraphrases. Scholars including Dr. Mark Strauss, vice-chair of the NIV translation committee, and Dr. Craig Blomberg, who described the Passion Translation as deserving "a surgeon general's warning," added their voices to the criticism. YouVersion has not publicly responded to the petition or the underlying allegations directly though added a in app note that quoted BroadStreet Publishing "This Bible version is currently in an expanded review process".
