= SwordSearcher =

- Developer: StudyLamp Software
- Stable release: 9.1.1.24114 / February 12, 2024; 20 months ago
- Operating system: Windows
- Type: Bible study application
- License: Proprietary
- Website: SwordSearcher.com

SwordSearcher is a Bible software package that runs on Windows.

== History ==
SwordSearcher was originally written for MS-DOS in 1994 by Brandon Staggs under the name Bible Assistant. When Windows 95 was released, version 3 was released as a Windows program called SwordSearcher 95 and was apparently the first 32 bit Windows Bible Software available.

A port to the Mac OS was started but was later canceled.

A SwordSearcher module compiler, called Forge, is available.

== Reviews and awards ==
In 2007, 2008, and 2009, SwordSearcher was awarded the Shareware Industry Awards People's Choice for Best Hobby or Personal Interest software.

It is one of About.com's top 10 bible programs.
