= Olive Tree Bible Software =

Religious electronic publisher

- Industry: Software
- Genre: e-books, digital library, Bible study
- Founded: 2000
- Headquarters: Spokane, Washington
- Products: Bibles, commentaries, devotionals, Greek and Hebrew tools, Bible dictionaries, Christian eBooks for computers
- Website: www.olivetree.com

The Bible Study App
- Original author: Olive Tree Bible Software
- Stable release: 6.0.16.1875 / September 15, 2015; 10 years ago
- Operating system: Microsoft Windows, Macintosh, iOS, Android
- Platform: Windows 10, Macintosh OS X 10.10, iPhone, iPad, iPod Touch, Android Tablet/Phone, Kindle Fire
- Available in: English
- Type: Biblical software
- License: Olive Tree License
- Website: olivetree.com

Olive Tree Bible Software creates Biblical software and mobile apps, and is an electronic publisher of Bible versions, study tools, Bible study tools, and Christian eBooks for mobile, tablet, and desktop devices. The firm is headquartered in Spokane, Washington and is a member of the Evangelical Christian Publishers Association (ECPA). Olive Tree currently supports Android, iPad, iPhone, Macintosh, Windows, and personal computer devices.

== History ==
In 1984, Drew Haninger began development via a student project on a monochrome personal computer.

During the 1980s and 1990s, engineering was focused on a multilingual word processor and programs for searching the Bible.

In August 1998, the first BibleReader(TM) was released for Palm OS.

In 1999, the BibleReader for Pocket PC, running the Windows Mobile operating system, was released.

The company continued to grow and, in 2000 assumed the name Olive Tree Bible Software.

As the mobile device market continued to expand, the BibleReader was released for Android, BlackBerry, iOS (iPhone, iPod Touch, iPad) Smartphones, and Symbian operating systems.

As of 2011, Olive Tree had over 20 employees. In November 2011, Olive Tree announced the release of BibleReader for Mac. In December 2011, the Windows PC version was released.

On 5 May 2014, HarperCollins announced it had acquired Olive Tree, with Drew Haninger moving to an advisory role.

On 11 September 2020, Gospel Technologies, owned by Olive Tree's Vice President of Operations Steven Cummings, acquired Olive Tree from HarperCollins.

== Bible+ ==
Olive Tree is best known for its Bible+ application (formerly called BibleReader), a software tool designed for reading and searching electronic books. Recent enhancements include bookmarks, personal notes, highlighting, and auto-scrolling. Font sizes, colors, and the application display can be customized. Bible+ uses a markup language called Olive Tree Markup Language (OTML).

== Bible resources ==
Olive Tree Bible Software provides a broad catalogue of over 1000 Bible resources, including audio Bibles, Bibles, commentaries, dictionaries, devotionals, ebooks, multimedia, and Strong's numbering system. Some of the most notable resources include the Amplified Bible (AMP), Authorized King James Version (KJV), Darby Bible (DBY), English Standard Version (ESV), The ESV Study Bible (ESVSB), Holman Christian Standard Bible (HCSB), New American Standard Bible (NASB), New International Version (NIV), New King James Version (NKJV), New Living Translation (NLT), NLT Study Bible, and New Revised Standard Version (NRSV).

=== Languages ===
Bibles are also available in various languages, including English, French, German, and Spanish. Ancient language resources include: the Novum Testamentum Graece (NA27) Greek New Testament with morphological information and UBS dictionary; the Biblia Hebraica Stuttgartensia, the Hebrew and Aramaic Old Testament/Hebrew Bible with the Groves-Wheeler Westminster Hebrew Morphology and an abridged BDB dictionary; the Qumran (non-biblical) texts with morphological information, lexical glosses, and an abridged BDB dictionary; and the Septuagint with morphological information and the LEH dictionary.

=== Publishers ===
Olive Tree has continued to work with several Christian publishers, such as AMG International, Baker Publishing Group, Eerdmans, Good News Publishers, Moody Publishers, Thomas Nelson, and Zondervan.

=== Authors ===
Olive Tree offers resources by several recent authors, including Gary Chapman, Mark Dever, Wayne Grudem, John F. MacArthur, Beth Moore, John Piper, R. C. Sproul, Chuck Swindoll, and Rick Warren, and the classic authors John Calvin and Matthew Henry.
