= Albert Richardson (priest) =

Albert Ernest Richardson (born c. 1868) was educated at Oxford High School, London City Technical College and the University of Oxford obtaining a B.A in 1894, M.A. in 1897 and B.D. in 1901.

He initially offered his services as a missionary to the CMS in 1895 but this was deferred. He was ordained as a deacon in 1896 and as a priest in 1897 and between 1896 and 1898 was curate of St Clement's, Ipswich. In 1898 he was accepted as missionary and left for Lagos and then went overland to Tripoli as a member of the pioneer missionary party to Hausaland, Nigeria led by Bishop Herbert Tugwell. In 1902 again offered his services to the CMS and this time was accepted and in 1903 he went to Bombay.

== Published works ==
He is reputed to be the author of The Kneeling Christian, which he wrote anonymously. His other works include:

- Hausaland and the Gospel. Church Missionary Society. 1901.
- How to Live the Victorious Life. London, Edinburgh. 1921. ISBN 978-1-258-46040-2.
- How to Know God: Meditations on the Secret of His Presence. Fleming H. Revell Company. 1929.
