= Open Scripture Information Standard =

- Filename extension: xml
- Latest release: 2.1.1; 2006; 20 years ago
- Website: crosswire.org/osis/

Open Scripture Information Standard (OSIS) is an XML application (or schema), that defines tags for marking up Bibles, theological commentaries, and other related literature.

== Description ==
The schema is very similar to that of the Text Encoding Initiative, though on the one hand much simpler (by omission of many unneeded constructs), and on the other hand adding much more detailed metadata, and a formal canonical reference system to identify books, chapters, verses, and particular locations within verses.

The metadata includes a "work declaration" for the work itself, and for each work it references. A work declaration provides basic catalog information based on the Dublin Core standard, and assigns a local short name for the work (similar to XML namespace declarations).

=== Significant Features ===
OSIS gives particular attention to encoding overlapping markup, because Bibles exhibit such markup frequently, for example verses crossing paragraph boundaries and vice versa. The OSIS schema introduced a method for encoding overlap in XML, known as Trojan milestones, or "Clix".

== Development ==
The OSIS schema was developed by the Bible Technologies Group, a joint committee sponsored by the American Bible Society and the Society of Biblical Literature. Other participants in the standards work are the United Bible Societies, SIL International, and various national Bible societies, along with individual expert volunteers.

The officers include Steven DeRose (chair), Kees DeBlois (vice-chair), and Patrick Durusau (editor). As of mid-2006, the current version is 2.1.1.

== See also ==
- Theological Markup Language (ThML)
- Go Bible – application for Java mobile phones
- The SWORD Project – a Bible software platform that supports the OSIS standard
