= Craig Groeschel =

American pastor (born 1967)

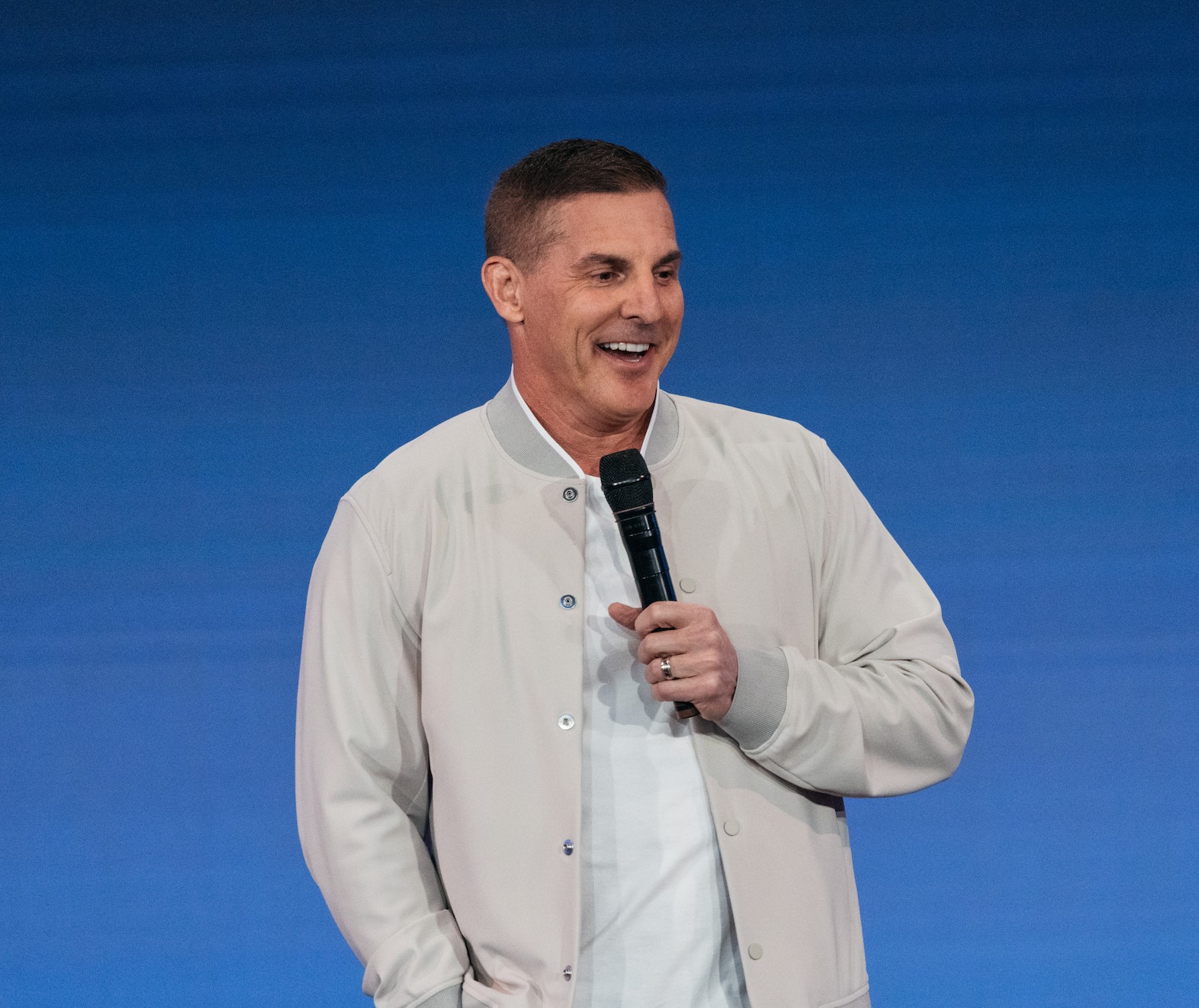
- Born: December 2, 1967 (age 58); Houston, Texas
- Occupations: Minister, author, speaker
- Writing career
- Subjects: Leadership; Christian growth
- Website: craiggroeschel.com

Craig Groeschel (born December 2, 1967) is an American minister, author, and speaker who is the founder and senior pastor of Life.Church, an American evangelical multi-site church with locations in 12 U.S. states.

== Early life and education ==
Groeschel grew up in southern Oklahoma, attending Ardmore High School. After high school, he attended Oklahoma City University on a tennis scholarship and was a member of the Lambda Chi Alpha fraternity. He earned a bachelor's degree in Marketing. He met his wife Amy at OCU and the two married in 1991. That same year, Groeschel entered the ministry as an associate pastor in the United Methodist Church. He attended Phillips Theological Seminary, which is affiliated with the Christian Church (Disciples of Christ) and earned a Master of Divinity degree. He was an associate pastor at First United Methodist Church in Oklahoma City at the time of the 1995 Oklahoma City Bombing.

== Pastoral career ==
In 1996, Groeschel and a handful of people started Life Covenant Church in a two-car garage. He later told Business Week that he started the process by performing market research of non-churchgoers and designed his church in response to what he learned about people's preconceptions about boring church experiences. Groeschel's approach was successful and attendance grew rapidly, eventually resulting in Life.Church becoming one of the largest Protestant churches in the United States with 46 physical Life.Church locations as of 2025.

Groeschel began using videos to deliver some of his sermons beginning in 2001, discovering that the videos were popular with churchgoers. In 2006, he set up a website called Mysecret.tv as a place for people to confess anonymously on the Internet. Groeschel also began delivering services to the Second Life virtual world on Easter Sunday 2007.

Life.Church's YouVersion Bible app, developed by the church's technology team, achieved 1 billion downloads as of November 2025.

== Personal life ==
Groeschel is married to Amy and has six children and seven grandchildren. They live in Edmond, Oklahoma, a suburb of Oklahoma City, where Life.Church is based.

== Business ==
Groeschel served on the Board of Directors of Gulfport Energy Corporation. Groeschel's 2016 compensation was a grant of 3,824 equity shares on June 10, 2016 with a value of $125,006.56 at close of business that day. On December 15, 2017, Groeschel sold 7,059 shares of Gulfport Energy stock for $85,837 according to SEC filings. In November 2019, Gulfport Energy announced Groeschel's resignation from the board.

== Bibliography ==
- Chazown: A Different Way to See Your Life (2006) ISBN 1-59052-547-7
- Confessions of a Pastor (2006) ISBN 1-59052-720-8
- Going All the Way: Preparing for a Marriage That Goes the Distance (2007) ISBN 1-59052-938-3
- It – How Churches and Leaders Can Get It and Keep It (2008) ISBN 0-310-28682-4
- The Christian Atheist: Believing in God but Living as if He Doesn't Exist (2010) ISBN 0-310-32789-X
- Dare To Drop The Pose (2010) ISBN 978-1601423146
- Weird: Because Normal Isn't Working (2011) ISBN 0-310-32790-3
- Love, Sex, and Happily Ever After (2011) ISBN 978-1601423696
- Soul Detox: Clean Living in a Contaminated World (2012) ISBN 0-310-33368-7
- Altar Ego: Becoming Who God Says You Are (2013) ISBN 0-310-33371-7
- Fight: Winning the Battles that Matter Most (2013) ISBN 0-310-33374-1
- From this Day Forward: Five Commitments To Fail-Proof Your Marriage (2014) ISBN 978-0-310-33748-5
- #Struggles: Following Jesus in a Selfie-centered World (2015) ISBN 978-0-310-34293-9
- Divine Direction: 7 decisions that will change your life (2017) ISBN 978-0-310-34283-0
- Hope in the Dark : Believing God is good when life is not (2018) ISBN 978-0-310-34295-3
- Dangerous Prayers: Because Following Jesus Was Never Meant To Be Safe (2020) ISBN 0-310-34312-7
- Winning The War In Your Mind: Change Your Thinking, Change Your Life (2021) ISBN 978-0-310-36272-2
- Lead Like It Matters: 7 Leadership Principles For A Church That Lasts (2022) ISBN 0-310-36283-0
- The Power to Change: Mastering the Habits That Matter Most (2023) ISBN 978-0-310-36277-7
