= MyBible =

- MyBible 4.0
- Developer(s): Laridian, Inc., Servant Software (David Fedor)
- Stable release: 4.100 / August 29, 2006
- Operating system: Palm OS 5 and later
- Type: e-books
- License: Proprietary
- Website: www.laridian.com/palm/default.asp

MyBible (formerly known as Scripture) is a Bible study eBook application for Palm OS.

== History ==
MyBible started off on the Newton as The Message (not related to the Bible version of the same name), produced by Servant Software. This application later made it to the Palm and was named Scripture. Scripture featured the King James Version (which was free), the New International and New American Standard versions (which required a fee), and the Revised Standard Version (which was free but the user was required to mail a form to the Center for Computer Analysis of Texts division of the University of Pennsylvania for copyright reasons). Besides these versions, Scripture had support for bookmarks, footnotes, and a fast search engine.

In 1999, Servant Software licensed Scripture to Laridian, Inc., which renamed the product MyBible. In 2005, Laridian assumed all development, support, and sales.

In May 2003, Laridian released MyBible 3.0. This version added support for Christ's words in red, note taking, and support for then newer devices that used virtual Graffiti and high-resolutions such as 320x320 and 320x480.

On December 30, 2004, Laridian released MyBible 4.0. This new version dropped support for pre-Palm OS 5 devices. Split-screens were added, along with the ability to read reference books. A verse history function was added along with a dictionary lookup feature for Bibles.

August 29, 2006, Laridian released MyBible 4.100 to accommodate the KJV and New American Standard Bible versions that incorporated Strong's numbers. This added a mode to display hyperlinked numbers next to words in the English translations by which someone could look up the original word in the Greek or Hebrew lexicon as a MyBible dictionary.
