= Bible Analyzer =

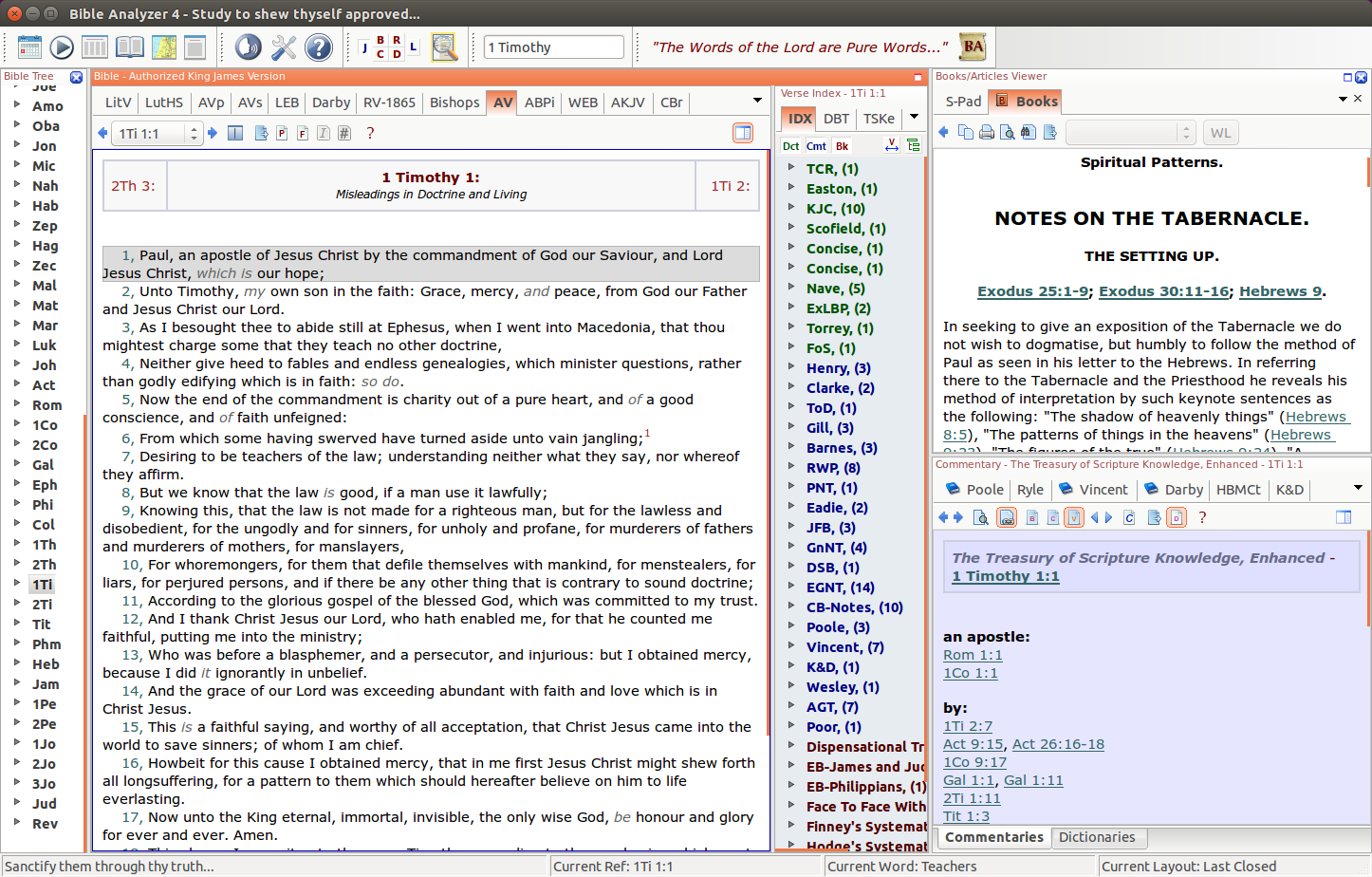
- Screenshot of Bible Analyzer 4.9 Beta on Linux
- Developer(s): Timothy Morton
- Initial release: January 2006
Stable release
- Windows: 5.4.1 / November 14, 2019; 5 years ago
- macOS (10.10-10.15): 5.4.1 / November 15, 2019; 5 years ago
- macOS X (10.6-10.9): 4.9.2 / May 20, 2014; 10 years ago
- Linux: 5.2.1 / May 17, 2018; 6 years ago
- Written in: Python/wxPython
- Operating system: Windows XP or later Macintosh OSX 10.5-10.9 macOS 10.10 -10.15; Linux Mint 18 or later Ubuntu 18.04-19.10
- Available in: English
- Type: Bible Study Tools
- License: Copyrighted Freeware
- Website: www.bibleanalyzer.com

Bible Analyzer is a freeware, cross-platform Bible study computer software application for Microsoft Windows, Macintosh OS X, and Ubuntu Linux. It implements advanced search, comparison, and statistical features of Bible texts as well as more typical Bible software capabilities. It received a high rating for version 4.4 from download.com. The Macintosh edition has also received positive reviews.

== Overview ==
Bible Analyzer is written in Python with a wxPython GUI. According to its author it was first conceived in 2003 to address areas in Bible study and analysis that are largely untouched among other Bible software programs. Primarily features such as Bible text comparison, proximity range searches, and textual statistical analysis. Versions 1.0 through 2.2 concentrated on these features. The version 3 series greatly expanded them and added other features such as a dedicated cross-reference panel, "Related Verse" Searches, Text-To-Speech and Audio features, etc. Version 4.0 includes a major updating of the interface and also a Harmony/Parallel Text Generator, Advanced Related Phrase Search, Multiple Bible Search capabilities, exporting of study data to the "MultiWindow," etc. Version 4.5 introduced the "Session Manager" which allows the user to configure different sessions of modules for various types of studies.

Version 4.7 introduced some original and unique capabilities. Along with the optional Authorized Version People Edition Bible, Bible Analyzer can search for specific individuals using an ID tagging system. Each person in the Bible (as well as all references to deity, including pronouns) is tagged with a unique ID to enable individual searching. For instance, any one (or more) of the six Marys in the Bible can be found at the exclusion of the others. Furthermore, references to deity, such as pronouns, alternate designations, etc., other than by name (God, Jesus, Christ, etc.) can be used as search criteria.

Versions 4.8 and 4.9 introduced among other enhancements a built in Download Manager with which all free and premium modules can be downloaded directly into the program.

== Module format ==
Bible Analyzer utilizes Bible, Commentary, Dictionary, Book and Image modules in the open-source SQLite database format. Users can easily create custom modules with the built in "Module Creator." There are scores of free and premium modules available from the Bible Analyzer website.

Bible Analyzer has in its module format such works as E. W. Bullinger's Companion Bible Notes and Appendices in fully searchable, digital format, the 11 volume Understanding The Bible Commentary by David Sorenson, Books and Charts by Clarence Larkin such as Dispensational Truth, the 23 volume Pulpit Commentary, the 43 volume Expositor's Bible, the 56 volume Biblical Illustrator, and many more.

Bible Analyzer is updated regularly and a CD-Rom with over 1200MB of data is available.

== Reviews ==
- Bible Software Review, Review of Bible Analyzer version 3.5.2
- Download.com, Review
- Baptist Basics
- Bible Software Review, Bible Analyzer For Macintosh

== See also ==
=== Biblical scholarship and analysis ===
- Dating the Bible
- Textual criticism
- Historical criticism
- Documentary hypothesis
- Synoptic Gospels
- Biblical manuscripts
- Internal consistency of the Bible
- Mosaic authorship
- Authorship of the Johannine works
- Authorship of the Pauline epistles
- Non-canonical books referenced in the Bible
- Apocrypha
- Dead Sea Scrolls
- Nag Hammadi library
- Biblical archaeology

=== Perspectives on the Bible ===
- Bibliolatry
- John Calvin's view of Scripture
- Jewish Biblical exegesis
- Islamic view of the Bible
- Biblical narratives and the Quran
- Criticism of the Bible
- Gnosticism and the New Testament
- Good News (Christianity), concerning the content of the Bible's message about Jesus
- Christianity and Judaism
- Biblical law in Christianity
- Bible prophecy
- Biblical inerrancy
- Life of Jesus in the New Testament
- Ten Commandments
- Parashah
- Ritual Decalogue
- Jewish messianism
- Christian eschatology
- Bibliomancy is the use of random readings from a book for divination. When practiced in Jewish and Christian cultures, the Bible is often used.
- Bible conspiracy theory
- Bible code

=== Interpretation ===
- Biblical literalism
- Biblical hermeneutics
- Midrash
- Pardes (Jewish exegesis)

=== History and the Bible ===
- The Bible and history
- Chronology of the Bible
- Hebrew Bible: Timeline
- English translations of the Bible
- Code of Hammurabi
- Study Bible
- List of burial places of biblical figures
- List of artifacts significant to the Bible

=== Biblical topics ===
- Alcohol
- Circumcision
- Crime and punishment
- Ethics
- Homosexuality
- Murder
- Slavery
- Women

=== Bible societies ===
- See Bible society for a list.

=== Commentaries ===
See Biblical exegesis.

=== Religious texts ===
- List of Religious texts
