= Accordance =

- Developers: OakTree Software, Inc.
- Stable release: 13.x (MacOS, Windows) / January 2020
- Operating system: System 7 through current MacOS, Windows, iOS, Android
- Type: Digital library, Bible study
- License: Proprietary
- Website: www.accordancebible.com

Accordance is a Bible study program for Apple Macintosh and iPhone, and now Windows and Android, developed by OakTree Software, Inc.

Although originally written exclusively for the Mac OS (and then iOS), Accordance was then released in a Windows-native version, although it was available prior to this by using the Basilisk II emulator. Since 2018 there has also been an Accordance app for Android.

The program is used for both private and academic study.

== OakTree Software ==
OakTree Software, Inc. is based in Altamonte Springs, Florida, United States. The company has focused on the study of Biblical texts.

== Program history ==
Roy Brown, OakTree Software's president and application developer, created one of the first Bible programs available for the Macintosh, known as ThePerfectWord, in 1988. ThePerfectWord was later bought by another company and renamed MacBible.

By the early 1990s there were a number of general Bible study programs for the Macintosh. However, Brown saw the need for a new program which would make it easy to engage in more sophisticated Bible study, enabling scholars and pastors to perform in-depth analysis of the original Greek and Hebrew texts of the Bible. Accordance 1.0 was released in February 1994.

The translators of the Holman Christian Standard Bible, completed in 2004, used it for word studies, comparisons and instant searches.

A version of Accordance 5.0 rewritten to run natively under Mac OS X was released in 2002. The company has continued to add and improve features, such as adding the native Quartz rendering system. Version 8 was released in May 2008 and introduced a universal binary for Intel-based Macs. Additional versions were released in 2010 through 2016. Version 12 (2016) saw a refreshing of the packages available, where, apart from individual modules, users could purchase collections from a specialized stream (Hebrew, Greek, English or Graphics). Version 13 was released in November 2019 that included a new look, built-in training, and import from PDF.

Accordance for iOS was released on December 30, 2010, as a free app for iPhone, iPod Touch and iPad.

After running through an emulator for many years, in 2013 Accordance released as Windows-native software, with upgrades and updates generally running in parallel with the Mac software.

Accordance for Android was released in 2018.

== Modules available ==
The program is centered on the Biblical text, but has many additional texts. There are optional modules, detailed study tools for the original Hebrew and Greek, commentaries and reference dictionaries, with a cross-reference system to interconnect the Biblical text with libraries of ancient extra-biblical material.

Some modules available include:

- Mishnah, Targums, Pseudepigrapha, Josephus and early Christian writings such as the Didache
- Biblia Hebraica Stuttgartensia with the Groves-Wheeler Westminster Hebrew Morphology
- Louw & Nida Semantic Domain Lexicon
- GNT Robinson Byzantine
- Dead Sea Scrolls
- Bible Atlas and Bible Lands Photo Guide
- Comprehensive Cross Reference interactive module for Dead Sea Scrolls, Josephus, Philo, Nag Hammadi Library, Pseudepigrapha, Old Testament Apocrypha, New Testament Apocrypha, Plato, Pythagoras, Dhammapada, Egyptian Book of the Dead, Tacitus, Talmud, New and Old Testaments, Apostolic and Early Church Fathers

Although the product has many modules, these are packaged into "Collections" (which have replaced all of the earlier "bundles" and "libraries").
