= Theological Markup Language =

The Theological Markup Language (ThML) is a "royalty-free" XML-based format created in 1998 by the Christian Classics Ethereal Library (CCEL) to create electronic theological texts. Other formats such as STEP and Logos Library System (LLS) were found unacceptable by CCEL as they are proprietary, prompting the creation of the new language. The ThML format borrowed elements from a somewhat similar format, the Text Encoding Initiative (TEI).

As of September 19, 2006, CCEL had 650 documents in this format. The advantage of using an XML-based format is that a ThML text can be converted into HTML by using an XSLT stylesheet. Also, standard XML tools can convert to PDF and RTF.

As of November 8, 2012, the last Document Type Definition of the format, version 1.04, was released on January 20, 2003.

== Software ==
- The SWORD Project — Bible study software project that supports most operating systems, portable devices, and web services.

== See also ==
- Go Bible application for Java mobile phones
- Open Scripture Information Standard (OSIS)

== Bibliography ==
- Plantinga, Harry (2003-01-20), ThML: Theological Markup Language version 1.04, Christian Classics Ethereal Library.
