= WORDsearch =

WORDsearch Bible Software, based in Austin, Texas was one of the oldest and largest publishers of software and digital books specifically for Christian pastors, Bible teachers, and students. WORDsearch became part of the ministry of B&H Publishing Group of LifeWay Christian Resources of Nashville, but was sold to competitor Faithlife in 2020. After the announcement of the sale, it was announced that Wordsearch would be retired and transitioned to Logos Bible Software, with users receiving Logos for free. WORDsearch produced specialized study programs under the brands WORDsearch, QuickVerse, and myWSB and a compatible library of over 5,000 digital books on Windows, MacIntosh, iPad, Android, and web browsers. It was developed under the academic division of B&H Publishing.

== Bible Software Products ==
WORDsearch 12 the company's flagship Bible software brand running on Windows and Mac PCs, automates tasks in the process of Bible exegesis and hermeneutics. Key functions of WORDsearch include searching a user's digital library by word, topic, or scripture reference, hyperlinking to related documents, and copying selected materials into a target document. WORDsearch users regard it highly for its speed and ease of use.

WORDsearch is frequently used by pastors for the creation of sermons, and teachers for preparation of cell group and Sunday School lessons. QuickVerse 10, is a discontinued variant of the WORDsearch program that reads the same digital books and features most of the same functions. The functional capabilities of QuickVerse 10 better suit the needs of lay Bible teachers. QuickVerse 10 offers a means for hundreds of thousands of past QuickVerse customers to continue using digital books acquired with older versions of QuickVerse. myWSB.com is a free, web browser-based Bible software program with a different functional approach, but nearly the same library of resources as WORDsearch and QuickVerse. WORDsearch Bible is a free mobile Bible software program available for iOS and Android. It offers a limited set of functions on nearly the same library of resources.

All of the Bible software versions connect to the same set of online ownership records so that a customer is able to acquire a digital book for one of the programs, and use it from any of the other programs, in nearly all cases at no additional charge. LifeWay eBooks can also be used with myWSB.com, as well as the same iOS and Android apps used by WORDsearch. Both LifeWay and WORDsearch customer IDs can be entered in the same programs. Reviewers found that WORDsearch is powerful enough to be useful for preachers. It is one of About.com's top 10 bible programs. A free application called WORDsearch Starter is also available.

== Bible Resources/Content ==
Those who are members of the WORDsearch family of Bible software are able to access a common library of over 5,000 digital books in 24 categories including Bibles, commentaries, dictionaries and encyclopedias, handbooks, word studies and more. The WORDsearch library has a notable concentration in expository preaching, with collections of works from authors including John MacArthur, Stephen Olford, John Phillips, J. Vernon McGee, Charles Spurgeon, John Stott, W. A. Criswell, Adrian Rogers, R. Kent Hughes, Maze Jackson, Robertson Nicoll, Alexander Maclaren, and Haddon Robinson.

A second area of strength in the WORDsearch library is counseling, with collections from authors June Hunt, Neil T. Anderson, James Dobson, Joni Eareckson Tada, Gary Chapman, and many others. Some notable works prized by Bible expositors and available from WORDsearch include The Preacher's Outline and Sermon Bible, the Complete Biblical Library, and the Thompson Chain-Reference Bible.

Resources can be purchased in bundles or individually. Sometimes discounted. Hebrew, Greek and other languages are searchable. The Complete Biblical Library New Testament was favorably received. The original versions of WORDsearch used the STEP (rtf) format. WORDsearch acquired Epiphany Software in 2003 and changed it to Epiphany's CROSS (Christian Reference Open Software Standard) format which supports XML starting with Wordsearch 7.

== History ==
WORDsearch was founded in 1987 by Dr. Jim Sneeringer and Dr. Cheryl Sneeringer; it was one of the earliest commercial examples of digital publishing in any domain. Jim and Cheryl earned PhDs in Computer Science at the University of North Carolina at Chapel Hill supervised by Dr. Fred Brooks, and became evangelical Christians partly through his witness. Their shared interest in Bible study, teaching, and computer software led Jim to create the WORDsearch program while on sabbatical from IBM (ROLM) Corporation.

The program became part of the product line of NavPress Software in Colorado Springs, Colorado in 1989. In 1993, Dr. Jim Sneeringer and Randolph Beck of Austin acquired the assets of NavPress Software and continued to publish with that name. In July 2002, the publishers adopted WORDsearch as the corporate name. In July 2003, WORDsearch acquired the assets of Epiphany Software, Inc. of San Jose including the program and brand Bible Explorer. Andrew Cogan, the former president of Epiphany, joined as chief technical officer of WORDsearch. In April 2004, WORDsearch entered a licensing and publishing partnership with LifeWay Christian Resources to supply the Bible Explorer program, to be published under the brand Bible Navigator, as the exclusive Bible Software program of LifeWay.

In May 2011, WORDsearch agreed to acquire the assets of the QuickVerse® product line from Findex.com. QuickVerse was the largest selling Bible software program during the 1990s. In June 2011, all of the assets of WORDsearch were acquired by LifeWay. On September 18, 2020, it was announced that WORDSearch was sold to Faithlife and then the software would be retired.
