= Go Bible =

Java Bible software

- Original author: Jolon Faichney
- Developer: Jolon Faichney
- Release: September 28, 2003; 23 years ago
- Stable release: 2.4.4 / December 14, 2012; 13 years ago
- Operating system: Java Platform, Micro Edition
- Size: 1.5 MB
- Type: Bible study
- License: New BSD license
- Website: go-bible.org
- Repository: crosswire.org/svn/gobible/

Go Bible is a free Bible viewer application for Java mobile phones (Java ME MIDP 1.0 and MIDP 2.0). It was developed by Jolon Faichney in Surf City, Gold Coast, Queensland, Australia, with help from several other people who assisted in making versions for other languages and translations. Go Bible is installed like any other midlet by copying the .jar and .jad file to the cell phone by USB or Bluetooth. The English KJV Go Bible 1.1 can also be installed using WAP download.

== Features ==
Go Bible 2.2.6 featured:

- Christ’s Words in red
- SMS scriptures
- Bookmarks
- History
- Coloured themes
- Fast search

== Releases ==
Releases subsequent to 2.2.6 are hosted on the SVN server for the CrossWire Bible Society. Compiled versions of Go Bible Creator can be downloaded from the relevant Google groups.

- 2011-03-11 Go Bible 2.4.1 – bug fix in Go Bible Creator in word-wrap for the manifest
- 2010-04-17 Go Bible 2.4.0 – several bug fixes and enhancements; plus removed Send MMS from menu options, and ended support for MIDP 1.0
- 2009-07-10 Go Bible 2.3.5 – added support in Go Bible Creator for USFM tag /r
- 2009-05-11 Go Bible 2.3.4 – more minor bug fixes for Go Bible Creator
- 2009-04-27 Go Bible 2.3.3 – has some bug fixes for Go Bible Creator
- 2008-09-24 Go Bible 2.3.2 – source code checked in, but binary not posted on original site

In July 2008, Go Bible was adopted as a software development project by the CrossWire Bible Society.

- 2008-03-31 Go Bible 2.2.6 – latest version of English KJV Go Bible and twenty two other languages
- 2008-03-26 Go Bible 2.2.5
- 2007-08-09 Go Bible 2.2.4 – improvement to Go Bible Creator
- 2007-04-12 Go Bible 2.2.3
- 2007-02-06 Go Bible 2.2.2
- 2006-07-30 Go Bible 2.2.1
- 2006-03-16 Go Bible 2.2
- 2004-06-28 Go Bible 2.0
- 2003-09-28 Go Bible 1.01

The news page on the Go Bible website provides some more details. For more detailed development history up to March 2005, see the onthenet.com.au website.

== Languages ==
=== Go Bible site ===
Including the King James Version which heads the list, Go Bible is already available in 23 languages. These include:

EnglEnglishish - Afrikaans - Arabic - Chinese - Danish - Dutch - Finnish - French - German - Hungarian - Indonesian - Norwegian - Portuguese - Romani (Gypsy) - Romanian - Russian - Spanish - Swedish - Tagalog (Filipino) - Ukrainian - Vietnamese -

=== Other websites ===
Third-party developers have already published Go Bible translations in the following further languages:

Albanian - Armenian - Basque - Breton (NT) - Burmese - Cebuano - Zo (NT) - Chamorro (portions) - Coptic - Croatian - Czech - Dari - Esperanto - Estonian - Georgian - German (Volxbibel translation) - Greek - Haitian Creole - Hebrew (OT) - Hindi - Hungarian - Icelandic - Indonesian/Bahasa - Japanese - Kabyle - Kekchi - Korean - Latin (Vulgate) - Latvian - Lithuanian - Malayalam - Manx Gaelic (portions) - Maori - Mizo - Nepali - Paite - Pashto - Persian - Polish - Potawatomi (portions) - Serbian - Shuar - Slovak - Slovenian - Swahili - Ukrainian - Uma - Urdu - Tamajaq (portions) - Tamil - Thai - Turkish - Welsh - Wolof - Xhosa -

These lists are likely to grow as more people become involved in using the developer application.

Many of the Go Bible translations still use English for the Bible book names, and for the user interface, though that is now starting to change as developers become more familiar with the features of the developer application.

=== Unicode fonts ===
Go Bible uses the Unicode fonts installed by the mobile phone manufacturer. Some translations may not display correctly on all phones due to missing code pages or individual codes. Also, there are problems with some Sony Ericsson phones with regard to displaying Arabic script and other right-to-left languages. Rendering such languages properly depends on having a correct implementation of the bidirectional algorithm as well as glyph shaping.

== Compatibility ==
=== Phones with limited memory ===
It is possible to divide Go Bible into several smaller collections so that the JAR files can be installed in mobile phones with limited memory. For some models, splitting into Old Testament and New Testament is sufficient. For older models, splitting into files smaller than 1MB, 512KB, 256KB or 128KB may be necessary. Go Bible 1.0 is suitable for phones with 64KB JAR file limit.

=== Phones that check certificates ===
Go Bible applications are not digitally signed. Some phone models by default will not install unsigned applications. In many such cases, it is usually possible to find a phone setting to change to accept unsigned applications.

== Developer application ==
The author has also provided a developer kit called Go Bible Creator. This enables further translations and language versions to be generated by users. Go Bible Creator takes as data input Bible files in Theological Markup Language (ThML) or Open Scripture Information Standard (OSIS). From version 2.3.2, the ability to process Unified Standard Format Markers (USFM) has been added.

Go Bible Creator supports two useful additional features:

- Book name mapping – this enables translated Bible book names to be mapped to English book names.
- Translated user interface – this requires the translation of 73 words or short phrases from the English default UI.

Go Bible Creator was used successfully by the author of the Mobile Bible site in Belgium to create several Go Bible collections in various languages.

Another user has started a Go Bible Box.net account, from which several more Go Bible collections may be downloaded.

The author has started a Go Bible Project on Google Code, but for discussing the Go Bible source code is Go Bible Dev.

Go Bible Creator is not limited to making Bible collections. It can also be used to create other types of e-Book, such as an electronic hymn book (words only) or daily devotionals.

The original source code for both GoBibleCore and GoBibleCreator was available online under the new BSD license. The latest source code is available from CrossWire, under the GNU GPLv2 license.

Go Bible Creator is supported by the SIL Pathway project for publishing scripture.

Go Bible Creator is supported by the open source Bible editing application called Bibledit.

One member of the Theologische Initiative Freiburg has written software scripts to convert Zefania XML Bible modules into the ThML format for use with Go Bible Creator. Though the description is "Converts a Zefania XML bible modul to a SWORD -modul", the download includes a tool for Go Bible. The host language is German.

== Distribution ==
Go Bible is listed in a number of free and open source software distributor sites, such as:

- Softpedia
- GetJar
- HandyByte
- Game-Thing

Go Bible is also being used on a number of Christian websites.

== Go Bible in Java ME emulators ==
The Go Bible application can be previewed in the following Java ME emulators:

- MicroEmulator
- Mpowerplayer

It is also possible to run Go Bible applications on a Pocket PC by installing the following:

- IBM MIDP 2.0 Java Emulator

It is even possible to run Go Bible in a Sony PlayStation Portable by installing a Java emulator for the PSP. See:

- PSPKVM

Go Bible also works in the JVM called Esmertec Jbed, (J2ME Programming/Esmertec Jbed) which can be installed on various mobile phone platforms.

== Similar products ==
- OliveTree Bible Software has a number of Bible Reader applications for various mobile phone and PDA platforms.
- jBible is a Russian website with free Bible reading applications for Java mobile phones. Russian, Belarusian and Ukrainian Bibles are available.
- Sky Bible is an application for mobile phones and hand held devices, used to view Bible text in many languages. Sky Bible is intended for Symbian phones.
- YouVersion Bible application for Java phones.
- GoBible LLC creates a suite of stand-alone personal audio players for purchase.

== See also ==
- The SWORD Project, cross-platform open source Bible software
- Zefania XML Bible Markup Language – German
- List of free and open-source software packages
