= Bibleserver.com =

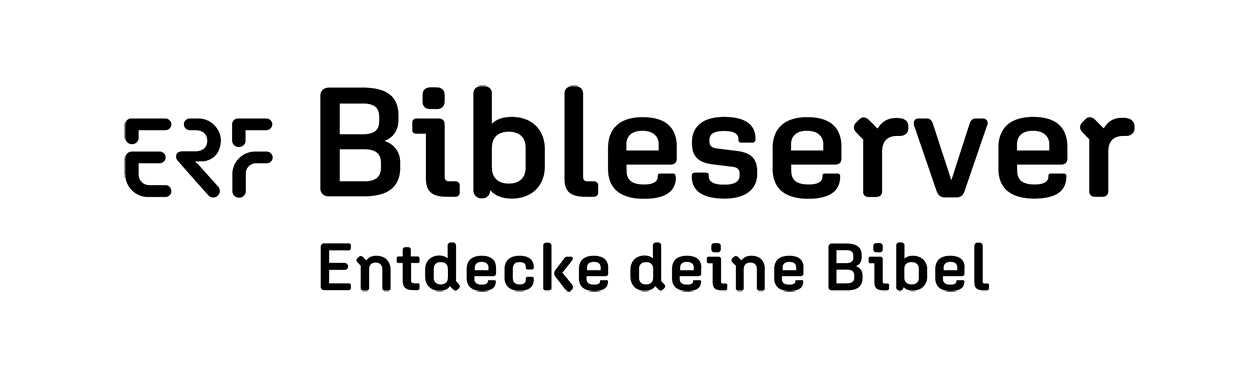
- Website type: Bible
- Available in: 21 languages
- Owner: ERF Online
- Website: www.bibleserver.com
- Commercial: No
- Registration: Optional
- Launched: March 1, 2002; 24 years ago
- Current status: Online

Bibleserver.com is a webpage offered by ERF Online which, through the international cooperation with various Bible Societies and publishers, provides 46 modern and historical Bible translations in 21 languages (as of June 2011). This webpage also offers user interfaces in these 21 languages.

== History ==
ERF Online placed the first version online in March 2002. Originally, it was only available in German at bibelserver.de and provided four translations of the Bible (Luther 1984, Rev. Elberfelder, Hoffnung für alle (Hope for All), Gute Nachricht (Good News Bible).

When the domain moved to www.bibleserver.com in March 2003, this second version of the online Bible covered 23 translations in 15 different languages. At that time, ERF Online cooperated with the International Bible Society (now known as Biblica), the Deutsche Bibelgesellschaft, and the publisher SCM R. Rrockhaus.

In November 2005, the third version with extended functions was launched. The fourth version of Bibleserver.com was relaunched in March 2010 which facilitates the linking of Bible texts via URL and offers a version for mobile devices at m.bibleserver.com.

== Cooperating partners, translations and languages ==
Bibleserver.com offers the most important English Bible translations (for example the English Standard Version, Authorized King James Version and the New International Version) but most of all the current German Bible translations (for example the Luther 1984, Neue Genfer Übersetzung, Rev. Elbefelder). This distinguishes Bibleserver.com from other comparable online Bible services. It further covers a large range of Eastern European languages (for example: Czech and Romanian). The following list shows the Bible translations contained in the current version and the Bible Societies that provided them:

Bible Society	Translation	Language
Crossway	English Standard Version	English
Biblica	Authorized King James Version	English
	New International Version	English
	New International Reader's Version	English
	Hoffnung für alle	German
	Bible du Semeur	French
	Het Boek	Dutch
	La Parola è Vita	Italian
	Nueva Versión Internacional (Castilian)	Spanish
	Nueva Versión Internacional	Spanish
	Bibelen på hverdagsdansk	Danish
	O Livro	Portuguese
	En Levende Bok	Norwegian
	Nya Levande Bibeln	Swedish
	Słowo Życia	Polish
	Slovo na cestu	Czech
	Hrvatski	Croatian
	Hungarian	Hungarian
	Noua traducere în limba românã	Romanian
	Nádej pre kazdého	Slovak
	Новый перевод на русский язык	Russian
	Священное Писание	Russian
	التفسير التطبيقي للكتاب المقدس	Arabic
Deutsche Bibelgesellschaft	Luther 1984	German
	Gute Nachricht Bibel	German
Stiftung Christliche Medien	Rev. Elberfelder	German
	Neues Leben Bibel	German
Geneva Bible Society	Schlachter 2000	German
	Neue Genfer Übersetzung	German
	Segond 21	French
	Nuova Riveduta 2006	Italian
Katholisches Bibelwerk	Einheitsübersetzung	German
ERF Medien Switzerland	Audio Bible (comprising several translations)	German
www.bibliata.com	Българската Библия	Bulgarian
The Bible Society in Turkey	Türkçe (Old Testament)	Turkish
The Translation Trust	Türkçe (New Testament)	Turkish
Česká biblická společnost]	Český ekumenický překlad	Czech
Biblion	Překlad 21. Století	Czech
Sociedad Bíblica Iberoamericana	La Biblia Textual	Spanish
Karl-Heinz Vanheiden	Neue evangelistische Übersetzung	German

Most of the above-mentioned Bible translations are protected by international copyright laws. Portions or complete Bible translations are not to be manually or automatically downloaded or in any way transferred electronically. These Bible translations are available on public domain: Vulgate, the Hebrew Old Testament, Septuagint, IBS-fordítás (Új Károli), Bible Kralická and the Chinese Union Version. Some translations only have the New Testament available. Bibleserver.com provides the Apocrypha in three different translations (Gute Nachricht Bibel, Einheitsübersetzung, Český ekumenický překlad).

== Functions ==
=== Without registration ===
The user interface adapts by default to the language used by the browser. Furthermore, Bibleserver.com automatically chooses a suitable translation for the first steps. The search function recognizes any of the 21 languages, based upon the language chosen for the user interface or Bible translation. Additionally, Bibleserver.com offers a programming interface (API) for webmasters, via the client or server, which automatically recognizes Bible verses within a text and links them to Bibleserver.com. Manual linking is not necessary. Several other tools are offered including:

- extensive search functions
- reference books (for example: Treasury of Scripture Knowledge, Jamieson Fausset Brown Bible Commentary, Scofield Reference Notes)
- comparison of up to five Bible texts
- Strongs Dictionary for the King James Version
- quick share of Bible verses on Facebook and Twitter

=== With registration ===
The registration is free of charge and offers access to further functions. For example: editing tags and notes, an expanded selection of dictionaries and possibilities to set the text formatting.

== Use by other media services ==
The German Wikipedia links biblical citations to Bibleserver.com by default. The guideline for Bible citations, “Vorlage:Bibelzitate“, has already been used in more than 4000 articles.
