= Online Bible =

The Online Bible (OLB) is a Bible Reference software package created in 1987 by Larry Pierce in Canada, who believed the Bible should be freely shared. In 1995 a Windows edition was released as download as well as on cd-rom. The first Mac version was developed by Ken Hamel, and lateron continued from Canada (for OS X 10.1 above), till it was discontinued. However in Europe there was developed a whole new range of Online Bible apps for iOS (2013), Android (2014) and macOS (2015). These apps are available in App Store and Play Store.

== Features ==
- Multiple translations, commentaries, lexicons and dictionaries
- Multilingual - Unicode support for displaying more languages.
- 650,000 cross references that automatically display according to the verse being researched.
- Built–in search feature.
- Basic package runs in Linux Ubuntu using WineHQ.
- PocketPC version is included with the free basic package.
- Apps for Android, iOS and macOS.

== Version history ==
- 1987 Version 1 (DOS)
- 1992 Version 1 (Mac)
- 1995 Version 7 (Windows)
- 2000 Version 1 (Windows renumbering)
- 2005 Version 2 (Windows)
- 2009 Version 3 (Windows and Pocket PC program)
- 2010 Version 4 (Unicode support)
- 2010 Stichting Online Bible Europe Foundation (support of use of the Online Bible worldwide)
- 2013 iOS-app
- 2014 Android-app
- 2015 macOS-app (total new app for Mac)
- 2016 Version 5 (Windows with OlbLite for Mobile Devices)
- 2019 Windows Content Installer (link from apps to Windows)
- 2024 Version 6 (Windows)

== See also ==
- SABDA - Indonesian Online Bible (Windows edition)
- Cross Link Services - European developers of the Online Bible apps
