= Life.Church =

American evangelical megachurch

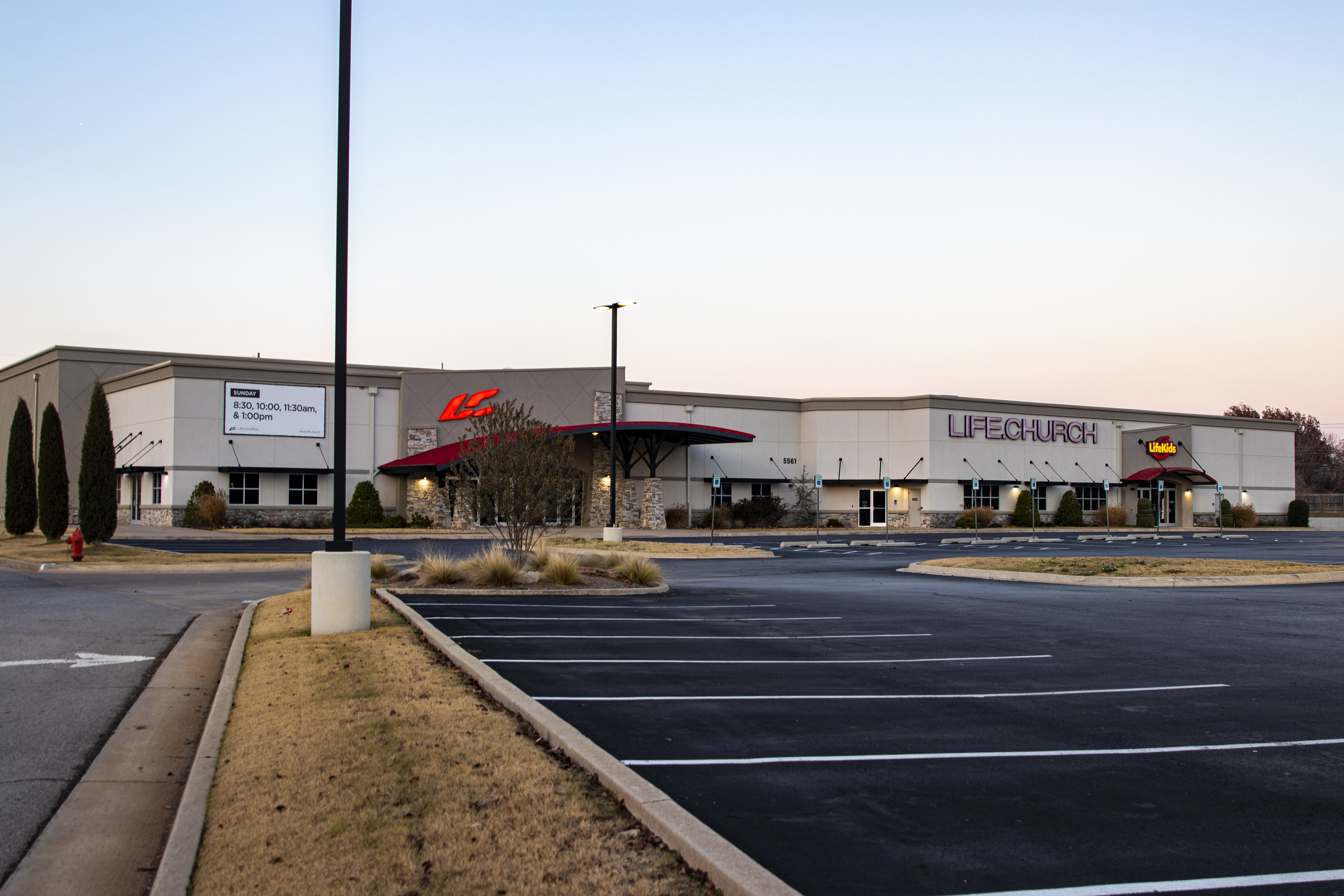
- A Life.Church location in Oklahoma City
- Location: Edmond, Oklahoma based with 46 campuses
- Country: United States
- Denomination: Evangelicalism
- Website: life.church

History
- Status: Active
- Founded: 1996
- Founder: Craig Groeschel

Life.Church (pronounced "Life Church", formerly known as LifeChurch.tv, Life Covenant Church, and Life Church) is an evangelical Christian multi-site megachurch based in Edmond, Oklahoma, United States. It is affiliated with the Evangelical Covenant Church. Craig Groeschel is the founder and senior pastor of Life.Church. Weekly attendance was 85,000 people in 2025 across 46 campuses, making it the largest megachurch in the United States. The church operates YouVersion, a ministry that publishes the Bible App.

== History ==
Life.Church logo

In January 1996, Life.Church was founded as Life Covenant Church in Oklahoma City with 40 congregants meeting together in a two-car garage. The church membership grew rapidly, and Life.Church built its first facility (now known as the "Oklahoma City Campus") in 1999.

In 2001, MetroChurch, a 25-year-old, nondenominational church in nearby Edmond, Oklahoma merged with Life.Church, establishing it as a multi-site church. With this merger, they changed their name to "LifeChurch". Following the multi-site model, the church established campuses in Tulsa and Stillwater, Oklahoma in 2003, with these new campuses using satellite video teaching for services.

States where Life.Church has active churches

Life.Church opened an additional campus in Oklahoma City, the South Oklahoma City Campus, in Spring 2005. In February 2006, Life.Church introduced a campus in Fort Worth, Texas, its first location outside Oklahoma. In April 2006, the church established its "Internet Campus" which broadcasts weekly services live over the internet.

On Easter Sunday, 2007, Life.Church began broadcasting from a campus in the online game Second Life. Life.Church also opened campuses in northwest Oklahoma City in 2007, Wellington, Florida in 2012, and Albany, New York in 2016.

In 2012, the church had more than 26,000 members.

In 2015, the church had 15 campuses in different American states.

In 2018, the church claimed 85,000 members and operated 30 campuses. In 2025, weekly attendance was 85,000 across 46 locations.

== Workplace culture and allegations ==
In April 2026, The Roys Report published an investigation documenting former Life.Church staff allegations of a toxic workplace culture. According to the reporting, employees described being required to divulge extensive personal information during hiring interviews, with sensitive details later being used against them in the workplace. Former staff reported excessive criticism for minor missteps, expected vulnerability in personal matters, and described experiencing anxiety, gaslighting, and physical illness related to work environment stress. Approximately 400 former employees have connected through a private support group to share their experiences.

In June 2026, former graphic designer Leeann Holmberg sued Life.Church for disability discrimination, alleging violations of the Americans with Disabilities Act (ADA), Family and Medical Leave Act (FMLA), and Age Employment Discrimination Act (ADEA).

== Beliefs ==
The Church has an evangelical confession of faith and is a member of the Evangelical Covenant Church.

== See also ==
- List of the largest evangelical churches
- List of the largest evangelical church auditoriums
