= Palm Bible Plus =

Bible software for Palm OS

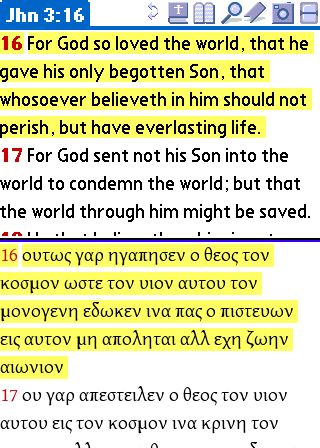
- On the top half of the screen, John 3:16 in the King James Version is shown; the same verse is also shown in the Textus Receptus (Greek) at the bottom. John 3:16 is highlighted in yellow because it is bookmarked
- Developer(s): Yih-Chun Hu (formerly Poetry Poon)
- Stable release: 3.2 (November 28, 2005; 19 years ago) [±]
- Operating system: Palm OS
- Type: e-books
- License: GNU GPL
- Website: https://palmbibleplus.sourceforge.net/

Palm Bible Plus is an open source document viewing program for Palm OS-based PDAs, focused on displaying the Bible and commentaries about the Bible. It allows the user to read Bibles stored in RAM or on a memory card via VFS. It is licensed under the GNU GPL.

This program is a fork of Bible Reader for Palm, a project started in August 2001 by Poetry Poon as an open source project licensed under the GNU GPL. After Poon decided to go closed source to ease support for copyrighted Bible versions, Yih-Chun Hu started work on earlier open source version.

Besides reading the Bible and being able to navigate to specific locations, Bible Reader can search the Bible using three different search systems (phrase, set of terms, or boolean search query) and immediately jump to related verses using its cross-reference system (by tapping on the verse number). It includes a bookmark system; bookmarks can be assigned to categories, and each category can highlight verses with different colors. Text notes can be added and associated with verses or bookmarks. Two different documents can be displayed simultaneously in parallel windows, which are then kept in sync (these documents can be different translations or commentaries). It can also perform dictionary lookup on double tap of a word, using the Plucker Plugin Interface (PPI) to other programs. Other features include built-in support for Hebrew and Greek fonts, "snapshots" to store search and navigation settings, auto-scrolling, support for display "skins" and plug-ins and text rotation.

A vast number of Bible translations and commentaries are available for Palm Bible Plus. English translations available include the traditional King James Version (KJV) and the modern well-respected translation the English Standard Version (ESV). Many other versions in many other languages, including the original Greek, Hebrew, and Aramaic text, are available. The program allows two views to be seen at once, allowing someone to view two different translations, a translation and the original, or some text and a commentary at the same time.

Although regarded as great Bible reader comparable to the best desktop competitors, reviewers noted some weak points: slow searching, no support for copyrighted Bible versions, lack of advanced export/import functions or limited colour customization of text and background. Ability to run on broad range of Palm devices also leads to more complex installation process.

Palm Bible Plus Bible files in PDB format can be read in Symbian OS platform using Symbianbible application (free software/open source). The PDB file reader engine for Symbianbible was ported from Palm Bible Plus.
