= Logos Bible Software =

Digital library software

Logos Bible Study Platform

- Logos Bible Software 6 running on Windows
- Developer: Faithlife Corporation, although Logos is marketed under its own brandname
- Release: 1992; 34 years ago
- Written in: C#, C++
- Operating system: Windows; macOS; iOS; iPadOS; Android
- Type: E-Books; Digital Library; Bible Study
- License: Freemium / Subscription (Premium, Pro, Max, and Plus tiers), with perpetual licenses available for purchased content. Transition to subscription occurred in October 2024.
- Website: www.logos.com

Logos (formerly Logos Bible Software) is a digital Bible study platform developed by Faithlife Corporation. It is designed for electronic Bible study and theological research. In addition to basic ebook functionality, it includes extensive resource linking, note-taking, linguistic analysis tools for study of the Bible in both translation and original languages, and—as of 2024—AI-powered features including natural-language search, passage summarization, and a Bible Study Builder.

Faithlife, LLC
- Formerly: Logos Research Systems, Inc.
- Type: Private
- Industry: Computer software
- Founded: 1992; 34 years ago
- Founder: Bob Pritchett; Dale Pritchett; Kiernon Reiniger
- Headquarters: Bellingham, Washington, United States
- Key people: (CEO, September 2025–present) Chris Migura
- Products: Logos for Education (B2B offering for higher education) Logos for Church (B2B offering for churches); Verbum (Catholic edition of Logos); Proclaim (church presentation software); Biblia.com (free online Bible)
- Number of employees: Approximately 350 (2025) per multiple sources.
- Website: faithlife.com/about

Faithlife Corporation publishes and produces the Logos Bible Software, but also publishes tools and resources under a number of other brands, and partners with more than 500 publishers to offer over 120,000 Christian ebooks available to users of its software.

== History ==
Founded in 1992 as Logos Research Systems, Inc., when two Microsoft employees, Bob Pritchett and Kiernon Reiniger, along with Bob’s father, Dale Pritchett quit their jobs to develop Christian software. Their first product was called Logos Bible Software for Microsoft Windows. For nearly 20 years this was the company's only major product, but more recently they have diversified into a number of other products and services. In October 2014, to reflect this change, the company was rebranded as Faithlife Corporation. In October 2022, the company announced they are refining their strategic direction, exiting church management functionality and other parts of Faithlife Equip, and instead focus on Bible study tools, content delivery, and digital discipleship. The current CEO of Faithlife is Chris Migura. Faithlife is a portfolio company of Cove Hill Partners.

=== Windows and Macintosh versions ===
Logos Bible Software was launched in 1992 by two Microsoft employees, Bob Pritchett and Kiernon Reiniger, along with Bob's father, Dale Pritchett. The three quit their jobs to develop Christian software. After acquiring data from the CDWordLibrary project at Dallas Theological Seminary (an earlier Bible software package for use on Windows 2), Logos released an updated version called the Logos Library System platform in 1995.

Logos Bible Software for Windows, v1.6

=== Mobile versions ===
An iPhone app was released alongside Logos 4 in November 2009.

An Android app was released in 2012. The initial release allowed little more than the reading of Logos books, so version 2.0 followed quickly in August 2012, which added notes, highlighting, reading plans, Bible Word Study, the Passage Guide and a split-screen view. This brought much closer parity with the iOS app.

=== Rebranded versions ===
Faithlife Corporation has also produced rebranded versions of Logos Bible Software with almost identical functionality. Verbum Catholic Software is aimed at Roman Catholics (and adds databases of Catholic topics and Saints, and more data from the Deuterocanonical Books). From 2014 to 2020, Faithlife produced Noet, which focused on scholarly work in the humanities, particularly the classics and philosophy.

Faithlife also publishes a Year-End Song and Sermon Report which ranks the most popular christian songs and sermons of the year.

=== Corporate Leadership Changes ===
Faithlife sold a majority stake to private equity firm Cove Hill Partners in 2020. In January 2022, co-founder Bob Pritchett stepped down as CEO, transitioning to Executive Chairman. Vik Rajagopal (formerly Faithlife CFO, previously a decade at Amazon) became CEO. In 2022, Faithlife exited the church management software market (Faithlife Equip), refocusing the company on Bible study tools, content, and digital discipleship. Under Rajagopal, the company began re-emphasizing the Logos brand over Faithlife externally, effectively repositioning as a Bible study platform company. Rajagopal was succeeded as CEO by Bill McCarthy (February 2024), who was then succeeded by Chris Migura (September 24, 2025). McCarthy moved to Board Chair. Bob Pritchett subsequently founded AllDrafts, a legal tech company.

=== 2024 Subscription model transition ===
In October 2024, Logos launched a major update, transitioning from a traditional perpetual-license model to a subscription-based platform with three tiers: Logos Premium (aimed at personal study and small group leaders), Logos Pro (for sermon preparation), and Logos Max (for academic and original-language study). Updates to the subscription version are released approximately every six weeks. Previously purchased libraries and content remain accessible without a subscription, and subscribers who maintain 24 consecutive months of a subscription earn a legacy fallback license for non-cloud features. The 2024 release also introduced several AI-powered tools (see below).

== Reception ==
It has been noted for being user-friendly, having the largest number of resources for software of its type, and offering unique tools and datasets not found in other products. It has also received some criticism for its high cost and lack of speed when compared with other Bible software packages.

== AI Integration ==
Beginning with the 2024 subscription release, Logos incorporated several artificial intelligence tools into the platform. These include:

• Smart Search—A natural-language search tool that allows users to query their library using plain-language questions rather than Logos-specific search syntax. Results include an AI-generated synopsis footnoted with sources from the user's library.

• AI Summarize—Generates summaries of books, articles, and passages. Available in early access as of 2024.

• Bible Study Builder—An AI-assisted tool for constructing Bible study guides and discussion questions from a given Scripture passage.

• Sermon Builder—Adds AI-suggested discussion questions, illustrations, and sermon outlines to the existing Sermon Builder tool, but it will not write a full sermon.

• In-app Help Center—An AI-powered contextual help system.

Faithlife has stated that the majority of its AI tools draw exclusively from the user's Logos library rather than the open internet, and that AI-generated content is labeled as such within the interface."

== Publishing and imprints ==
Logos operates several publishing imprints and digital media outlets designed to complement its software ecosystem. These brands focus on biblical scholarship, original research, and instructional content for both laypeople and clergy.

=== Word by Word ===
Originally launched in 2004 as the Logos blog, Word by Word is the official blog and digital publication of Logos. It is currently led by managing editor Kirk E. Miller. It serves as a primary hub for articles on biblical studies, theology, practical ministry, and Bible study and features contributions from notable scholars, authors, and ministry leaders.

=== What in the Word? ===
Launched as both a video series and a podcast, What in the Word? is hosted by Kirk E. Miller. The program features interviews with theologians and biblical scholars to provide expert guidance on interpreting difficult or "strange" passages of Scripture. The show is distributed across platforms including YouTube, Spotify, and Apple Podcasts, emphasizing the application of scholarship to challenging biblical texts.

=== Logos Live ===
Logos Live is a cross-denominational interview program produced by Logos. The show features a rotating group of hosts from the Logos team, including Kirk E. Miller, who interview prominent authors, pastors, and church leaders. The program has a broad purpose of helping viewers deepen their understanding of Scripture.

=== Lexham Press ===
Lexham Press was the in-house publishing imprint of Faithlife, LLC that specialized in books that draw from the Christian tradition and the global church to provide resources for pastors, scholars, parents, and students of the Bible. On September 23, 2025, Baker Publishing Group bought Lexham Press.
