= Bible translations =

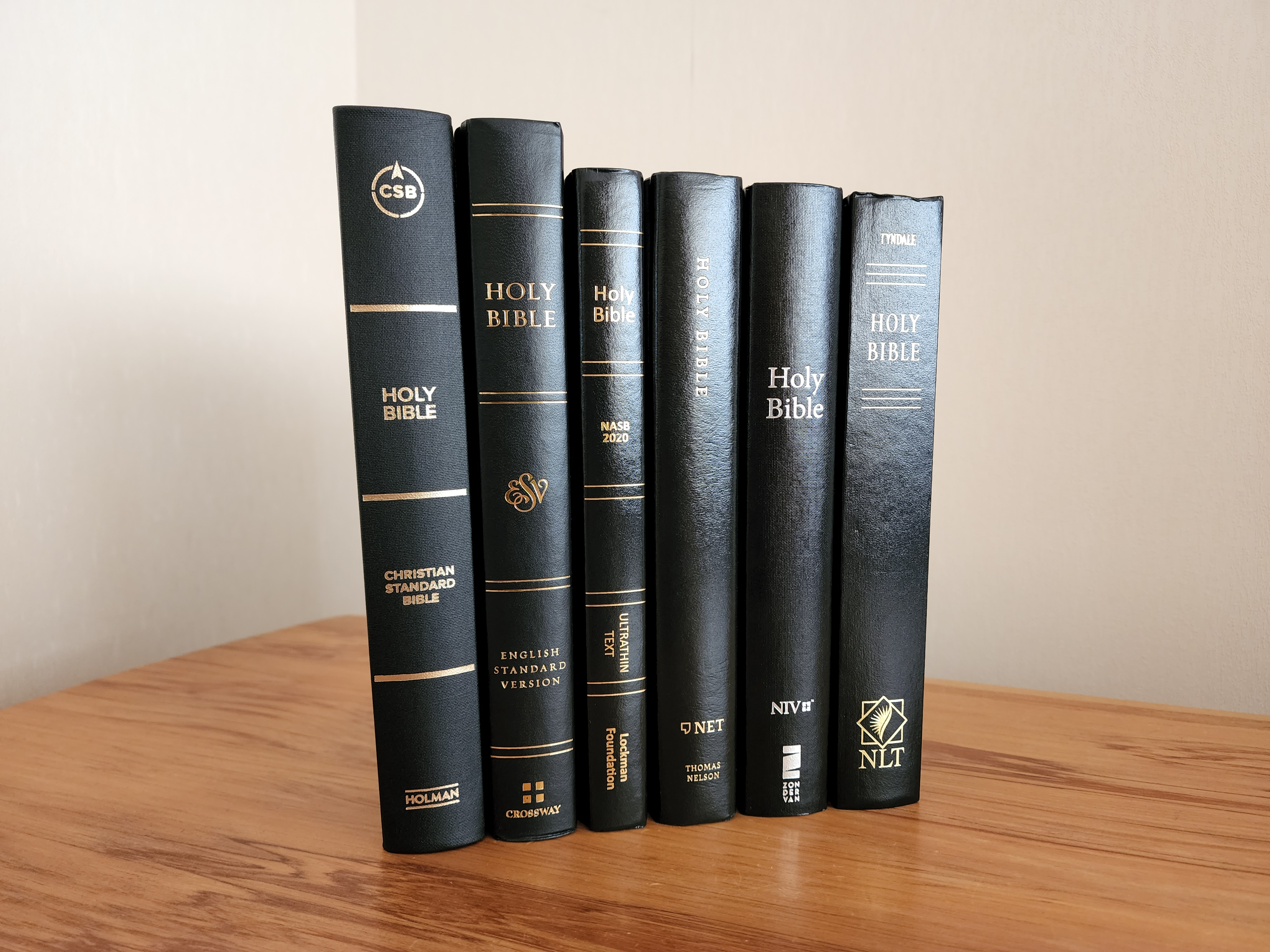
A selection of Bible translations in contemporary English

The Christian Bible has been translated into many languages from the biblical languages of Hebrew, Aramaic, and Greek.

According to Wycliffe Bible Translators, as of September 2026 the full Protestant Bible has been translated into 807 languages, the New Testament has been translated into an additional 1,844 languages, and smaller portions have been translated into 1,519 other languages. Thus, at least some portions of the Bible have been translated into 4,170 languages, out of a total of 7,394 known languages (including sign languages).

Textual variants in the New Testament include errors, omissions, additions, changes, and alternate translations. In some cases, different translations have been used as evidence for or have been motivated by doctrinal differences.

== Original text ==
=== Hebrew Bible ===
The Hebrew Bible was mainly written in Biblical Hebrew, with some portions (notably in Daniel and Ezra) in Biblical Aramaic. Some of the Deuterocanonical books not accepted in every denomination's canons, such as 2 Maccabees, originated in Koine Greek.

In the third and second centuries BC, the Hebrew scriptures were translated into Koine Greek, known as the Septuagint version. This was the version commonly used by the writers of the Gospels.

From the 6th century to the 10th century AD, Jewish scholars, today known as Masoretes, compared the text of various biblical manuscripts in an effort to create a unified, standardized text. A series of highly similar texts eventually emerged, and any of these texts are known as Masoretic Texts (MT). The Masoretes also added vowel points (called niqqud) to the text, since the original text contained only consonants. This sometimes required the selection of an interpretation; since some words differ only in their vowels their meaning can vary in accordance with the vowels chosen. In antiquity, variant Hebrew readings existed, some of which have survived in the Samaritan Pentateuch and other ancient fragments, as well as being attested in ancient versions in other languages.

=== New Testament ===
The New Testament was written in Koine Greek reporting speech originally in Aramaic, Greek and Latin (see Language of the New Testament).

The autographs, the Greek manuscripts written by the original authors or collators, have not survived. Scholars surmise the original Greek text from the manuscripts that do survive.

Most variants among the manuscripts are minor, such as alternative spelling, alternative word order, the presence or absence of an optional definite article ("the"), and so on. Occasionally, a major variant happens when a portion of a text was missing or for other reasons. Examples of major variants are the endings of Mark, the Pericope Adulteræ, the Comma Johanneum, and the Western version of Acts.

Early manuscripts of the Pauline epistles and other New Testament writings show no punctuation whatsoever. The punctuation was added later by other editors, according to their own understanding of the text.

Four main textual traditions of the Greek New Testament have been theorized to allow grouping and analysis of manuscripts and changes: the Alexandrian text-type, the Byzantine text-type, the Western text-type and perhaps a largely lost Caesarean text-type, however many manuscripts are mixes of these.

The discovery of older manuscripts which belong to the Alexandrian text-type, including the 4th-century Codex Vaticanus and Codex Sinaiticus, led scholars to revise their view about the original Greek text. Karl Lachmann based his critical edition of 1831 on manuscripts dating from the 4th century and earlier, to argue that the Textus Receptus must be corrected according to these earlier texts.

There is also a long-standing tradition owing to Papias of Hierapolis (c.125) that the Gospel of Matthew was originally in Hebrew. Scholars have proposed various explanations : one theory is that Matthew himself produced a Semitic work and secondly a Greek recension; Josephus also claimed to write a translation of an Aramaic version of The Jewish War, though both the extant Gospel of Matthew and the War are not translations. Another is that others translated Matthew into Greek rather freely. Another is that Papias meant a Hebrew style of Greek. Eusebius (c.300) reports that Pantaenus went to India (c. 200) and found them using a Gospel of St Matthew in Hebrew letters. Jerome also reports in his preface to St Matthew that it was originally composed "in Hebrew letters in Judea" not in Greek and that he saw and copied one from the Nazarene sect.

== History ==
Collection of Bibles and New Testaments in several languages

=== Ancient translations ===
==== Aramaic Targums ====
Some of the first translations of the Torah began during the Babylonian exile, when Aramaic became the lingua franca of the Jews. With most people speaking only Aramaic and not understanding Hebrew, the Targums were created to allow the common person to understand the Torah as it was read in ancient synagogues.

==== Greek Septuagint ====
By the 3rd century BC, Alexandria had become the center of Hellenistic Judaism, and during the 3rd to 2nd centuries BC translators compiled in Egypt a Koine Greek version of the Hebrew scriptures in several stages (completing the task by 132 BC). The Talmud ascribes the translation effort to Ptolemy II Philadelphus (r. 285–246 BC), who allegedly hired 72 Jewish scholars for the purpose, for which reason the translation is commonly known as the Septuagint (from the Latin septuaginta, "seventy"), a name which it gained in "the time of Augustine of Hippo" (354–430 AD). The Septuagint (LXX), the very first translation of the Hebrew Bible into Greek, later became the accepted text of the Old Testament in the Christian church and the basis of its canon. Jerome based his Latin Vulgate translation on the Hebrew for those books of the Bible preserved in the Jewish canon (as reflected in the Masoretic Text), and on the Greek text for the deuterocanonical books.

The translation now known as the Septuagint was widely used by Greek-speaking Jews, and later by Christians. It differs somewhat from the later standardized Hebrew (Masoretic Text). This translation was promoted by way of a legend (primarily recorded as the Letter of Aristeas) that seventy (or in some sources, seventy-two) separate translators all produced identical texts; supposedly proving its accuracy.

Versions of the Septuagint contain several passages and whole books not included in the Masoretic Text of the Tanakh. In some cases these additions were originally composed in Greek, while in other cases they are translations of Hebrew books or of Hebrew variants not present in the Masoretic Text. Recent discoveries have shown that more of the Septuagint additions have a Hebrew origin than previously thought. While there are no complete surviving manuscripts of the Hebrew texts on which the Septuagint was based, many scholars believe that they represent a different textual tradition ("Vorlage") from the one that became the basis for the Masoretic Text.

=== Late Antiquity ===
The books collected as the Christian New Testament were written in Koine Greek. (Note: Some scholars hypothesize that certain books (whether completely or partially) may have been written in Aramaic before being translated for widespread dissemination. One very famous example of this is the opening to the Gospel of John, which some scholars argue to be a Greek translation of an Aramaic hymn.) In the view of many scholars, the Gospels may have collected oral apostolic tradition rather than being simply dictated.

The proto-canonical books of the Old Testament were available in two sources: Hebrew and the Greek Septuagint translation. Since Jerome, Christian translations of the Old Testament (except the Psalms) tend to be derived from the Hebrew texts, though some denominations prefer the Greek texts (or may cite variant readings from both). Modern Bible translations incorporating modern textual criticism usually begin with the Masoretic Text, but also take into account possible variants from all available ancient versions.

==== 2nd century ====
Origen's Hexapla (c. 235) placed side by side six versions of the Old Testament: the Hebrew consonantal text, the Hebrew text transliterated into Greek letters (the Secunda), the Greek translations of Aquila of Sinope and Symmachus the Ebionite, one recension of the Septuagint, and the Greek translation of Theodotion. In addition, he included three anonymous translations of the Psalms (the Quinta, Sexta and Septima). His eclectic recension of the Septuagint had a significant influence on the Old Testament text in several important manuscripts.

In the 2nd century, the Old Testament was translated into Syriac translation, and the Gospels in the Diatessaron gospel harmony. The New Testament was translated in the 5th century, now known as the Peshitta.

In the 2nd and 3rd centuries, the New Testament was translated into various Coptic (Egyptian) dialects. The Old Testament was already translated by that stage.

==== 3rd century ====
The Frankfurt silver inscription, dated to between 230 and 270, quotes Philippians 2:10-11 in a Latin translation. It is the earliest reliable evidence of Christianity north of the Alps.

==== 4th century ====
In 331, the Emperor Constantine commissioned Eusebius to deliver fifty Bibles for the Church of Constantinople. Athanasius (Apol. Const. 4) recorded Alexandrian scribes around 340 preparing Bibles for Constans. Little else is known, though there is plenty of speculation. For example, it is speculated that this may have provided motivation for canon lists, and that Codex Vaticanus Graecus 1209, Codex Sinaiticus and Codex Alexandrinus are examples of these Bibles. Together with the Peshitta, these are the earliest extant Christian Bibles.

The Bible was translated into Gothic (an early East Germanic language) in the 4th century by a group of scholars, possibly under the supervision of Ulfilas (Wulfila).

Canon (i.e. Item) 59 of the Synod of Laodicea in 363 specified that uncanonical books should not be read in church. Canon 60, whose authenticity is disputed, then supplied a canon similar to that given by Bishop Cyril of Jerusalem's catechesis in 350: both lacked the Book of Revelation. The canon of Athanasius of Alexandria in 367 added Revelation in his thirty-ninth Festal Letter. All three included the so-called deuterocanonical books of Baruch and Lamentations.

Jerome's Vulgate Latin translation dates to between AD 382 and 405. Latin translations predating Jerome are collectively known as Vetus Latina texts. Jerome began by revising these earlier Latin translations, but ended by going back to the original Greek, bypassing all translations, and going back to the original Hebrew wherever he could instead of the Septuagint.

There are also several ancient translations, most important of which are in the Syriac dialect of Aramaic (including the Peshitta).

==== 4th to 6th century ====
The Codex Vaticanus dates to c. 325–350, and is missing only 21 sentences or paragraphs in various New Testament books: it is one of the four great uncial codices. The earliest surviving complete single-volume manuscript of the entire Bible in Latin is the Codex Amiatinus, a Latin Vulgate edition produced in 8th-century England at the double monastery of Wearmouth-Jarrow. Latin and its early Romance dialects were widely spoken as the primary or secondary language throughout Western Europe, including Britain even in the 700s and 800s.

Between the 4th to 6th centuries, the Bible was translated into Ge'ez (Ethiopic).

In the 5th century, Mesrob Mashtots translated the Bible using the Armenian alphabet invented by him. Also dating from the same period is the first Georgian translation. The creation of the Georgian scripts, like the Armenian alphabet, was also attributed to Mashtots by the scholar Koryun in the 5th century. This claim has been disputed by modern Georgian scholars, although the creation of a Georgian alphabet was likely still motivated by Christians who wished to translate holy scriptures.

In the 6th century, the Bible was translated into Old Nubian.

By the end of the eighth century, Church of the East monasteries (so-called Nestorians) had translated the New Testament and Psalms (at least, the portions needed for liturgical use) from Syriac to Sogdian, the lingua franca in Central Asia of the Silk Road, which was an Eastern Iranian language with Chinese loanwords, written in letters and logograms derived from Aramaic script. They may have also translated parts of books into a Chinese.

=== Middle Ages ===
Before the advent of the printing press and mass literacy, medieval vernacular translation of scriptural texts was mainly and necessarily mediated, and oral, memorized, extemporized or versified. The Western Catholic church utilized Latin as a pan-European lingua franca for liturgical, and scholarly use. Local efforts sporadically provided vernacular translations in major national languages, however personal study of the Bible does not necessarily occupy the same urgent role in lay Catholic life and devotion as it does in e.g. sola scriptura-style Protestantism: "the Christian faith is not a 'religion of the book.'"

==== Early Middle Ages ====
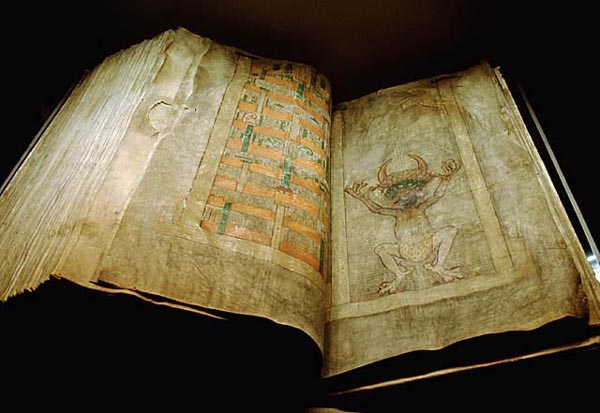
The Codex Gigas from the 13th century, held at the Royal Library in Sweden

When ancient scribes copied earlier books, they wrote notes on the margins of the page (marginal glosses) to correct their text—especially if a scribe accidentally omitted a word or line—and to comment about the text. When later scribes were copying the copy, they were sometimes uncertain if a note was intended to be included as part of the text. See textual criticism. Over time, different regions evolved different versions, each with its own assemblage of omissions, additions, and variants (mostly in orthography).

There are some fragmentary Old English Bible translations, notably a lost translation of the Gospel of John into Old English by the Venerable Bede, which is said to have been prepared shortly before his death around the year 735. An Old High German version of the Gospel of Matthew dates to 748. Charlemagne in c. 800 charged Alcuin with a revision of the Latin Vulgate. The translation into Old Church Slavonic was started in 863 by Cyril and Methodius.

Alfred the Great, a ruler in England, had a number of passages of the Bible circulated in the vernacular in around 900. These included passages from the Ten Commandments and the Pentateuch, which he prefixed to a code of laws he promulgated around this time. In approximately 990, a full and freestanding version of the four Gospels in idiomatic Old English appeared, in the West Saxon dialect; these are called the Wessex Gospels. Around the same time, a compilation now called the Old English Hexateuch appeared with the first six (or, in one version, seven) books of the Old Testament.

==== High Middle Ages ====
The arrival of the mendicant preaching orders in the 12th century saw individual books being translated with commentary, in Italian dialects.

Typically the Psalms were among the first books to be translated, being prayers: for example, the earliest Polish translation from 1280.

There are numerous manuscripts of the Psalms in Catalan from the 13th, 14th and 15th centuries, translated from the Vulgate, Occitan, French and Hebrew, with a New Testament and full Bible translation made in the 1300s. Parts of an Old Testament in Old Spanish from the late 1300s still exist.

Monks completed a translation into Franco-Provençal (Arpitan) c.1170-85, commissioned by Peter Waldo. The complete Bible was translated into Old French in the late 13th century. Parts of this translation were included in editions of the popular Bible historiale, and there is no evidence of this translation's being suppressed by the Church. In England, "about the middle of the fourteenth century—before 1361—the Anglo-Normans possessed an independent and probably complete translation of the whole of the Old Testament and the greater part of the New."

Friar Giovanni da Montecorvino of the large Franciscan mission to Mongol China in the early 1300s translated the Psalms and New Testament into the language of the Tartars: the Uyghur language or perhaps the Mongolian language.

A royal Swedish version of 1316 has been lost. The entire Bible was translated into Czech around 1360.

The provincial synods of Toulouse (1229) and Tarragona (1234) temporarily outlawed possession of some vernacular renderings, in reaction to the Cathar and Waldensian heresies, in South France and Catalonia. This demonstrates that such translations existed: there is evidence of some vernacular translations being permitted while others were being scrutinized.

==== Late Middle Ages ====
A group of Middle English Bible translations were created: including the Wycliffean Bibles (1383, 1393) and the Paues' New Testament, based on the Vulgate. New translation efforts were regulated in England by the provincial Oxford Synod in 1408 under church law to require the approval of a bishop; possession of material that contained Lollard material (such as the so-called General Prologue found in a few Wycliffite Bibles) was also illegal by English state law, in response to Lollard uprisings.

Later, many parts of the Bible in Late Middle English were printed by William Caxton in his translation of the Golden Legend (1483), and in the loose paraphrase Speculum Vitae Christi (The Mirror of the Blessed Life of Jesus Christ), which had been authorized into English around 1410.

A Cornish version may have been made.

The Hungarian Hussite Bible appeared in 1416.

Individual books continued to be translated: for example the Gospel of John in Slovak (1469). The first 12 books of the Old Testament in Danish (also used for Norwegian) was made in c. 1480.

The invention of printing saw complete Catholic Bibles produced in German (1466 and after; multiple), Valencian Catalan (1478), Tuscan (1471), Venetian (1471) and Dutch (1477).

From the late 1300s, the Brethren of the Common Life encouraged their laypeople to read the Gospels they would hear at church at home beforehand, in the vernacular. The early public demand for printed Dutch vernacular scriptures seems to have been for translations of the daily or weekly liturgical readings, and most printed books were of this Gospels and Epistles type; from the 1520s this reverted to a demand for pandect (full) Bibles. (Note: "On the basis of the analysis of hundreds of manuscripts containing Middle Dutch Bible translations we concluded in earlier studies that medieval people could read the complete Bible, but did not want to: they preferred to read liturgical lessons. [...] We may conclude, then, that readers in the late fifteenth and early sixteenth centuries preferred to read the Bible according to the liturgical reading schedule, and that is the reason they were printed that way from 1477 on.")

=== Reformation and Early Modern period ===
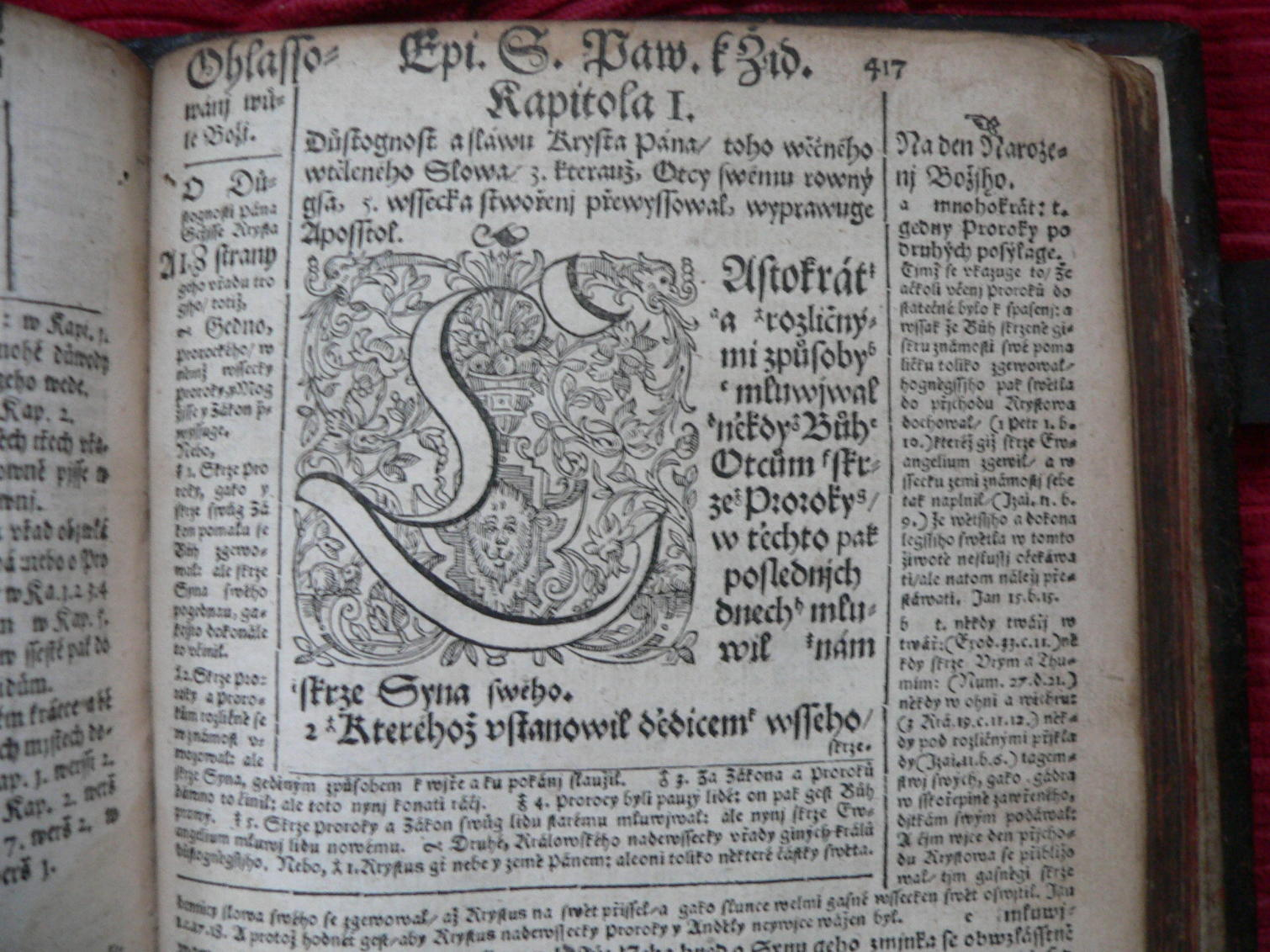
Czech Protestant Bible of Kralice (1593)

In the early 1500s there were several independent scholarly Catholic efforts to produce polyglot editions of the bible or updated Latin translations: these included the Complutensian Polyglot sponsored by Castilian Archbishop Ximénez at his new University of Alcalá de Henares, Augustinian canon Erasmus' Novum Instrumentum omne (New Testament only) sponsored mainly by English bishops, and Italian Dominican friar Santes Pagnino's Veteris et Novi Testamenti nova translatio eventually sponsored by the Pope.

The earliest printed edition of the Greek New Testament appeared in 1516 from the Froben press, by Desiderius Erasmus, who reconstructed a Greek text from several recent manuscripts of the Byzantine text-type, to accompany his Latin revision and philological annotations. This led to a gradual shift by subsequent translators away from Latin sources to Greek or Hebrew sources, though initially his Latin renditions and annotations were more influential. Erasmus produced four revised editions.

During 1517 and 1519 Catholic layman Francysk Skaryna printed a translation of the Bible in Old Belarusian language in twenty-two books.

In 1521, fiery former friar Martin Luther was placed under the Ban of the Empire, and he hid in the Wartburg Castle. During his time there, he quickly translated the New Testament into German, using the 2nd edition of Erasmus' New Testament, which provide a new Latin translation, detailed annotations on Greek words, and a Greek text for reference. It was printed in September 1522. It was a freer but more idiomatic translation than the numerous other German translations in print, which were often intended as aids to following the Latin Vulgate and so more literal but less idiomatic.

The first complete Dutch Bible, partly based on the existing portions of Luther's translation, was printed in Antwerp in 1526 by Jacob van Liesvelt. Early Protestant translations into Germanic languages, such as the Dutch, Swedish, Danish/Norwegian, Icelandic, Swiss German, Middle Low German and to some extent the English, were based in Luther's Early New High German translation with Erasmus' Latin annotations rather than all from the Greek directly.

The first printed edition with critical apparatus (noting variant readings among the manuscripts) was produced by the printer Robert Estienne of Paris in 1550. The Greek text of this edition and of those of Erasmus became known as the Textus Receptus (Latin for "received text"), a name given to it in the Elzevier edition of 1633, which termed it as the text nunc ab omnibus receptum ("now received by all").

The use of numbered chapters and verses was not introduced until the Middle Ages and later. The system used in English was developed by Stephanus (Robert Estienne of Paris). (See Chapters and verses of the Bible.)

The churches of the Protestant Reformation translated the Greek of the Textus Receptus to produce vernacular Bibles, such as the German Luther Bible (1522), the Polish Brest Bible (1563), the Spanish "Biblia del Oso" (in English: Bible of the Bear, 1569) which later became the Reina-Valera Bible upon its first revision in 1602, the Czech Melantrich Bible (1549) and Bible of Kralice (1579–1593) and numerous English translations of the Bible.

Tyndale's New Testament translation (1526, revised in 1534, 1535 and 1536) and his translation of the Pentateuch (1530, 1534) and the Book of Jonah were met with heavy sanctions given the widespread belief that Tyndale changed the Bible as he attempted to translate it. Tyndale's unfinished work, cut short by his execution, was supplemented by Myles Coverdale and published under a pseudonym to create the Matthew Bible, the first complete English translation of the Bible. Attempts at an "authoritative" English Bible for the Church of England would include the Great Bible of 1538 (also relying on Coverdale's work), the Bishops' Bible of 1568, and the Authorized Version (the King James Version) of 1611, the last of which would become a standard for English speaking Christians for several centuries.

The first complete French Bible printed was a translation by Jacques Lefèvre d'Étaples, published in 1530 in Antwerp. The Froschauer Bible of 1531 and the Luther Bible of 1534 (both appearing in portions throughout the 1520s) were an important part of the Reformation.

By 1578 both Old and New Testaments were translated to Slovene by the Protestant writer and theologian Jurij Dalmatin. The work was not printed until 1583. The Slovenes thus became the 12th nation in the world with a complete Bible in their language. The translation of the New Testament was based on the work by Dalmatin's mentor, the Protestant Primož Trubar, who published the translation of the Gospel of Matthew already in 1555 and the entire Testament by parts until 1577.

Following the distribution of a Welsh New Testament and Prayer Book to every parish Church in Wales in 1567, translated by William Salesbury, Welsh became the 13th language into which the whole Bible had been translated in 1588, through a translation by William Morgan then vicar of Llanrhaeadr-ym-Mochnant (later Bishop of Llandaf and St Asaph.

In 1613, Jesuits in Kyoto published a lectionary of the Sunday Gospel readings and other Gospel material in Japanese; this is now lost.

Samuel Bogusław Chyliński (1631–1668) translated and published the first Bible translation into Lithuanian.

In 1660, John Eliot published the Eliot Indian Bible in the language of the Massachusett people, an indigenous American group who lived in the area around what is today Boston, Massachusetts. This was the first translation of the Bible into an indigenous American language. This translation was produced by Eliot in an effort to convert the dwindling population of Massachusett to Christianity in praying towns such as Natick, Massachusetts.

In 1671, a complete Bible translation into Arabic was made in Rome. In 1671, the annual Gospel readings were translated by a Jesuit into Konkani, an Indian language.

By the early 1800's, the full Bible was available into 50 different languages. By 1880, this had doubled to 100 languages, and by 1950 the full text of the Bible was available in 200 languages.

== Modern translation efforts ==
Bible Translation Statistics (for selected years)
Year	Full Bible	New Testament	Portions	Total
1880	101	84	169	354
1900	129	105	276	510
1950	199	240	634	1073
1985	305	662	1128	2095
1990	342	763	1144	2249
1995	376	902	1133	2411
2000	426	1035	1139	2600
2005	477	1166	1092	2402
2010	547	1211	897	2565
2015	634	1333	1045	2932
2016	636	1442	1145	3223
2017	670	1521	1121	3312
2018	683	1534	1133	3350
2019	698	1548	1138	3384
2020	704	1551	1160	3415
2021	717	1582	1196	3495
2022	724	1617	1248	3589
2023	736	1658	1264	3658
2024	756	1726	1274	3756
2025	784	1813	1481	4078
September 2026	807	1844	1519	4170

The Bible is the most translated book in the world, with more than half of the world's languages having at least some portion of the biblical text in their language, and around 99% of people being able to access the biblical text in a language they understand.

The United Bible Societies announced that as of 31 December 2007 the complete Bible was available in 438 languages, 123 of which included the deuterocanonical material as well as the Tanakh and New Testament. Either the Tanakh or the New Testament was available in an additional 1,168 languages, in some kind of translations, like the interlinear morpheme-by-morpheme translation (e.g. some Parallel Bible, with interlinear morphemic glossing).

In 1999, Wycliffe Bible Translators announced Vision 2025 — a project that intends to commence Bible translation in every remaining language community by 2025. It was realised that, at the rates of Bible translation at that point, it would take until at least 2150 until Bible translation began in every language that was needing a translation. The year before Vision 2025 was launched, translation work had resulted in the 400th language having the Bible. Thus, about 300 languages had gained the full Bible in a little over a century, but still represented only about 5% of languages having the Bible available.

Since the launch of Vision 2025, Bible translation efforts have increased dramatically, in large part due to the technology that is now available. By 2019, there had been a sustained reduction in the time it took to begin a new translation, and it was estimated that a new translation will begin in every language by 2038, thus being 112 years faster. A new translation was beginning every 120 hours (5 days), and by 2025 it was estimated a new translation work was beginning every 14 hours.

As of September 2023, they estimated that around 99.8 million people spoke those 1,268 languages where translation work still needs to begin. This represents 17.1% of all languages (based off an estimate of 7,394 total languages) and 1.3% of the human population (based on a global population of 7.42 billion). By April 2025, this had fallen to 801 languages and further reduced to 550 by October 2025 which represented about 38.9 million people. Again, this was reduced to 540 languages by May 2026, and 37.6 million people - representing 0.48% of the world's population, and 7.3% of the world's languages.

In total, it was estimated in 2024 that there are 3,736 languages without any Bible translation at all, but an estimated 1,148 of these (with a population of 9.6 million people) are likely to never need a Bible because they are very similar to other languages, or spoken by very few speakers where the language will likely die out very soon. In October 2025, this had reduced to 3,333 languages without any scripture.

Bible translation is currently happening in approximately 4,447 languages in 167 countries. In November 2024, it was estimated that this work impacts 1.15 billion people, or about 15.5 percent of all language users, who have (or will soon have) new access to at least some portions of Scripture in their first language. In April 2025, this had risen to 1.78 billion individuals (21% of the global population).

Approximately 81% of the world's population have the Bible in their first language, 11.96% of the world have the New Testament, 6.03% have portions of Scripture, and 1.37% have no scripture yet. Most of those without scripture (approximately 9.89 million people) will be considered for a bible translation in the future, however 0.13% of the world's population speaks a language that has such low vitality that it likely will never receive a Bible translation.

An emerging development in area of Bible Translations is the use of AI tools and large language models. According to Wycliffe Global Alliance, AI to translate the Bible has its advantages and risks, with Dr. Taeho Jang of Global Bible Translators stating that humans should retain final authority over high level decisions involving exegesis and theological nuance, though AI has a place in creating translation drafts.

== Differences in Bible translations ==
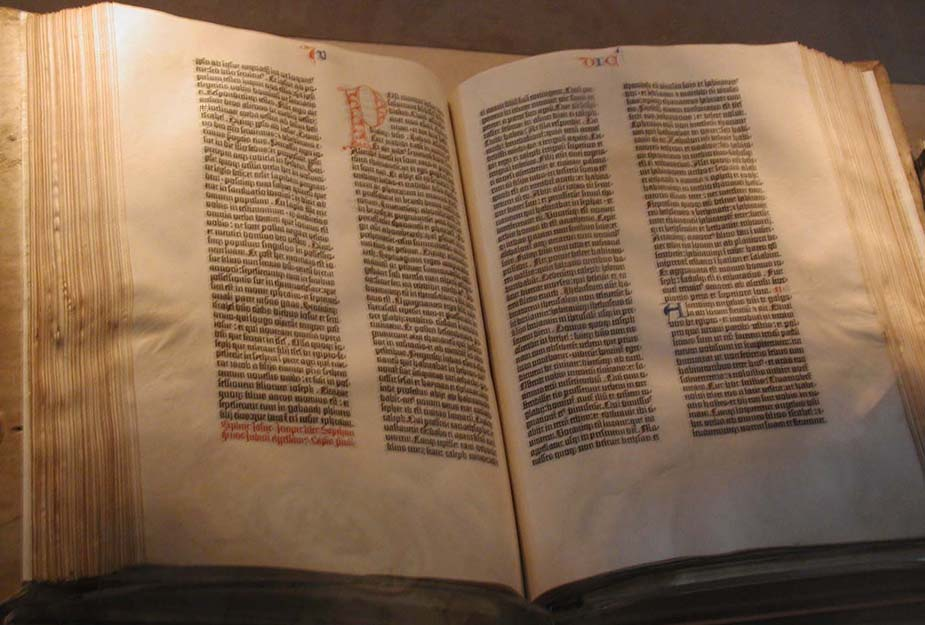
This Gutenberg Bible is displayed by the United States Library of Congress

Modern critical editions incorporate ongoing scholarly research, including discoveries of Greek papyrus fragments from near Alexandria, Egypt, that date in some cases within a few decades of the original New Testament writings. Today, most critical editions of the Greek New Testament, such as UBS5 and NA28, consider the Alexandrian text-type corrected by papyri, to be the Greek text that is closest to the original autographs. Their apparatus includes the result of votes among scholars, ranging from certain {A} to doubtful {E}, on which variants best preserve the original Greek text of the New Testament.

Critical editions that rely primarily on the Alexandrian text-type inform nearly all modern translations (and revisions of older translations). For reasons of tradition, however, some translators prefer to use the Textus Receptus for the Greek text, or use the Majority Text which is similar to it but is a critical edition that relies on earlier manuscripts of the Byzantine text-type. Among these, some argue that the Byzantine tradition contains scribal additions, but these later interpolations preserve the orthodox interpretations of the biblical text—as part of the ongoing Christian experience—and in this sense are authoritative. Distrust of the textual basis of modern translations has contributed to the King-James-Only Movement.

=== Dynamic or formal translation policy ===
A variety of linguistic, philological and ideological approaches to translation have been used. Inside the Bible-translation community, these are commonly categorized as:

- Dynamic equivalence translation
- Formal equivalence translation (similar to literal translation)
- Idiomatic, or paraphrastic translation, as used by the late Kenneth N. Taylor

though modern linguists, such as Bible scholar Dr. Joel Hoffman, disagree with this classification.

Other translation approaches include:

- Literary translation, where the reader's experience of the piece as literature is prized, as used in the Knox Bible
- Metrical translation, where prose is rendered in a rhythmic form, as represented by Old English and Middle English texts
- Prose translation, where no attempt is made to render the lyrical aspect of some poem or song, as King Alfred's prose translation of the first fifty Psalms.

As Hebrew and Greek, the original languages of the Bible, like all languages, have some idioms and concepts not easily translated, there is in some cases an ongoing critical tension about whether it is better to give a word-for-word translation, to give a translation that gives a parallel idiom in the target language, or to invent a neologism.

For instance, in the Douay Rheims Bible, Revised Standard Version Catholic Edition, New American Bible Revised Edition, which are the English language Catholic translations, as well as Protestant translations like the King James Bible, the Darby Bible, the Recovery Version, the Literal Standard Version, the New Revised Standard Version, the Modern Literal Version, and the New American Standard Bible are seen as more literal translations (or "word-for-word").

Translations like the New International Version and New Living Translation sometimes attempt to give relevant parallel idioms. The Living Bible and The Message are two paraphrases of the Bible that try to convey the original meaning in contemporary language.

Less literal translations reflect the translator's theological, linguistic or cultural interpretations; the result is more easily consumed by lay readers. This contrasts with more literal translations where interpretation is left to the reader; lay readers may be unfamiliar with ancient idioms and other historical and cultural contexts.

=== Doctrinal differences and translation policy ===
In addition to linguistic concerns, theological issues also drive Bible translations. Some translations of the Bible, produced by single churches or groups of churches, may be seen as subject to a point of view by the translation committee.

Historian David Lawton notes that in the Middle Ages in the West, even up to the late period, there was "little or no sense that the Bible, even if seen as single or whole, should necessarily stand alone and self-sufficient. It [was] a period without fundamentalists in the modern sense." The Bible was translated (usually from the Vulgate) in accordance with Catholic Sacred Tradition.

However, in modern times, the Second Vatican Council commended approved ecumenical cooperation on biblical translation, so that versions could be available which "all Christians" could use.

==== Name of God ====
Renderings of the name of God relate to doctrinal positions. For example, the New World Translation, published by Jehovah's Witnesses, provides a different rendering, namely "Jehovah", rather than "Lord" when the Bible quotes Hebrew passages that use the Tetragrammaton. Its translation committee believes that Jesus used God's name in some verses and not kurios, theos or theon. On this basis, the anonymous New World Bible Translation Committee translated the name Jehovah in the New World Translation of the Christian Greek Scriptures (New Testament) a total of 237 times while the New World Translation of the Hebrew Scriptures (Old Testament) uses Jehovah a total of 6,979 times, for a grand total of 7,216 in the entire 2013 Revision New World Translation of the Holy Scriptures, while previous revisions such as the 1984 revision has a total of 7,210 times and the 1961 revision was a total of 7,199 times.

A number of Sacred Name Bibles (e.g., the Sacred Scriptures Bethel Edition) have been published that are even more rigorous in transliterating the tetragrammaton using Semitic forms to translate it in the Old Testament–usually Yahweh, Elohim or some other variation–and also using God as the translation of the Greek word Theos in the New Testament.

==== Other differences ====
Other translations are distinguished by smaller but distinctive doctrinal differences. For example, the Purified Translation of the Bible, by translation and explanatory footnotes, promotes the position that Christians should not drink alcohol, with New Testament references to "wine" translated as "grape juice".

== See also ==
Ancient and classical translations

- Early translations of the New Testament
- Targum and Peshitta (Aramaic)
- Greek versions of the Bible
- Vetus Latina and Vulgate (Latin versions)
- Syriac versions of the Bible
- Coptic versions of the Bible

English translations

- Bible translations into English
- Old English Bible translations
- Middle English Bible translations
  - Wycliffite Bible
- Early Modern English Bible translations
  - Tyndale Bible
- Modern English Bible translations
- List of English Bible translations

Other languages

- Bible translations by language

Difficulties

- Gender in Bible translation
- Translation § Fidelity and transparency

Others

- Bible version debate
- Byzantine text-type
- Bible concordance
- Exegesis
- Hermeneutics
- Institute for Bible Translation
- List of languages by year of first Bible translation
- Skopos theory
- Textus Receptus
- Textual variants in the New Testament
- Translation
- Bible names in their native languages
