= Biblical names in their native languages =

Biblical names of God and their meaning

This table is a list of names in the Bible in their native languages.

Biblical names in their native languages
English name	Type of proper noun	Start year (approximate)	End year (approximate)	Native language name
Andrew of Bethsaida (Son of Jonah & Joanna); An apostle of Jesus	Person	AD 5	AD 65	Andrew; Koine Greek: Ἀνδρέας; Pronunciation: Awn-dray-yiss Andrew of Bethsaida; Greek: Ανδρέας της Βηθσαΐδας; Pronunciation: Awn-dray-yiss teese Veeth-sie-doss
Babylonia	Nation	1894 BC	539 BC	Akkadian: 𒆳𒆍𒀭𒊏𒆠; Pronunciation: Māt Akkadī; Meaning: The Country of Akkad
Belshazzar (Son of Nabonidus) (King of Babylonia)	Person	585 BC	539 BC	Babylonian cuneiform: Pronunciation: Bēl-šar-uṣur; Meaning: Bel, protect the king
Bethlehem (Beth Lehem) (This is the biblical birthplace of Jesus Christ. However some scholars believe he was born in Nazareth. See the main article for more information.)	Village	1400 BC		Village name during the kingdoms of Israel, Judah until the Siege of Jerusalem (930 BC to 587 BC): Paleo-Hebrew: 𐤁𐤉𐤕·𐤋𐤇𐤌; Pronunciation: Bayawt Lawkhawm; Meaning: House of Bread Village name from 587 BC through the time of Christ: Aramaic: בית לחם; Pronunciation: Beit Lekhem; Meaning: House of Bread
Beth Shemesh	Village			Paleo-Hebrew: 𐤁𐤉𐤕𐤔𐤌𐤔; Pronunciation: Bayawt Shamawsh; Meaning: House of Sun
Caesar, Augustus (son of Gaius Octavius & Atia)	Person	63 BC	AD 14	Latin: AVGVSTVS CAESAR (Augustus Caesar); Pronunciation: Ow-goos-toos Kie-sar
Canaan	Nation			Phoenician: 𐤊𐤍𐤏𐤍; KNʿN Paleo-Hebrew: 𐤊𐤍𐤏𐤍; Pronunciation: K-naw-un
Caiaphas, Joseph ben	Person	14 BC	AD 46	Hebrew: יהוסף בר קַיָפָא; Pronunciation: Yeh-hoo-siff bar Kie-yuh-fuh
David (Son of Jesse & Nitzevet bat Adael)	Person	1035 BC	970 BC	Paleo-Hebrew: 𐤃𐤅𐤃; Pronunciation: Dauad; Meaning: Beloved One
David, House of (the linage of David)		1035 BC	970 BC	Paleo-Hebrew: 𐤁𐤉𐤕𐤃𐤅𐤃; Pronunciation: Bayawt Dauad
Egypt, Nation of	Nation	3150 BC	30 BC	Ancient Egyptian: km m t O49; Pronunciation: Kemet; Meaning: Black Land
Egypt, Province of (Province of the Roman Republic from 30 to 27 BC, Province of the Roman Empire from 27 BC - AD 641)	Province	30 BC	AD 641	Egypt: Ancient Egyptian: km m t O49; Pronunciation: Kemet; Meaning: Black Land
Ezekiel (son of Buzi)	Person	622 BC	570 BC	Paleo-Hebrew: 𐤉𐤇𐤆𐤒𐤀𐤋; Pronunciation: Yekh-khez-kell; Meaning: Strength of God
Hammurabi	Person	1810 BC	1750 BC	Akkadian: 𒄩𒄠𒈬𒊏𒁉; Pronunciation: Ḫâmmurapi
Isaiah (son of Amoz)	Person	770 BC	715 BC	Paleo-Hebrew: 𐤉𐤔𐤏𐤉𐤄𐤅; Yasha-yahoo; Meaning: Yahweh is Salvation
Israel, Kingdom of See: Kingdom of Israel between 1047 and 930 BC See: Kingdom of Israel between 930 and 720 BC (a.k.a. Kingdom of Samaria) (after the loss of the southern part due to the formation of the Kingdom of Judah)	Nation	1047 BC	720 BC	Paleo-Hebrew: 𐤉𐤔𐤓𐤀𐤋; Pronunciation: Yawsharaall
Jacob of Nazareth (a.k.a. James) (brother of Jesus) (son of Mary & Joseph)	Person	AD 1	AD 66	Jacob: Aramaic: יעקוב; Transliteration: Yaw-aw-kove Jacob of Nazareth: Aramaic: יעקוב נצריא; Pronunciation: Yaw-aw-kove Nawsh-rie-ya
Jericho	Village	After 2348 BC (according to creation dating) 9000 BC (according to mainstream science)	1400 BC	Ugaritic: 𐎊𐎗𐎃; Pronunciation: Yar-ree-kho
Jerusalem	City	3000 BC		Paleo-Hebrew: 𐤉𐤓𐤅𐤔𐤋𐤉𐤌; Transliteration: Yerushalayim
Jesus of Nazareth Son of God and Mary Earthly Father: Joseph	Person	4 BC	AD 30	Jesus: Aramaic: ישוע; Aramaic with vowels: יֵשׁוּע; Transliteration: Yeshu; Meaning: Yahweh is Salvation Jesus of Nazareth; Aramaic: ישוע נצריא; Aramaic with vowels: יֵשׁוּע נָצרָיָא; Transliteration: Yeshu Nawsh-rie-ya Jesus Christ / Jesus the Messiah; Aramaic: ישוע משיחא; Aramaic with vowels: יֵשׁוּע משִׁיחָא; Transliteration: Yeshu Mesheekhaw
Joshua (son of Nun)	Person	1355 BC	1245 BC	Paleo-Hebrew: 𐤉𐤄𐤅𐤔𐤅𐤏; Pronunciation: Yaw-oo-shaw-oo-eh; Meaning: Yahweh is Salvation
Judah, Kingdom of (named after Judah, the son of Jacob and Leah)	Nation	930 BC	586 BC	Judah: Paleo-Hebrew: 𐤉𐤄𐤅𐤃𐤄; Pronunciation: Yuh-how-wuh-duh
Judah Maccabee (son of Mattathias ben Johanan)	Person	190 BC	160 BC	Judah: Hebrew: יהודה; Pronunciation: Yehudaw Judah Maccabee: Hebrew: יהודה המכבי; Pronunciation: Yehudaw Haw-maw-kub-bee
Jude, Province of (province within Babylonia, former Kingdom of Judah)	Province	586 BC	539 BC	Jude: Aramaic: יהוד; Pronunciation: Yehud
Jude, Province of (province within Achaemenid Empire, former Kingdom of Judah)	Province	539 BC	332 BC	Jude: Aramaic: יהוד; Pronunciation: Yehud
Jude, Province of (province within Coele-Syria, former Kingdom of Judah)	Province	332 BC	64 BC	Jude: Aramaic: יהוד; Pronunciation: Yehud
Jude, Province of (province within Hasmonean dynasty, former Kingdom of Judah)	Province	64 BC	37 BC	Jude: Aramaic: יהוד; Pronunciation: Yehud
Jude, Province of (province within Herodian Kingdom, former Kingdom of Judah)	Province	37 BC	6 BC	Jude: Aramaic: יהוד; Pronunciation: Yehud
Jude, Province of (province within the Roman Empire, former Kingdom of Judah)	Province	6 BC	AD 135	Jude: Aramaic: יהוד; Pronunciation: Yehud
Jude of Galilee (apostle of Jesus)	Person	AD 1	AD 65	Jude: Aramaic: יהוד; Pronunciation: Yehud
Jude of Kerioth (a.k.a. Judas) (an apostle of Jesus who later betrayed him)	Person	3 BC	AD 33	Jude: Aramaic: יהוד; Pronunciation: Yehud
Lucifer (Lucifer means the planet Venus, and is not another name for Satan. See main article for more information. It's used in Isaiah 14:12 a metaphor to refer to King Nebuchadnezzar II.)	Planet	4004 BC (according to creation dating) 4,500,000,000 BC (according to mainstream science)		Akkadian: Ishtar (Ishtar is the actual name that King Nebuchadnezzar II would have known the Planet Venus by) (See here for various Akkadian script spellings of Ishtar)
Luke (Luke the Evangelist)	Person	AD 1	AD 84	Aramaic: לוקא; Pronunciation: Luka
Mary of Nazareth (daughter of Joachim & Anne) (Mother of Jesus)	Person	25 BC	AD 75	Aramaic: מרים; Pronunciation: Maryam Aramaic: מרים נצריא; Transliteration: Maryam Nawsh-rie-ya
Mary of Magdala (friend of Jesus)	Person	AD 3	AD 63	Aramaic: מרים; Pronunciation: Maryám
Moses (son of Amram & Jochebed)	Person	1391 BC	1271 BC	Ancient Egyptian: ms s Xrd; Pronunciation: Mo-seh; Meaning: Is Born
Nazareth (This is the village that Jesus grew up in. Although Bethlehem is the biblical birthplace of Jesus, some scholars believe that Jesus was born in Nazareth.)	Village	2200 BC		Aramaic: נצרת; Pronunciation: Naw-saw-reth
Nebuchadnezzar II (son of Nabopolassar) (King of Babylonia)	Person	642 BC	562 BC	Akkadian: Pronunciation: Nabû-kudurri-uṣur; Meaning: Nabu protect my boundary/heir
Nefertari Meritmut (wife of Pharaoh Ramesses II)	Person	1301 BC	1255 BC	Ancient Egyptian: nfr i t r y Pronunciation: Nefertari Ancient Egyptian: t G15 nfr i t r Z1 Z1 n N36 t Pronunciation: Nefertari Meritmut
Paul of Tarsus	Person	AD 5	AD 65	Paul: Greek: Παύλος; Pronunciation: Pávlos Paul of Tarsus: Greek: Ο Παύλος του Ταρσού; Pronunciation: O Pávlos tou Tarsoú
Pilate, Pontius (Pontius Pilate was the governor of the Roman province of Judaea. He gave the order to crucify Jesus.)	Person	20 BC	AD 36	Latin: PONTIVS PILATVS (Pontius Pilatus); Pronunciation: Pone-tee-oos Pee-law-toos
Quirinius, Publius Sulpicius Publius Quirinius was governor of the Roman province of Syria. He created the Roman province of Judaea, and conducted the Census of Quirinius in AD 6. The census was the reason that Joseph and Mary came to Bethlehem, Judaea for Jesus's birth. This contradicts Jesus being born during the time of King Herod I who died in 4 BC.	Person	51 BC	AD 21	Latin: PVBLIVS SVLPICIVS QVIRINIVS (Publius Sulpicius Quirinius); Pronunciation: Poob-blee-oos Sul-pee-kee-oos Kweer-reen-nee-oos
Ramesses I (son of Seti) Pharaoh of Egypt	Person	1345 BC	1294 BC	Ancient Egyptian: ra ms sw Pronunciation: Ra-mes-su
Ramesses II (son of Menmaatre Seti I & Tuya) Pharaoh of Egypt	Person	1303 BC	1213 BC	Ancient Egyptian: ra ms sw Pronunciation: Ra-mes-su
Roman Empire See: The Roman Empire between 27 BC and AD 395 See: The western part of the Roman Empire between AD 395 and 476 See: The eastern part of the Roman Empire between AD 395 and 476 See: The Roman Empire between AD 476 and 1453 (after the loss of the western part)	Nation	27 BC	AD 1453	Roman Empire: Latin: IMPERIVM ROMANVM (Imperium Romanum); Pronunciation: Eem-pair-ee-oom Ro-muh-noom Rome (short name): Latin: ROMA (Roma); Pronunciation: Roma
Roman Kingdom	Nation	753 BC	509 BC	Roman Kingdom: Latin: REGNVM ROMANVM (Regnum Romanum); Pronunciation: Rayg-noom Ro-muh-noom Rome (short name): Latin: ROMA (Roma); Pronunciation: Roma
Roman Republic	Nation	509 BC	27 BC	Roman Republic: Latin: RES PVBLICA ROMANA (Res Publica Romana); Pronunciation: Res poob-lee-ka Ro-muh-na Rome (short name): Latin: ROMA (Roma); Pronunciation: Roma
Samson (son of Manoah)	Person	1154 BC	1124 BC	Paleo-Hebrew: 𐤔𐤌𐤔𐤅𐤍; Pronunciation: Shaw-ma-shie-yun
Samuel (Son of Elkanah & Hannah)	Person	1070	1012	Paleo-Hebrew: 𐤔𐤌𐤅𐤀𐤋; Shaw-maw-yaw-ul
Seti (father of Pharaoh Ramesses I)	Person			Ancient Egyptian: stX i i Pronunciation: Sethi}}
Simon of Cana Apostle of Jesus	Person		AD 65	Simon: Aramaic: שמעון; Pronunciation: Sheem-own
Simon Ben Jonah a.k.a. Peter Apostle of Jesus	Person	AD 1	AD 66	Simon: Aramaic: שמעון; Pronunciation: Sheem-own Simon Ben Jonah: Aramaic: שמעון בר יונה; Pronunciation: Sheem-own Ball Yonaw Peter: Aramaic: כיפא; Aramaic with vowels: כֵּיפָא; Pronunciation: Keifa; Meaning: Rock/Stone
Sinai Peninsula	Region			Ancient Egyptian: b i N41 bH xAst; Pronunciation: Biau; Meaning: The Mining Country Ancient Egyptian: xt x t tyw D12 m f kA D12 niwt Pronunciation: Khetiu Mafkat}} Meaning: The Ladders of Turquoise
Sinim (biblical name of Qin, a state of Zhou)	State	897 BC	207 BC	Old Chinese (Bronze inscriptions): (Baxter–Sagart): /*[dz]i[n]/ (Zhengzhang): /*zin/
Solomon (son of David and Bathsheba)	Person	990 BC	931 BC	Paleo-Hebrew: 𐤔𐤋𐤌𐤄; Pronunciation: Shalawmah; Meaning: Peace
Sumer	Nation	After 2348 BC (according to creation dating) 5500 BC (according to mainstream science)	1800 BC	Akkadian: 𒋗𒈨𒊒; Pronunciation: Shoo-mer-roo
Timothy of Ephesus		AD 30	AD 97	Greek: Τιμόθεος; Pronunciation: Tee-moe-thay-ose
Ur (of the Chaldees)	City	After 2348 BC (according to creation dating) 3800 BC (according to mainstream science)	After 500 BC	Akkadian: 𒋀𒀕𒆠; Pronunciation: urim₂ki /Urim/, “Ur”}}

== See also ==
- Al-Sarkha (Bakhah), Jubb'adin, and Maaloula - the three remaining Syrian villages that still speak Western Aramaic
- Aramaic alphabet
- Babylonian Exile
- Bible translations
- Ketef Hinnom scrolls, the oldest surviving scrolls of the bible
- List of biblical names
- List of cuneiform signs
- List of Egyptian hieroglyphs
- Peshitta, a Syriac translation of the bible
- Proto-Canaanite alphabet
- Pharaohs in the Bible
- Second Temple period
