= Joel Hoffman =

Joel Hoffman may refer to:

- Joel Hoffman (composer) (born 1953), Canadian classical music composer and pianist
- Joel Hoffman (tennis) (born 1958), American tennis player
- Joel Manuel Hoffman (born 1968), American scholar, writer, speaker, and novelist
