= Bible translations into Slovak =

The first known translations of parts of the Bible into Slovak dates to 15th century, although full translations, as an alternative to Bible translations into Czech, date from the year 1756.

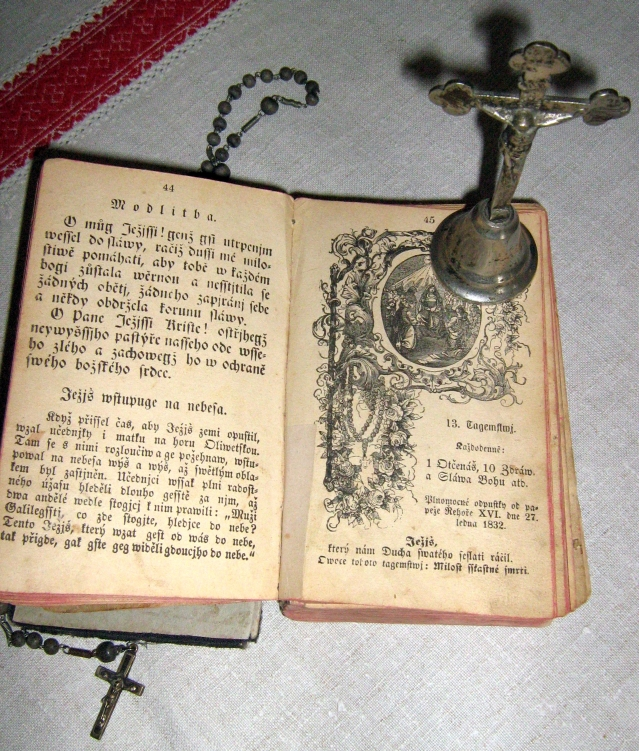
A Slovak Bible and cross

== Gospel of John, 1469 ==
A portion of the Bible, dating back to 1469, was discovered in the library of Esztergom. The section was a handwritten copy of the Gospel of John, written in contemporary Slovak.

== The Camaldolese Bible, 1756 ==
The first vernacular Bibles to enter into use in Slovakia were in Czech, which came to be used among Slovak Protestants. In response the Catholic church arranged for the Camaldolese Benedictines at Červený Kláštor monastery to produce a Catholic Slovak Bible in the 1750s. This translation is accredited to Romuald Hadbavný.

== Catholic Bible translation by Juraj Palkovič, 1829 & 1832 ==
This translation is credited to professor Juraj Palkovič. It used Anton's Bernolák Slovak language (based on cultural western form of Slovak language). It was printed in two parts, first in 1829 and second in 1832. The books full title was Swaté Písmo starého i nowého Zákona: podla obecného latinského od sw. Rímsko-katolíckég Církwi potwrďeného, preložené s Prirownaním ğruntowného Tekstu na Swetlo widané. Ďel prwní, Ďel druhí. W Ostrihome: Josef Beimel, 1829, 1832.

== The Roháček version, 1936 ==
A more modern Slovak version was produced by the Lutheran pastor Jozef Roháček in 1936.

== Ecumenical translation ==
In 2008 the Slovak Bible Society published two versions of the Slovak Ecumenical Translation (with and without the deuterocanonical books).

== See also ==
- Slavic translations of the Bible

== External links to Bibles in Slovak ==
- Rímskokatolícky preklad, Ekumenický preklad, Roháčkov preklad - The Roman Catholic translation, The Ecumenical translation, The Rohacek translation.
- Rímskokatolícky preklad - The Roman Catholic translation. alternative link, alternative link, Sväté písmo
- Roháček version 1934, alternative link, alternative link, Roháček version with search function, pdf version
- Faith Comes By Hearing Audio NT (1997)
