= Sermon =

Oration by a preacher

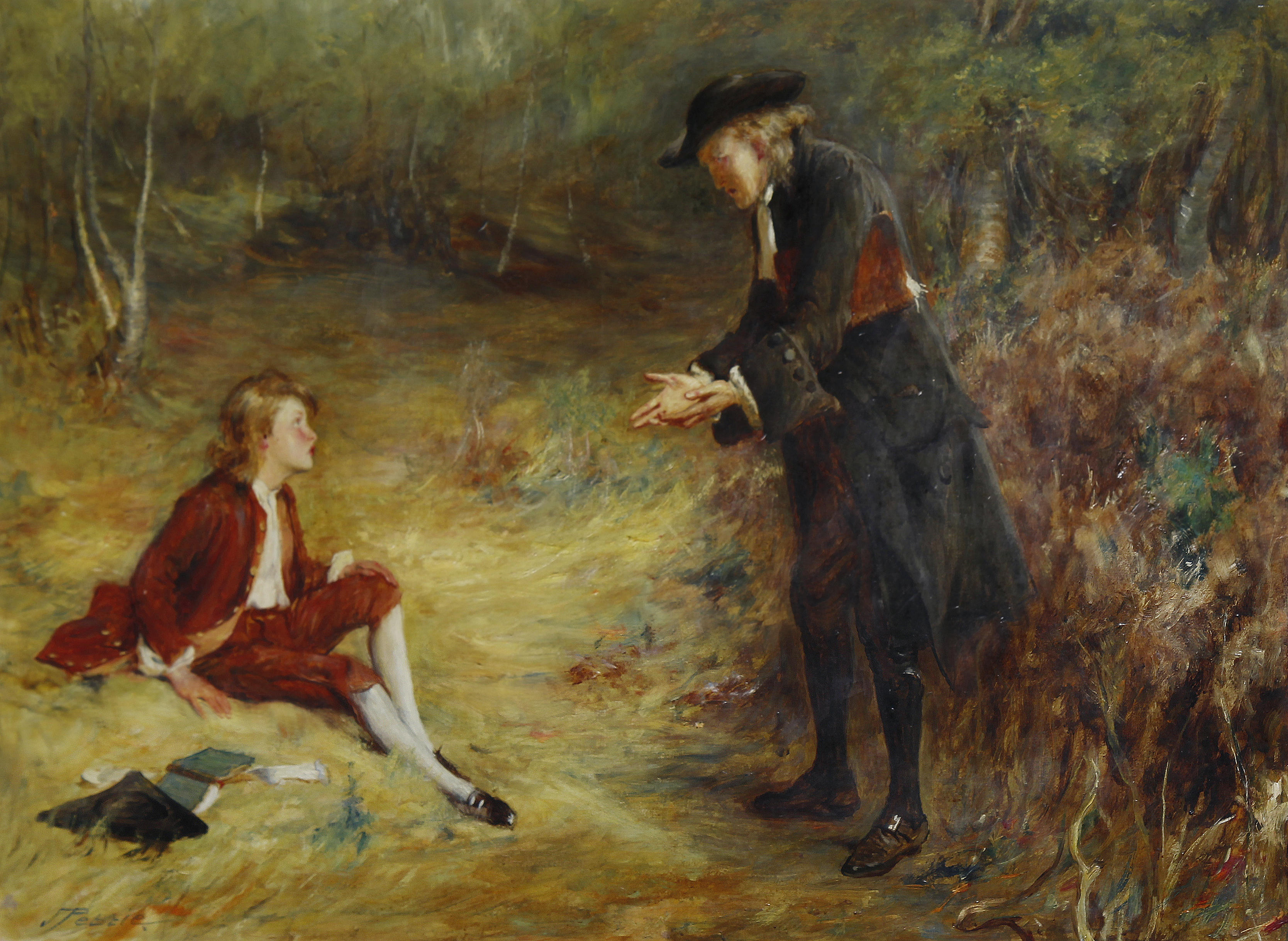
A Roadside Sermon by John Pettie

A sermon is a religious discourse or oration by a preacher, usually a member of clergy. Sermons address a scriptural, theological, or moral topic, usually expounding on a type of belief, law, or behavior within both past and present contexts. Elements of the sermon often include exposition, exhortation, and practical application. The act of delivering a sermon is called preaching. In secular usage, the word sermon may refer, often disparagingly, to a lecture on morals.

In Christian practice, a sermon is usually preached to a congregation in a place of worship, either from an elevated architectural feature, known as a pulpit or an ambo, or from behind a lectern. The word sermon comes from a Middle English word which was derived from Old French, which in turn originates from the Latin word sermō meaning 'discourse.' A sermonette is a short sermon (usually associated with television broadcasting, as stations would present a sermonette before signing off for the night). The Christian Bible contains many speeches without interlocution, which some take to be sermons: Jesus' Sermon on the Mount in Matthew 5–7 (though the gospel writers do not specifically call it a sermon; the popular descriptor for Jesus' speech there came much later); and Peter after Pentecost in Acts 2:14–40. (Note: This speech was delivered to non-Christians and as such is not quite parallel to the popular definition of a sermon.)

In Islam, the equivalent of a sermon is called a khutbah.

== Christianity ==
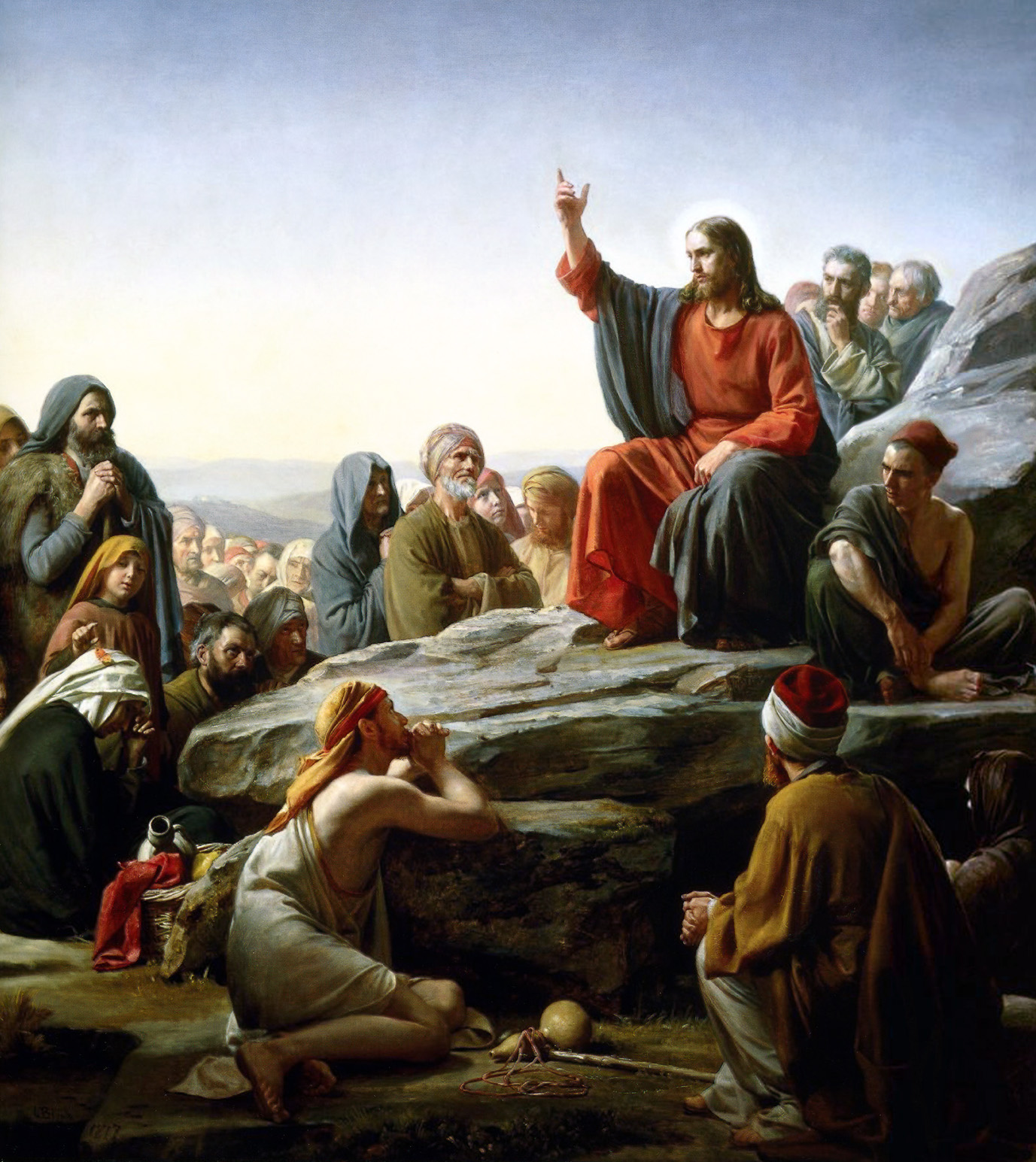
The Sermon on the Mount by Carl Heinrich Bloch, 1877

In Christianity, a sermon is typically identified as an address or discourse delivered to a congregation of Christians, typically containing theological or moral instruction. The sermon by Christian orators was partly based on the tradition of public lectures by classical orators. Although it is often called a homily, the original distinction between a sermon and a homily was that a sermon was delivered by a clergyman (licensed preacher) while a homily was read from a printed copy by a layman. In the 20th century the distinction has become one of the sermon being likely to be longer, have more structure, and contain more theological content. Homilies are usually considered to be a type of sermon, usually narrative or biographical.

The word sermon is used contemporarily to describe many famous moments in Christian (and Jewish) history. The most famous example is the Sermon on the Mount by Jesus of Nazareth. This address was given around 30 AD, and is recounted in the Gospel of Matthew (5:1–7:29, including introductory and concluding material) as being delivered on a mount on the north end of the Sea of Galilee, near Capernaum. It is also contained in some of the other gospel narratives.

During the later history of Christianity, several figures became known for their addresses that later became regarded as sermons. Examples in the early church include Peter (see especially Acts 2:14b–36), Stephen (see Acts 7:1b–53), Tertullian and John Chrysostom. These addresses were used to spread Christianity across Europe and Asia Minor, and as such are not sermons in the modern sense, but evangelistic messages.

The sermon has been an important part of Christian services since early Christianity, and remains prominent in both Roman Catholicism and Protestantism. Lay preachers sometimes figure in these traditions of worship, for example the Methodist local preachers, but in general preaching has usually been a function of the clergy. The Dominican Order is officially known as the Order of Preachers (Ordo Praedicatorum in Latin); friars of this order were trained to publicly preach in vernacular languages, and the order was created by Saint Dominic to preach to the Cathars of southern France in the early 13th century. The Franciscans are another important preaching order; Travelling preachers, usually friars, were an important feature of late medieval Catholicism. In 1448 the church authorities seated at Angers prohibited open-air preaching in France. If a sermon is delivered during the Mass it comes after the Gospel is sung or read. If it is delivered by the priest or bishop that offers the Mass then he removes his maniple, and in some cases his chasuble, because the sermon is not part of the Mass. A bishop preaches his sermon wearing his mitre while seated whereas a priest, or on rare occasions a deacon, preaches standing and wearing his biretta.

A modern pastor preaches with a Bible from a pulpit in North Carolina.

In most denominations, modern preaching is kept below forty minutes, but historic preachers of all denominations could at times speak for several hours, and use techniques of rhetoric and theatre that are today somewhat out of fashion in mainline churches.

During the Middle Ages, sermons inspired the beginnings of new religious institutes (e.g., Saint Dominic and Francis of Assisi). Pope Urban II began the First Crusade in November 1095 at the Council of Clermont, France, when he exhorted French knights to retake the Holy Land.

The academic study of sermons, the analysis and classification of their preparation, composition and delivery, is called homiletics.

A controversial issue that aroused strong feelings in early modern Britain was whether sermons should be read from a fully prepared text, or extemporized, perhaps from some notes. Many sermons have been written down, collected and published; published sermons were a major and profitable literary form, and category of books in the book trade, from at least the Late Antique Church to about the late 19th century. Many clergymen openly recycled large chunks of published sermons in their own preaching. Such sermons include John Wesley's Forty-four Sermons, John Chrysostom's Homily on the Resurrection (preached every Easter in Orthodox churches) and Gregory Nazianzus' homily "On the Theophany, or Birthday of Christ" (preached every Christmas in Orthodox churches). The 80 sermons in German of the Dominican Johannes Tauler (1300–1361) were read for centuries after his death.

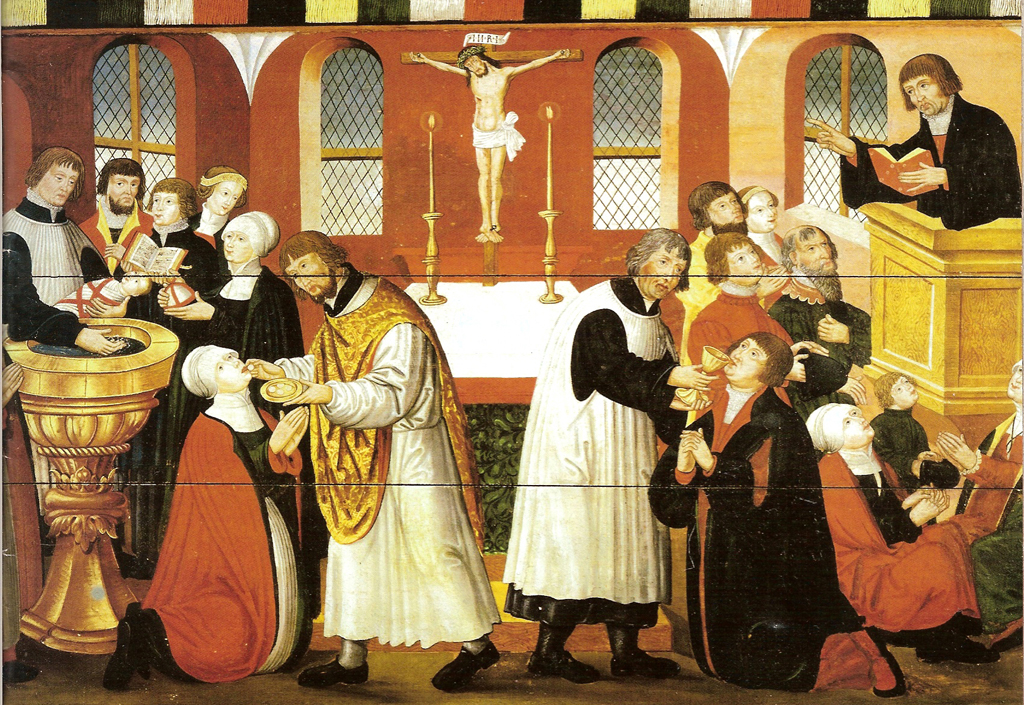
Martin Luther Preaching to Faithful (1561)

Martin Luther published his sermons (Hauspostille) on the Sunday lessons for the edification of readers. This tradition was continued by Martin Chemnitz and Johann Arndt, as well as many others into the following centuries—for example CH Spurgeon's stenographed sermons, The Metropolitan Tabernacle Pulpit. The widow of Archbishop of Canterbury John Tillotson (1630–1694) received £2,500 for the manuscripts of his sermons, a very large sum.

=== Lutheranism and Reformed Christianity ===
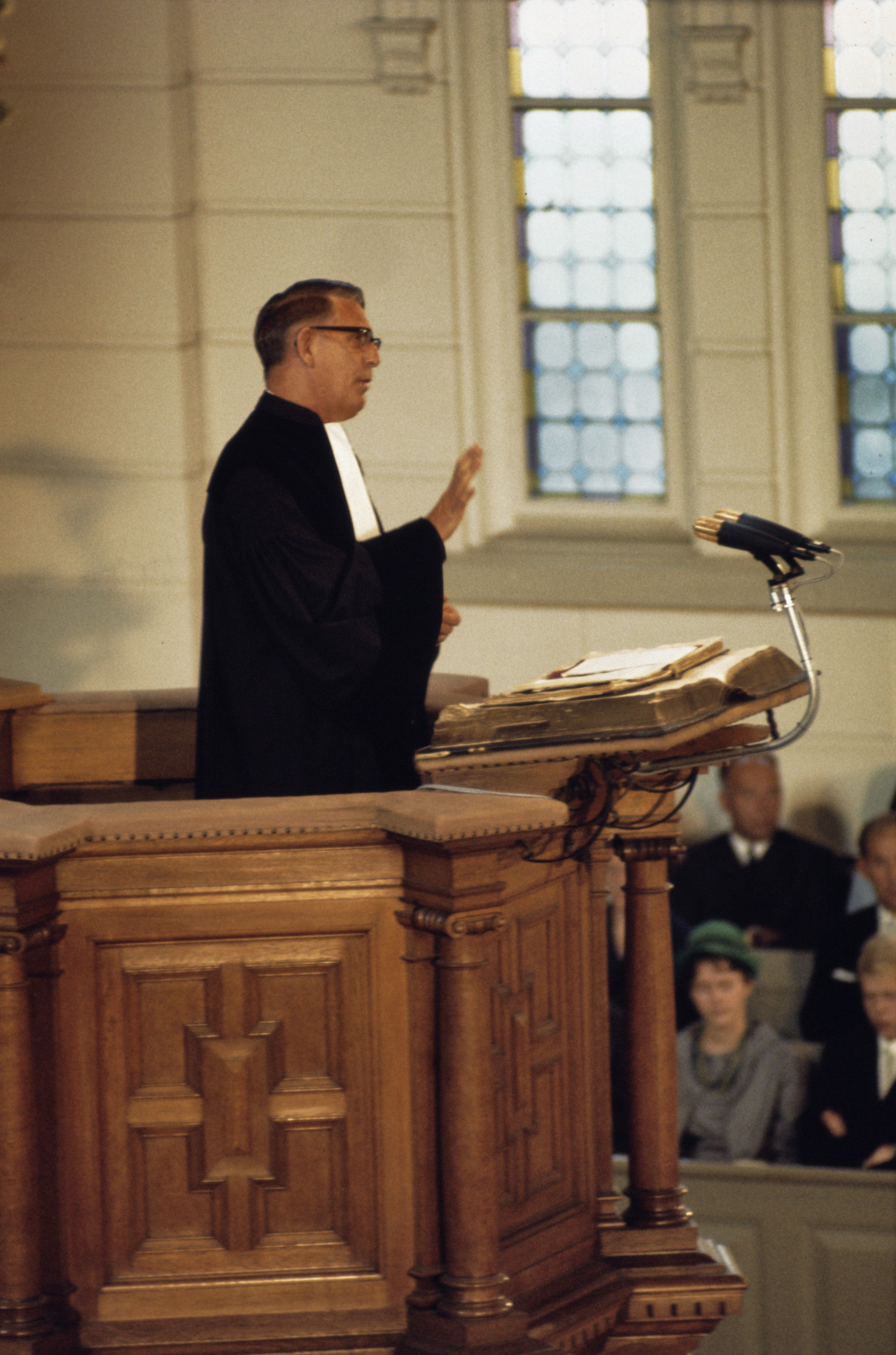
A Reformed Christian minister preaching from a pulpit, 1968

The Reformation led to Protestant sermons, many of which defended the schism with the Roman Catholic Church and explained beliefs about the Bible, theology, and devotion. The distinctive doctrines of Protestantism held that justification was by faith alone, and convincing people to believe the Gospel and place trust in God for their salvation through Jesus Christ was the decisive step in salvation.

The Lutheran Churches gave importance to both the preaching of the Gospel and the celebration of the Eucharist during the Mass (Divine Service). Lutheranism largely preserved the order of the Mass, including the position of the sermon within it, while giving it more prominence. In the Reformed (Continental Reformed, Presbyterian, Anglican and Congregationalist) churches, the sermon came to replace the Eucharist as the central act of worship. While Luther retained the use of the lectionary for selecting texts for preaching, the Swiss Reformers, such as Ulrich Zwingli, Johannes Oecolampadius, and John Calvin, notably returned to the patristic model of preaching through books of the Bible. The goal of Protestant worship, as conditioned by these reforms, was above all to offer glory to God for the gift of grace in Jesus Christ, to rouse the congregation to a deeper faith, and to inspire them to practice works of love for the benefit of the neighbor, rather than carry on with potentially empty rituals.

=== Evangelical Christianity ===
With regard to evangelical Christianity, in the 18th and 19th centuries during the Great Awakening, major (evangelistic) sermons were made at revivals, which were especially popular in the United States. These sermons were noted for their "fire-and-brimstone" message, typified by Jonathan Edwards' famous "Sinners in the Hands of an Angry God" speech. In these sermons the wrath of God was intended to be made evident. Edwards also preached on Religious Affections, which discussed the divided Christian world.

During camp meetings, Methodist preachers are known for their sermons aimed at encouraging congregants to experience the New Birth (first work of grace) and entire sanctification (second work of grace).

In Evangelical Christianity, the sermon is also called the "message". It occupies an important place in worship service, half the time, about 45 to 60 minutes. This message can be supported by a powerpoint, images and videos. In some churches, messages are grouped into thematic series. The one who brings the message is usually a pastor trained either in a bible college or independently. Evangelical sermons are broadcast on the radio, on television channels (televangelism), on the Internet, on web portals, on the website of the churches and through social media like YouTube and Facebook.

=== Roman Catholic ===
Roman Catholic preaching has evolved over time but generally the subject matter is similar. As the famous St. Alphonsus Ligouri states, "With regard to the subject matter of sermons. Those subjects should be selected which move most powerfully to detest sin and to love God; whence the preacher should often speak of the last things of death, of judgment, of Hell, of Heaven, and of eternity. According to the advice of the Holy Spirit, 'Remember your last end, and you shall never sin.' (Eccl. vii. 40)."

Among the most famous Catholic sermons are St. Francis of Assisi's Sermon to the Birds, Saint Anthony Preaching to the Fish, St. Alphonsus Liguori's Italian Sermons for all the Sundays in the year, St. Robert Bellarmine's sermons during the counter-reformation period in Sermons from the Latins, the French The Sermons of the Curé of Ars by St. John Vianney and the Old English sermons of Ælfric of Eynsham.

Michael Bayldon notes with concern that "the Sunday sermon" has become the sole means of continuing the religious education of many Catholics beyond their years in school.

== Islam ==
Khutbah (Arabic: خطبة) serves as the primary formal occasion for public preaching in the Islamic tradition. In societies or communities with (for example) low literacy rates, strong habits of communal worship, and/or limited mass-media, the preaching of sermons throughout networks of congregations can have important informative and prescriptive propaganda functions for both civil and religious authorities—which may regulate the manner, frequency, licensing, personnel and content of preaching accordingly.

== Types ==
There are a number of different types of sermons, that differ both in their subject matter and by their intended audience, and accordingly not every preacher is equally well-versed in every type. Some types of sermon include:

- Biographical sermons – tracing the story of a particular biblical character through a number of parts of the Bible.
- Evangelistic sermons (associated with the Greek word kerygma) – seeking to convert the hearers or bring them back to their previous faith through a recounting of the foundational story of the religion, in Christianity, the Good News.
- Expository preaching – exegesis, that is sermons that expound and explain a text to the congregation.
- Fast sermons - Between January 1642 and April 1649, these were regular sermons preached in the English Parliament on the fourth Wednesday of every month.
- Historical sermons – which seek to portray a biblical story within its non-biblical historical perspective.
- Hortatory sermons (associated with the Greek word didache) – exhort a return to living ethically; in Christianity, a return to living on the basis of the gospel.
- Illuminative sermons, also known as proems (petihta) – which connect an apparently unrelated biblical verse or religious question with the current calendrical event or festival.
- Liturgical sermons – sermons that explain the liturgy, why certain things are done during a service, such as why communion is offered and what it means.
- Narrative sermons – which tell a story, often a parable, or a series of stories, to make a moral point.
- Redemptive-historical preaching – sermons that take into consideration the context of any given text within the broader history of salvation as recorded in the canon of the bible.
- Topical sermons – concerned with a particular subject of current concern;

== Delivery methods ==
Sermons can be both written and spoken out loud. Sermons vary in the amount of time and effort used to prepare them. Some are scripted while others are not.

With the advent of reception theory, researchers also became aware that how sermons are listened to affects their meaning as much as how they are delivered. The expectations of the congregation, their prior experience of listening to oral texts, their level of scriptural education, and the relative social positions—often reflected in the physical arrangement—of sermon-goers vis-a-vis the preacher are part of the meaning of the sermon.

Albert Raboteau describes a common style of Black preaching first developed in America in the early 19th century, and common throughout the 20th and into the 21st centuries:

The preacher begins calmly, speaking in conversational, if oratorical and occasionally grandiloquent, prose; he then gradually begins to speak more rapidly, excitedly, and to chant his words and time to a regular beat; finally, he reaches an emotional peak in which the chanted speech becomes tonal and merges with the singing, clapping, and shouting of the congregation.

=== Impromptu preaching ===
Impromptu preaching is a sermon technique where the preacher exhorts the congregation without any previous preparation. It can be aided with a reading of a Bible passage, aleatory opened or not, or even without any scriptural reference.

The Bible says that the Holy Spirit gives disciples the inspiration to speak:
Matthew 10:16-20

16: Behold, I send you forth as sheep in the midst of wolves: be ye therefore wise as serpents, and harmless as doves.
17: But beware of men: for they will deliver you up to the councils, and they will scourge you in their synagogues;
18: And ye shall be brought before governors and kings for my sake, for a testimony against them and the Gentiles.
19: But when they deliver you up, take no thought how or what ye shall speak: for it shall be given you in that same hour what ye shall speak.
20: For it is not ye that speak, but the Spirit of your Father which speaketh in you.

According to some people, when Jesus says "take no thought how or what ye shall speak" he is saying that it is better not to script your speeches or sermons, but to let the Holy Spirit of your Father speak through you. Others see the expression as simply a comforting exhortation not to worry or be anxious, but to rest confident that God is in control (cf. Phil. 2:12-13). In other places the apostle Paul emphatically underscored the importance of diligent work in study and preparation (I Tim. 4:13-16; II Tim. 2:15).

Today impromptu preaching is practiced by unprogrammed Quakers, Mennonites and some Pentecostals.

=== Extemporaneous preaching ===
Extemporaneous preaching is a style of preaching involving extensive preparation of all the sermon except for the precise wording. The topic, basic structure and scripture to be used are all determined in advance, and the preachers saturate themselves in the details necessary to present their message so thoroughly that they are able to present the message with neither detailed notes nor perhaps even an outline. Consequently, unprepared preachers may find themselves unable to deliver a message with the same precision as people using detailed notes or memorizing detailed aspects of their speech.

While some might say this style is distinct from impromptu preaching, and that the preacher gives no specific preparation to their message, what Charles Spurgeon referred to as "impromptu preaching" he considered to be the same as extemporaneous preaching. In his sermon "The Faculty of Impromptu Speech", he describes extemporaneous preaching as a process of the preacher immersing himself in the Scriptures and prayer, knowing it so well that he only needs to find the appropriate words in the moment that the sermon is given. He states,

Only thoughtless persons think this to be easy; it is at once the most laborious and the most efficient mode of preaching[.]

Henry Ware Jr. states,

The first thing to be observed is, that the student who would acquire facility in this art, should bear it constantly in mind, and have regard to it in all his studies and in his whole mode of study.

On the other hand, it is distinct from many other forms of memorized preaching. Proponents claim that the importance of preaching demands it be extemporaneous.

A reflecting mind will feel as if it were infinitely out of place to present in the pulpit to immortal souls, hanging upon the verge of everlasting death, such specimens of learning and rhetoric.

— Charles Finney

The style was popular in the late 19th century among Baptist (Primitive Baptist especially), Methodist, Unitarian, and some Presbyterians preachers, such as Blackleach Burritt. Some of the more famous preachers who employed it were Charles Haddon Spurgeon, Charles Grandison Finney and Peter Cartwright.

== Secular usage ==
In informal usage, the word sermon is used in secular terms, usually disapprovingly, to refer to "a long talk in which someone advises other people how they should behave in order to be better people".

== See also ==
Buddhism

- Dharma talk (Dhamma talk)
- Pariyatti
- Agga Maha Pandita

Christianity

- Expository preaching
- Extemporaneous preaching
- Popular Sermon of the Medieval Friar
- List of preachers
- Redemptive-historical preaching

Judaism

- Jewish ethics
- Jewish meditation
- Rabbinical literature
- Midrash
- Musar literature

Islam

- Nahj al Balagha
- Qur'an reading
- The Sermon for Necessities
