= Sinim =

Unknown nation mentioned in the Bible

The land of Sin (Hebrew: סִין) or Sinim (from: Hebrew: סִינִים, i.e. the inhabitants of the land of Sin, or the people of Sin) is a biblical hapax legomenon that appears in Isaiah 49:12: "Behold, these shall come from far: and, lo, these from the north and from the west; and these from the land of Sinim." The Greek Septuagint instead says, "from the land of the Persians."

Some English versions simply transliterate the word, others translate the Hebrew as Syene (Aswan), and still others associate Sin with China. Sinim resembles Sinae, the Latinization of Qin, after the Qin state, founded in 778 BC, and the Qin dynasty, founded in 221 BC by Qin Shi Huang-Di.

Young's Analytical Concordance to the Bible (1879) defines the word as "a people in the far east; the Chinese?" The International Standard Bible Encyclopedia (1915) says, "The land is clearly far off, and it must be sought either in the South or in the East. Many scholars have favored identification with China, the classical Sinae. It seems improbable that Jews had already found their way to China; but from very early times trade relations were established with the Far East by way of Arabia and the Persian Gulf; and the name may have been used by the prophet simply as suggesting extreme remoteness....While no certain decision is possible, probability points to the East, and China cannot be quite ruled out." Modern translations of the Bible tend to translate Sinim as Syene (ancient Aswan) because the Great Isaiah Scroll of the Dead Sea Scrolls uses that word.

In the Vulgate, Jerome of Stridon translated “Sinim” as "Terra Australis" into Latin. Also, Sinim may be derived from the old Hebrew words "Sinah" or "Sneh", meaning a hostile bush. This lends credence to the purely speculative thesis that Sinim – according to Isaiah 49 – refers to a land of bushes located at the ends of the Earth, i.e. Australia, although Jews and Europeans had no knowledge of it at the time. This thesis was notably put forward by Herbert Armstrong to justify British Israelism.

Bible Version	Translation
American Standard Version; Amplified Bible; Amplified Bible, Classic Edition; Christian Standard Bible; Common English Bible; Contemporary English Version; Douay-Rheims 1899; English Standard Version; Geneva Bible 1599; Good News Translation; International Standard Version; King James Version; Living Bible; The Message; New American Standard Bible; New Century Version; New International Version; New King James Version; New Living Translation; Revised Standard Version	Sinim; Aswan (southern Egypt); Sinim (China); Sinim [perhaps modern Aswan]; Southland; city of Syene; South country; land of Syene; Sinim [meaning South country]; Aswan in the south; China; Sinim; south; all the way down the Nile; Sinim; Aswan in Southern Egypt; region of Aswan; Sinim; as far south as Egypt; land of Syene

== In Latter-day Saint theology ==
In language nearly identical to that of the King James Version, First Nephi 21:12 in the Book of Mormon reads: “And then, O house of Israel, behold, these shall come from far; and lo, these from the north and from the west; and these from the land of Sinim.” The index of this scripture of the Church of Jesus Christ of Latter-day Saints defines Sinim as “possibly [the] land of China”.
