= Popular sermon =

Christian sermon

The popular sermon (sermo modernus "modern sermon" in Latin) was a type of sermon in vernacular, the language of common people, that was commonly delivered by Catholic friars of the Franciscan and Dominican orders in the Middle Ages, on Sundays, Feast Days, and other special dates.

== History ==
In the Middle Ages, the Catholic mass ritual included a sermon in the vernacular.

== Characteristics ==
A sermon focuses on an aspect of a selected theme (thema) taken from the Gospel reading of the day. The popular sermon began with a thema, a lesson based on the gospel of the day. The prothema or antethema, a statement and/or prayer by the preacher, followed the thema. Sometimes the preacher skipped the prothema and delivered a prelocution, proof of the thema, by citing sources of authority instead. The thema was then restated and followed by the process, a breakdown of multiple parts of the thema—the historical, allegorical (personified), tropological (moralized), and anagogical (the mystical). Finally, the sermon would close with a recitation (a quick review) and a benediction (blessing).

== Audience ==
The popular sermon was delivered in local churches, to people of high and low estate. When the churches were too small to contain the audience, the sermon was then moved to the public green. In either setting, the audience was usually unconstrained and could be rude and discourteous to the preacher. It was not uncommon for the people in attendance to move freely about and socialize with one another, address the friar, or walk out on the friar in the middle of his sermon. Thus, to keep the attention of the people, the popular sermon needed to be short and include elements which the people could relate to or find interest in. The friar might tell an anecdote, use folklore or verse sermon. To help make a point, it was not uncommon for the friar to embellish concerns of good and evil. The friar would use the occasional large word or a word from a foreign language to impress the lay audience. The result was a vibrant, creative and well-received sermon.

== Training and licensure ==
All friars were required to be trained and licensed by the church before they were allowed to preach. The friars studied treatises on sermon making. These treatises dictated that the preacher should speak slowly, clearly and in a serious manner; he was to remain focused; he should dress, speak, and behave in a conservative manner; and, when speaking, he should neither stand still nor be flamboyant with his gestures. Although the treatise dictated the friars follow these directives, the friars bent the rules as they saw fit.

== Published sermons ==
The friars wrote their own sermons or they based their sermon upon the written works of other friars and clergy. The four classifications of the popular sermon were the improvised, the prepared, the memorized, and the read (Roberts, 77). Many of the popular sermons from this era were published—meaning that they were either preached in the vernacular or written down in Latin, but not necessarily both (Roberts, 77). Most of the written sermons that were later preached were not verbatim to the written word. As the sermon was written in Latin and the oratory was done in the vernacular, the words changed with the translation. This is the dual nature of the popular sermon. The most accurate resources available to us today are the sermons that were written by a person of the clergy in the audience who took notes (in Latin) and formally recorded with the intent to be used as a resource. A great number of these documents are available today in manuscript form; some are available in published collections. These popular sermons provide an authentic insight to the people and the times.

== Bibliography ==
- Barone, Giulia. "Mendicant Orders." Encyclopedia of the Middle Ages. Ed. Andre Vauchez, Trans. Adrian Walford, Oxford: Oxford UP, 2001. 7 Feb. 2008
- Bolton, Brenda M. "Friars, Mendicant." Medieval England: An Encyclopedia. Ed. Paul E. Szarmach, et al. New York: Garland Publishing, Inc., 1998.
- Chapman, Coolidge Otis. [Untitled]. Review of The Popular Sermon of the Medieval Friar in England. Modern Language Notes, 53.7 (Nov. 1938).
- Georgiana Donavin, Cary J. Nederman, and Richard Utz, eds. Speculum Sermonis: Interdisciplinary Reflections on the Medieval Sermon. Turnhout: Brepols, 2007.
- Fleming, John V. "The Friars and Medieval English Literature." The Cambridge History of Medieval English Literature. Ed. David Wallace. Cambridge, Cambridge UP, 1999. 349–75.
- Lauwers, Michel. "Pastoral Teaching." Encyclopedia of the Middle Ages. Ed. Andre Vauchez, Trans. Adrian Walford, Oxford: Oxford UP, 2001. 27 Feb. 2008.
- Longère, Jean. "Sermon." Encyclopedia of the Middle Ages. Ed. Andre Vauchez, Trans. Adrian Walford, Oxford: Oxford UP, 2001. 27 Feb. 2008.
- Pfander, Homer G. The Popular Sermon of the Medieval Friar in England. Thesis. New York University, 1937.
- Roberts, Phyllis B. "Preaching and Sermon Literature, Western European." Dictionary of the Middle Ages. Ed. Joseph R. Strayer. Vol. 10. New York: Charles Scribner's Sons, 1988.
- Rusconi, Roberto. "Preaching." Encyclopedia of the Middle Ages. Ed. Andre Vauchez, Trans. Adrian Walford, Oxford: Oxford UP, 2001. 27 Feb. 2008.
- Scahill, John. "Friars' Miscellanies." Medieval England: An Encyclopedia. Ed. Paul E. Szarmach, et al. New York: Garland Publishing, Inc., 1998.
- Szarmach, Paul E. and Alan J. Fletcher. "Middle English Period." Medieval England: An Encyclopedia. Ed. Paul E. Szarmach, et al. New York: Garland Publishing, Inc., 1998.
- ———. "Sermons and Homilies." Medieval England: An Encyclopedia. Ed. Paul E. Szarmach, et al. New York: Garland Publishing, Inc., 1998.
