= Frankfurt silver inscription =

Oldest known evidence of Christianity north of the Alps

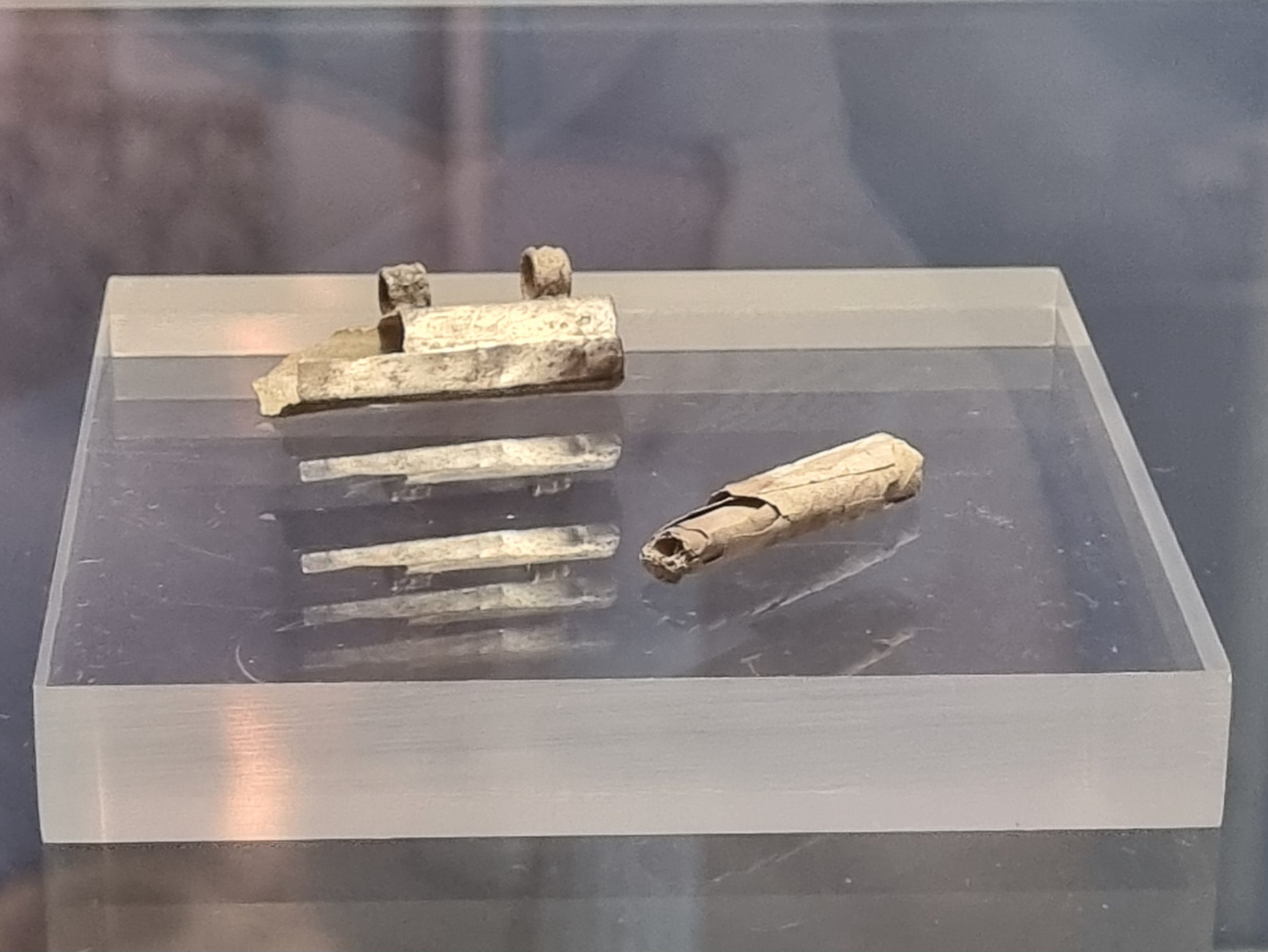
The amulet capsule with two eyelets and the rolled-up silver foil in the Frankfurt Archaeological Museum

The Frankfurt silver inscription is an early Christian silver amulet from the 3rd century, originating from the Roman settlement of Nida. The amulet was discovered in 2018 during excavations at a Roman-period burial ground in Frankfurt-Praunheim and is now part of the collections of the Archaeological Museum Frankfurt am Main. In 2024, the rolled-up silver foil was digitally "unrolled" and deciphered with the help of computed tomography. The inscription is considered one of the earliest material testimonies of Christianity north of the Alps and provides valuable insights into early Christian devotional practices in the border regions of the Latin West.

== Place of discovery ==
The Frankfurt amulet was recovered during archaeological excavations at the burial ground on Heilmannstraße in Frankfurt-Praunheim. Known since the late 19th century, the burial ground is located on the northwestern edge of the ancient city of Nida, which, as the capital of the civitas Taunensium, was one of the most important urban centers in the Roman province of Germania Superior. The settlement developed from a military base in the 70s AD and, after the withdrawal of the troops in the early 2nd century, underwent a rapid transformation into a culturally and economically prosperous city. At the beginning of the 3rd century, the city reached the peak of its urban development. Fortifications testify to the importance and defensibility of the city during this phase. From the 250s onward, Nida experienced a swift decline, largely as a consequence of persistent conflicts in the frontier provinces, a process clearly reflected in widespread abandonment. By 275/280 AD at the latest, the settlement had been completely deserted, marking a profound rupture in its settlement history. The abandonment of the town simultaneously provides the terminus ante quem for the dating of the amulet. The grave goods recovered in situ—a censer and a ceramic vessel—support dating the burial to the period between approximately 230 and 260 AD.

The cemetery on Heilmannstraße was investigated in 2017 and 2018 by the Heritage Office of the City of Frankfurt am Main. Over an area of roughly 500 m², a total of 127 graves could be documented. The location of the burial ground is noteworthy, as it lay in the northwestern periphery of the ancient urban area and—unlike the other necropoleis of Nida—was not situated directly along a main traffic route.

The burials were clearly dominated by inhumations. Of the 127 interments, 113 belonged to this category, whereas at other cemeteries in Nida inhumations account for only around 10% of the burials. Notably, 45 of the 113 inhumations were devoid of any grave goods, while the remaining burials were characterised by an exceptionally diverse range of grave furnishings. Particularly noteworthy is the high number of glass vessels, which have not previously been attested in the older necropoleis of the urban area. In addition, there is a wide variety of jewellery items, including beads made of glass, jet, and semi-precious stones such as rock crystal. Also remarkable is the presence of 14 pairs of shoes placed beside the feet or at the lower legs of the deceased.

In this context, particular significance was attached to the discovery of a silver amulet capsule, which lay beneath the chin of a man aged approximately 35 to 45 years (grave no. 134) buried in an inhumation grave and contained a rolled-up silver foil bearing an incised inscription.

== Property description ==
The recovered object, which was transferred to the collection of the Frankfurt Archaeological Museum after its discovery, consists of a 3.5 cm long silver capsule containing a wafer-thin, badly damaged silver foil. On one of its long sides, the capsule has small eyelets for the leather cord or strap with which it could be attached to the wearer's body. Initial material analyses in 2019 indicated that the silver plate bore an inscription, but this could not be deciphered at the time. It was only through high-resolution CT scans and virtual smoothing of the crumpled foil at the Leibniz Center for Archaeology in Mainz (LEIZA) in May 2024 that the inscription could be fully captured. The inscription comprises 18 lines and is about 9 cm long.

== Script and language ==
A first palaeographic reconstruction and transcription was published by Markus Scholz. The text is written in cursive script and displays a mixture of upper- and lowercase letters, a feature also encountered in roman graffiti and curse tablets. It therefore does not represent the elegant calligraphy found on official inscriptions or monuments. Greek terms appear in the text, rendered in Latin script. The Latin language of the inscription and the popular cursive hand situate its owner culturally and socially within a vernacular milieu. Nevertheless, the language may certainly be regarded as sophisticated.

== The Frankfurt object as an amulet ==
The classification of the object as a protective amulet rests both on its external form and on the content of the inscription. Protective amulets were widespread in antiquity and, with the spread of Christianity, increasingly adopted Christian motifs. Since most known Christian amulets emerged only from the 4th cent. onward, the Frankfurt specimen represents an exceptionally early example. Whereas many early Christian amulets still exhibit a mixture of Christian and pagan elements, the protective invocation on the Frankfurt amulet is directed exclusively to Jesus Christ.

It is also remarkable that the text was engraved on a fine silver plate, since the majority of known amulets are made of more perishable materials such as papyrus or parchment. Although metallic amulets—usually of gold or silver—are also known from the Hellenistic world, they remained rare. In this respect, the Frankfurt specimen is therefore unique; another known Christian silver amulet does not date until the fifth century CE. The material itself is of particular significance, as it was closely related to the function of the object. Curse texts were typically inscribed on lead tablets, whereas protective texts were preferably written on more precious metals. The choice of silver thus also emphasizes the amulet’s protective purpose.

Another striking feature is the use of the Latin language, since the majority of surviving amulets are written in Greek. The cursive script suggests a vernacular milieu of both the writer and the wearer. Later Greek-language amulets occasionally incorporated words from other tongues—such as Hebrew or Aramaic—to invoke the magical powers believed to reside in those words. The inscription on the Frankfurt amulet likewise exhibits this phenomenon: the word agios ("holy") appears three times in Latin transliteration, and the names Jesus Christ (Iesous Christos) are rendered in abbreviated form with an overline (I͞H X͞P), following the tradition of the nomina sacra. The author may have known this way of writing the name of Christ from Greek manuscripts.

== Transcripti and translation ==
Transcription and translation are difficult because the inscription is only accessible digitally via CT. This makes it difficult to identify the type and direction of the incisions, which are important for deciphering individual letters. In addition, the text has large gaps, especially at the beginning of lines, which are further complicated by the uneven size of the letters in Latin cursive. Santiago Guijarro suggests the following reading of the text:

	Transcript	Translation
1	In nomine sancti Tit̅i.	In the name of Saint Titus
2	Agios, agios, agios.	Holy, Holy, Holy
3	In nomine I͞H X͞P Dei f(ilii),	In the name of Jesus Christ Son of God.
4	mundi dominus,	The Lord of the world
5	viribus omnibus	with all his might
6	incurs ionibus oponit.	faces attacks.
7	Deus valetudinibus	God, to the diseases
8	salvis accessum	healed grants access
9	praestat. Haec salus tueat	This salvation (this amulet?) may protect
10	hominem, qui se	the man who himself
11	dedit voluntati	surrendered to the will
12	Domini I͞H X͞P ti Dei f(ilii).	of the Lord Jesus Christ Son of God.
13	Quoniam I͞H X͞Po	For before Jesus Christ
14	omnes genua flec-	everyone knees shall
15	tent, caelestes,	bend, those of heavens,
16	terrestres et	those of the earth and
17	inferi, et omnis lin-	those underneath and all tongue
18	gua confiteatur.	confess.

== Content description ==
In terms of content, the text can be divided into four parts:

1. Invocation of Titus (lines 1–2);
2. Invocation of Jesus Christ (lines 3–9a);
3. Request for protection (line 9b);
4. Scripture quotation reinforcing the request (lines 13–18).

=== Invocation of Titus (lines 1–2) ===
The inscription opens with an invocation of Saint Titus, who is presumably to be identified with the disciple of the Apostle Paul—an assumption that would be consistent with the citation of a Pauline letter at the close of the brief text, in which Titus himself appears as a companion of the Apostle (2 Cor 2:12; 7:6; 7:13–14; 8:6; 8:16; 8:23; Gal 2:1–3; 2 Tim 4:10; Tit 1:5). The earliest accounts of this saint stem from a later period and associate him with Crete and other Greek islands. The mention of Titus at the outset is noteworthy in several respects: first, the invocation of saints—though it became widespread only in the fourth and fifth centuries—was still uncommon in the mid-third century; second, it is striking that the text begins not with an appeal to God or to Jesus Christ, but to a saint.

Following the invocation of Saint Titus, the Trisagion—agios, agios, agios—appears in Greek, though written in Latin script. The use of Latin letters may suggest that the author knew the phrase only orally. The formula itself derives from the acclamation of the seraphim in Isaiah 6:3 and the cry of the four living creatures in the heavenly liturgy of the Apocalypse (Rev 4:8). In the biblical texts, it is addressed to YHWH in the temple or to the One enthroned. In the present inscription, however, it occurs in conjunction with the preceding invocation and must therefore—lacking a more convincing reconstruction—be understood as referring to Saint Titus.

The Trisagion proves to be both historically and liturgically significant. While the earliest known attestations of the "Thrice Holy" on amulets date only from the fifth century, and its liturgical fixation from the fourth, the Frankfurt object pushes the earliest documented use of the Trisagion on amulets considerably further back in time. This raises fundamental questions regarding the direction and chronology of the interactions between biblical text, liturgical tradition, and popular-magical practice. It is conceivable that the Trisagion was transferred from the liturgy to the realm of amulets—implying that its use in worship is considerably older than previously assumed—or, conversely, that the formula was received independently from biblical tradition into "magical" contexts and only later became institutionalized in the liturgy.

=== Invocation of Jesus Christ (lines 3-9a) ===
From this point onward, the invocation (in nomine) is directed toward Jesus Christ, who is credited with the power to protect the bearer of the amulet and to bring healing. The first line combines several honorific titles, linking the Greek nomina sacra I͞H X͞P with Latin abbreviations. Evidently, the scribe regarded the nomina sacra less as Greek letters than as symbolic shorthand. In two of the three instances, I͞H X͞P is followed by the abbreviation Dei f(ilii), which here designates the divine sonship of Jesus; the varying capitalization supports this interpretation. The title "Lord of the World" (mundi dominus) likewise refers to Jesus and corresponds to the tradition of imperial honorifics, as does the title "God" (Deus).

=== Request for protection (line 9b) ===
From line 9b onward, the text addresses the recipient (hominem), expressing the wish that this amulet may protect its wearer. Lines 10–11 prescribe the conduct expected of one who seeks the protection of Jesus: to submit to the will of Christ. The phrase se dedit recalls a dedicatory formula, while voluntati Domini may allude either to Jesus’ teaching on obedience to the will of the Father or to Paul’s exhortations to discern and to do the will of the Lord. Line 12 gathers several of Jesus’ titles: Domini I͞H X͞P D(ei) F(ilii). Their meaning corresponds to the observations made regarding lines 3–4.

=== Scripture quotation reinforcing the request (lines 13–18) ===
The final part of the text quotes Philippians 2:10–11, the closing lines of the Philippians Hymn, thereby reinforcing the petition expressed in lines 9b–12. This is the earliest extant Latin version of this passage, only slightly later than the oldest Greek manuscripts. Although a Latin translation of the New Testament was already known to exist in North Africa around Carthage by the end of the second century, the earliest surviving Latin manuscripts are of a much later date.

The passage is connected to what precedes it by a causal conjunction (quoniam = "because," "since") rather than by a final one (ut = "so that"), as in the Greek original (hina) or in Novatian (ca. 250) and the various versions of the Vetus Latina. This form of introduction corresponds to the citation formulas commonly found in the New Testament and early Christian literature (ὅτι [γέγραπται] = "for it is written"), from which Guijarro concludes that the author regarded the quoted words as sacred Scripture. At the same time, the text cites only the concluding verses of the hymn and joins them to a preceding petition. In the hymn, the submission to Jesus is presented as the consequence of his humiliation; in the amulet text, by contrast, this submission becomes the very foundation of his power.

The Latin translation in nomine Iesu is replaced here by the nomina sacra I͞H X͞Po, possibly out of reverence. Unlike in lines 3 and 12, the abbreviation D(ei) F(ilii) does not follow; the final o most likely serves to indicate the grammatical case of the noun. The singular "every knee" (omne genu) of the biblical text is rendered in the plural ("all knees") in the amulet inscription, thereby emphasizing the universal subjection of all beings—celestial, earthly, and infernal—to Christ. This alteration likely serves to underscore even more strongly the power of Christ and, by extension, the amulet’s protective efficacy.

== Interpretation of the amulet ==
=== Pauline tradition ===
The text of the amulet exhibits several connections to the communal life of an early Christian group. The threefold repetition of the adjective "holy" is most plausibly understood within the context of liturgical acclamations. The use of the Greek nomina sacra likewise points to the influence of liturgical or communal scribal practice, since such abbreviations likely derive from manuscripts that were read aloud in worship. Particularly noteworthy is the invocation of Saint Titus, which—when considered alongside the quotation from the Epistle to the Philippians—indicates a Pauline tradition. The choice of a Pauline passage is striking, as early Christian amulets more commonly cite verses from the Gospels; this choice therefore testifies to a special esteem for the Pauline letters within the milieu in which the amulet originated.

At the same time, the Latin translation, which diverges from later textual forms, attests to an early transmission of the New Testament into Latin. Parallels with Novatian and the Acta Scillitanorum further demonstrate that the Pauline tradition remained vibrant within the Latin-speaking communities of Rome and North Africa. Taken together, these indications suggest that the amulet emerged from a milieu deeply rooted in the Pauline tradition of early Christianity.

=== Christology and soteriology ===
A distinctive feature of the inscription is its consistently Christocentric orientation: all religious formulas refer exclusively to Jesus of Nazareth, while pagan deities or spirits—commonly invoked in many contemporary Christian-syncretistic amulets—are entirely absent. Moreover, neither a binitarian nor a trinitarian conception of God stands at the center of the text; neither God the Father nor the Holy Spirit is mentioned, placing the focus unequivocally on Christology. Unlike other amulets, there are no allusions to the beginnings of the Gospels or to Jesus’ healings and exorcisms, suggesting a distinctly christological emphasis. This focus is articulated through the titles attributed to Jesus, the powers ascribed to him, and the grounding of his lordship in the citation of Philippians 2:10–11.

The repeated use of the nomina sacra, apparently as ideograms, demonstrates both reverence for the name of Jesus and the intention to highlight it visually. The fact that two occurrences are accompanied by the abbreviation DF (Dei filius) explicitly underscores the sonship—and thus the divine status—of Christ. The titles "Son of God," "Lord of the World," and "God" draw upon biblical and Pauline formulas and, within the text, serve to legitimize Jesus’ power to protect from harm and to bestow healing. At the same time, these titles carry an imperial resonance, so that—within the context of the Roman limes—the underlying message emerges: it is Jesus, not the emperor, who is the true Lord.

The citation of Philippians 2:10–11 reinforces this universal lordship of Christ, further accentuated through the modified quotations (causal instead of final conjunction; "all" instead of "every knee"). In this way, submission is no longer presented merely as the consequence of Christ’s humiliation, but as the very foundation of his authority. Taken as a whole, the amulet articulates an orthodox yet practice-oriented Christology—one that, in the borderlands of the Empire, invokes the sovereign, cosmic, and at the same time protective power of Jesus.

=== The amulet as an everyday object ===
The Frankfurt amulet documents a practical, everyday-oriented Christianity that is distinct from the academic theological writings of the Church Fathers. Its Pauline allusions and its particular Christology serve less doctrinal ends than the immediate need for protection. Because it contains no magical formulas or pagan invocations, it belonged to the "orthodox" amulets tolerated in patristic literature and thus attests to a legitimized form of popular piety. Material— a sheet of silver housed in a neck-case—and its usage leave no doubt that it was intended for personal, mobile protection in everyday life, not for liturgical exposition or rites.

== Literature ==
- Harald Buchinger: Die „Frankfurter Silberinschrift“. Heiliger Dienst 78/4 (2025), pp. 304–306.
- Santiago Guijarro: The Frankfurt Amulet. Popular Christianity in the Limes Germanicus. Isidorianum 34/1 (2025), pp. 25–48.
- Piotr Kubasiak: Mit den Dogmen zaubern? Die magische Verwendung des christlichen Credos zwischen Zauberei und symbolischer Kommunikation. In Andreas Vonach et al. (ed.): Kult – Magie – Ritual. Festschrift für Reinhard Meßner zum 65. Geburtstag, Innsbruck 2025, pp. 301–318.
- Eckhard Nordhofen: Ein Christliches Tetragram. Merkur 912 (2025), pp. 82–86.
