= Jozef Roháček =

Slovak activist (1877–1962)

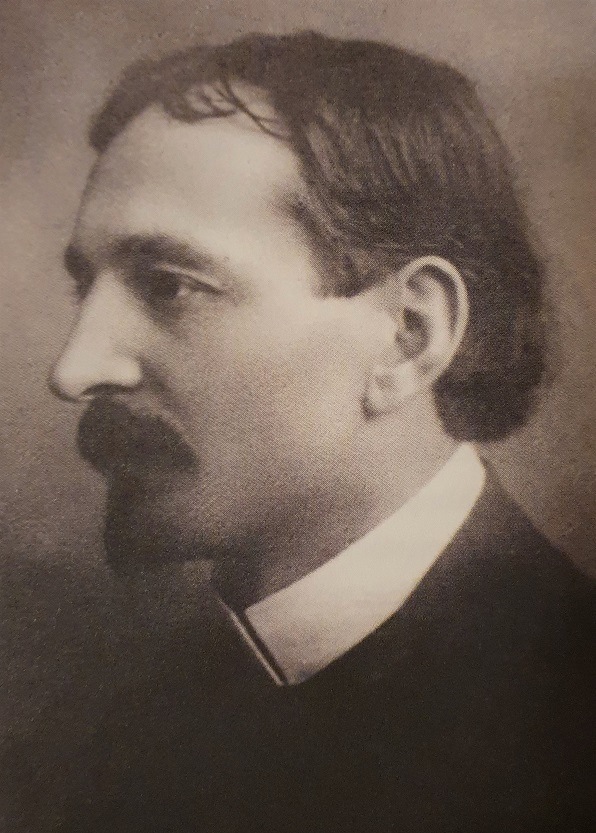
- Born: 6 February 1877; Stará Turá, na Jazvinách, u Dornákov, Austro-Hungarian Empire, (present-day Slovakia)
- Died: 28 July 1962 (aged 85); Bratislava, Czechoslovakia, (present-day Slovakia)
- Citizenship: Austro-Hungarian Empire, Czechoslovakia, Slovakia
- Occupations: Lutheran priest, missionary, writer, editor
- Known for: The first translation of Bible from original languages into Slovak
- Spouse: Ružena Vraná from Tisovec
- Children: Ivan Vladimír Roháček, Viera Roháčková, Miloš Roháček

Jozef Roháček (6 February 1877 – 28 July 1962) was a Slovak Protestant activist, evangelist and scholar.

He translated the Bible from original languages into Slovak. The first edition of the complete Lutheran Slovak Bible was edited by British and Foreign Bible Society in 1936. The revised edition was printed in Kutná Hora (Czech Republic) in 1951.

== Publications ==
- Evolucionizmus vo svetle pravdy alebo čo má každý vzdelaný človek vedieť o evolucionizme (Evolutionism in the light of truth or what should every literate person know about evolutionism), Bratislava, Svetlo, 1936
