= Joel Manuel Hoffman =

American novelist

- Born: Joel Manuel Hoffman; September 15, 1968 (age 57); New York City, U.S.
- Occupation: Writer
- Writing career
- Genres: Spy fiction, crime, mystery, thriller
- Website: www.jm-hoffman.com

Joel Manuel Hoffman (also known under the pen name of J. M. Hoffman) is an American scholar, writer, speaker, and novelist known for his criticism of the Christian fundamentalism's style of Biblical interpretation. He has served as a translator for the ten volume series of My People's Prayer Book.

== Bibliography ==
=== The Warwick Files ===
1. Checkpoint (December 2012)
2. Revenge (March 2013)

=== Non-fiction ===
- In the Beginning: A Short History of the Hebrew Language (2004)
- And God Said: How Translations Conceal the Bible's Original Meaning (2009)
- The Bible's Cutting Room Floor: The Holy Scriptures Missing From Your Bible (2014)

=== As translator ===
- My People's Prayer Book (Volumes 1–10)
