= Bade Purush Dargah =

Dargah (shrine) located at Dikauli village, Shravasti district, Uttar Pradesh, India

Dargah Bade Purush Baba Dikauli Sharif
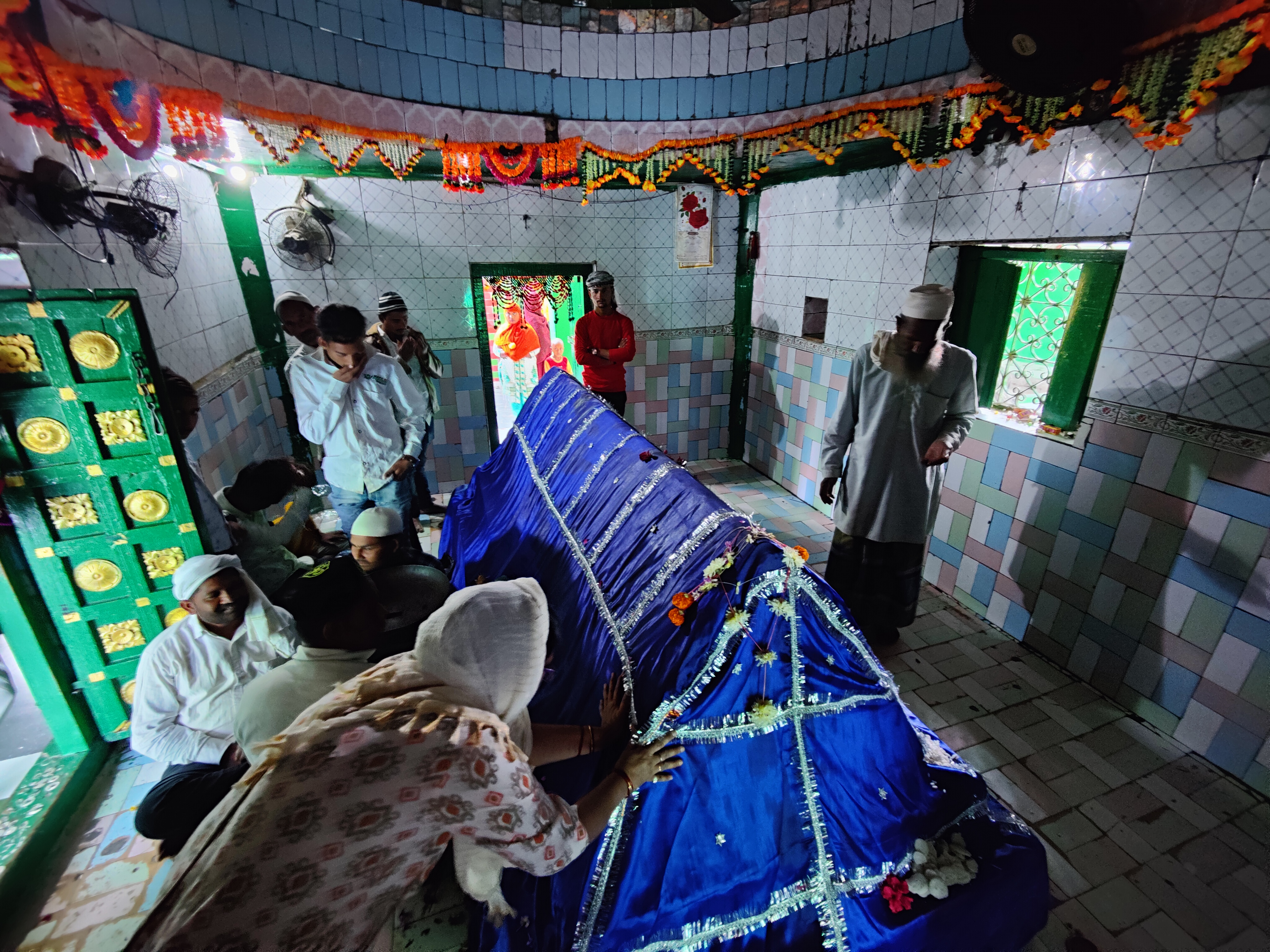
- Tomb of Hazrat Ameer Nasrullah alias Bade Purush or Budhwa Baba

Religion
- Affiliation: Islam
- District: Shravasti
- Province: Uttar Pradesh
- Deity: Hazrat Ameer Nasrullah alias Bade Purush or Budhwa Baba
- Ecclesiastical or organisational status: Shrine
- Status: Active

Location
- Location: Dikauli Village, Pipri, Shravasti District, Uttar Pradesh, 271804
- State: Uttar Pradesh
- Country: India

Architecture
- Type: Mosque, Sufi mausoleum
- Style: Modern

Dargah Bade Purush Baba Dikauli Sharif or Bade Purush Dargah is a dargah (shrine) located at Dikauli village in Shravasti district of Uttar Pradesh, India near Bahraich. It is the dargah of Hazrat Ameer Nasrullah or Nasrullah Shah or Hazrat Saiyyad Nasrullah Gaazi or Mir Nasrullah, who is famously known as Bade Purush or Bade Purukh and Budhwa Baba. Bade Purush is revered by both the Muslims and Hindus.

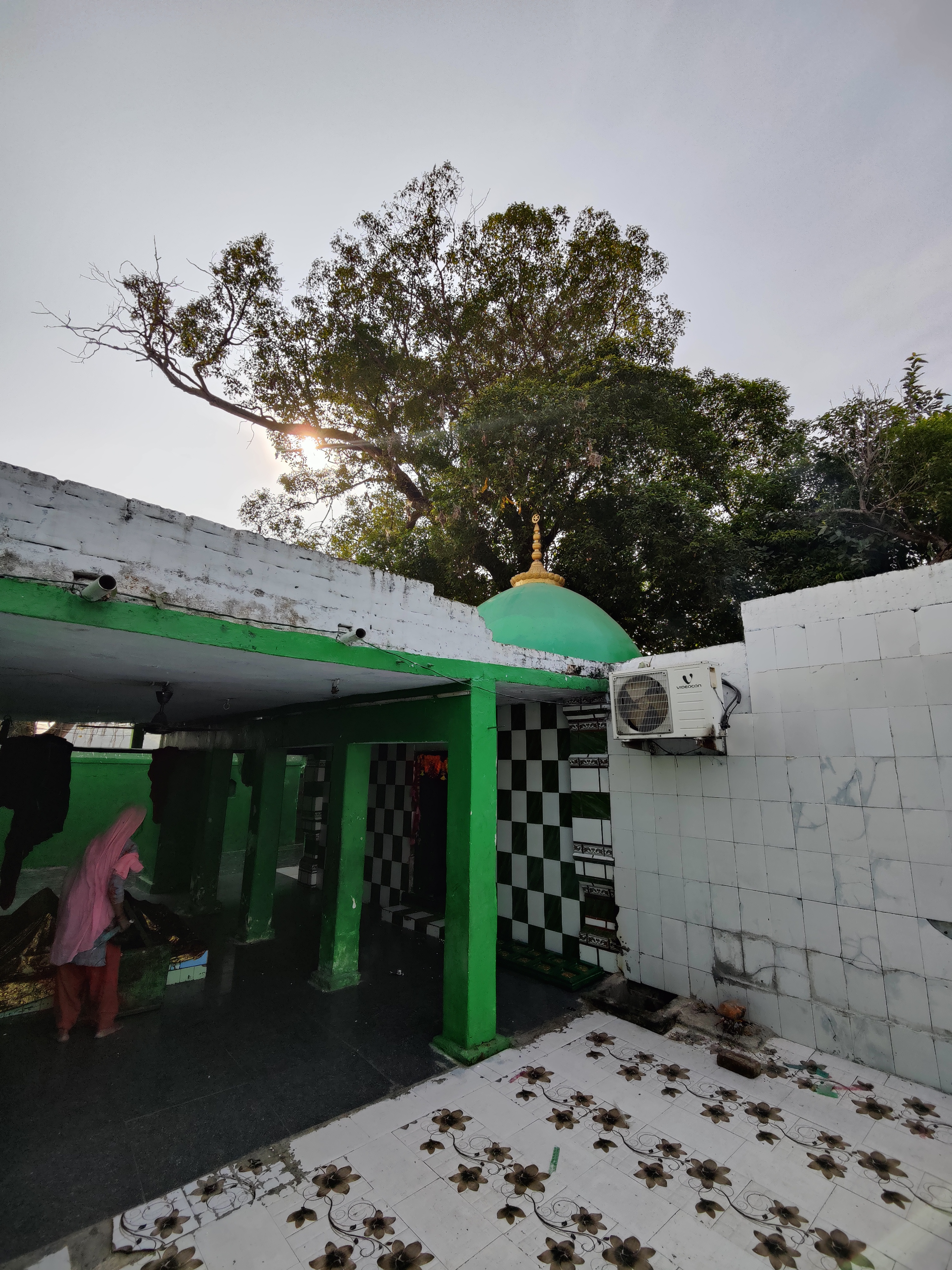
Dargah Bade Purush Baba Dikauli Sharif

Various sources described him being the uncle (Bade Walid or Taau) of Ghazi Saiyyad Salar Masud. He was the commander in the army of Ghazi Saiyyad Salar Masud. He died in the battle (1034 CE) before Salar Masud at Dikauli village, where his tomb is located at a distance of fifteen kilometres on the Bahraich - Bhinga road. A large number of Hindus and Muslims perform ziyarat at the mausoleum of Bade Purush.

== Fair and event ==
An annual fair is held throughout the month of Jeth at the shrine of Bade Purush. The place is visited by pilgrims from every corner of the country, including Gonda, Bihar, Siddharth Nagar, Basti, Gorakhpur, Ambedkar Nagar, Pratapgarh, Allahabad and neighbouring country Nepal. The pilgrims arrive performing music with Dhol Majira and worshipped with incense sticks, camphor, perfume and offered chadar and sinni.

According to the old tradition, before visiting the tomb of Ghazi Salar Masud of Bahraich, pilgrims pay obeisance at the shrine of Bade Purush.

== Accessibility ==
The Dargah is situated at a distance of about 22 km from the district headquarters of Shravasti. It is away 15 km from Bahraich.

== Other sources ==
Kumar Suresh Singh, in his survey book, People of India: Uttar Pradesh, Volume 3, published by Anthropological Survey of India, describes Bade Purukh as the spiritual guide of Ghazi Mian (Salar Masud).

== Photo gallery ==
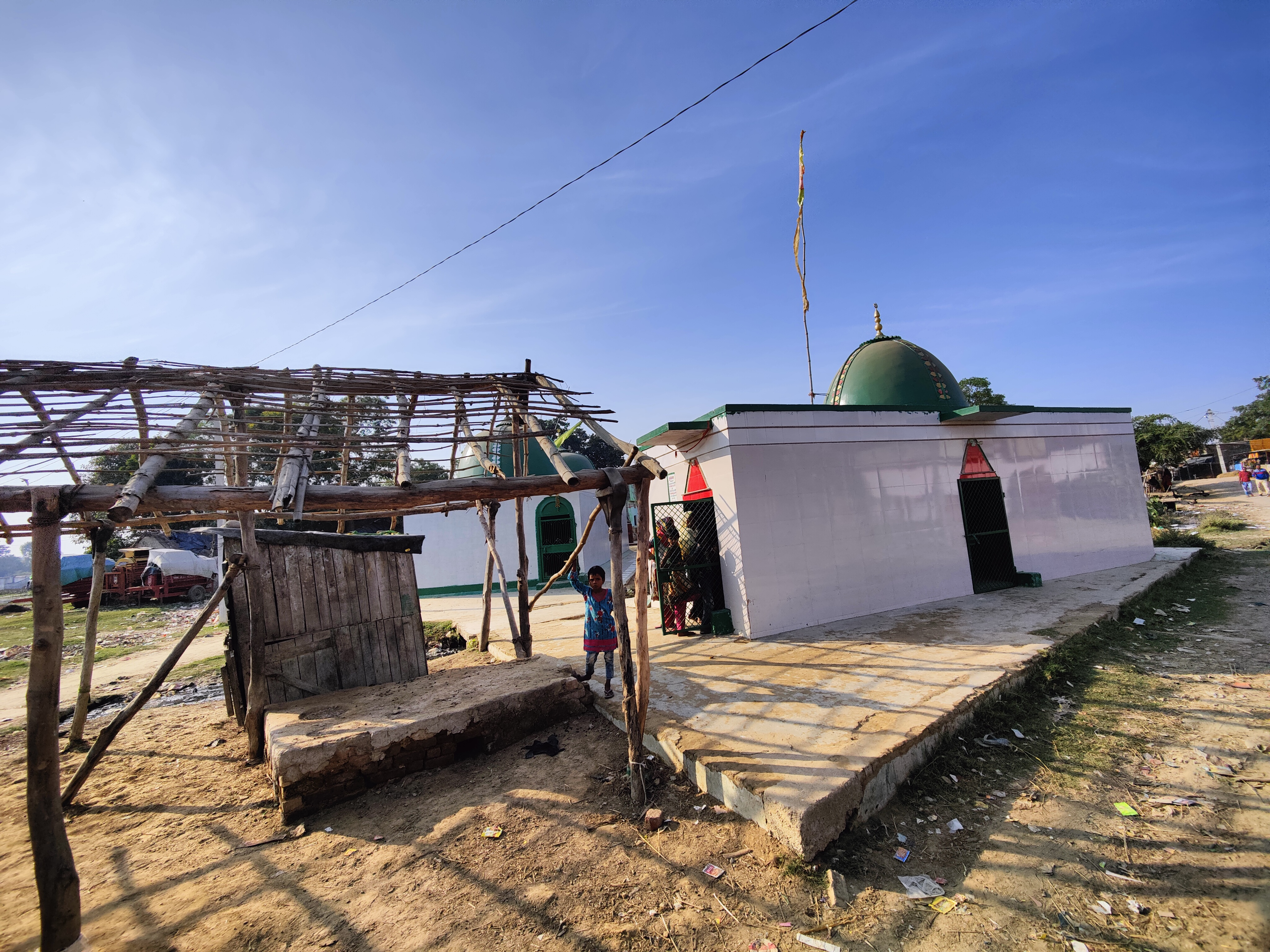
Dikauli village where Dargah Bade Purush located

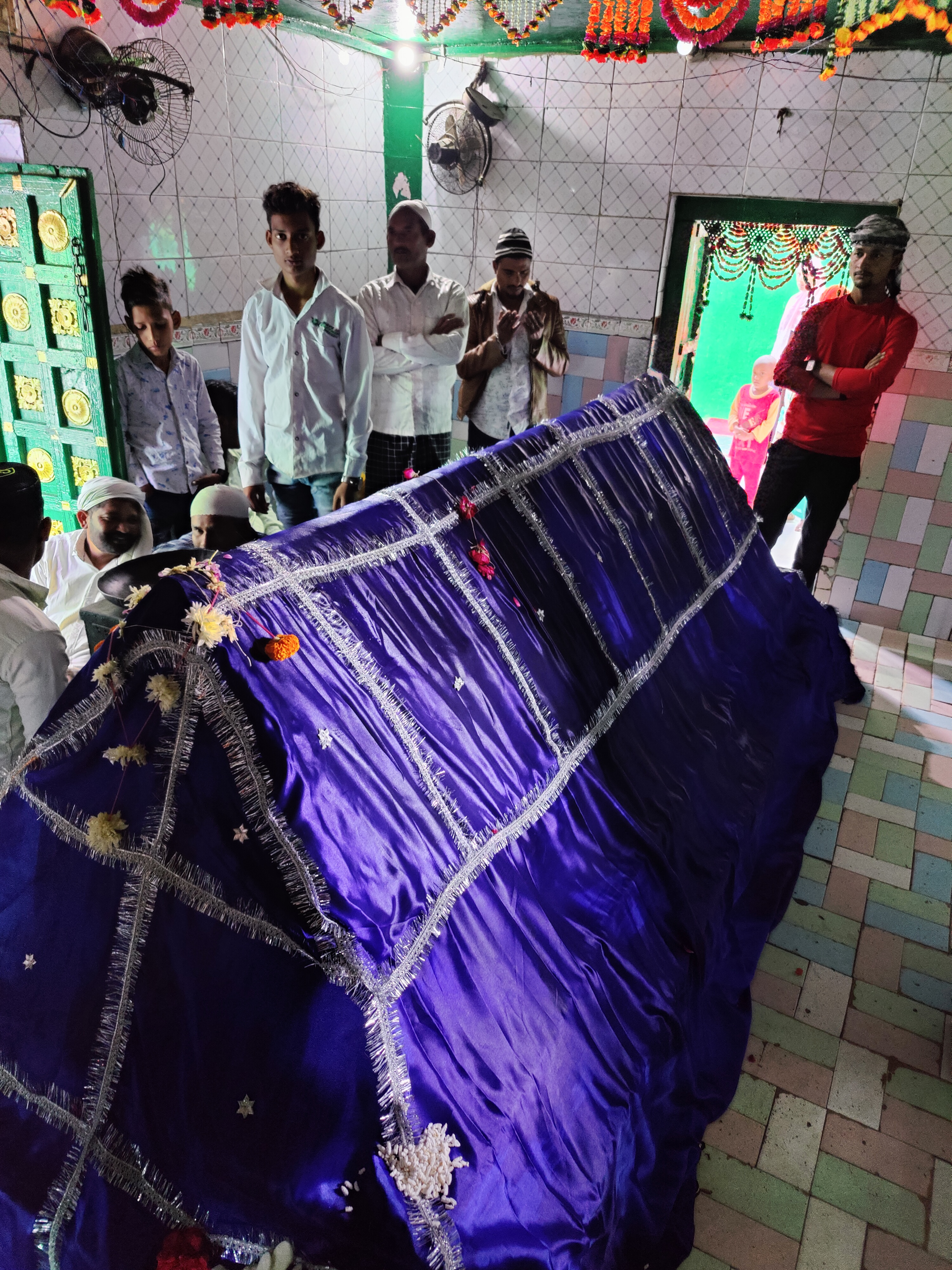
Tomb of Bade Purush

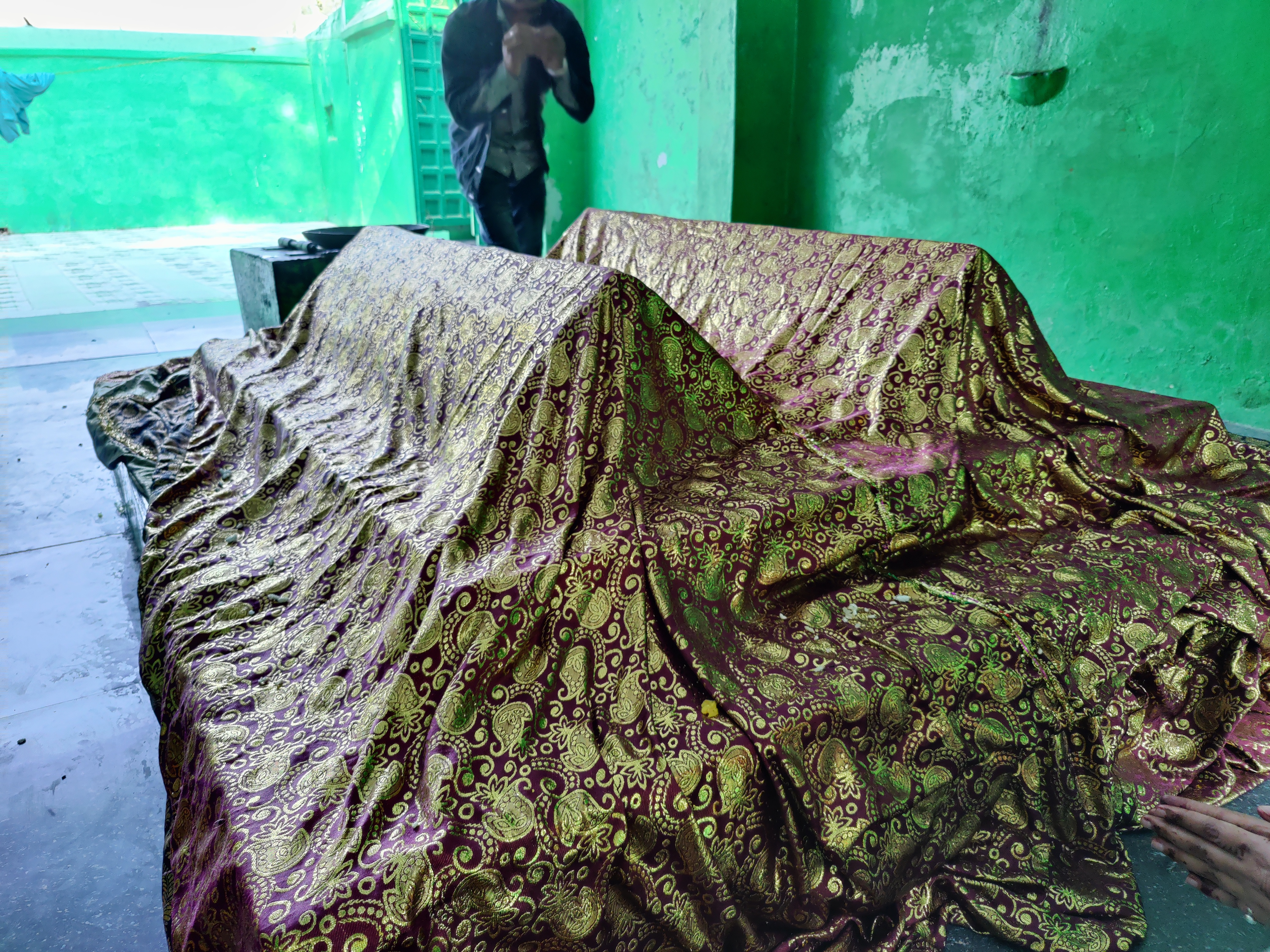
Tomb of Sati Amina adjoining the tomb of Bade Purush in the Dargah premises
