= The People of India =

Title that has been used for at least three books

The People of India is a title that has been used for at least three books, all of which focused primarily on ethnography.

== The People of India (1868–1875) ==
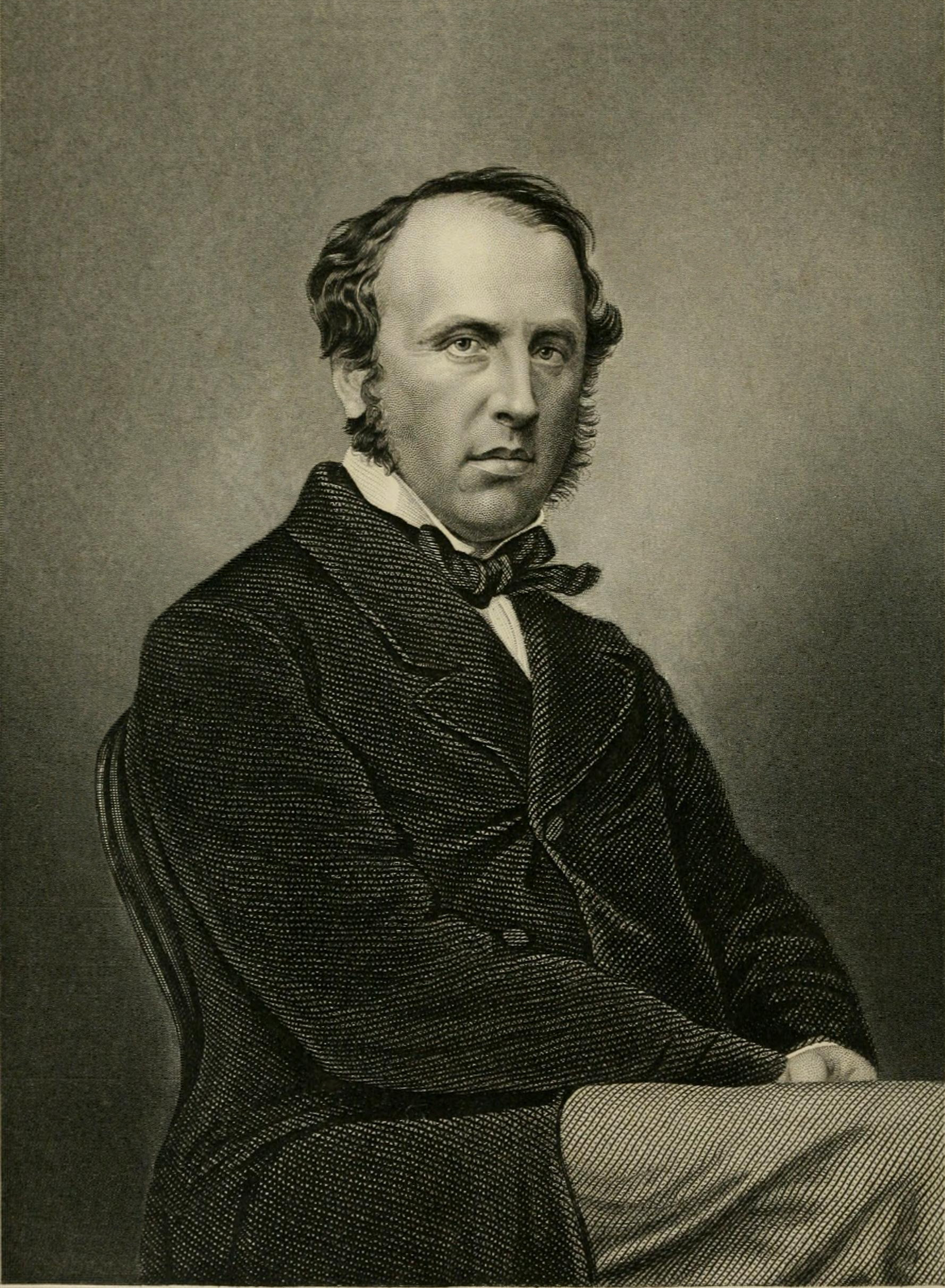
Lord Canning (1812–1862), Governor-General of India. He conceived a photographic study of native Indian people.

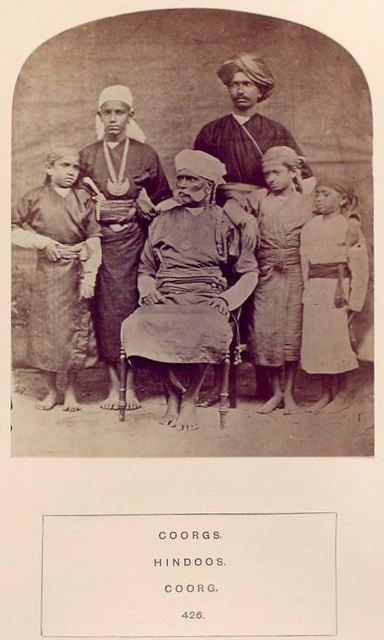
A plate from Watson and Kaye's The People of India, showing members of the Coorg community.

John Forbes Watson and John William Kaye compiled an eight-volume study entitled The People of India between 1868 and 1875. The books contained 468 annotated photographs of the native castes and tribes of India.

The origins of the project lay in the desire of Lord Canning to possess photographs of native Indian people. Photography was then a fairly new process and Canning, who was Governor-General of India, conceived of the collection of images for the private edification of himself and his wife. However, the Indian Rebellion of 1857 caused a shift in mindset of the London-based British government, which saw that events had come close to overturning British influence in the country and countered this by placing India under more direct control than had been the case when it relied on the capabilities of the British East India Company to perform such functions. This was the beginning of the British Raj period.

G. G. Raheja has remarked that "the colonial imagination had seized upon caste identities as a means of understanding and controlling the Indian population after the blow to administrative complacency occasioned in 1857." Initial attempts at ethnographic study by the British in India had concentrated on the issues of female infanticide and sati (widow immolation), which were thought to be prevalent in the northern and western areas of the country – especially among the Rajputs – and which the colonial rulers wished to eradicate by a process of social engineering. Following the rebellion, officers then serving in the Indian Civil Service, such as Richard Carnac Temple, were of the opinion that if future unrest was to be avoided then it was necessary to obtain a better understanding of the colonial subjects and in particular those from the rural areas. Early efforts in the sphere of British ethnography in India were concentrated on obtaining an understanding of Indian folk-lore, but another early consequence was that The People of India became an official British government publication.

The photographs compiled by Watson and Kaye were not the first to be taken of Indian people but the project was organised within the framework of attempts by officials to document the people in a methodical, statistically and ethnographically oriented manner, later expressed by Denzil Ibbetson in his 1883 report on the 1881 census of the Punjab,

Our ignorance of the customs and beliefs of the people among whom we dwell is surely in some respects a reproach to us; for not only does that ignorance deprive European science of material which it greatly needs, but it also involves a distinct loss of administrative power to ourselves".

The collection was an attempt at a visual documentation of "typical" physical attributes, dress and other aspects of native life that would complement written studies, although it did itself contain brief notes regarding what were thought to be the "essential characteristics" of each community. Thomas Metcalf has said that, "Accurate information about India's peoples now mattered as never before ... [although imperfect] for the most part the work marked out a stage in the transformation of ethnological curiosity ..." Educated Indians were unimpressed with the outcome and with the general undertone that their people had been depicted both unfairly and dispassionately.

Sadhana Naithani has noted that almost all of the British in India at that time

related to the society around [them] through three conduits: first, through other English officers and institutions; second, through office clerks, peons, and domestic servants; and third, through the recourse of the intellectual – anthropological and orientalist literature.

== The People of India (1908) ==
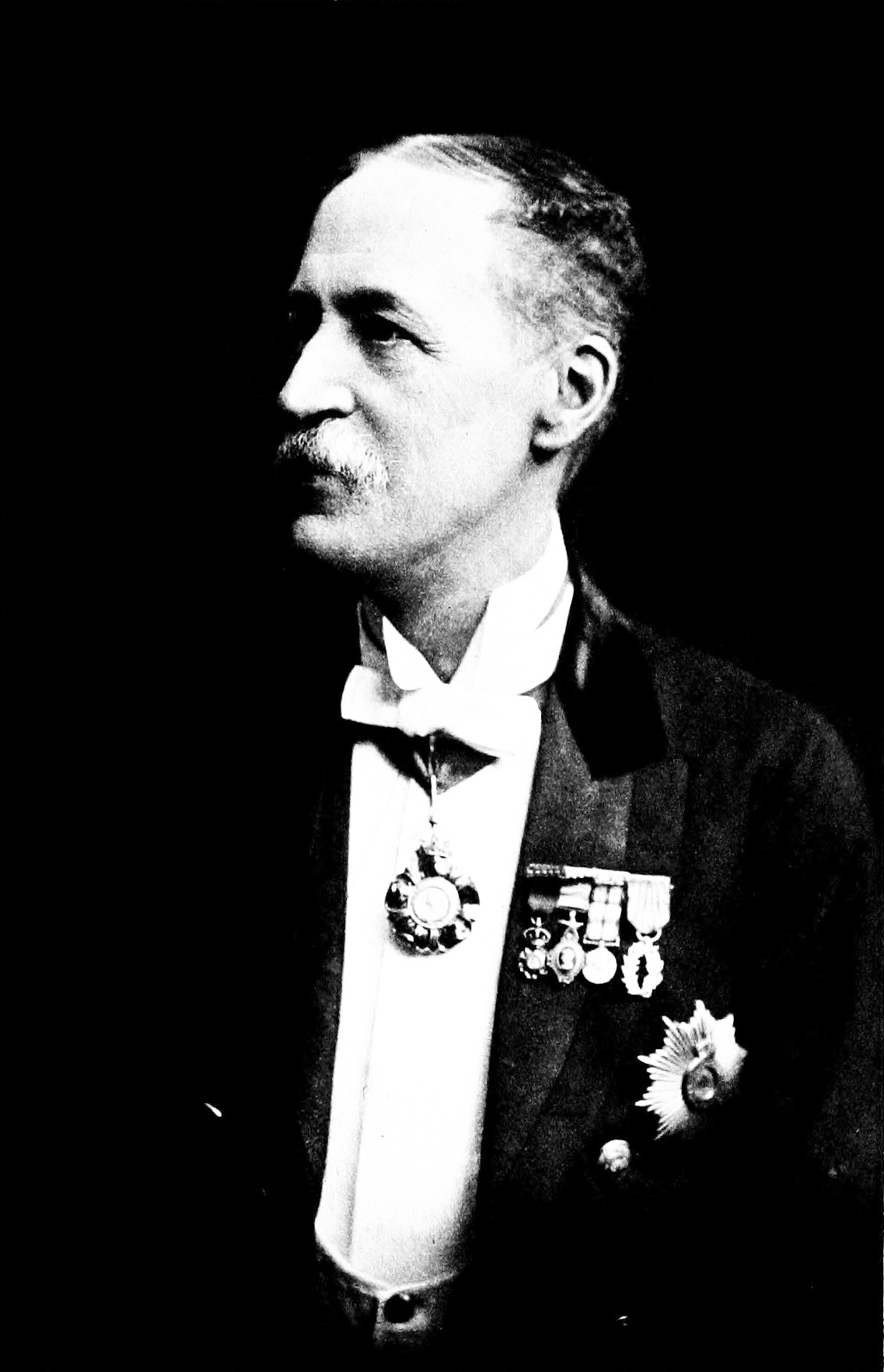
H. H. Risley (1851–1911)

As time passed after the 1857 rebellion, British ethnographic studies and their resultant categorisations were embodied in numerous official publications and became an essential part of the British administrative mechanism, and of those categorisations it was caste that was regarded to be, in the words of Herbert Hope Risley, "the cement that holds together the myriad units of Indian society". Risley, who was an English administrator in the Indian Civil Service, also saw India as an ethnological laboratory, where the continued practice of endogamy had ensured that, in his opinion, there were strict delineations of the various communities by caste and that consequently caste could be viewed as identical to race. Whereas others saw caste as being based on occupation, he believed that changes in occupation within a community led to another instance of endogamy "being held by a sort of unconscious fiction to be equivalent to the difference of race, which is the true basis of the system."

In 1908 Risley published his book, The People of India. By this stage in his career he had been, among other roles, Census Commissioner for the 1901 Census of India, and he had for many years been a keen ethnographer and proponent of the anthropometric theories of Paul Topinard. Although Risley had acknowledged the earlier book of Watson and Kaye as being "famous in its day", he did not refer to it in his 1908 work. Risley had produced earlier works, including the four-volume The Tribes and Castes of Bengal, and continued his ethnographic writings and studies until his death in 1911.

The 25 illustrations contained in the book were lithographic prints – based largely on the photographs of Benjamin Simpson – that had been used to illustrate Edward Tuite Dalton's 1875 book, Descriptive Ethnology of Bengal. This meant that the illustrations were predominantly of hill tribes from one area of the country rather than the broad range that had been shown by Walton and Kaye.

The thoughts of Émile Senart are quoted extensively, although at the time of Risley's writing they were not available in English translation. The academic position of Risley himself has been described by Susan Bayly

Those like [Sir William] Hunter, as well as the key figures of H. H. Risley (1851–1911) and his protégé Edgar Thurston, who were disciples of the French race theorist Topinard and his European followers, subsumed discussions of caste into theories of biologically determined race essences, ... Their great rivals were the material or occupational theorists led by the ethnographer and folklorist William Crooke (1848–1923), author of one of the most widely read provincial Castes and Tribes surveys, and such other influential scholar-officials as Denzil Ibbetson and E. A. H. Blunt.

A memorial edition of The People of India was produced in 1915, edited by William Crooke, who had also served in the Indian Civil Service and was interested in anthropology. It contained an additional 11 illustrations and an ethnological map of the country.

Risley's career and works have been interpreted as "the apotheosis of pseudo-scientific racism", which was a theory prevalent for a century from around the 1840s that "race was one of the principal determinants of attitudes, endowments, capabilities and inherent tendencies among human beings. Race thus seemed to determine the course of human history." D. F. Pocock describes The People of India as

... almost the last production of that great tradition of administrator scholars who had long and extensive experience in the Indian Civil Service and had not found their arduous activity incompatible with scholarship.

The last such work, according to Pocock, was J. H. Hutton's Caste in India, published in 1944.

== The People of India (1992–2008) ==
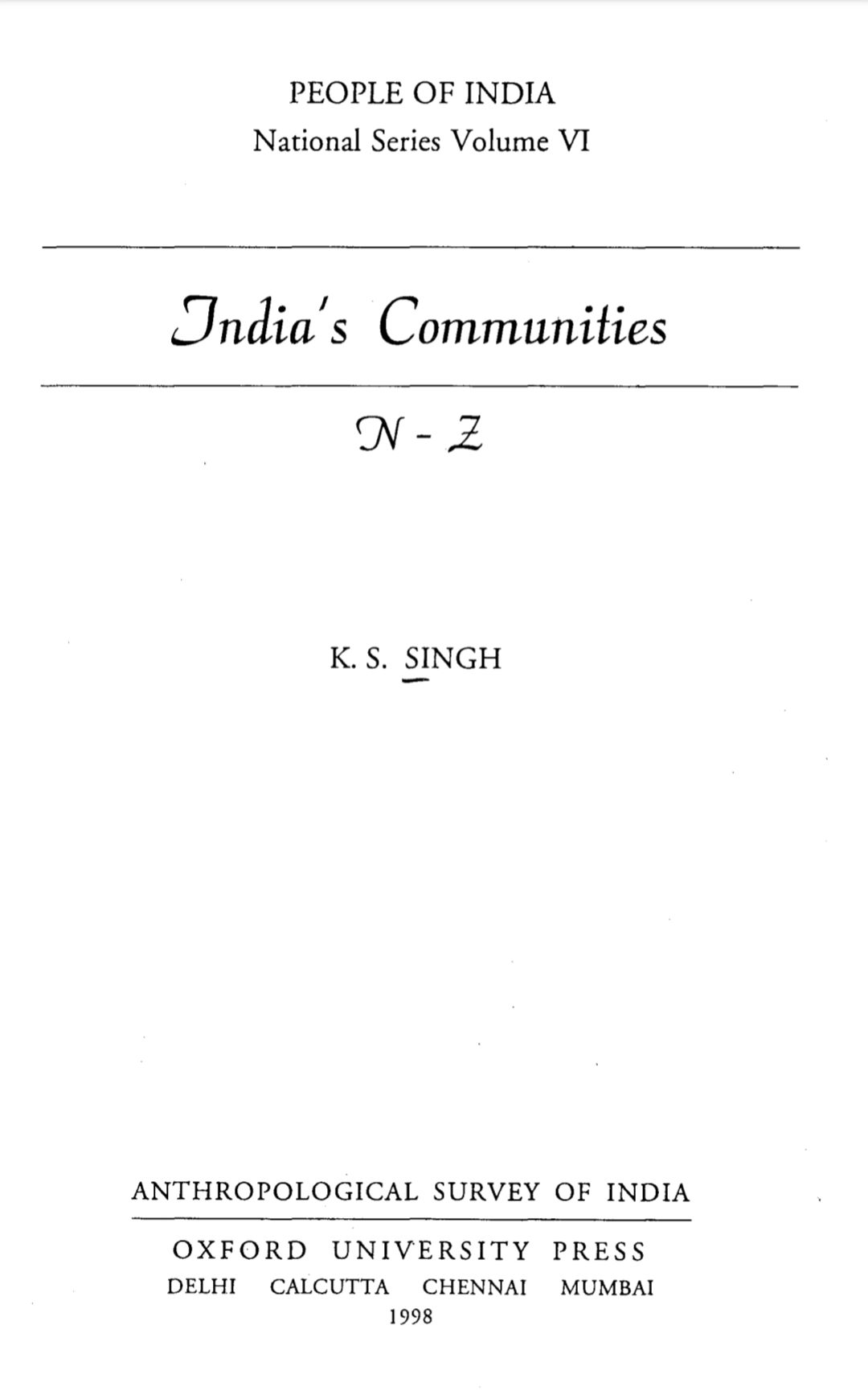
Cover page of The People of India (national series)

The multi-volume series of books, published from 1992 under the auspices of the government-run Anthropological Survey of India (AnSI), adopted the same title as the colonial works of 1868–1875 and 1908. The project was more detailed than the official ethnological surveys of the British Raj, which had a policy of ignoring communities of less than 2000 people and which laid much emphasis on anthropometry. The AnSI adopted a cut-off point of 200 members and preferred blood groups to be "the crucial indicator of physical difference".

Kumar Suresh Singh, a tribal historian and officer in the Indian Administrative Service who held posts including that of Director-General of the AnSI, had responsibility for the organisation, compilation and oversight of the survey and publications. The intent was to produce an anthropological study of the differences and linkages between all of the communities in India. The survey involved 470 scholars and identified 4694 communities during its period of fieldwork between October 1985 and 1994. Sinha notes a total of 3000 scholars, which figure appears to include those involved at various seminars and workshops. The full results of the survey comprises 43 published volumes, of which 12 had been produced at the time of Singh's death.

The volumes were produced as two collections, with the first eleven comprising the National series and the remainder being known as the State series.

Laura Jenkins has noted that the project has been undertaken

Despite the tainted past of such ethnographies. ... According to its initial circular, "[t]his will be a project on the People of India by the people of India," a phrase ringing with nationalism, yet the goal of this national project is to generate a profile of each community in India, largely defined in terms of caste. Purportedly a work of apolitical anthropology, this endeavor is nevertheless sponsored by the state. ... Although castes are a major unit of analysis for the People of India projects, both past and present, the latest project superimposes the new theme of national unity, a politically useful focus for an ethnography sponsored by the central government of India. ... Although such a study might be used to undermine caste distinctions by providing data to refine reservation policies, the People of India project's conclusions have often been used simply to undermine the policies. The People of India projects, colonial and postcolonial, and the varied identity claims made about them, in them, and through them demonstrate the intertwined nature of social identities and state identifications.

The books use colonial ethnographies extensively and note, for example, that

... in spite of the investigators' best efforts to incorporate firsthand information from the field, by direct investigation, it was not possible to do so with the limited personnel resources made available for such a voluminous project. Nevertheless adequate care has been taken to update the ethnographic details of most of the communities, where published material existed. It was also not possible to incorporate all of the unpublished data ... available with various Anthropology/Sociology departments in the country (despite express instructions to do so under the project, only a few were incorporated)

The volumes consist of

=== National series ===
1. Introduction
2. Scheduled Castes
3. Scheduled Tribes
4. India's communities : A-G
5. India's communities : H-M
6. India's communities : N-Z
7. Identity, ecology, social organisation, economy, development process and linkages : A qualitative profile
8. Communities, segments, surnames & titles
9. Languages & scripts
10. The biological variation in Indian population
11. An anthropological atlas

=== State series ===
12. Andaman & Nicobar Islands

13. Andhra Pradesh (in 3 parts)

14. Arunachal Pradesh

15. Assam (in 2 parts)

16. Bihar including Jharkhand (in 2 parts)

17. Chandigarh

18. Dadra & Nagar Haveli

19. Daman & Diu

20. Delhi

21. Goa

22. Gujarat (in 3 parts)

23. Haryana

24. Himachal Pradesh

25. Jammu & Kashmir

26. Karnataka (in 3 parts)

27. Kerala (in 3 parts)

28. Lakshadweep

29. Sikkim

30. Maharashtra (in 3 parts)

31. Manipur

32. Meghalaya

33. Mizoram

34. Nagaland

35. Orissa (in 2 parts)

36. Pondicherry

37. Punjab

38. Rajasthan (in 2 parts)

39. Sikkim (updated version)

40. Tamil Nadu (in 3 parts)

41. Tripura

42. Uttar Pradesh (in 3 parts)

43. West Bengal (in 2 parts)

The entire series was initially published in association with Oxford University Press & Seagull Books & later by Popular Prakashan Pvt. Ltd.

== See also ==
- Scientific racism
