= Robert Vane Russell =

British civil servant and ethnographer (1873–1915)

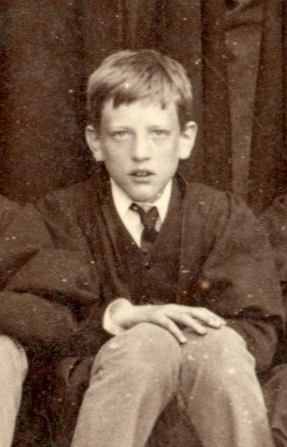
- Robert Vane Russell at school
- Born: 8 August 1873
- Died: 30 December 1915 (aged 42)
- Education: Trinity College, Cambridge; Winchester College
- Known for: Ethnography and Census Operations of British India
- Father: Charles Robert Tilden Russell

Robert Vane Russell (8 August 1873 – 30 December 1915) was a British civil servant, known for his role as Superintendent of Ethnography for what was then the Central Provinces of British India, coordinating the production of publications detailing the peoples of the region. Russell served as Superintendent of Census Operations for the 1901 Census of India.

Russell's father, Charles Robert Tilden Russell, was an officer in the Royal Navy. He was educated at Winchester College before attending Trinity College, Cambridge and then, in 1893, joining the Indian Civil Service.

Together with an amateur archaeologist, Rai Bahadur Hira Lal, Russell compiled The Castes and Tribes of the Central Provinces, published in 1916. This work was a product of the Ethnographic Survey of India that had been established in 1901, although it differed somewhat from earlier publications of similar origin because it relied more on Vedic literature than on the anthropometric methods and theories of Herbert Hope Risley and his sympathisers as a mechanism for investigation of the racial origins of caste. According to Crispin Bates, this "highly anecdotal book" was influenced by Émile Senart's Les Castes dans L'Inde and

From this source Russell and Hira Lal reasoned that the tribals could probably be identified as the Rakshasas (or devils) described in the Mahabharata, and were therefore an entirely distinct community, the Brahmins, Kshatriyas and Vaishyas were Aryan invaders, and the Sudras were the original inhabitants of South Asia, reduced by them to a subordinate role. Thus although occupational descriptions were used, particularly in distinguishing the different ranks of Aryans, the hierarchy remained extreme (and definitively racial) in a form that was still probably unrecognisable to most participants in the social system itself at this time. In this way, although Risley's anthropometry had become unfashionable his views persisted.

Russell died when the SS Persia was torpedoed and sank off the coast of Crete on 30 December 1915.

== Works ==
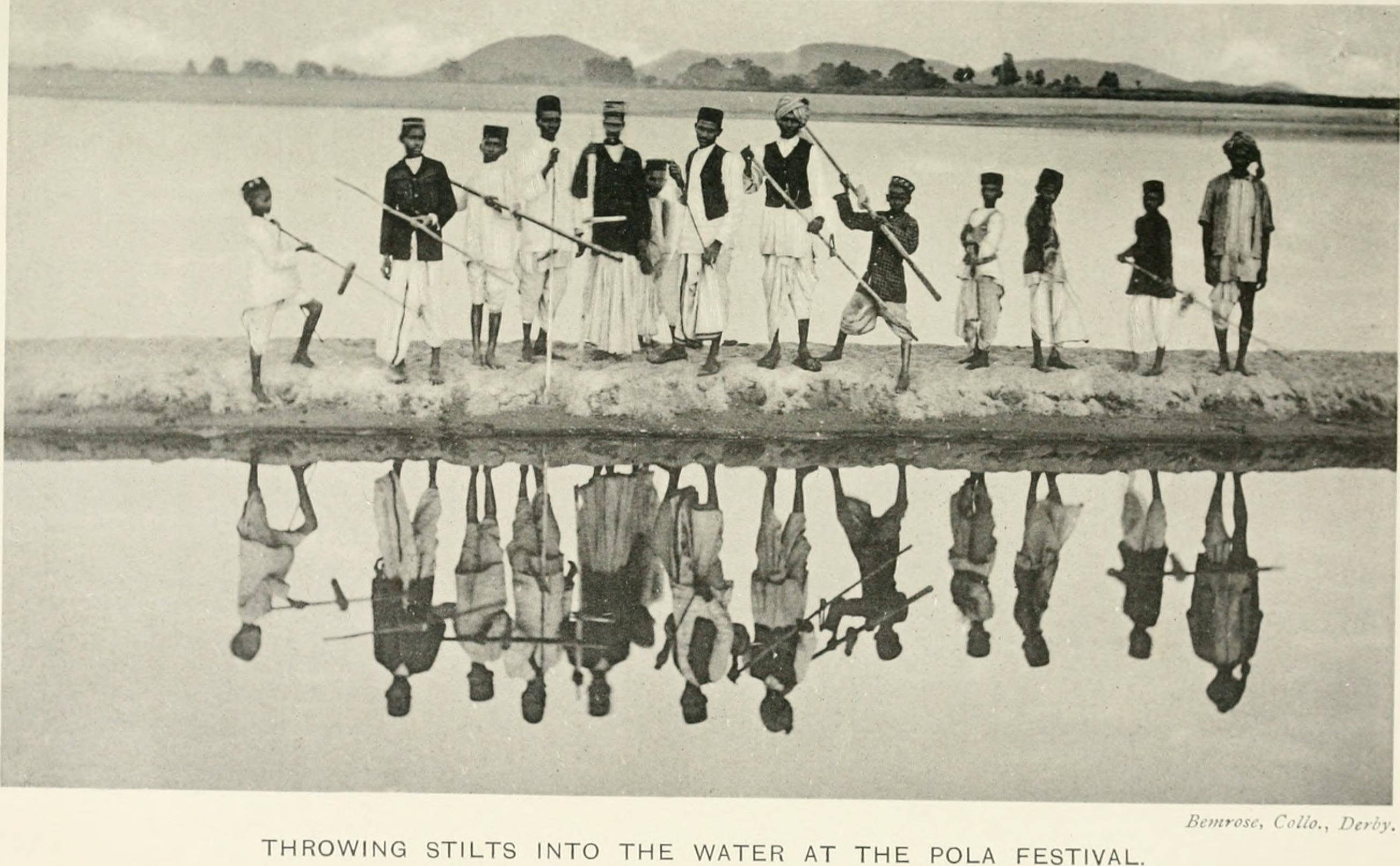
Kunbi people throwing stilts into the water at the Pola festival as depicted in Tribes and Castes of the Central Provinces of India

- Russell, Robert Vane (1916). Tribes and Castes of the Central Provinces of India. Vol. 1. Lal, Rai Bahadur Hira. London: Macmillan & Co.
- Russell, Robert Vane (1916). Tribes and Castes of the Central Provinces of India. Vol. 2. Lal, Rai Bahadur Hira. London: Macmillan & Co.
- Russell, Robert Vane (1916). Tribes and Castes of the Central Provinces of India. Vol. 3. Lal, Rai Bahadur Hira. London: Macmillan & Co.
- Russell, Robert Vane (1916). Tribes and Castes of the Central Provinces of India. Vol. 4. Lal, Rai Bahadur Hira. London: Macmillan & Co.
