= Ram Gharib Chaube =

Ram Gharib Chaube was an Indian scholar who assisted William Crooke in various ethnographic researches during the period of the British Raj.

Chaube was from the eastern North-Western Provinces and an intelligent scholar with a BA from Presidency College in Calcutta. His first collaboration with William Crooke appears to have been in 1892 when he provided information for North Indian Notes and Queries. Crooke had recently taken control of that journal from Richard Carnac Temple and had renamed it from the original title of Punjab Notes and Queries. Although intended for the British audience in India, as were numerous other such publications of the time, it was Indians who provided almost all of the content for the revised Notes and Queries format that Sadhana Naithani believes demonstrates "the emergence and growth of that brand of ethnography for which Crooke should be better known and in which he differs from most other colonial ethnographers." The defining feature of the journal, which was based heavily on folklore, was that it considered its subjects in the context of the popular culture of the present day rather than dwelling on the past.

Chaube became much involved in Notes and Queries and proved himself to be a methodical collector, collator and translator whose specialism was local custom that was not recorded in Sanskrit works. He subsequently claimed to have assisted with much information in Crooke's Popular Religion and Folklore, which was first published in 1894, quickly sold out and was then re-issued as a two-volume revised and illustrated edition in 1896. Chaube resented that his input was not acknowledged by Crooke. His contribution to Tribes and Castes of the North Western Provinces, published in 1896, was only briefly acknowledged in two footnotes. The relative contributions to the latter have been described by Chandrashekhar Shukl: "While Chaube was going places collecting information, Crooke used to sometimes delve into collecting tit bits." Crooke did, however, pay Chaube well and, although he was himself an employee of the Raj, he did so from his own pocket.

Sandra B. Freitag sees the relationship between Crooke and Chaube as "... a key example of the inter-related processes by which British decisions over what to emphasise [in their amateur studies of social science] were given their substance by the social preoccupations and prejudices of their indigenous informants". She notes this as an opinion shared by Shahid Amin, who had voiced it in his introduction to the Oxford University Press reprint of Crooke's A Glossary of North Indian Peasant Life, published in 1989. However, Christopher Bayly interprets the views of Amin differently, believing him to be saying that informants such as Chaube "... were simply providers of fact; they did not really influence the form of colonial knowledge."

Chaube went on to work as an employee of the Linguistic Survey of India between September 1898 and August 1900. That survey was headed by George Abraham Grierson, who had been a contemporary and friend of Crooke when they were students at Trinity College, Dublin. (Note: Shahid Amin notes that Crooke and Grierson both joined the Indian Civil Service in 1871 and that "Crooke and Grierson were [respectively] Collector-ethnologist and Collector-linguist par excellence of the Ganga valley".)

== Works ==
=== Bhojpuri ===
- Jangal me Mangal
- Nagari Vilaap
