= Kumar Suresh Singh =

Director-General of Anthropological Survey of India

- Born: 15 March 1935; Munger, Bihar Province, British India
- Died: May 20, 2006 (aged 71)
- Education: M.A (History), PhD
- Alma mater: Patna University
- Occupations: Civil Servant, Anthropologist
- Known for: The People of India
- Spouse: Bimleshwari Singh (m. 1959)

Kumar Suresh Singh (1935–2006) commonly known as K. S. Singh, was an Indian Administrative Service officer, who served as a Commissioner of Chhotanagpur (1978–80) and Director-General of the Anthropological Survey of India. He is known principally for his oversight and editorship of the People of India survey and for his studies of tribal history.

== Life ==
Kumar Suresh Singh came from a privileged background, growing up in Munger, Bihar. He studied history, gaining a first-class BA from Patna University. He subsequently obtained a master's degree, and finally a PhD on the subject of the revolutionary, Birsa Munda.

He joined the Indian Administrative Service (IAS) in 1958. He worked among the Mundas and then spent the period 1965–1968 as Deputy Commissioner at Palamu, in the Chhotanagpur area. This posting coincided with the Bihar famine, for which he helped to organise relief and which introduced some innovative approaches that have subsequently been adopted elsewhere.

His posts in the government of Bihar included being Secretary in various departments: Industries (1973–1974), Rural Development (1974–1975, and 1980–1981), and Forest and Environment (1982–1984). A. K. Sinha has noted that "Because of his honesty, integrity and adherence to the norms of administration, he was not allowed to complete his term in any department in Bihar."

In between these various government posts, Singh returned to Chhotanagpur as Commissioner for the period 1978–1980. In 1984 he was appointed Director-General of the Anthropological Survey of India (ASI) and also Director of the Indira Gandhi Rashtriya Manav Sangrahalaya (National Museum of Mankind) in Bhopal.

Although Singh retired from the ASI in 1993, he remained General Editor of the People of India series until his death on 20 May 2006. He completed the final volume just before dying, having previously suffering partial paralysis from a stroke. He was a National Fellow of the Indian Council of Historical Research at the time of his death. Muchkund Dubey subsequently commented that

Kumar Suresh was a kind of a rare person among Indian civil servants. He was of a scholarly bent of mind right from his university days. He had a deep knowledge of a number of disciplines. His monumental contribution People of India will remain as a kind of tribute to his multifaceted talents. His empathy for and commitment to the weaker sections of society will always be remembered. He was one of the three intellectual fathers in the creation of Jharkhand.

== Tribal studies ==
Singh wrote a PhD thesis on Birsa Munda, the leader of an insurgency campaign against British rule. To do this he had to rely significantly on folk-lore and other forms of oral history practised by the tribal inhabitants of the Jharkhand area of Bihar, where in total he spent 15 years conducting fieldwork. Although Singh considered Damodar Dharmananda Kosambi to be the first mainstream subaltern historian, Sinha notes that Singh himself may have been. He went on to produce other works on tribal history.

== People of India ==
Singh had responsibility for the organisation, compilation and oversight of the People of India survey, which was intended to be an anthropological study of the differences and linkages between all of the communities in India.The survey involved 470 scholars and identified 4694 communities during its period of fieldwork between October 1985 and 1994. Sinha notes a total of 3000 scholars, which figure appears to include those involved at various seminars and workshops. The full results of the survey fill 43 published volumes, of which 12 had been produced at the time of Singh's death.

The purpose and methodology of the survey has received criticism. Laura Dudley Jenkins, for example, has said that

According to its initial circular, "[t]his will be a project on the People of India by the people of India," a phrase ringing with nationalism, yet the goal of this national project is to generate a profile of each community in India, largely defined in terms of caste. Purportedly a work of apolitical anthropology, this endeavor is nevertheless sponsored by the state and uses the administrative categories of Scheduled Castes (SCs) and Scheduled Tribes (STs). Due to India's reservation policies, which reserve quotas of government jobs, parliamentary seats, and university admissions for these disadvantaged groups, controversy rages over their boundaries, numbers, and social conditions. Although castes are a major unit of analysis ... the latest project superimposes the new theme of national unity, a politically useful focus for an ethnography sponsored by the central government of India.

—

A review of the first volume of the series over Contributions to Indian Sociology, noted:-

The author claims that the present volumes are far superior to the ethnographic descriptions of different castes done during the colonial period; but the first volume is itself reminiscent of Risley’s and Hutton’s writings on castes in the early part of this century.

— Bidyut Mohanty,

Another opinion favourably contrasts the project with colonial ethnography, with Sinha saying that

The colonial studies were fragmentary and micro-level; many scholars studied castes, tribes, and village communities within an atomistic framework and followed a quantitative and uncritical methodology. Unlike them, this project was supposed to prepare brief, descriptive anthropological profiles of all communities in India, with special attention to the impact of change and development on them, highlighting the linkages that bring them together.

== Publications ==
Aside from his writing, as author and as editor, in volumes related to the People of India survey, Singh also wrote and edited other works, a selection of which are:

- Singh, Kumar Suresh (1966). The Dust-Storm and the Hanging Mist: A Study of Birsa Munda and his Movement in Chhotanagpur, 1874–1901. Calcutta: Firma K. L. Mukhopadhyay. – published version of Singh's PhD dissertation
- Singh, Kumar Suresh (1975). The Indian Famine, 1967: A Study in Crisis and Change. New Delhi: People's Publishing House.
- Singh, Kumar Suresh, ed. (1982). Tribal Movements in India. Vol. 1. New Delhi: Manohar. ISBN 978-0-8364-1027-3.
- Singh, Kumar Suresh (1983). Birsa Munda and his Movement, 1872–1901: A study of a Millenarian Movement in Chotanagpur. Calcutta & London: Oxford University Press. ISBN 978-81-7046-205-7.
- Singh, Kumar Suresh (1985). Tribal Society in India: An Anthropo-historical Perspective. New Delhi: Manohar. ISBN 978-81-85054-05-6.
- Kalla, Aloke Kumar; Singh, Kumar Suresh (1987). Anthropology, Development, and Nation Building. New Delhi: Concept Publishing Company. ISBN 9788170220015.
- Singh, Kumar Suresh, ed. (1993). Tribal Ethnography, Customary Law, and Change. New Delhi: Concept Publishing Company. ISBN 978-81-7022-471-6.
- Singh, Kumar Suresh, ed. (1998). Antiquity to Modernity in Tribal India: Tribal Movements in India. New Delhi: Inter-India Publications. ISBN 978-81-210-0385-8.
- Singh, Kumar Suresh, ed. (2002). The Tribal Situation in India. Simla: Indian Institute of Advanced Study. ISBN 978-81-7986-008-3.

== See also ==
- William Crooke
- Herbert Hope Risley
