= The Tribes and Castes of Bengal =

1891 book Herbert Hope Risley

The Tribes and Castes of Bengal is a book written by Herbert Hope Risley in 1891. There were four volumes, some of which have been digitized by Google, which are available from the Harvard Library.
