= Paul Topinard =

French physician and anthropologist (1830–1911)

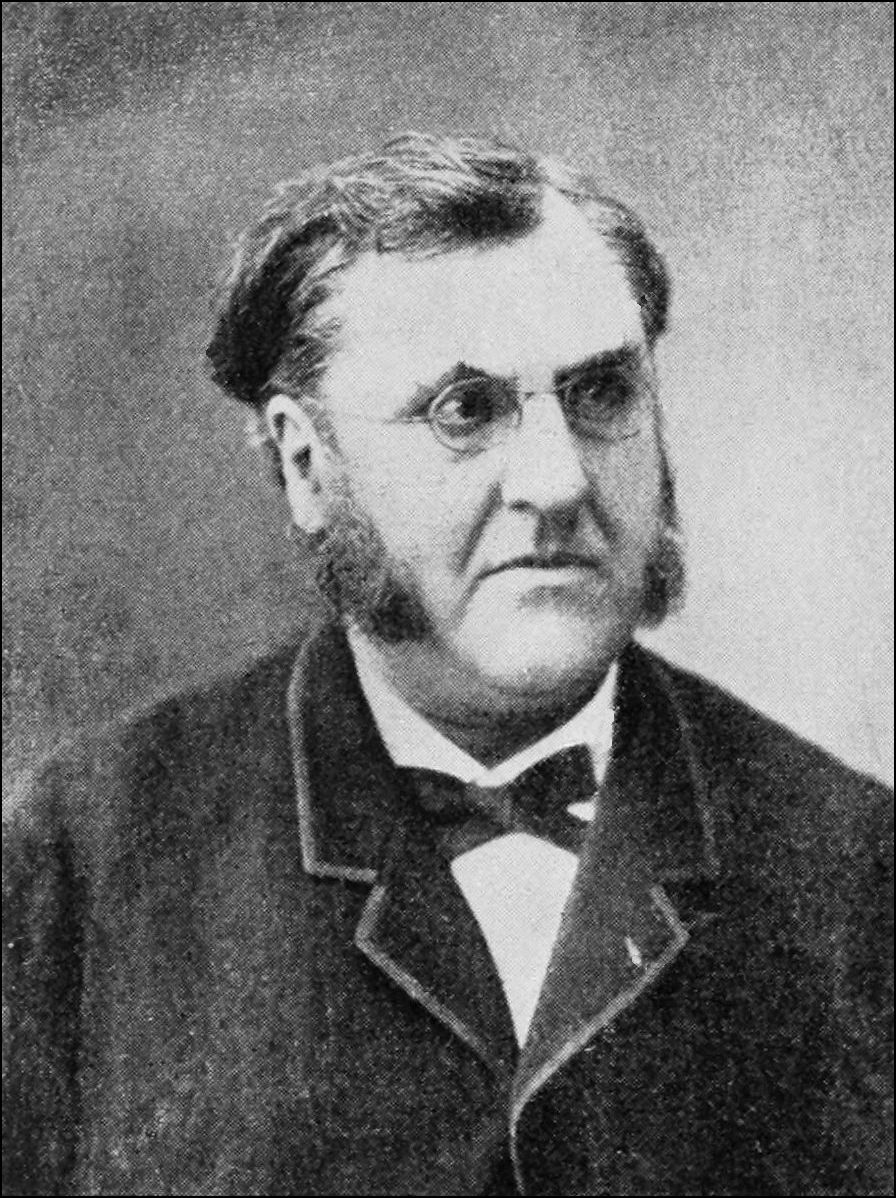
Paul Topinard

Paul Topinard (4 November 1830, L'Isle-Adam Parmain, Val-d'Oise – 20 December 1911, 6th arrondissement of Paris) was a French physician and anthropologist who was a student of Paul Broca and whose views influenced the methodology adopted by Herbert Hope Risley in his ethnographic surveys of the people of India. He became director of the École d'Anthropologie and secretary-general of the Société d'Anthropologie de Paris, both in succession to Broca. He was elected as a member to the American Philosophical Society in 1886.

== Biography ==
Paul Topinard's specialization was physical anthropology. His opinions were polygenist but he was less rigid than Broca. He nonetheless frequently referred to Broca as his "master", and according to John Carson was "committed to the superiority of white male Europeans". Patrick Brantlinger says that

... the spell of craniology, phrenology, physiognomy, and other attempts to quantify racial inequalities by physical measurement hovers over ...the ethnological and anthropological debates of the mid- and late-Victorian eras. These attempts expressed a materialist determinism, strongly associated with scientific explanation, that underscored the inevitability of the extinction or extermination of the "lower races" by the "higher" ones in "the struggle for existence".

In a manner similar to Samuel George Morton, the anthropologist of the United States, Topinard conducted experiments intended to test theories that cranial capacity was a marker of ethnicity, with European capacities being the largest and Australian Aborigines the smallest. He calculated the capacity of various skulls by pouring substances into them and then noting the volume consumed, on the assumption that a larger space for a brain equated to a more developed intellect. He also believed that such measurements could be tracked through the evolution of the human species and that a larger cranial capacity was therefore related to a greater degree of civilisation. Charles Loring Brace has recently studied skulls used originally by Topinard in his experiments and believes that there is a fundamental flaw in the theory because the Congolese and West African examples represented people who were physically much smaller overall.

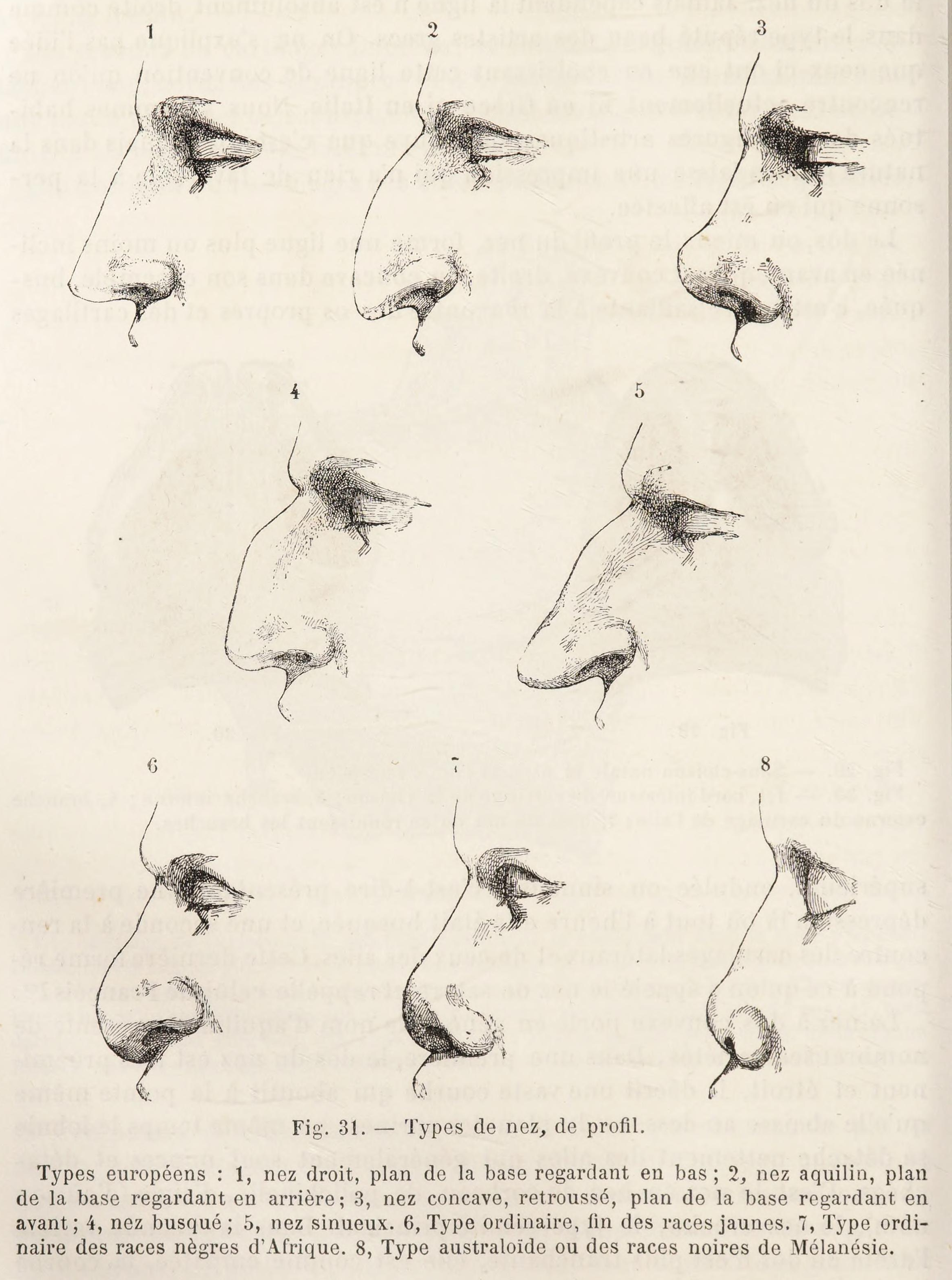
The nasal index: a method of classifying ethnicity based on the ratio of the breadth of a nose to its height, Developed by Topinard. "Narrow" noses (Types 1–5) indicate European origin; "medium" noses (Type 6) are the "yellow races"; and "broad" are either African (Type 7) or Melanesian and Australian aboriginal (Type 8).

By 1891 Topinard was questioning the assumptions used to assess relative racial worth in his earlier works. He noted in his L'Homme dans la nature

Is the fundamental superiority of one race really betrayed outwardly by some material sign? We are still in ignorance upon this point. But when we examine it more closely, we are led to think that it is not so.

== Publications ==
- Quelques aperçus sur la chirurgie anglaise (1860)
- "Étude sur les Tasmaniens". Mémoires de la Société d'Anthropologie de Paris. 1 (3). Paris: 307–329. 1868.
- "Étude sur les races indigènes de l'Australie". Bulletins de la Société d'Anthropologie de Paris. 2 (7). Paris: 211–327. 1872.
- "Sur les métis australiens". Bulletins de la Société d'Anthropologie de Paris. 2 (7). Paris: 227–240. 1875.
- L'Anthopologie. Paris: C. Reinwald et Cie. 1876.
- Éléments d'anthropologie générale. Paris: A. Delahaye et É. Lecrosnier. 1885.
- "De la notion de race en anthropologie". Revue d'Anthropologie. 2 (2): 589–660. 1879.
- "Présentation de trois Australiens vivants (Séance du 19 novembre 1885)". Bulletins de la Société d'Anthropologie de Paris. 3 (8). Paris: 683–698. 1885.
- "Mensuration des crânes des grottes de Baye (époque néolithique) d'après les registres de Broca". Revue d'Anthropologie. 3 (1): 1–9. 1886.
- "Les dernières étapes de la généalogie de l'homme". Revue d'Anthropologie. 3 (3): 298–332. 1888.
- L'Homme dans la nature (1891)
- Science et foi. L'anthropologie et la science sociale (1900)

== See also ==
- James Bonwick, who studied with Topinard in Paris.
- Scientific racism

== Bibliography ==
- Douglas, Bronwen; Ballard, Chris, eds. (2008). Foreign bodies: Oceania and the science of race 1750-1940. ANU E Press. ISBN 978-1-921313-99-8.
- Brantlinger, Patrick (2011). Taming Cannibals: Race and the Victorians. Cornell University Press. ISBN 978-0-8014-5019-8.
- Carson, John (2007). The measure of merit: talents, intelligence, and inequality in the French and American republics, 1750-1940. Princeton University Press. ISBN 978-0-691-01715-0.
- Fluehr-Lobban, Carolyn (2006). Race and racism: an introduction. Rowman Altamira. ISBN 978-0-7591-0795-3.
- "Risley, Sir Herbert Hope". Oxford Dictionary of National Biography (online ed.). Oxford University Press. doi:10.1093/ref:odnb/35760. (Subscription, Wikipedia Library access or UK public library membership required.)
- Roberts, William J. (2004). France: a reference guide from the Renaissance to the present. Infobase Publishing. ISBN 978-0-8160-4473-3.
