= William Crooke =

British orientalist (1848–1923)

William Crooke CIE FBA (6 August 1848 – 25 October 1923) was a British orientalist and a key figure in the study and documentation of Anglo-Indian folklore. He was born in County Cork, Ireland, and was educated at Erasmus Smith's Tipperary Grammar School and Trinity College, Dublin.

Crooke joined the Indian Civil Service. While an administrator in India, he found abundant material for his researches in the ancient civilizations of the country. He found ample time to write much on the people of India, their religions, beliefs and customs. He was also an accomplished hunter.

Although Crooke was a gifted administrator, his career in the ICS lasted only 25 years because of personality clashes with his superiors. He returned to England and in 1910, he was chosen to be the president of the Anthropological Section of the British Association. In 1911, having been for many years a member of the council of the Folklore Society, he was elected its president. Re-elected as president of the society in the following year, he then became the editor of its journal, Folk-lore, in 1915. He continued in this last position until his death at a nursing home in Cheltenham, Gloucestershire, on 25 October 1923.

Crooke received various honours later in life, including degrees from the universities of Oxford and Dublin and a fellowship of the British Academy.

== Early life ==
William Crooke was born on 6 August 1848 in Macroom, County Cork. He was one of three sons of an English family that had been settled in Ireland for many years. His father, Warren, was a doctor. He was educated at Erasmus Smith's Tipperary Grammar School, then won a scholarship to Trinity College, Dublin. He graduated from there with a BA degree.

== Indian Civil Service ==
In 1871, Crooke passed the competitive examination for the Indian Civil Service (ICS). He arrived in India on 2 November and spent his entire 25-year tenure in the North-Western Provinces and Oudh, the area where the Indian Rebellion of 1857 had come close to causing the collapse of British control in India and which had resulted in jurisdiction being taken from the hands of the British East India Company in favour of direct control by the British government. During this time, he held charge as Magistrate and Collector of various districts such as Etah, Saharanpur, Gorakhpur and Mirzapur, and would have held sole power over around 300,000 people with regard to judicial and revenue matters. His near-contemporary, Richard Carnac Temple (1850–1931) described Crooke's work as an "uneventful though strenuous official life" and noted that Crooke had the time to demonstrate his skills in hunting tigers.

== Ethnology while in India ==
In the aftermath of the 1857 revolt, members of the ICS such as Temple believed that if a similar event was to be avoided in the future then it was necessary to obtain a better understanding of their colonial subjects and in particular those from the rural areas. Crooke engaged such a process, working with those subjects in his official capacity and also studying them, although he noted that it was impossible to do both simultaneously because if he asked any general questions during official business then he would be "met with coldness or distrust, or will suddenly find himself unable to make himself unintelligible in the local dialect." These amateur studies led to his 1888 book, A Rural and Agricultural Glossary of the NW Provinces and Oudh, following his contributions to The Indian Antiquary that began in 1882.

Crooke had a burst of activity as a published ethnologist in the field. This began in 1890 (Note: There are inconsistencies regarding the date. Rose says that the editorship of Notes and Queries began in 1890, while Naithani says the same in her work of 2006 but had previously said it began in 1887 when Temple took on the editorship of Indian Antiquary.) when he took over a journal previously edited by Temple, who had moved to Burma. Over the next six years, Crooke's output in the field of ethnography was considerable, comprising the journal, two volumes of Popular Religion and Folklore and the four volumes that make up Tribes and Castes of the North Western Provinces; in addition, he continued to contribute to journals produced by other people.

=== Notes and Queries ===
Temple's journal was renamed from Punjab Notes and Queries to North Indian Notes and Queries and first appeared under that new name in 1891. (Note: Content from Notes and Queries was summarised and commented on regularly in Folk-lore from at least as early as 1894, usually by W. H. D. Rouse.) Published from Allahabad, Sadhana Naithani believes that the journal demonstrates "the emergence and growth of that brand of ethnography for which Crooke should be better known and in which he differs from most other colonial ethnographers." The defining feature of the journal was that it considered its subjects in the context of the popular culture of the present day rather than dwelling on the past.

Crooke changed the focus of Temple's journal, which had previously contained material from across south Asia but henceforth concentrated on the subject of North India and, in particular, on those areas where Crooke believed the dominant language to be of an Aryan variety. The April 1891 edition made this clear:

The title has for the present been extended so as to include, roughly speaking, that portion of India where the language of the people is of the Aryan type. We shall, however, insert occasionally notes and queries in connection with the Dravidian, Kolarian and Tibeto-Burman races."

Although intended for the British audience in India, as were numerous other such publications of the time, it was Indians who provided almost all of the content for the revised Notes and Queries format. One in particular featured heavily: Pandit Ram Gharib Chaube. An eager Indian scholar, Chaube first contributed in 1892 and thereafter his input accounted for around a third of each edition, which was rather more than even Crooke supplied. It initially maintained Temple's coverage of a vast range of subjects, from antiquities through folklore, philology, history, numismatology, ethnology, sociology and religion, as well as examining fields such as arts and manufacture. However, the focus soon narrowed to cover four subject areas, being religion, anthropology, folktales and miscellany. The folktales section had been renamed from "folklore" and its emphasis changed from documenting ancient remedies and suchlike to recording traditional stories.

The work on folklore was to prove important, according to Naithani, even though it came towards the end of a prolonged period during which various missionaries and British colonial officials had been documenting the phenomenon. Unlike many other such collections of the time, Notes and Queries generally acknowledged the people who provided folklore information, noted their precise location in the region and also tried to gather information from a broad spectrum of society, although this did not extend as far as including the input of women. It was work in which Chaube was heavily involved as a methodical collector, collator and translator, and the output was based on what were considered to be scientific principles of analysis and depiction. Naithani says of Notes and Queries that

... in its concern with the real, it placed itself in the rural society — its everyday culture, its age-old customs, its local gods and godlings whose fame remained within the boundaries of the village and around whom no great religious institution existed or had grown — and in the fictional narratives that the rural society enjoyed, transmitted and produced."

Notes and Queries may not have been well received by the governing elite of the day. (Note: Although many of his earlier works were published by the Government Presses in India, this did not confer any official status to them; it was a standard practice of the time.) Naithani has suggested that Crooke's provision of this outlet for the Indian voices which lamented the loss of the past and the drive towards what the British deemed to be civilisation could have been one reason why he was marginalised within the bureaucracy. The journal ceased publication on his retirement from the ICS, with Rose noting that this was because of "the prevailing apathy and utter lack of official support".

=== Popular Religion and Folklore ===
Crooke's Popular Religion and Folklore was more successful with the British audience than had been Notes and Queries. It was published firstly in 1894, quickly selling out and then being re-issued as a two volume revised and illustrated edition in 1896. This pair of volumes examined the reality of Hindu worship in northern India from the perspective of its popular manifestation. In rural areas, practical Hinduism differed dramatically from organised vedic Hinduism and included cult worship of a multitude of local deities which were not formally recognised by the vedas but exerted a greater influence on the rhythms, meanings and decisions of day-to-day life. Crooke's study may have been the first to look at the religion through eyes other than those of missionaries or the Hindu elite and was in the opinion of Naithani, "a counter to the established school of German and British indology, which was obsessed with scriptures, palm-leaf manuscripts and their translation, and the exact age of Indian civilisation ... [It] sought to fill a gap in European intellectual knowledge of India by documenting living traditions in a serious and accessible manner. Crooke conformed to the colonial program but gave it a new interpretation."

Chaube, who was an intelligent scholar with a BA from Presidency College in Calcutta, subsequently claimed to have assisted with much information in Popular Religion and he resented that his input was not acknowledged by Crooke. His contribution to Tribes and Castes of the North Western Provinces, published in 1896, was only briefly acknowledged in two footnotes. The relative contributions to the latter have been described by Chandrashekhar Shukl: "While Chaube was going places collecting information, Crooke used to sometimes delve into collecting tit bits." Crooke did, however, pay Chaube well and he did so from his own pocket.

A third edition was in preparation at the time of Crooke's death.

=== Tribes and Castes ===
The four volumes of Tribes and Castes of the North Western Provinces – the area now encompassed by Uttar Pradesh – were produced for the Raj government, as a part of the Ethnographic Survey of India project that had been initiated in 1901.

It has been noted by modern academics, such as Thomas R. Metcalf and Crispin Bates, that Crooke was involved in a contemporary debate regarding the nature of caste. Whereas Crooke was among those who believed caste to be defined by occupation, that someone was born into a community that traditionally performed work such as cow-herding or barbering, Herbert Hope Risley believed that there was a racial definition and went to considerable lengths to collect anthropometric data to support his position. Bates believes that Crooke was Risley's "principal rival and critic" in this debate. According to Susan Bayly

Those like (Sir William) Hunter, as well as the key figures of H. H. Risley (1851–1911) and his protégé Edgar Thurston, who were disciples of the French race theorist Topinard and his European followers, subsumed discussions of caste into theories of biologically determined race essences, ... Their great rivals were the material or occupational theorists led by the ethnographer and folklorist William Crooke (1848–1923), author of one of the most widely read provincial Castes and Tribes surveys, and such other influential scholar-officials as Denzil Ibbetson and E. A. H. Blunt.

== Studies in retirement ==
Crooke left India in 1896 after 25 years service spent entirely in the Northwestern Provinces and Oudh. He received a generous pension, as was usual for employees of the ICS, and returned to England with a reputation for scholarship, particularly in the field of folklore. According to Horace Rose he was "too outspoken a critic of the mechanically efficient 'Secretariat' system" to find favour with his superiors, hence his relatively early retirement.

Thereafter, Crooke spent his time working principally on matters relating to the study of India and of folklore generally. Aside from contributing articles for the Encyclopedia of Religion and Ethics and for journals such as Folk-lore and those of the (Royal) Anthropological Institute, he wrote books including Things Indian, and Northern India (for the Native Races of the British Empire series). He also edited several other works, such as the memorial edition of Risley's The People of India, Fryer's New Account of East India and Persia and James Tod's Annals of Rajast'han. Crooke was the editor of the second edition (published 1903) of the dictionary of Anglo-Indian usage and loan words Hobson-Jobson, "add[ing] a few entries and some further quotations, and correct[ing] some etymologies". Among his various studies that were wholly unrelated to India was a draft book called Homeric Folk-Lore; although this was never published, an article on the subject was printed.

Crooke also had an interest in archaeological matters and produced a paper – The Rude Stone Monuments of India – for the Proceedings of the Cotteswold Naturalists' Field Club in 1905. (Note: His obituary, written by Rose in 1923, incorrectly states that this paper was published in the Transactions of the Bristol and Gloucestershire Archaeological Society.) In 1911 he was President of that body and delivered his Address on the theme of The importance of anthropological investigation. He was also a member of The Bristol and Gloucestershire Archaeological Society, of which he sat on the Council in 1901 and 1917.

== Family ==
Crooke was somewhat detached from his much younger wife, Alice, and their five sons, as indeed he had been when in India. They had married in 1884 and one of his grandchildren has said that "Well, it was a strange marriage". Three of the sons predeceased him, two of whom died in World War I.

== Legacy ==
In 1919 Crooke was awarded a DSc by the University of Oxford and also became a Companion of the Order of the Indian Empire (CIE). In 1920 he was awarded a DLitt, by the University of Dublin and in 1923 he was elected a Fellow of the British Academy.

Rose wrote of Crooke's contribution to studies of India that

The Indian of the United Provinces may forget his name, but what he stood for will never be forgotten. Crooke did not seek self-advancement. He gave freely of his energies and abilities and of his means to the best interests of India. He made culpable ignorance of the Indian peoples no longer pardonable. Singularly staunch and loyal as a friend, he never wavered in his allegiance to the people under his charge, and the good he wrought will some day and in some manner bear fruit.

Richard Mercer Dorson describes Crooke as "the central figure in Anglo-Indian folklore". However, in his role as an editor he has been viewed sometimes as adopting an interventionist approach, as with his work on Tod's Annals and Antiquities of Rajast'han or the Central and Western Rajpoot States of India which Norbert Peabody believes under Crooke's hand may have become "a cipher for interpreting the Hindu political order writ large".
