= Émile Senart =

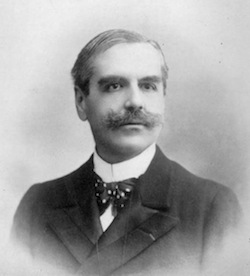
- Born: Émile Charles Marie Senart; 26 March 1847; Reims
- Died: 21 February 1928 (aged 80); Paris
- Occupation: Indologist

Émile Charles Marie Senart (26 March 1847 – 21 February 1928) was a French Indologist.

Besides numerous epigraphic works, we owe him several translations in French of Buddhist and Hindu texts, including several Upaniṣad.

He was Paul Pelliot's professor at the Collège de France.

He was elected a member of the Académie des inscriptions et belles-lettres in 1882, president of the Société asiatique from 1908 to 1928 and founder of the "Association française des amis de l'Orient" in 1920.

== Selected works ==
- 1875: Essai sur la légende du Bouddha - Paris.
- Les Inscriptions de Piyadasi - Paris
- 1881: Les Inscriptions de Piyadasi / 1 / Les quatorze édits.
- 1886: Les Inscriptions de Piyadasi / 2 / L.édits détachés. L'auteur et la langue des édits.
- 1882–1897: Le Mahāvastu: Sanskrit text. Published for the first time and accompanied by introductions and commentary by E. Sénart. - Paris : Imprimerie Nationale, 1882–1897, Volume 1/ 1882, Volume 2/ 1890, Volume 3/ 1897
- 1889: Gustave Garrez
- 1896: Les Castes dans l'Inde, les faits et le système - Paris (Caste in India. Translated by E. Denison Ross. London 1930)
- 1901: Text of Inscriptions discovered at the Niya Site, 1901 / Transcr. and edited by A. M. Boyer, E. J. Rapson and E. Senart. Oxford : Clarendon Press, 1920 (Kharosthi Inscriptions discovered by Sir Aurel Stein in Chinese Turkestan ; 1)
- 1907: Origines Bouddhiques
- 1927: Text of Inscriptions discovered at the Niya, Endere, and Lou-lan Sites, 1906-7 / Auguste M. Boyer; Edward James Rapson; Émile Charles Marie Senart. - Oxford.
- 1930: Chāndogya Upaniṣad Translated and annotated by Émile Sénart, Société d'édition: Les Belles Lettres, Paris.

== Sources ==
- This article contains text from a document on the La vie rémoise site.
- Finot, Louis (1928). Emile Senart, Bulletin de l'École française d'Extrême-Orient Année 28 (1), 335-347
