= Perowne =

Perowne is an English surname which is a double diminutive of Piers and of Huguenot origin. It may refer to:

- Arthur Perowne (1930–2018), English amateur golfer
- Barry Perowne pseudonym of the British writer Philip Atkey (1908–1985)
- Brian Perowne (born 1947), retired Royal Navy admiral
- James Perowne (born 1947), retired Royal Navy admiral

or the descendants of John Perowne, priest and missionary to Burdwan:

- John Perowne (1823–1904), Bishop of Worcester
  - John Perowne (army officer) (1863–1954), son of John
    - Lancelot Perowne (1902–1982), British Army general
    - Victor Perowne (1897–1951), British diplomat
  - Arthur Perowne (1867–1948), Bishop of Bradford, and of Worcester; son of John
    - Stewart Perowne (1901–1989), diplomat, archaeologist, explorer and historian; son of Arthur
    - Freya Stark (1893–1993), British explorer and travel writer; sometime wife of Stewart
- Thomas Perowne (died 1913) (1824–1913), Archdeacon of Norwich; brother of John
  - Thomas Perowne (died 1954) (1868–1954), Archdeacon of Norwich; son of Thomas
- Edward Perowne (1826–1906), priest, Vice-Chancellor of the University of Cambridge; brother of John

== See also ==
- Bishop Perowne CofE College, Worcester, England
- Perowne Barracks, former British Army barracks in Hong Kong
