= Cambridge Bible for Schools and Colleges =

Biblical commentary set published in 56 volumes by Cambridge University Press

The Cambridge Bible for Schools and Colleges is a biblical commentary set published in 56 volumes by Cambridge University Press between 1878 and 1918. Many volumes went through multiple reprintings, while some volumes were also revised, usually by another author, from 1908 to 1918. Early volumes used the Authorised Version as the base text. Later volumes, and several of the revised editions, instead used the Revised Version, which had appeared in three stages 1881–1894.

Anglican bishop John Perowne was the general editor, with A. F. Kirkpatrick the editor for the Old Testament and Apocrypha, and Reginald St John Parry for the New Testament. The first section published was written by theologian Edward Hayes Plumptre in 1878 and covered the Epistle of St. James; the last volumes to appear, in 1918, were Deuteronomy by Sir George Adam Smith, and the revised edition of Joshua by George Albert Cooke.

The editors exercised limited editorial control over the writers of individual commentaries. Perowne stated that his aim was "to leave each contributor to the unfettered exercise of his own judgment".

== Volumes and contributors ==
Serial no.	Volume	Contributor	Date	Notes
1	An Introduction to the Pentateuch	Arthur Thomas Chapman	1911	
2	Genesis	Herbert Edward Ryle	1914	
3	Exodus	Samuel Rolles Driver	1911	
4	Leviticus	Arthur Thomas Chapman and Annesley William Streane	1914	
5	Numbers	Alan Hugh McNeile	1911	
6	Deuteronomy	George Adam Smith	1918	
7	Joshua	George Frederick Maclear	1878	
8	Joshua	George Albert Cooke	1918	Revised edition
9	Judges	John James Lias	1882	
10	Judges & Ruth	George Albert Cooke	1913	Revised edition
11	1 Samuel	Alexander Francis Kirkpatrick	1880	
12	2 Samuel	Alexander Francis Kirkpatrick	1881	
13	1 Kings	Joseph Rawson Lumby	1886	
14	1 Kings	William Emery Barnes	1908	Revised edition
15	2 Kings	Joseph Rawson Lumby	1887	
16	2 Kings	William Emery Barnes	1908	Revised edition
17	1 & 2 Chronicles	William Emery Barnes	1899	
18	Ezra & Nehemiah	Herbert Edward Ryle	1893	
19	Esther	Annesley William Streane	1907	
20	Job	Andrew Bruce Davidson	1884	
21	Psalms 1-41 (Book I)	Alexander Francis Kirkpatrick	1891	
22	Psalms 42-89 (Books II & III)	Alexander Francis Kirkpatrick	1895	
23	Psalms 90-150 (Books IV & V)	Alexander Francis Kirkpatrick	1901	A combined edition of the three individual volumes on the Psalms was issued in 1902
24	Proverbs	Thomas Thomason Perowne	1899	
25	Ecclesiastes; or, the Preacher	Edward Hayes Plumptre	1881	
26	Song of Solomon	Andrew Harper	1902	
27	Isaiah 1-39	John Skinner	1896	
28	Isaiah 1-39	John Skinner	1915	Revised edition
29	Isaiah 40-66	John Skinner	1898	
30	Jeremiah & Lamentations	Annesley William Streane	1881	
31	Jeremiah & Lamentations	Annesley William Streane	1913	Updated edition, using Revised Version
32	Ezekiel	Andrew Bruce Davidson	1892	
33	Daniel	Samuel Rolles Driver	1900	
34	Hosea	Thomas Kelly Cheyne	1884	
35	Joel & Amos	Samuel Rolles Driver	1897	
36	Joel & Amos	Samuel Rolles Driver	1915	Adapted to the Revised Version by Henry Craven Ord Lanchester
37	Obadiah & Jonah	Thomas Thomason Perowne	1883	
38	Micah	Thomas Kelly Cheyne	1891	
39	Nahum, Habakkuk & Zephaniah	Andrew Bruce Davidson	1896	
40	Haggai, Zechariah & Malachi	Thomas Thomason Perowne	1890	
41	Haggai, Zechariah & Malachi	William Emery Barnes	1917	Revised edition
42	Wisdom of Solomon	John Allen Fitzgerald Gregg	1909	
43	1 Maccabees	William Fairweather and John Sutherland Black	1897	
44	Wisdom of Jesus the son of Sirach; or, Ecclesiasticus	William Oscar Emil Oesterley	1912	
45	Matthew	Arthur Carr (Note: Carr was a Fellow of Oriel College, Oxford and Assistant Master at Wellington College.)	1881	
46	Mark	George Frederick Maclear	1892	
47	Mark	Alfred Plummer	1915	Revised edition
48	Luke	Frederic William Farrar	1888	
49	John	Alfred Plummer	1880	
50	Acts 1-14	Joseph Rawson Lumby	1881	
51	Acts 15-28	Joseph Rawson Lumby	1884	
52	Romans	Handley Carr Glyn Moule	1879	
53	1 Corinthians	John James Lias	1881	
54	2 Corinthians	John James Lias	1879	
55	Galatians	Edward Henry Perowne	1890	
56	Ephesians	Handley Carr Glyn Moule	1886	
57	Philippians	Handley Carr Glyn Moule	1889	
58	Colossians & Philemon	Handley Carr Glyn Moule	1893	
59	1 Thessalonians & 2 Thessalonians	George Gillanders Findlay	1891	
60	1 & 2 Timothy, & Titus	Alfred Edward Humphreys	1895	
61	Hebrews	Frederic William Farrar	1883	
62	James	Edward Hayes Plumptre	1878	
63	1 Peter, 2 Peter & Jude	Edward Hayes Plumptre	1893	
64	1, 2 and 3 John	Alfred Plummer (Note: Alfred Plummer (1841–1926) was master of University College Durham.)	1892	
65	Revelation	William Henry Simcox	1890	
