= Thomas Perowne =

Thomas Perowne may refer to:

- Thomas Perowne (died 1913) (1824–1913), Archdeacon of Norwich
- Thomas Perowne (died 1954) (1889–1954), Archdeacon of Norwich
