= Bishop Perowne Church of England College =

Location
- Merriman's Hill Road; Worcester, Worcestershire, WR3 8LE; England; 52°12′17″N 2°13′02″W

Information
- Type: Academy
- Motto: Endeavour Forever
- Religious affiliation: Church of England
- Established: 1963
- Local authority: Worcestershire
- Specialist: Performing Arts College
- Department for Education URN: 138107 Tables
- Ofsted: Reports
- Chair: Judith Pettersen
- Headteacher: Jane Price
- Gender: All
- Age: 11 to 16
- Enrolment: 1350
- Houses: Dunstan, Goodrich, Oswald, Wulfstan
- Colours: blue, red, yellow, green
- Website: http://www.bishopperowne.co.uk/

Bishop Perowne CE College is a Church of England secondary school with academy status located in Worcester, Worcestershire, England. It is a co-educational school, with a capacity of 1,350 pupils aged between 11 and 16.

The school is a specialist Performing Arts College and was the first Worcestershire school to take Specialist Performing Arts status in 2002.

The school takes its name from two former Bishops of Worcester, John Perowne (Bishop of Worcester 1891–1901), and his son Arthur Perowne (Bishop of Worcester 1931–1941).

An Ofsted inspection in May 2012 judged the school to be Grade 2, a rating of Good. Lead inspector Michael Miller said: "The proportion of students achieving, and currently on track to achieve, five or more higher grade GCSE passes, including English and Mathematics, is above average. Opportunities for performance through the school's specialist status benefit students well and boost their confidence."

== Notable alumni ==
- Chris Beardshaw (born 1969), gardener and broadcaster
- Matt Richards (born 2002), freestyle swimmer

== Awards ==
- Leading Aspect Award
- Arts mark Gold
