= Arthur Perowne =

British Anglican bishop

- Bishop of Worcester
- Diocese: Diocese of Worcester
- In office: 1931–1941
- Predecessor: Ernest Pearce
- Successor: William Wilson Cash
- Other posts: Archdeacon of Plymouth (&c.; 1918–1920); Bishop of Bradford (1920–1931)

Orders
- Ordination: 1893 (deacon); 1894 (priest) by his father
- Consecration: 1920 by Cosmo Gordon Lang

Personal details
- Born: Arthur William Thomson Perowne; 13 June 1867
- Died: 9 April 1948 (aged 80) Gloucester, Gloucestershire, United Kingdom
- Denomination: Anglican
- Parents: John Perowne and Anna Maria Raikea Woolrych
- Spouse: 1) Helena Oldnall Russell (m. 1895-1922; her death); 2) Mabel Bailey (m. 1926)
- Children: 3 sons, incl. Stewart
- Education: King's College, Cambridge

Arthur William Thomson Perowne (13 June 1867 – 9 April 1948) was an Anglican bishop in Britain. He was the first Bishop of Bradford and, from 1931, was the Bishop of Worcester.

== Birth family and education ==
Perowne was born into a distinguished ecclesiastical family: he was the fourth son of John Perowne, sometime Bishop of Worcester and Anna Maria Raikea Woolrych, his uncles Thomas and Edward were Archdeacon of Norwich and Vice-Chancellor of the University of Cambridge respectively and his first-cousin Thomas also Archdeacon of Norwich. He was educated at Haileybury and Imperial Service College and King's College, Cambridge (he was admitted 4 October 1886, matriculated that Michaelmas, and gained the degrees of Bachelor of Arts {BA, 1889}, Cambridge Master of Arts {MA(Cantab), 1893}, and Doctor of Divinity {DD, 1920}).

== Priest ==
Having been assistant master at Magdalen College Choir School, Oxford since 1890, Perowne was ordained a deacon on Trinity Sunday (28 May) 1893 and a priest on Trinity Sunday (20 May) 1894 (both times by his father, the Bishop of Worcester, in Worcester Cathedral), beginning his ministry with his title post as a curate at Hartlebury, Worcestershire (being also a chaplain to his father, the Bishop). His first incumbency was as Vicar of St Philip & St James, Hallow, Worcestershire (1901–1904), after which he became Vicar of St George's Edgbaston, Warwickshire from 1904, Rural Dean of Edgbaston from 1905 and an honorary canon of Birmingham Cathedral from 1912.

In 1913, he left all three posts in Warkwickshire for Devon, where he became Vicar of St Andrew's, Plymouth; he became additionally Rural Dean for the Three Towns (i.e. the wider Borough of Plymouth), 1914–1918, a Prebendary of Exeter Cathedral from 1917, Archdeacon of Plymouth from 1918, and a Chaplain to the King from 1918, remaining as Vicar of Plymouth throughout, until he relinquished them all in 1920.

== Bishop ==
His appointment to become Bishop of Bradford, the first bishop diocesan of the new Diocese of Bradford, was announced on 12 December 1919, and he was ordained and consecrated a bishop by Cosmo Gordon Lang, Archbishop of York, at York Minster on Candlemas (2 February) 1910. He was translated to become Bishop of Worcester (in which See his father had served until 1901) in 1931 and retired in 1941.

== Marriages, family and death ==
In 1895, he married Helena Frances Oldnall-Russell (1869–1922). They had three sons: Francis Edward Perowne (1898–1988), Stewart Perowne, a diplomat, archaeologist and historian, and Leslie Arthur Perowne (1906–1997), sometime Head of Music at the BBC, who was responsible for bringing Albert Ketèlbey out of retirement to conduct a huge BBC Ketèlbey Concert at the Royal Albert Hall, prior to World War II.

A keen fisherman, he lived retirement in Gloucester (where he died) with his second wife, Mabel (1886–1968), the second daughter of Thomas Henry Bailey of Wyldcroft in Wokingham, whom he had married in 1926.

== Family tree ==
Church of England titles
New diocese	Bishop of Bradford; 1920–1931	Succeeded by Alfred Blunt
Preceded by Ernest Pearce	Bishop of Worcester; 1931–1941	Succeeded by William Wilson Cash
