= Andrew B. Davidson =

Scottish academic and minister (1831–1902)

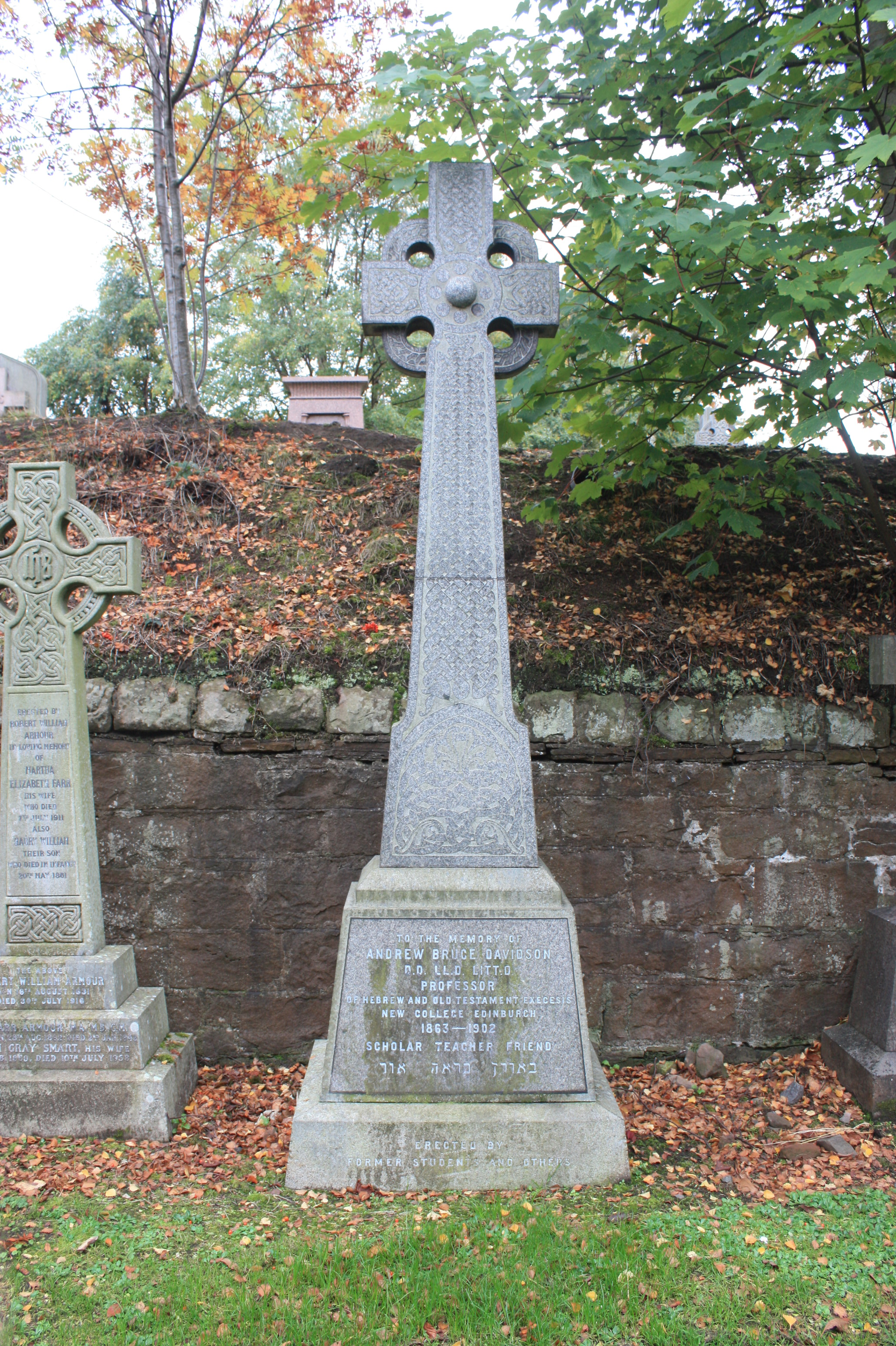
The grave of Andrew Bruce Davidson, Grange Cemetery, Edinburgh

Andrew Bruce Davidson DD LLD DLit (25 April 1831 – 26 January 1902) was an ordained minister in the Free Church of Scotland and Professor of Hebrew and Oriental languages in New College, University of Edinburgh.

== Life and career ==
Davidson was born at Kirkhill, in the parish of Ellon, Aberdeenshire, Scotland, on 25 April 1831. He was educated initially at Aberdeen Grammar School under Dr Melvin and afterwards at the University of Aberdeen, graduating in 1849. Following graduation he took the position of teacher in the Free Church school in Ellon and while in that position taught himself French, German, Dutch and Spanish in addition to the classical languages he already knew. He entered New College, Edinburgh, in 1852, to study for the ministry, and was licensed in 1857.

While a student in 1854, Davidson went during the vacation to study under Heinrich Ewald in the University of Göttingen. Following his licensing in 1857 he became a missioner first in Carstairs Junction/Village and later in Craigsmill, near Blairgowrie, thereafter a Probationer Minister in Gilcomston Free Church under the ministry of Dr MacGilvary for a period of six months. In 1858, Davidson became Hebrew tutor in New College, with the express purpose of teaching the Hebrew language to the first class. During this appointment he produced his first book on the Hebrew language in 1861 "Outlines of Hebrew Accentuation" which was followed later during his professorship by an Elementary Hebrew Grammar (1st ed., 1874) and his Hebrew Syntax (1894). An examination of his Hebrew Syntax reveals that Davidson had an intimate knowledge of the comparative syntax of Syriac and Aramaic, Arabic, Ethiopic and Assyrian.

In 1862, his first book on Job (chapters 1–14) was published by Williams & Norgate. Despite the fact that he never finished this project, it was still classed as "the first really scientific commentary on the Old Testament in the English language." When, in the following year, the chair of Hebrew fell vacant, Davidson was appointed professor by the unanimous vote of the Free Church Assembly. In 1871 he was chosen to be one of the Old Testament revision committee—a position he held until 1884, which resulted in the publication of the Old Testament section of the Revised Version of the Bible in 1885. As far as his teaching in New College, Edinburgh, is concerned, most of it was published after his death in volumes entitled, 'Biblical and literary Essays,' 'Old Testament Prophecy,' and 'The Theology of the Old Testament.'

Davidson understood it to be the first duty of an exegete to ascertain the meaning of the writer, and he showed that this could be done by the use of grammar and history and the historical imagination. He supplied guidance when it was much needed as to the methods and results of the higher criticism. Being a master of its methods, but very cautious in accepting assertions about its results, he secured attention early in the Free Church for scientific criticism, and yet threw the whole weight of his learning and his caustic wit into the argument against critical extravagance. He had thought himself into the ideas and points of view of the Hebrews, and his work in Old Testament theology is unrivalled.

== Development of his critical views ==
It is a moot question as to how and when Davidson's critical views on the authorship of the Pentateuch actually evolved. It is equally a moot question as to what these actually were. At the beginning of his teaching career he wrote in defence of the Mosaic authorship of the Pentateuch. However, by 1863 he had retreated to a partial Mosaic authorship in a further article in the same journal. From the notes of lectures taken by one of his students (Henry Drummond) it is clear that Davidson was then discoursing to his class on Pentateuchal criticism, but with a leaning to more conservative positions. In fact Drummond had recorded that, "Davidson did not then take his students beyond the positions reached by Ewald."

The next piece of evidence comes from Davidson's review of Franz Delitzsch's Neuer Commentar űber Genesis and August Dillmann's Numeri, Deuteronomium, und Joshua which is regarded by Strahan as "important as perhaps the first indication of his accepting Wellhausen's general position, which he is careful to guard against misconception and exaggeration." In the first of those reviews he noted "the improbability of Moses having given one system of laws (Exodus chaps. 20ff.) at Sinai and another so very different (Deuteronomy) on the plains of Moab; and the impossibility of conceiving of Deuteronomy as extant in the days of the judges and early monarchy". In the second on the work of Dillmann he noted that, "he is dissatisfied with that scholar's theory of the origin for the Priestly code in the eighth century and leans to a later date." These briefs comments are the only published explicit statements that Davidson ever made.

The manuscript of Davidson's course on Pentateuchal criticism was never published, nor has it survived in any other form. What is known of its contents of comes from the biography of Henry Drummond, which states that, "Besides the grammar, Dr Davidson then gave to the First Year a few lectures introductory to the Higher Criticism of the Pentateuch. It was by such lectures that Dr Davidson started in the early seventies the great movement of Old Testament study which has characterised Scottish Theology during the last thirty years. He did not then take his students beyond the positions reached by Ewald; but that was sufficient to break up the mechanical ideas of inspiration which then prevailed in the churches, while, with the teacher's own wonderful insight into the spiritual meaning of Scripture, it made the student's own use of his Bible more rational and lively, and laid upon a sounder basis the proof of a real revelation in the Old Testament."

The final question which may be asked on this topic is whether Davidson ever accepted in full the tenets of the documentary theory of the origin of the Pentateuch. The answer to that question, in as far as it can be answered is that they did not. There are two reasons for this answer, the first of which is that he had studied as was noted earlier under Heinrich Ewald, who had revived Wellhausen's interest in the Hebrew language and history in his teaching, but Ewald never accepted the basis of the documentary hypothesis. The second reason has been reported by Professor Andrew Harper who stated that, "Consequently, though he recognised the greatness of scholars like Wellhausen, he was never affected by the Wellhausen or other orthodoxies which soon grew up in the critical schools". Finally, it is a fact that, "he remained sceptical and even sarcastic of the finer distinctions, to which so many critics have carried literary analysis within the limits of the four main Pentateuchal documents." A piece of supportive evidence which should be considered is the fact that in a recently published collection of the letters written by Julius Wellhausen to various correspondents around the world not one was ever written to Andrew Bruce Davidson, whereas some 118 were written to and in support of William Robertson Smith. It should be further noted that the only Davidson mentioned in Rudolf Smend's collection is that of Professor Samuel Davidson, to whom 2 letters were addressed.

== Death ==
Davidson died at home, Corrennie Gardens in Edinburgh on 26 January 1902. He is buried in Grange Cemetery on the south side of the city. The grave lies on the southern edge of the north-west quadrant, backing onto the embankment over the central vaults.

== Works ==
Davidson's Elementary Hebrew Grammar is still in print, having now reached its 27th edition (published in 1993, revised by James Martin). His Hebrew Syntax is also still in print, having now reached its fourth edition (published in 1994, revised by J.C.L. Gibson). These works were recognised by several honorary distinctions, LL.D. (Aberdeen), D.D. (Edinburgh), Litt.D. (Cambridge).

Davidson contributed to the Cambridge Bible for Schools and Colleges, submitting commentaries on Job, Ezekiel, Nahum, Habakkuk, and Zephaniah. He also wrote, in the series of handbooks published by T&T Clark, a commentary on the Epistle to the Hebrews (1882); and he furnished many articles for Hastings' Dictionary of the Bible, among them "Covenant", "Eschatology of the Old Testament", "God" and "Prophecy".

His posthumously published writings include two volumes of sermons entitled Waiting Upon God and The Called of God, a volume of essays entitled Biblical and Literary Essays, and Old Testament Prophecy. These works have been edited by J. A. Paterson. Another posthumous volume, entitled The Theology of the Old Testament, was edited by S. D. F. Salmond.

=== Controversies ===
Following the publication of a list of Davidson's writings a dispute broke out between its compiler, James Strachan, and James Alexander Paterson who had edited some of Davidson's manuscripts for posthumous publication. On quality of the editing, in his biography Strachan noted that, "no lecture of Professor Davidson's was finer than the one on 'False Prophecy'. It was ultimately published in the Expositor in 1895. But in the posthumous Old Testament Prophecy an ancient and inferior manuscript has again been palmed off upon the innocent reader, while the perfect Expositor article is left in obscurity." This view was supported by George Wishart Anderson. Another dispute concerned the order of the lectures that Davidson had given. Strachan wrote that "Dr Davidson was above everything else a lecturer on Hebrew prophecy. He gave his students a new and inspiring conception of the real nature of Prophecy and its function in the history of Revelation. I fear that many of them will read the posthumous Old Testament Prophecy with a sense of disappointment. They will protest that this is not the Old Testament Prophecy to which they listened. The difference is not merely the absence of the living voice ... the course itself is altered." In fact Paterson had been a student of Davidson in 1874, while Strachan had been a student in 1884. In the time of the Robertson Smith case, Davidson dropped material on Pentateuchal criticism and replaced it with Old Testament Prophecy. George Adam Smith stated "Yet, after the controversy on Robertson Smith's articles broke out, Davidson dropped his lectures on the Pentateuch—they were not given to his students in the later seventies—and did not resume till nine years later." The reason that Davidson himself gave for concentrating on the eighth-century prophets was that with these writings, one was on historical ground.
