= Ernest Pearce =

The Right Reverend Ernest Pearce CBE TD
- Bishop of Worcester
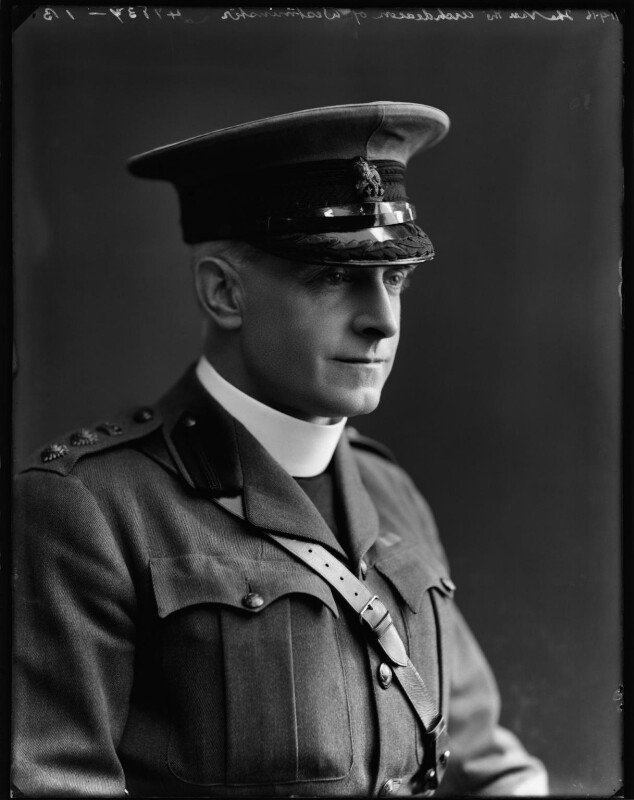
- Pearce in 1916
- Church: Church of England
- Diocese: Diocese of Worcester
- In office: 1919 to 1930
- Predecessor: Huyshe Yeatman-Biggs
- Successor: Arthur Perowne
- Previous post: Canon of Westminster Abbey (1911–1919)

Orders
- Ordination: 1890
- Consecration: 24 February 1919

Personal details
- Born: Ernest Harold Pearce; 23 July 1865
- Died: 28 October 1930 (aged 65)
- Denomination: Anglicanism
- Education: Peterhouse, Cambridge

Ernest Harold Pearce CBE TD (23 July 1865 – 28 October 1930) was an Anglican bishop, the 106th bishop of Worcester from 1919 until his death.

== Biography ==
He was born on 23 July 1865 and was educated at Christ's Hospital and Peterhouse, Cambridge.

Ordained priest in 1890 he was firstly an assistant master and school chaplain at Christ's Hospital. An eminent scholar, he was Professor of Biblical History at Queen's College, London until 1905 when he became Rector of Christ Church Greyfriars in the City of London. In 1911, he was appointed a canon of Westminster Abbey. He then served as treasurer (1912–1916), Archdeacon of Westminster (1916–1918), and sub-dean (1918–1919).

He was subsequently elevated to the See of Worcester. He was consecrated on 24 February 1919. A cleric whose efficiency, powers of rapid work and precision of thought were respected throughout the church, he died suddenly on 28 October 1930, aged 65.

== Works ==
- The Annals of Christ's Hospital, 1901
- The Book of God's Kingdom, 1902
- The Sons of the Clergy, 1904
- English Christianity in its Beginnings, 1908
- The Laws of the Earliest Gospel, 1913
- William de Colchester, 1915
- The Monks of Westminster, 1916
- The Royal Hospitals at Church, 1925
- The Register of Thomas de Cobham, 1317-1327, 1930

Church of England titles
Preceded by Huyshe Wolcott Yeatman-Biggs	Bishop of Worcester; 1919–1931	Succeeded by Arthur William Thomson Perowne
