= Mervyn Charles-Edwards =

English Anglican bishop (1902–1983)

- Bishop of Worcester
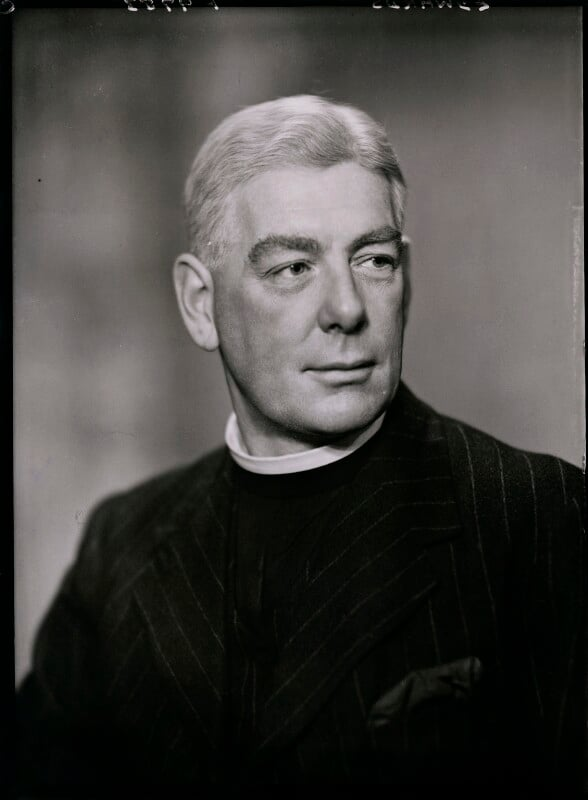
- Charles-Edwards in 1947
- Diocese: Diocese of Worcester
- In office: 1956 – 1970 (ret.)
- Predecessor: William Wilson Cash
- Successor: Robin Woods
- Other post: Vicar of St Martin-in-the-Fields (1947–1955)

Orders
- Ordination: 1925 (deacon); 1926 (priest) by John Kempthorne (Lich.)
- Consecration: 1956 by Geoffrey Fisher (Cantuar)

Personal details
- Born: 6 April 1902
- Died: 20 October 1983 (aged 81)
- Denomination: Anglican
- Education: Keble College, Oxford

Lewis Mervyn Charles-Edwards (called Mervyn; 6 April 1902 – 20 October 1983) was an Anglican bishop in the third quarter of the 20th century.

Born on 6 April 1902, he was educated at Shrewsbury and Keble College, Oxford. After this he studied for ordination at Lichfield Theological College followed by a curacy at Christ Church, Tunstall. He was made deacon on Trinity Sunday (7 June) 1925 and ordained priest on 19 September 1926 — both times by John Kempthorne, Bishop of Lichfield, at Lichfield Cathedral. He then held incumbencies at Marchington and Market Drayton before becoming rural dean of Hodnet then Newark. An Honorary Chaplain to the King, he was Vicar of St Martin-in-the-Fields, London until his elevation to the episcopate in 1956, where he served for 14 years.

He became Bishop of Worcester when his election was confirmed on 2 January (at St Mary-le-Bow) and he was consecrated a bishop on 6 January 1956, by Geoffrey Fisher, Archbishop of Canterbury, at St Paul's Cathedral. A sub-prelate of the Order of St John of Jerusalem he died on 20 October 1983. Mervyn fathered two children, David and Jill.

== Notes ==
Church of England titles
Preceded by William Wilson Cash	Bishop of Worcester; 1956–1970	Succeeded by Robin Woods
