= Alfred Blunt =

English Anglican bishop (1879–1957)

The Right Reverend Alfred Blunt
- Bishop of Bradford
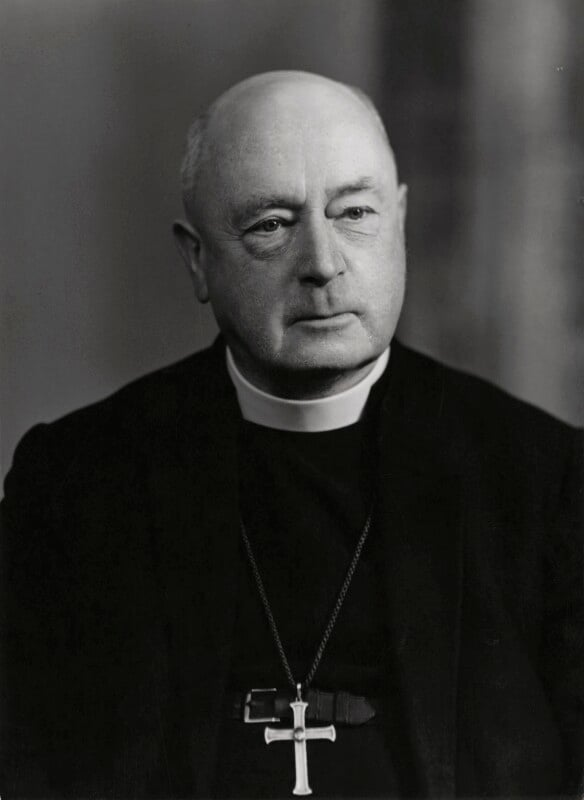
- Blunt in 1948
- Church: Church of England
- Diocese: Bradford
- In office: 1931–1955
- Predecessor: Arthur Perowne
- Successor: Donald Coggan
- Other posts: Canon of Derby and bishop's examining chaplain (1927–1931)

Orders
- Ordination: 1904 (deacon); 1905 (priest)
- Consecration: 1931

Personal details
- Born: Alfred Walter Frank Blunt; 24 September 1879 Saint-Malo, Ille-et-Vilaine, France
- Died: 12 June 1957 (aged 77) York, Yorkshire, England
- Denomination: Anglican
- Spouse: Maggie Duke (m. 1909)
- Education: Exeter College, Oxford

Alfred Walter Frank Blunt (24 September 1879 – 12 June 1957) was an English Anglican bishop. He was the second Bishop of Bradford from 1931 to 1955 and is best known for a speech that exacerbated the abdication crisis of King Edward VIII.

== Birth and education ==
Blunt was born on 24 September 1879 in Saint-Malo, Ille-et-Vilaine, France, where he was brought up before his mother returned the family to England in 1887. He was younger son in second marriage of Captain Francis Theophilus Blunt (1837–1881) of the British Colonial Service, ultimately Chief Civil Commissioner for the Seychelles. His older brother was Edward Arthur Henry Blunt. He was privately educated by his widowed mother, and attended Church Hill preparatory school at Crondall near Farnham, Hampshire, before entering Marlborough College in 1893.

He entered Exeter College, Oxford, where he graduated Bachelor of Arts in 1901, receiving first-class honours in literae humaniores, and was promoted to Master of Arts in 1904. He was later granted by the same university the degrees of Bachelor of Divinity in 1918 and, honoris causa, Doctor of Divinity in 1932.

== Teaching and priesthood ==
Blunt was elected as a tutorial Fellow of Exeter College in March 1902, and as Assistant Master of Wellington College later in 1902 before studying for priesthood at Cuddesdon Theological College. He was ordained deacon in 1904 and priest in 1905 by Francis Paget, Bishop of Oxford, in whose diocese he served as a licensed preacher until 1907, when he became curate at Carrington, Nottingham, an industrial parish. He became its perpetual curate, or vicar, in 1909. He also became examining chaplain to Edwyn Hoskyns (and his successor Bernard Heywood), Bishop of Southwell, its diocesan, from 1911 until 1927.

In 1917 he moved to Derby, to be Vicar of St Werburgh's, another industrial parish. He became honorary canon at Southwell Minster in 1918. In 1920 he was also appointed Rural Dean of Derby. In 1927, when a new Diocese of Derby was formed, he became in turn canon at Derby Cathedral and examining chaplain to Edmund Pearce, Bishop of Derby.

In churchmanship he was an Anglo-Catholic. Politically interested in social justice and a priest who preferred work in slum communities and with youth, he was a member of the Christian Social Union from 1907, and from the time of the general strike of 1926 a member of the Labour Party. While in Derby he became a friend of J. H. Thomas, a local Labour Member of Parliament and future cabinet minister.

== Bishop of Bradford ==
In 1930, Blunt was offered but declined the See of Worcester before becoming Bishop of Bradford the following year. He was consecrated as a bishop on 25 July 1931 and enthroned on 30 November 1931.

He hosted the Anglo-Catholic Conference, over which he presided, at Bradford in 1934. Politically, he drifted leftward and during the Second World War advocated communism (although he criticised the way it was practiced in Soviet Russia) and supported the Beveridge Report in 1943. He became the president of the newly formed Council of Clergy and Ministers for Common Ownership in 1942.

Blunt's work continued, despite mental breakdowns as early as 1931, until he was forced to retire after a stroke in 1955.

== Speech and abdication crisis ==
Blunt's speech was made to his diocesan conference on 1 December 1936. At this stage, the crisis had not come to the notice of the public and, though the press knew of it, they had not yet revealed it. The speech was mundane until Blunt talked about the coronation service:

On this occasion the King holds an avowedly representative position. His personal views and opinions are his own, and as an individual he has the right of us all to be the keeper of his own private conscience. But in his public capacity at his Coronation, he stands for the English people's idea of kingship. It has for long centuries been, and I hope still is, an essential part of that idea that the King needs the grace of God for his office. In the Coronation ceremony the nation definitely acknowledges that need. Whatever it may mean, much or little, to the individual who is crowned, to the people as a whole it means their dedication of the English monarchy to the care of God, in whose rule and governance are the hearts of kings.

Thus, in the second place, not only as important as but far more important than the King's personal feelings are to his Coronation, is the feeling with which we – the people of England – view it. Our part of the ceremony is to fill it with reality, by the sincerity of our belief in the power of God to over-rule for good our national history, and by the sincerity with which we commend the King and nation to his Providence.

Are we going to be merely spectators or listeners-in as at any other interesting function, with a sort of passive curiosity? Or are we in some sense going to consecrate ourselves to the service of God and the welfare of mankind?

He continued:

First, on the faith, prayer, and self-dedication of the King himself; and on that it would be improper for me to say anything except to commend him to God's grace, which he will so abundantly need, as we all need it – for the King is a man like ourselves – if he is to do his duty faithfully. We hope that he is aware of his need. Some of us wish that he gave more positive signs of such awareness.

A Telegraph and Argus reporter, Ronald Harker, was present. He took his notes back to the office and, on conferring with his colleague Charles Leach, agreed that the national media might be interested and sent the story over the wire to the Press Association. The press took this for the first public comment by a notable person on the crisis and it became front-page news on 3 December. Eight days later, King Edward VIII abdicated. When asked about it later, Blunt revealed that the comments he made had been intended to be a lament of the King's indifference to churchgoing. Like most other Britons, he had never even heard of Wallis Simpson.

The Bishop's doubts about Edward VIII's piety stood in marked contrast with the views of some other clergy such as the Rev Robert Anderson Jardine, of Darlington, who several months later conducted the wedding ceremony of the Duke of Windsor and Wallis Warfield, as she was again known.

== Personal and later life ==
He married, in 1909, Margaret Catharine (also known as Maggie), daughter of Lieutenant-Colonel J. Duke of the Indian Medical Service, and by her had two sons and two daughters.

Resigning his bishopric, he retired to York, where he died on 12 June 1957 aged seventy-seven. He was buried at Calverley, Yorkshire.

== Publications ==
Sourced from Who Was Who and his sketch in Crockford's Clerical Directory 1957–58.

- Studies in Apostolic Christianity (1909)
- Apologies of Justin Martyr (1911)
- Faith and the New Testament (1912)
- The Faith of the Catholic Church (1916)
- The Book of Acts (for the Clarendon Bible) (1922)
- Israel before Christ (World's Manuals series) (1924)
- The Book of Galatians (for Clarendon Bible) (1925)
- Israel in World-History (World's Manuals series) (1927)
- The Teaching of the Old Testament (1927)
- The Ancient World (1928)
- The Prophets of Israel (1929)
- The Gospel of Mark (for Clarendon Bible) (1929)
- C. of E., What does it Stand for? (1934)
- Grace and Morals (1935)
- The Gospels and the Critic (1936)
- Our Need for God (1937)
- God and Man (1937)
- The Faith of the New Testament (1939)
- For Beginners in Prayer (1941)
- The Goodly Fellowship (1942)
- What the Church Teaches (1942)
- The Trials of Sickness (1946)
- The Spirit of Life (1947)

== See also ==
- Robert Anderson Jardine § An unprecedented marriage
- Protestant Truth Society § Varied piety assessments of the Duke and Duchess of Windsor
- Telegraph & Argus § 1936 Abdication Crisis

Church of England titles
Preceded by Arthur Perowne	Bishop of Bradford; 1931–1955	Succeeded by Donald Coggan
