= E. A. H. Blunt =

British civil servant and scholarly writer (1877–1941)

E. A. H. Blunt KCIE OBE ICS
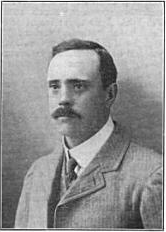
- Born: Edward Arthur Henry Blunt; 14 March 1877; Curepipe, Mauritius, British Empire
- Died: 29 May 1941 (aged 64); Fleet, Hampshire, England
- Relatives: Alfred Blunt (brother)

Sir Edward Arthur Henry Blunt, KCIE, OBE, ICS (14 March 1877 – 29 May 1941), was a British civil servant in India during the British Raj and a scholarly writer.

== Early life and education ==
Blunt was born in Curepipe on 14 March 1877, the son of Frances Theophilus Blunt, who later became the colonial Commissioner of the Seychelles. His younger brother was Alfred Walter Frank Blunt, an Anglican bishop. Blunt studied at Marlborough College, and then at Corpus Christi College, Oxford and University College London. He passed at the top of the list for the Indian Civil Service competitive examination after his fourth year at Oxford. He was one year at University College London, and proceeded to India to join the Indian Civil Service in 1901.

== Career ==
Blunt was appointed to the United Provinces, with his first service as Assistant Commissioner, Lucknow, and afterwards at Rae Bareli in the same capacity before officiating as Deputy Commissioner for a brief period. In 1904 he was transferred to Benares as Joint Magistrate. In 1905, he joined the Secretariat, having been appointed Under-Secretary in the Judicial Department. From 1910 to 1912, he served as Superintendent Census Operations for the 1911 Census of India and from 1918 to 1919 as Director of Civil Supplies in Cawnpore. Then he was Financial Secretary to Government in the United Provinces for eleven years (1920–1931). From 1931 to 1935, he served as a Member of the Executive Council of the Governor of the United Provinces, before he stepped down due to poor health.

In the 1919 Birthday Honours, he was made an Officer of the Most Excellent Order of the British Empire (OBE), in the 1922 New Year Honours a Companion of the Order of the Indian Empire (CIE) and in 1934 Birthday Honours a Knight Commander of the Order of the Indian Empire (KCIE).

After Blunt's retirement, he returned to England, where he spent the last few years of his life in Fleet. He died on 29 May 1941, aged 64.

== Publications ==
- Blunt, E. A. H. (1910). "The Tomb of John Mildenhall". The Journal of the Royal Asiatic Society of Great Britain and Ireland. 42 (2): 495–498. doi:10.1017/S0035869X00039757. JSTOR 25189697. S2CID 164097635.
- Blunt, E. A. H. (1911). List of Inscriptions on Christian Tombs and Tablets of Historical Interest in the United Provinces of Agra and Oudh. Allahabad.
- Blunt, E. A. H. (1931). The Caste System of Northern India with Special Reference to the United Provinces of Agra and Oudh. London: Oxford University Press.
- Blunt, E. A. H. (1937). The I.C.S.: The Indian Civil Service. London: Faber and Faber.
- Blunt, E. A. H., ed. (1938). Social Service in India: An Introduction to Some Social and Economic Problems of the Indian People. London: Her Majesty's Stationery Office.
  - Blunt, E. A. H. (1938). "Chapter I: The Environment and Distribution of the Indian People". In Blunt, E. A. H. (ed.). Social Service in India: An Introduction to Some Social and Economic Problems of the Indian People. London: Her Majesty's Stationery Office. pp. 1–41.
  - Blunt, E. A. H. (1938). "Chapter II: The Structure of the Indian People". In Blunt, E. A. H. (ed.). Social Service in India: An Introduction to Some Social and Economic Problems of the Indian People. London: Her Majesty's Stationery Office. pp. 42–77.
