= James Pulling =

British academic (1814–1879)

James Pulling (6 December 1814, Devon – 26 February 1879, Cambridge) was a British academic.

Pulling entered Corpus Christi College, Cambridge on 7 June 1833, where he was to spend the rest of his career. He graduated BA in 1837 and MA in 1840. In that year he was also ordained and became curate at Grantchester. He was Fellow of CCC from 1838 to 1850; and was Master from then until his death. He received the degree of Doctor of Divinity (DD). He also held the living at Belchamp St Paul from 1863.

Academic offices
Preceded by John Lamb	Master of Corpus Christi College, Cambridge; 1850–1879	Succeeded by Edward Perowne
Academic offices
Preceded by Richard Okes	Vice-Chancellor of the University of Cambridge; 1852–1853	Succeeded by Thomas Charles Geldart
