= Lancelot Perowne =

British Army officer (1902–1982)

Major-General Lancelot Perowne CB CBE
- Born: 11 June 1902; Kensington, London
- Died: 24 March 1982 (aged 79)
- Relatives: John Perowne (father); Sir Victor Perowne (brother)
- Military career
- Allegiance: United Kingdom
- Branch: British Army
- Service years: 1923–1955
- Rank: Major-General
- Nickname: "Lance"
- Service number: 23654
- Unit: Royal Engineers
- Commands: 17th Gurkha Division (1952–55); 151st Northumberland and Durham Light Infantry Brigade (1949–51); School of Combined Operations (1947–48); 72nd Indian Infantry Brigade (1946–47); 74th Indian Infantry Brigade (1945–46); 23rd Infantry Brigade (1943–45); 37th Anti-Aircraft Brigade (1943); 69th Anti-Aircraft Brigade (1942–43)
- Conflicts: Second World War; Malayan Emergency
- Awards: Companion of the Order of the Bath; Commander of the Order of the British Empire; Mentioned in Despatches; Order of the Star of Nepal, 2nd Class

Major-General Lancelot Edgar Connop Mervyn Perowne, CB, CBE (11 June 1902 – 24 March 1982) was a British Army officer who commanded the 17th Gurkha Division during the Malayan Emergency.

== Military career ==
The son of John Thomas Woolrych Perowne and Edith Marione Browne, Perowne was educated at Wellington College and the Royal Military Academy, Woolwich. He was commissioned into the Royal Engineers in 1923. Prior to the Second World War he was a searchlight specialist. During the war he served with the Commandos in France and then as commander of the 69th Anti-Aircraft Brigade from 1942, the 37th Anti-Aircraft Brigade in 1943 and then the Chindit-trained 23rd Infantry Brigade in India and Burma from later in 1943. He later claimed that, while stationed in Burma, he attached the severed, boiled head of a Japanese soldier to his knapsack to ward off snipers. As commander of the 23rd Brigade he fought a successful campaign in the Naga hills. He was present at the reoccupation of Malaya in 1945.

After the war Perowne became commander of the Penang Sub-Area and of the 74th Indian Infantry Brigade in Malaya. He was appointed commander of the 72nd Indian Infantry Brigade in 1946, Commandant of the School of Combined Operations in 1947, and commander of the 151st Northumberland and Durham Light Infantry Brigade in 1949. He went on to be Commander of the British Military Mission to Greece in 1951 and General Officer Commanding the South Malaya District and 17th Gurkha Division and Major General commanding the Brigade of Gurkhas in 1952 before he retired in 1955.

== Personal life ==
Perowne served as an adviser on military matters during the production of The Bridge on the River Kwai (1957).

Perowne married Johanne Stein in 1927. His brother was the British diplomat Victor Perowne, and his cousin the author and archaeologist Stewart Perowne.

Military offices
New command	GOC 17th Gurkha Division; 1952–1955	Succeeded by Richard Anderson
