= John Mildenhall =

British explorer and adventurer (c. 1560–1614)

John Mildenhall (c. 1560–1614) or John Midnall was an English explorer and adventurer and one of the first to make an overland journey to India. He was the self-styled ambassador of the British East India Company in India. His is the first recorded burial of an Englishman in India.

== Personal life ==
Little is known of John Mildenhall's early life. The date and location of his birth are unknown. In a letter written on 12 February 1599 he describes himself as John Mildenhall of London, Merchant. In the same letter, he likens the abundance of fish found at Lake Van (Turkey) to ..our herring time at Yermouth (Great Yarmouth, Norfolk, England), which he then describes.

In letters written by a contemporary merchant, John Sanderson, Mildenhall (more commonly called Midnall) is often referred to as a cuckold, inferring that he was a married man. Whether there was any issue from this marriage is not known; but Mildenhall did have two illegitimate children, in Persia, with an Indian woman. These two children (a boy and a girl) were left in the care of a Frenchman, named Augustin (the executor of Mildenhall's will), and Mildenhall bequeathed them his effects. The majority of Mildenhall's estate was eventually recovered by the East India Company, and the fate of the two children is unclear.

== Travels to India ==
Mildenhall was one of the first British travellers to journey overland to India. His name first appears in the Court Records of the British East India Company concerning a letter sent by him "to his master Rich Stapers, declaring what privileges he had obtained in the Indies and offering them, and his services to the Company for 1,500 pounds in hand". On 21 June 1608 the Court decided to consider his demand, and in October nominated Mildenhall as factor along with Lawrence Femell and Edward Abbott. However, Mildenhall demanded even more and as a consequence, negotiations came to an end.

Entrusted with the sale of the Company goods in the Levant, Mildenhall, travelled through Eastern Europe, passed through Scio and Smyrna, and reached Constantinople on 29 October 1599. After a six-month stay in Constantinople, he continued his journey and arrived at Aleppo on 24 May 1600 where he stayed for forty-two days. On 7 June 1600 Mildenhall left Aleppo with an entourage of six hundred people and, after travelling through Bir, Urfa, Diarbekir, Bitlis, Van, Nakhichevan, Julfa, Sultanieh, Kazvin, Kum, Kashan, Kerman, Sistan and Kandahar, he reached Lahore in 1603.

Mildenhall was entrusted with the sale of the company's goods in the Levant but he deceived the British East India Company by escaping to Persia instead. A letter from Ajmer dated 20 September 1614 informs the British East India Company that an Englishman named Richard Steele had arrived at Aleppo along with another Englishman, Richard Newman, in pursuit of one John Midnall who had tried to flee with the company's provisions to India but was overtaken and captured at Tombaz and taken back to Isfahan.

Mildenhall was released soon afterward, but his belongings were confiscated. However, he received compensation of 9,000 dollars in return. Shortly after his release, Mildenhall traveled to India and arrived in Lahore accompanied by Newman, who had had an altercation with Steele and had chosen to follow Mildenhall. They parted ways in Lahore but reunited in Agra.

In 1603, John Mildenhall reached the court of the Mughal Emperor Akbar and held discussions with him. However, he was regarded as an outlaw by the British East India Company whose exports to the Levant he had diverted to India. Moreover, his journey was not sponsored by the company. Hence, the British East India Company sent Sir William Hawkins to India in pursuit of Mildenhall and to declare all his dealings null and void.

== Burial ==
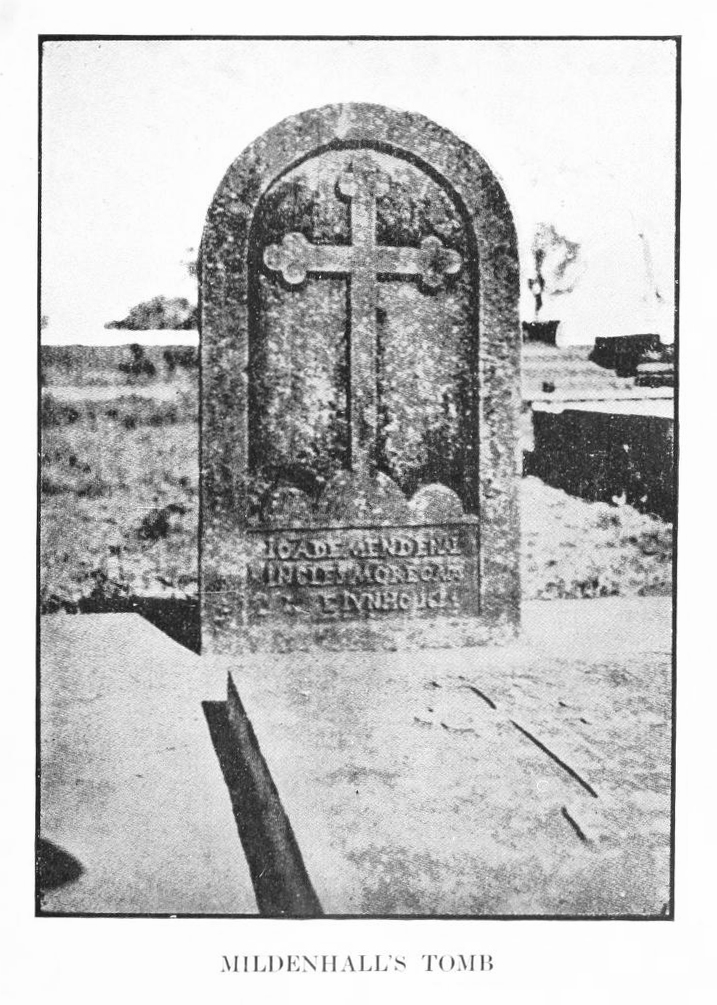
Mildenhall's tomb

John Mildenhall is interred at the Roman Catholic cemetery in Agra. Originally his grave had a Portuguese inscription which read "Joa de Mendenal, Ingles, moreo aos [unintelligible text] Junho 1614" (literally: Englishman, dead in June 1614). In the 20th century an English inscription was added, probably by the colonial English government:

Here lies John Mildenhall, Englishman, who left London in 1599 and traveling to India through Persian, reached Agra in 1603 and spoke with the Emperor Akbar. On a second visit in 1614 he fell ill at Lahore, died at Ajmer, and was buried here through the good offices of Thomas Kerridge merchant.

== Bibliography ==
- Blunt, E. A. H. (1910). "The Tomb of John Mildenhall". The Journal of the Royal Asiatic Society of Great Britain and Ireland. 42 (2): 495–498. doi:10.1017/S0035869X00039757. JSTOR 25189697. S2CID 164097635.
- Foster, William (1921). Early Travels in India: 1583-1619. London et al.: Oxford University Press. pp. 48–59.
- Prasad, Ram Chandra (1980). Early English Travellers in India: A Study in the Travel Literature of the Elizabethan and Jacobean Periods with Particular Reference to India (2 ed.). Delhi: Motilal Banarsidass. pp. 63–81. ISBN 978-81-208-2465-2.
