= 37th Anti-Aircraft Brigade =

37th Anti-Aircraft Brigade 63 (North London) Anti-Aircraft Brigade 33 Artillery Brigade
- Active: 1 May 1938–1967
- Country: United Kingdom
- Branch: Territorial Army
- Type: Anti-Aircraft Brigade; Artillery Brigade
- Role: Air Defence
- Part of: 6th AA Division; 2 AA Group; 1 AA Group; 9 AA Group
- Garrison/HQ: Edmonton; Shepherd's Bush
- Engagements: Battle of Britain; The Blitz; Baby Blitz; Operation Diver

Commanders
- Notable commanders: Brig Lancelot Perowne

The 37th Anti-Aircraft Brigade was an air defence formation of Britain's Territorial Army (TA) formed just before the outbreak of the Second World War. It was engaged in defending the Thames Estuary during the war, and continued to form part of Anti-Aircraft Command in the postwar era.

== Origin ==
6 AA Division's formation sign

As international tensions rose in the late 1930s, Britain's Anti-Aircraft (AA) defences were strengthened with new Royal Artillery (RA) regiments. 37th AA Brigade was raised on 1 May 1938, with its HQ at Edmonton in North London, to control some of these AA units in the London area. It was commanded by Brigadier Edward William Gravatt Wilson, MC, appointed 29 September 1938, who after he left in 1940 went on to be AA Defence Commander (AADC) Egypt. In 1939 37th AA Brigade joined the newly formed 6th AA Division based at Uxbridge, which had responsibility for air defence of the Thames Estuary, Essex and North Kent, and the approaches to London.

=== Order of Battle 1939 ===
On formation, 37th AA Bde had the following composition:

- 59th (The Essex Regiment) AA Regiment, RA – converted in 1935 from 5th Bn Essex Regiment
  - HQ at Walthamstow
  - 164th Anti-Aircraft Battery at Walthamstow
  - 167th Anti-Aircraft Battery at Leyton
  - 265th Anti-Aircraft Battery at Whipps Cross – newly-raised before 3 September 1939
- 61st (Middlesex) AA Regiment, RA – converted in 1935 from 11th Battalion, the London Regiment (Finsbury Rifles)
  - HQ at Pentonville
  - 170th Anti-Aircraft Battery at Finchley
  - 171st Anti-Aircraft Battery at Pentonville
  - 195th Anti-Aircraft Battery at Finchley – newly-raised before 3 September 1939
- 79th (Hertfordshire Yeomanry) AA Regiment, RA – converted in 1938 from 343 (Watford) Field Battery from 86th (East Anglian) (Hertfordshire Yeomanry) Field Regt, RA)
  - HQ at Watford
  - 246th (1st Watford) Anti-Aircraft Battery
  - 247th (2nd Watford) Anti-Aircraft Battery
  - 248th (Welwyn) Anti-Aircraft Battery at Welwyn Garden City
- 82nd (Essex) AA Regiment, RA – raised in 1938
  - HQ at Barking
  - 156th (Barking) Anti-Aircraft Battery – transferred from 52nd (London) AA Regiment, RA
  - 193rd Anti-Aircraft Battery at Leigh-on-Sea –transferred from 59th (Essex) AA Regiment
  - 256th (Barking) Anti-Aircraft Battery – newly raised before 3 September 1939
- 37th AA Bde Company Royal Army Service Corps

== Mobilisation ==
Anti-Aircraft Command, which had been formed within the Territorial Army earlier in the year, mobilised in late August 1939 and was at its stations before war was declared on 3 September. By then, a further newly formed regiment had been added to 37th AA Bde's order of battle:

- 90th AA Regiment, RA
  - HQ at Southgate, London
  - 272nd Anti-Aircraft Battery
  - 284th Anti-Aircraft Battery
  - 285th Anti-Aircraft Battery

== Phoney War ==
37th AA Bde deployed and operated a layout from Dagenham to Thorpe Bay in Essex, along the north side of the Thames Estuary, known as 'Thames North'. Thames North had a planned layout of 20 HAA sites, of which only half were occupied by September 1940. It also contained a number of Vital Points (VPs) where LAA guns were deployed, including Purfleet (ammunition stores, including the entire AA ammunition supply for the London area), Tilbury (docks), Thameshaven and Coryton Refinery (oil refineries), and a major fighter airfield at RAF Hornchurch. All equipment was short, especially 40 mm Bofors guns for the LAA sites: Purfleet started the war with one quadruple Vickers gun, later receiving five Bofors batteries.

Opportunities for action were rare during the Phoney War, but on the night of 22/23 November 1939 the HAA guns of 37 AA Bde ('Thames North') combined with those of 28 (Thames & Medway) AA Bde on the other bank of the river ('Thames South') to engage at least two enemy mine-laying aircraft that had strayed into the mouth of the Estuary. One wrecked aircraft was found on the marshes.

On 26 December 1939, 79th (Hertfordshire Yeomanry) HAA Rgt was ordered to prepare to proceed overseas as a Base Defence Regiment for the British Expeditionary Force. The regiment was withdrawn from AA Command on 16 January 1940 and in February and March it was deployed around Le Havre. A fortnight after the Dunkirk evacuation, the regiment was evacuated from St Nazaire. It did not return to 37 AA Bde.

In April 1940, 82nd (Essex) AA Rgt was detached from the brigade and served in the Norway Campaign; after evacuation from Norway it was sent to join the garrison of Gibraltar.

In the summer of 1940, all the RA units equipped with the older 3-inch or newer 3.7-inch AA guns were designated as Heavy AA (HAA) regiments to distinguish them from the newer Light AA (LAA) regiments appearing in the order of battle.

== Battle of Britain ==
By 11 July 1940, the Thames North AA layout operated by 37 AA Bde had a total of 46 HAA guns (3.7-inch and 4.5-inch).

The brigade was heavily engaged throughout the Battle of Britain. On 22 August, for example, a mass raid flew up the Thames Estuary to attack RAF Hornchurch on the Essex shore: the raid was broken up by 37 and 28 AA Bdes, and then the fighters of No. 11 Group RAF attacked. Follow-up raids were marked for the fighters by 'pointer' rounds of HAA fire. On 2 September another mass raid arrived over the Medway and flew up the Thames towards Hornchurch. They came under heavy fire from the 3.7s and 4.5s of 28 and 37 AA Bdes and 15 were shot down before the fighters took over. On 7 September heavy raids up the estuary attacked oil wharves at Thameshaven, Tilbury Docks and Woolwich Arsenal: a total of 25 aircraft were destroyed by AA guns and fighters.

On 15 September, remembered as the climax of the battle, 220 bombers attacked London in the morning despite heavy casualties inflicted by the RAF fighters. More attacks came in the afternoon and the AA guns around London, particularly 37 AA Bde, were continuously in action. Between the guns and fighters, the Luftwaffe lost 85 aircraft that day, an unsustainable rate of loss.

== The Blitz ==
After 15 September the intensity of Luftwaffe day raids declined rapidly, and it began a prolonged night bombing campaign over London and industrial towns (The Blitz). This meant that 37 AA Bde was in action night after night as the bomber streams approached the London Inner Artillery Zone, but even with the assistance of searchlights (S/Ls), the effectiveness of HAA fire and fighters was greatly diminished in the darkness.

=== Order of Battle 1940–41 ===
During the Battle of Britain and subsequent London Blitz, 37 AA Bde had the following order of battle.

- 59 HAA Rgt – as above; to 28 AA Bde summer 1941
- 61 HAA Rgt – as above; left summer 1941
- 75th (Home Counties) (Cinque Ports) HAA Rgt, RA (part) – converted in 1938 from 59th (Home Counties) (Cinque Ports) Field Rgt, RA; to 10th AA Division Spring 1941; rejoined summer 1941
  - HQ at Dover
  - 223rd (Kent) HAA Battery
  - 224th (Cinque Ports) HAA Battery
  - 306th HAA Battery
  - 422 HAA Bty joined in Summer 1941
- 121st HAA Rgt, RA – joined after February 1941; to 29 (East Anglian) AA Bde May 1941
  - 385 HAA Bty
  - 387, 388 HAA Btys – attached direct to 37 AA Bde
- 17th LAA Rgt, RA – to 12th AA Division Autumn 1941
  - HQ at Chelsea, London
  - 48th LAA Battery at Chelsea
  - 49th LAA Battery at Purfleet
  - 50th LAA Battery at Shellhaven
- 2nd LAA Rgt, Royal Canadian Artillery – attached from 1st Canadian Division assembling in the UK
- 5th LAA Rgt, RCA – attached by February 1941, before joining 4th Canadian Division

== Mid-War ==
The Blitz ended in May 1941, but occasional raids continued. Newly-formed AA units joined the division, the HAA units increasingly being 'mixed' ones into which women of the Auxiliary Territorial Service were integrated. At the same time, experienced units were posted away for service overseas. By December 1941, 37 AA Bde only had 75 HAA Rgt under its command. However, 29 (East Anglian) AA Bde, which had controlled 6 AA Division's S/L and LAA units in Essex, was disbanded in February 1942 and 37 AA Bde took over its responsibilities as far north as The Naze. This continual turnover of units, which accelerated in 1942 with the preparations for Operation Torch and the need to relocate guns to counter the Baedeker Blitz and the Luftwaffe's hit-and-run attacks against South Coast towns.

A reorganisation of AA Command in October 1942 saw the AA divisions disbanded and replaced by a number of AA Groups more closely aligned with the groups of RAF Fighter Command. 6 AA Division merged into 2 AA Group covering South East England outside the London Inner Artillery Zone and cooperating with No. 11 Group.

=== Order of Battle 1941–43 ===
During this period the brigade was composed as follows (temporary attachments omitted):

- 71st (Forth) HAA Rgt – from 29 AA Bde May 1942; left July 1942, later to Operation Torch
  - 227, 229, 327 HAA Btys
- 75th HAA Rgt – left for Persia and Iraq Command (PAIFORCE) April 1942
  - 223, 233, 306 HAA Btys
  - 422 HAA Bty – to 127th HAA Rgt, 28 AA Bde, April 1942
- 84th HAA Rgt – joined Spring 1942; to 56 AA Bde August 1942
  - 260, 262, 263 HAA Btys
- 86th (Honourable Artillery Company) HAA Rgt – joined August 1942; to Home Forces December 1942
  - 273, 274, 383, 446 HAA Btys
- 102nd HAA Rgt– joined August 1942; left for Middle East Forces (MEF) early 1943
  - 314, 315, 316 HAA Btys
- 104th HAA Rgt – joined April 1942; to Sicily (Operation Husky) early 1943
  - 328, 329, 336 HAA Btys
  - 452 HAA Bty – joined June 1942; left July 1942
- 121st HAA Rgt – joined April 1943
  - 385, 387, 388 HAA Btys
- 124th HAA Rgt – joined early 1943, left May 1943
  - 219, 410, 412, 415 HAA Btys
- 131st HAA Rgt – joined July 1942, to 4 AA Division August 1942
  - 310, 376, 368, 428 HAA Btys
- 167th (Mixed) HAA Rgt – new unit formed August, joined September 1942
  - 464, 562 HAA Btys
  - 610, 639 HAA Btys – joined early 1943
- 4th (Ulster) LAA Rgt – joined June 1942; unbrigaded October 1942, later to 27th (Home Counties) AA Bde
  - 7, 8, 10 LAA Boys
  - 11 LAA Bty – left July 1942
- 31st LAA Rgt – joined June 1942; unbrigaded August 1942, later to Operation Husky
  - 61, 101, 224 LAA Boys
  - 447 LAA Bty – left July 1942
- 86th LAA Rgt – joined from 56 AA Bde April 1942; to MEF December 1942
  - 55, 119, 281, 475 LAA Btys
- 140th LAA Rgt – new unit formed July joined August 1942; left early 1943
  - 367, 457, 459, 464 LAA Btys
- 143rd LAA Rgt – new unit formed October, joined early 1943
  - 403, 410, 413, 484 LAA Btys
- 28th (Essex) S/L Rgt – from 29 AA Bde Spring 1942, to 56 AA Bde June 1942
  - 309, 311, 312, 438 S/L Btys

== Late War ==
In 1943 Brig Lancelot Perowne transferred from 69 AA Bde to take command of 37 AA Bde. He was a searchlight specialist from the Royal Engineers. In November 1943 he was sent to India to take over 23rd Infantry Brigade, which was training for Chindit operations, and commanded it in the Burma Campaign.

=== Order of Battle 1943–44 ===
In the summer of 1943, 37 AA Bde came under the command of 1 AA Group, which now controlled the 'Thames North' defences. It gave up its existing regiments and acquired new ones from within 1 AA Group, so that by early September it had the following order of battle.

- 184th (Mixed) HAA Rgt
  - 616, 617, 625, 627 HAA Btys
- 6th (Mixed) AA 'Z' Regiment
  - 123, 145, 179, 187 Z Btys
  - 221 Z Bty – left by April 1944

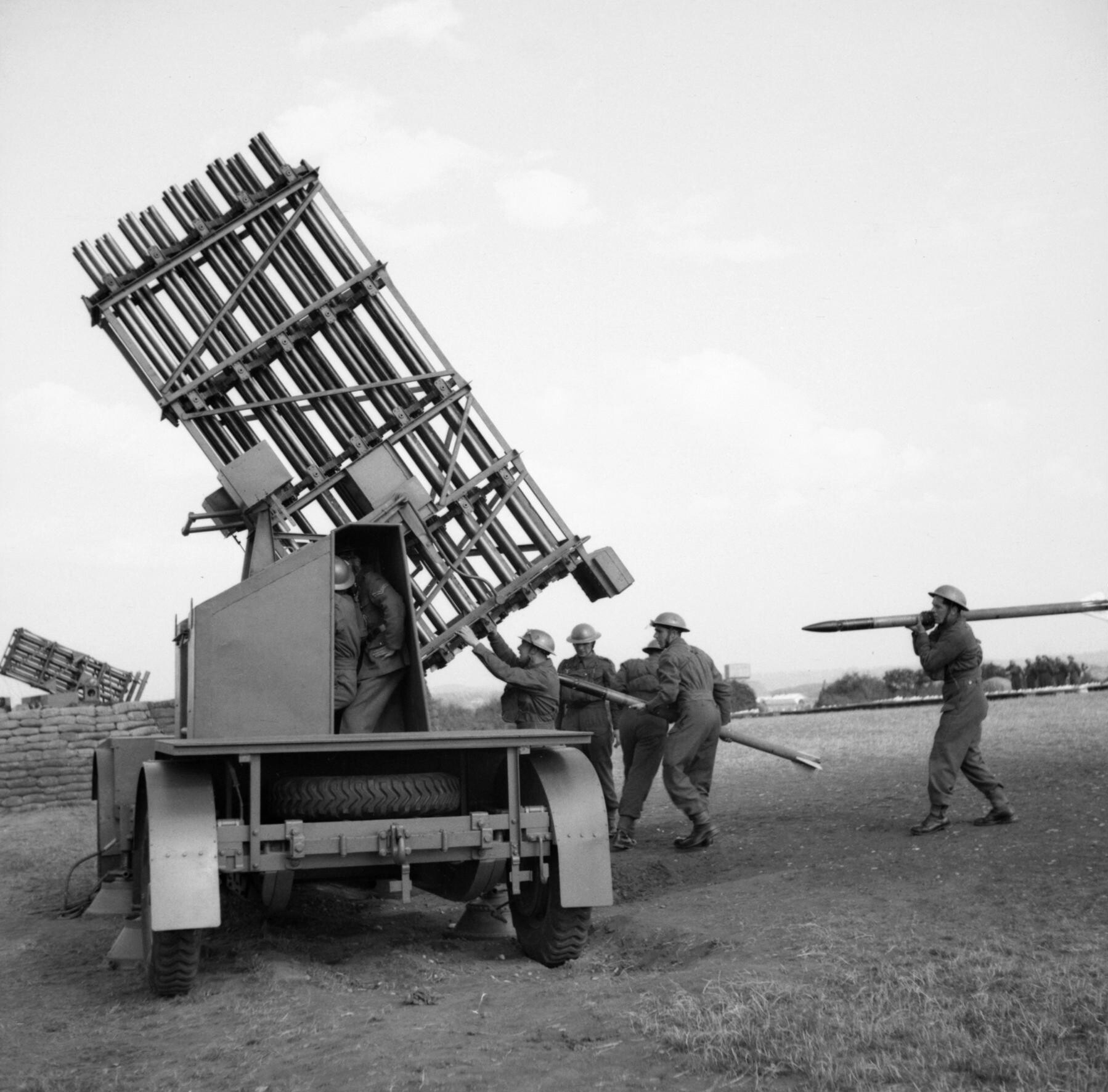
Loading a mobile multiple 4-inch Z projector.

'Z' Regiments were equipped with Z Battery rocket launchers; in April 1944 they were renamed AA Area Mixed Rgts.

There were few changes in the brigade's order of battle over the next year:

- 167th (M) HAA Rgt – returned May 1944
  - 464, 562, 610 HAA Btys
- 137th LAA Rgt – joined January 1944
  - 326 LAA Bty – 26 (London) AA Bde May 1944
  - 376 LAA Bty
  - 462, 468 LAA Btys – left by March 1944
  - 205, 420 LAA Btys – joined May 1944

By March 1944 AA Command was being forced to release manpower for the planned Allied invasion of continental Europe (Operation Overlord), and a number of units and subunits were disbanded.

== Operation Diver ==
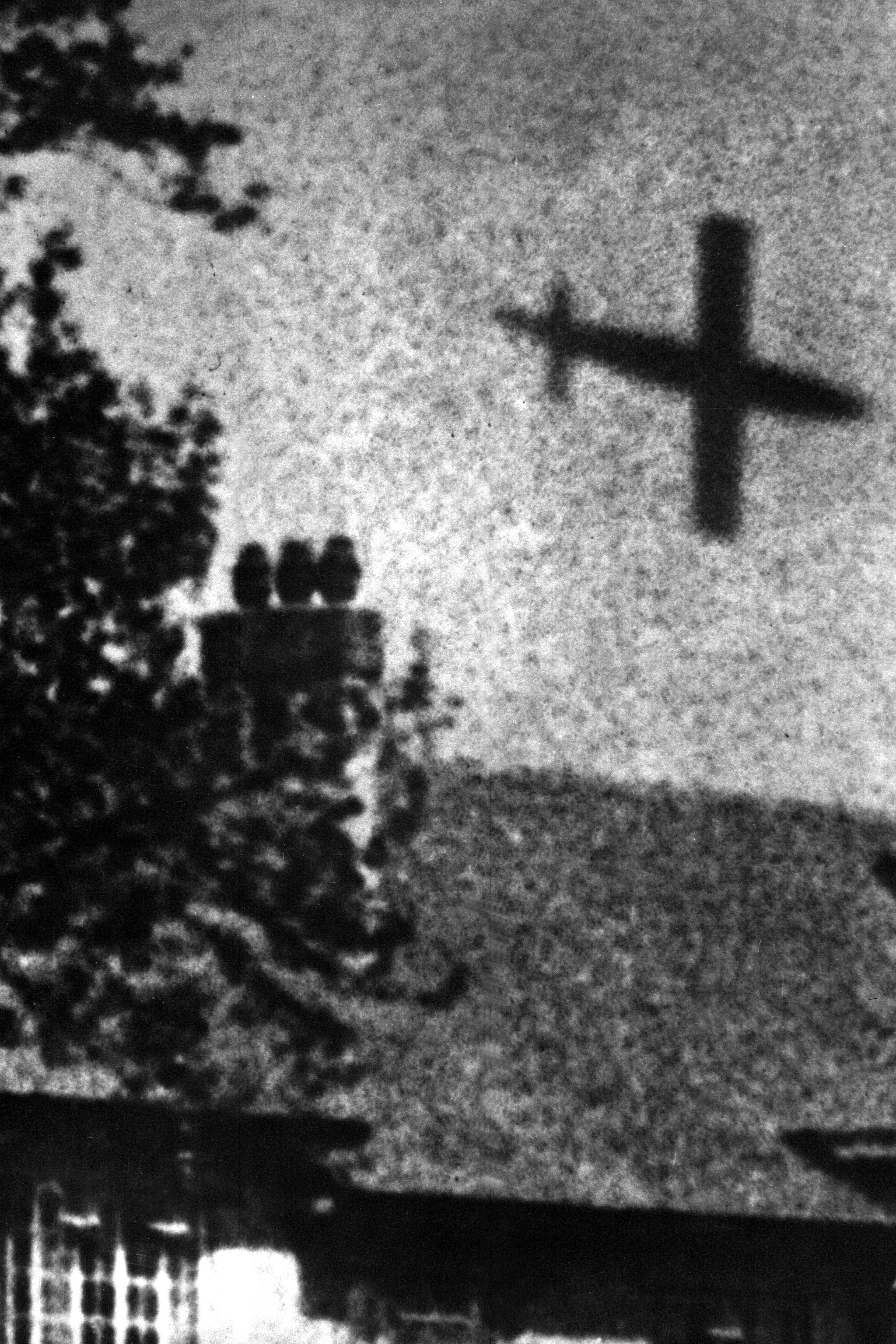
V-1 falling over London, 1944.

The Luftwaffe began a new bombing campaign against London in early 1944 (the Baby Blitz). By now the night fighter defences, the London Inner Artillery Zone (IAZ) and Thames Estuary defences were well organised and the attackers suffered heavy losses for relatively small results. More significant were the V-1 flying bombs, codenamed 'Divers', which began to be launched against London from Northern France soon after D-Day. These presented AA Command's biggest challenge since the Blitz. Defences had been planned against this new form of attack (Operation Diver), but it presented a severe problem for AA guns, and after two weeks' experience AA Command carried out a major reorganisation, stripping guns from the London IAZ and other parts of the UK and repositioning them along the South Coast to target V-1s coming in over the English Channel, where a 'downed' V-1 would cause no damage. As the launching sites were overrun by 21st Army Group, the Luftwaffe switched to air-launching V-1s over the North Sea, so 1 AA Group had to redeploy again to the east of London.

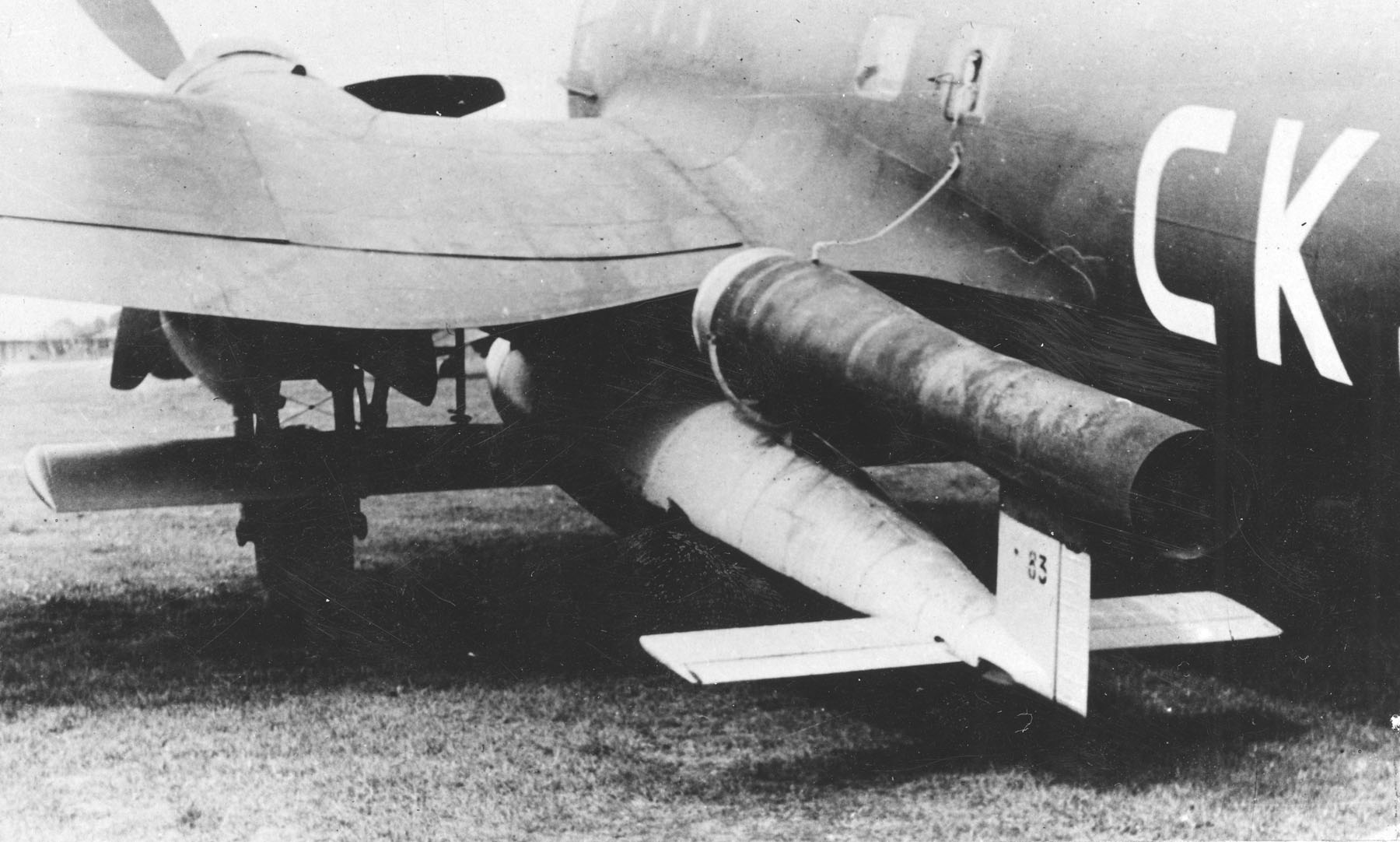
V-1 slung under the wing of a Heinkel He 111 bomber.

New HAA sites had to be quickly established, with static guns mounted on ingenious 'Pile Platforms' (named after the commander of AA Command, Sir Frederick Pile) and thousands of huts moved and re-erected to shelter the crews as winter approached. AA Command formed a new 9 AA Group to take over the 'Diver' defences in East Anglia and 37 AA Bde moved to this new formation in December 1944. At this time, its order of battle was:

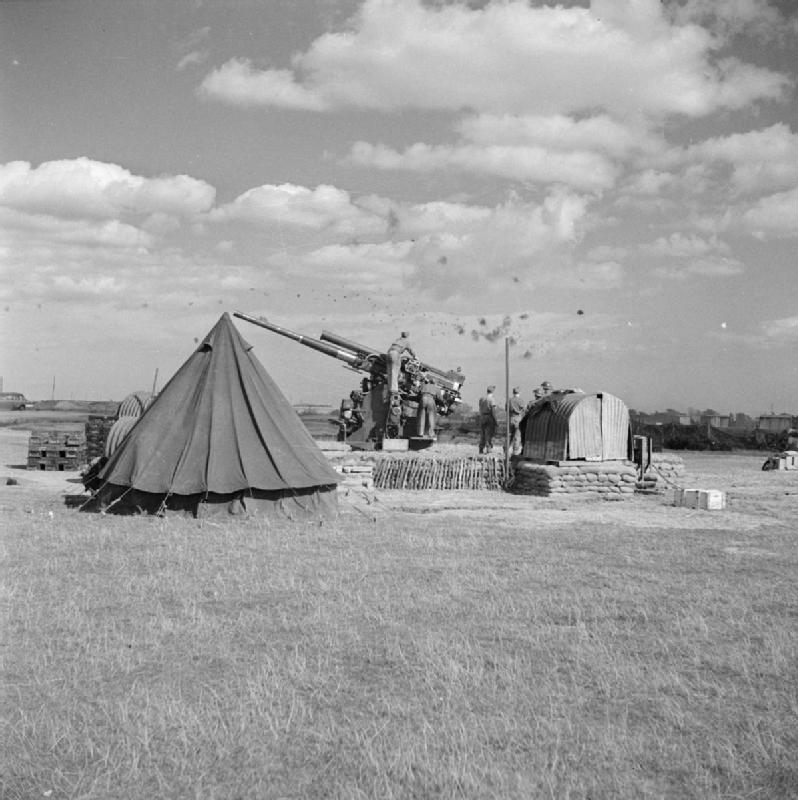
3.7-inch HAA battery in action near London 29 August 1944

=== Order of Battle 1944–45 ===
- 82nd (Essex) HAA Rgt – rejoined December 1944
  - 156, 193, 228 (Edinburgh), 256 HAA Btys
- 124th HAA Rgt – rejoined March 1945
  - 219, 410, 412 HAA Btys
- 142nd (M) HAA Rgt – joined September 1944
  - 477, 488, 534 HAA Btys
  - 464 HAA Bty – joined November 1944
- 154th (M) HAA Rgt – joined February 1945
  - 522, 526, 539 HAA Btys
- 155th (M) HAA Rgt – joined September, left December 1944
  - 525, 531, 537, 579 HAA Btys
- 157th HAA Rgt – joined February, left March 1945
  - 415, 430, 438 HAA Btys
- 159th (M) HAA Rgt – joined February 1945
  - 529, 542, 534 HAA Btys
- 167th (M) HAA Rgt – left November 1944
  - 464, 562, 610 HAA Btys
- 184th (M) HAA Rgt – left February 1945
  - 616, 617, 625 HAA Btys
  - 627 HAA Bty – left December 1944

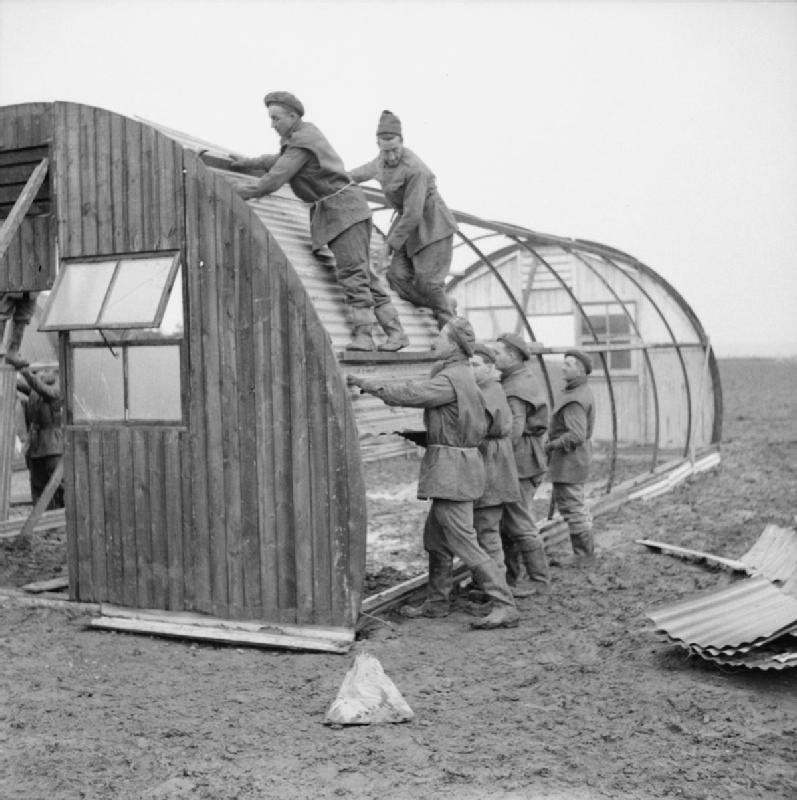
A Nissen hut being erected at an AA site, November 1944.

- 189th HAA Rgt – joined February 1945
  - 413, 434, 440 HAA Btys
- 197th HAA Rgt – joined November 1944; left February 1945
  - 603, 604, 605 HAA Btys
- 81st LAA Rgt – joined October 1944; left February 1945
  - 199, 261 LAA Btys
- 97th LAA Rgt – joined October 1944; left February 1945
  - 232, 301, 480 LAA Boys
- 131st LAA Rgt – joined February, left April 1945
  - 432, 433, 434 LAA Btys
- 137th LAA Rgt – left December 1944
  - 205, 376, 420 LAA Boys
- 6th AA Area Mixed Rgt – to 26 (London) AA Bde August 1944

By October 1944, the brigade's HQ establishment was 9 officers, 8 male other ranks and 25 members of the ATS, together with a small number of attached drivers, cooks and mess orderlies (male and female). In addition, the brigade had a Mixed Signal Office Section of 1 officer, 5 male other ranks and 19 ATS, which was formally part of the Group signal unit.

After VE Day, 9 AA Group was disbanded and 37 AA Bde returned to 1 AA Group. AA Command was rapidly run down and many units disbanded as men and women were demobilised. By late June 1945, 37 AA Bde's order of battle was as follows:

- 4th HAA Rgt – returned from North Africa
  - 5, 6, 258 HAA Btys
- 82nd (Essex) HAA Rgt
  - 156, 193, 228, 256 HAA Btys
- 124th HAA Rgt
  - 219, 410, 412 HAA Btys
- 143rd (M) HAA Rgt
  - 494, 495 HAA Btys

== Postwar ==
When the TA was reconstituted on 1 January 1947, 37 AA Bde's Regular Army units reformed 11 AA Bde at Shoeburyness, while the TA portion was renumbered as 63 (North London) AA Brigade, (Note: The TA AA brigades were now numbered 51 and upwards, rather than 26 and upwards as in the 1930s; the wartime 63rd AA Bde was reorganised as 16 AA Bde.) with its HQ at London NW1 (still in 1 AA Group), with the following composition:

- 461 (Mobile) HAA Rgt (Middlesex) – the former 61st (Middlesex) HAA Rgt, see above
- 479 (Mobile) (Hertfordshire Yeomanry) HAA Rgt – the former 79th (Hertfordshire Yeomanry) HAA Rgt, see above, transferred from 82 AA Bde
- 484 (Mixed) HAA Rgt (Middlesex) – the former 84th (Middlesex, London Transport) HAA Rg, see above
- 490 (Mixed) HAA Rgt (Middlesex) – the former 90th HAA Rgt, see above

When AA Command was disbanded in 1955, all of 63 AA Bde's units were also disbanded, but the brigade HQ was retained, first designated as X AA Bde, then redesignated as 33 AA Bde, with its HQ at Shepherd's Bush. (Note: It had no connection with the wartime 33rd (Western) AA Bde based on Merseyside.) It had the following composition:

- 452 (London) HAA Rgt – the former 52nd (London) HAA Rgt
- 459 (Essex) HAA Rgt – the former 59th (Essex Regiment) HAA Rgt, see above'
- 284 (1st East Anglian) LAA Rgt
- 512 (Finsbury Rifles) LAA Rgt – descended from the former 61st (Middlesex) HAA Rgt', see above
- 517 (Essex) LAA Rgt – the former 17th LAA Rgt, see above'
- 571 (9th Bn Middlesex Regiment) LAA Rgt

It may have formed part of London District.

On 1 May 1961, 33 AA Bde was amalgamated with HQ 56th (London) Infantry Division as 33 Artillery Brigade. It was disbanded when the TA was reduced in 1967.

== Preserved sites ==
As an example of the defences operated under 37 AA Bde, HAA site TN13 (Thames North 13) still survives at Bowaters Farm, about 1200 yards (1100 m) from the coastal defence battery at Coalhouse Fort, East Tilbury. It was begun in August 1939 as a sandbag battery for mobile 3.7-inch guns. By mid-1940 this had been replaced by four permanent emplacements for 4.5-inch guns. Later in the war four further emplacements for radar-controlled 5.25-inch guns were added. The HAA guns were supported by an AA searchlight and sound-locator stationed on the jetty at Coalhouse Fort. This exposed position was defended by a Lewis gun, but was frequently strafed by enemy fighters. A second AA searchlight was positioned on the old river wall near the north caponier of Coalhouse Fort. (There were separate searchlights installed at the fort to direct the coastal guns.)

== Memorial ==
There is a memorial to 37 AA Bde at St Augustine's Church, Thorpe Bay, Southend-on-Sea, which reads:

TO COMMEMORATE/ THE ASSOCIATION WITH THIS CHURCH OF THE/ OFFICERS, NON-COMMISSIONED OFFICERS AND/ OTHER RANKS OF THE ROYAL REGIMENT OF/ ARTILLERY AND THE AUXILIARY TERRITORIAL/ SERVICE FROM THE GUNSITE NEARBY WHICH WAS/ MANNED CONTINUOUSLY BY PERSONNEL FROM/ THE 37TH ANTI-AIRCRAFT BRIGADE THROUGHOUT/ THE WORLD WAR 1939 - 1945

== External sources ==
- British Army units from 1945 on
- British Military History
- Generals of World War II
- Orders of Battle at Patriot Files
- The Royal Artillery 1939–45
- UK War Memorials Archive
