= John Perowne (army officer) =

British Army officer (1863–1954)

John Thomas Woolrych Perowne VD, TD (1 June 1863 – 27 April 1954) was a British Army officer, a King's Messenger and a Gold Staff Officer at the Coronation of King George VI in 1937.

== Biography ==
Born in Lampeter in Wales in 1863, the eldest son of Anna Maria (née Woolrych) and the Right Reverend John James Stewart Perowne, the Vice-Principal of St David’s College, Lampeter, John Perowne attended Haileybury School before going to Corpus Christi College, Cambridge in 1882 where he obtained a B.A. in 1885 and an M.A. in 1889. He played cricket for the College side in 1885.

By 1889 Perowne was a lieutenant in the 1st Volunteer Battalion of the Northamptonshire Regiment and by 1894 was a captain. In 1898 his book Russian Hosts and English Guests in Central Asia was published by Scientific Press. In 1901 he was a Director of Samuel Allsopp & Sons in Burton upon Trent. In March 1902 he was appointed an Esquire of the Order of the Hospital of Saint John of Jerusalem in England, and in 1903 he was awarded the Volunteer Officers' Decoration (VD). He contested unsuccessfully as a Liberal Unionist seats in the South Molton Division of Devon (January and December 1910) and the Isle of Wight (1922).

In 1911 Perowne was listed as a lieutenant colonel in the Volunteer Force, and served in World War I as a lieutenant-colonel in the Royal Field Artillery (Territorial Force). From 1919 to 1921 he was an Acting King’s Messenger and was one of the 250 Gold Staff Officers who assisted at the Coronation of King George VI in 1937. He was awarded the Territorial Decoration (TD) in 1930, and served in the Home Guard from 1940 to 1942. In addition, he was Registrar and Knight of Justice of the Order of St John of Jerusalem (1926-1933), a Knight Hospitaller in the same Order (1933-1946), a Member of the Executive Committee of the British Red Cross Society and the Order of St. John War Organisation, Chairman of the Joint Council Finance Committee (1928-1945), and Vice Chairman of the Samaritan Hospital for Women in Nottingham.

== Family ==
With his wife Edith Marione (née Browne) (born 1874), whom he married in 1896 at St George Hanover Square in London he had four children: John Victor Thomas Woolrych Tait Perowne (1897-1951), Rosabelle Maud Iona Charlotte Perowne (1899-1987), Lancelot Edgar Connop Mervyn Perowne (1902-1982) and Christopher Terence Reginald Cuthbert Perowne (1904-1973). A nephew was the British diplomat, archaeologist, explorer and historian Stewart Perowne.

John Thomas Woolrych Perowne died in London in 1954 aged 90.
