= Humphry William Woolrych =

English lawyer, legal writer and biographer

Humphry William Woolrych (1795–1871) was an English lawyer, known as a legal writer and biographer.

== Life ==
He was the son of Humphry Cornewall Woolrych and Elizabeth, elder daughter of William Bentley of Red Lion Square, London, and was born at Southgate, Middlesex, on 24 September 1795. He was educated at Eton College, and matriculated at St. Edmund Hall, Oxford, on 14 December 1816, but did not take a degree. He was admitted student at Lincoln's Inn on 24 November 1819, and called to the bar in 1821. In 1830 he was called ad eundem at the Inner Temple; he was admitted at Gray's Inn on 13 July 1847, and in 1855 he was created serjeant-at-law.

Woolrych lived at Croxley Green, where his father had bought an estate and at 9 Petersham Terrace, Kensington. He died at Kensington on 2 July 1871, and was buried in Rickmansworth cemetery.

== Works ==
Woolrych as serjeant-at-law wrote about the degree, soon to be abolished:

- Remarks on the Rank of Queen's Serjeant, 1866;
- The Bar of England and the Serjeant-at-law, 1867; and
- Lives of Eminent Serjeants-at-law, 1869, in two volumes.

His legal textbooks and tracts were:

- Rights of Common, 1824; 2nd edit. 1850.
- Law of Certificates, 1826.
- Law of Ways, 1829; 2nd edit. 1847.
- Commercial and Mercantile Law of England, 1829.
- Law of Waters and Sewers, 1830; 2nd edit. 1851.
- History and Results of Present Capital Punishments in England, 1832.
- Our Island: a Novel [anon.], 1832, 3 vols.
- Four Letters on Bill for General Registry of Deeds, 1833.
- Law of Window Lights, 1833.
- New Highways Act, 2nd edit. 1836.
- Treatise on Criminal Statutes of 7 Will. IV & 1 Vict. 1837.
- New Inclosure Act, 1837; with notes and indexes, 1846.
- Treatise on Misdemeanours, 1842.
- Law of Party Walls and Fences, including the New Metropolitan Buildings Act, 1845.
- Treatise on Sewers and Drainage Acts; 2nd edit. 1849; 3rd edit. 1864.
- Public Health Act, 1849.
- Legal Time, its Computations and Reckonings, 1851.
- Metropolitan Building Act, 1856; 2nd edit. 1877; 3rd edit. 1882.
- Game Laws, 1858.
- Criminal Law as amended by Statutes of 1861, 1862.
- Private Executions, 1867.

Woolrych also wrote:

- Winter: a Poem, 1824, which was inspired by Thomson's Seasons.
- A Series of Lord Chancellors, Keepers, and other Legal Officers from Queen Elizabeth until the Present Day, 1826.
- The Life of Sir Edward Coke, 1826; and
- Memoirs of the Life of Judge Jeffreys, 1827.

He published in 1842 a second edition of Charles Penruddocke's Short Analysis of the Criminal Law of England, was a contributor to the Globe and Traveller, and read papers to the Law Amendment Society.

== Family ==
Woolrych married, on 3 July 1817, at Abbot's Langley, Hertfordshire, Penelope, youngest daughter of Francis Bradford of Great Westwood, Hertfordshire. She died at 9 Petersham Terrace on 23 September 1876, aged 76, and was also buried at Rickmansworth.

They had issue three sons and four daughters. His third daughter, Anna Maria Raikea, married, on 2 July 1862, John James Stewart Perowne.

== Notes ==
Attribution

This article incorporates text from a publication now in the public domain: Lee, Sidney, ed. (1900). "Woolrych, Humphry William". Dictionary of National Biography. Vol. 62. London: Smith, Elder & Co.
