= Edward Plumptre =

English theologian and scholar (1821–1891)

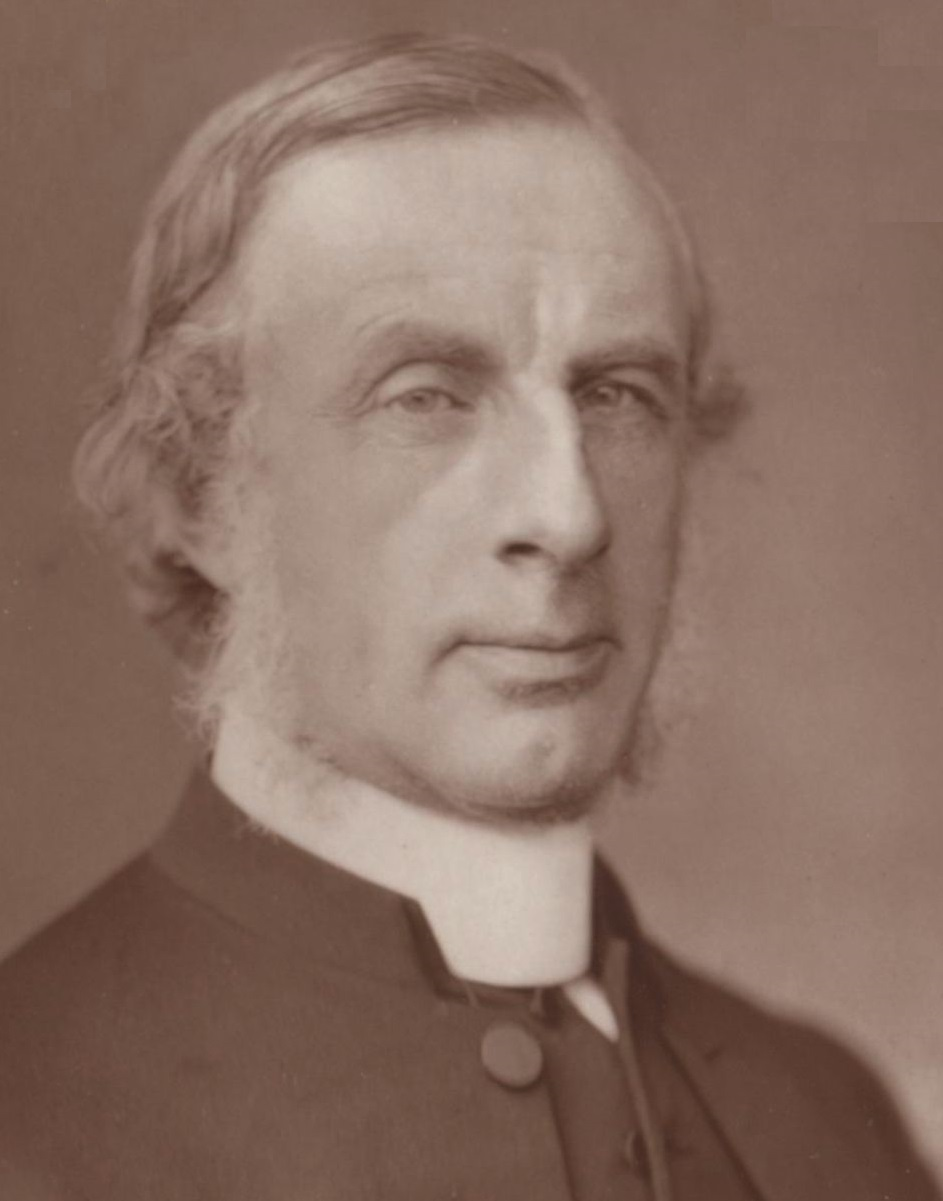
Edward Hayes Plumptre

Edward Hayes Plumptre (6 August 1821 – 1 February 1891) was an English divine and scholar born in London.

== Life ==
He was born on 6 August 1821, being the son of Edward Hallows Plumptre, a London solicitor. Charles John Plumptre was his brother. He was educated at home, and after a brief stay at King's College, London, entered Oxford as a scholar of University College, Oxford, of which his uncle, Frederick Charles Plumptre (1796–1870), was master from 1836 till his death. In 1844, he took a double first-class, alone in mathematics, and in classics with Sir George Bowen, Dean Bradley, and E. Poste. He was elected to a fellowship at Brasenose College, which he resigned three years afterwards, on his marriage with Harriet Theodosia, sister of Frederick Denison Maurice. For some years the influence of his brother-in-law was apparent in his religious views, but as he advanced in life he identified himself with no party.

== Service ==
He was ordained in 1847, by Bishop Wilberforce, he proceeded M.A. in 1847, and joined the staff of King's College London. There his work mainly lay for twenty-one years, and he enlarged the scope of the institution by introducing evening classes. From 1847 to 1868, he was chaplain there, from 1853 to 1863 professor of pastoral theology, and from 1864 to 1881 professor of exegesis. He proved a most sympathetic teacher, and took a genuine interest in the future welfare of his pupils.

Plumptre also took a leading part in promoting the higher education of women as a professor of Queen's College, Harley Street, where he held the office of principal during the last two years of his work there (1875–77).

Throughout this period he was also occupied in clerical work. From 1851 to 1858, he was assistant preacher at Lincoln's Inn, and in 1863 prebendary of St. Paul's. He was rector of Pluckley from 1869 and of Bickley from 1873. He was Boyle lecturer in 1866, and the lectures were afterwards published under the title of 'Christ and Christendom.' From 1869 to 1874, he was a member of the Old Testament revision committee, and from 1872 to 1874 Grinfield lecturer and examiner at Oxford.

In 1881, he resigned his work in London on becoming dean of Wells. He was an ideal dean, possessing a genuine talent for business, and being always ready to consider the suggestions of others; not only the cathedral and the Theological College, but the city of Wells, its hospital, its almshouse, and its workhouse, commanded his service.

Plumptre died on 1 February 1891 at the deanery of Wells, and was buried in the cathedral cemetery beside his wife, who had died on 3 April 1889. The marriage was childless.

== Published works ==
Meanwhile, his pen was never idle. He wrote much on the interpretation of scripture, endeavouring to combine and popularise, in no superficial fashion, the results attained by labourers in special sections of the subject. He contributed to the commentaries known respectively as the Cambridge Bible, the Speaker's Commentary, the commentary edited by Charles Ellicott, (Note: Plumptre's contributions to Ellicott's Commentary covered Isaiah, Jeremiah and Lamentations, the Gospels of Matthew, Mark and Luke, the Acts of the Apostles, and the Epistle of Jude.) and the Bible Educator (serial from 1873 to 1875). He also wrote Biblical Studies (1870, 3rd edit. 1885), St. Paul in Asia (1877), a Popular Exposition of the Epistles to the Seven Churches (1877 and 1879), Movements in Religious Thought: Romanism, Protestantism, Agnosticism (1879), and Theology and Life (1884). His most remarkable theological work was The Spirits in Prison, and other studies on Life after Death (1884 and 1885). The book comprises a review of previous teaching on the subject of eschatology. His characteristic sympathy with 'the larger hope' is moderated throughout by a characteristic caution. He had passed beyond the influence of Maurice, and, though his loyal admiration for his earlier teacher remained unchanged, he had rejected his conclusions.

In 1888, he issued a little work on Wells Cathedral and its Deans, and his Life of Bishop Ken appeared in the same year. Though diffuse, the book has something of the charm of Walton's Lives, and breathes the still air of a cathedral. Its main defect is the occasional intrusion of conjectural or 'ideal' biography.

Plumptre published several volumes of verse. He had a keen perception of literary excellence, unappeasable ambition, and unwearied industry; but his gifts were hardly sufficient to insure him a place among the poets. Lazarus and other poems appeared in 1864, 8vo (3rd edit. 1868); Master and scholar, which was warmly praised in the Westminster Review, in 1866, 8vo; and Things New and Old in 1884, 8vo.

Several of Plumptre's hymns have been admitted into popular collections, and satisfy their not very exacting requirements. He also translated with much success the plays of Sophocles (1865) and of Æschylus (1868), and thus gave readers ignorant of Greek some adequate conception of the masterpieces of Attic drama. For twenty years he studied Dante, and his English version of Dante's work appeared as The Divina Commedia and Canzoniere of Dante Alighieri; with Biographical Introduction, Notes and Essays (vol. i. 1886, 8vo, vol. ii. 1887).

== Sources ==
- Julian, John (June 1907). A Dictionary of Hymnology. London: John Murray. p. 897.
- Bailey, Albert Edward (1950). The Gospel in Hymns. New York: Charles Scribner's sons. pp. 368–370.
- "Plumptre, Edward Hayes". The New Schaff-Herzog Encyclopedia of Religious Knowledge. Vol. IX – via Christian Classics Ethereal Library.

Church of England titles
Preceded by George Johnson	Dean of Wells; 1881–1891	Succeeded by Thomas Jex-Blake
