= William Wilson Cash =

British Anglican bishop (1880–1955)

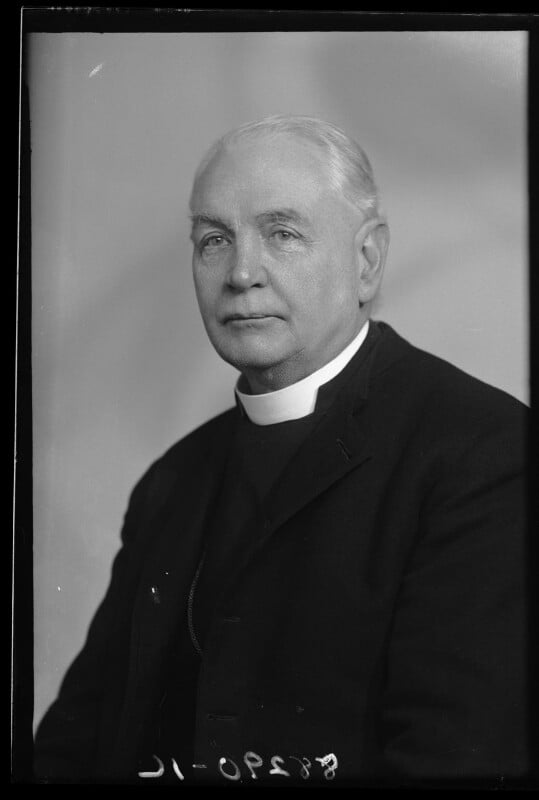
Wilson Cash in 1941

William Wilson Cash, DSO, OBE (12 June 1880 – 18 July 1955), was a British priest who served as Anglican Bishop of Worcester from 1941 to 1955. Wilson Cash was unusual for a bishop of a diocese in England at that time in that he was not public school nor Oxbridge educated.

== Life and career ==
Wilson Cash was educated in Sale and became a CMS missionary in 1902. Ordained in 1911, he was appointed a Chaplain to the Forces in 1916. He greatly impressed the Chaplain-General at his interview who described Wilson Cash as "A1, a Man". Wilson Cash served in Egypt and Mesopotamia and ended the War with a DSO and OBE and was five times Mentioned in Despatches. He preached at the Thanksgiving Service in St George's Cathedral, Jerusalem following General Allenby's triumphant march into the city. Afterwards he was General Secretary of the Society until his elevation to the episcopate as Bishop of Worcester in 1941. He had previously turned down invitations to be Bishop of Jerusalem and Archbishop of Sydney An Honorary Chaplain to the King, he died in post, aged 75. It appears that his military experience never left him, and this was reflected in one of the tributes paid to him on his death.

'There was very much the soldier in the Bishop's outlook. He was always on service, always disciplined ...'

== Works ==
- The Expansion of Islam: An Arab Religion in the Non-Arab World (1928)

Church of England titles
Preceded by Arthur Perowne	Bishop of Worcester; 1941–1955	Succeeded by Mervyn Charles-Edwards
