= Arthur Thomas Chapman =

Arthur Thomas Chapman (20 April 1873 - 26 April 1915) was a builders' merchant and estate developer in Coulsdon, Surrey (now part of the London Borough of Croydon).

== Life ==
Arthur was born on 20 April 1873 in Croydon to parents Thomas and Eliza Jane (née Grover) Chapman and was baptised at St. John the Baptist, Croydon (now Croydon Minster). He attended Whitgift Middle School, and commenced a military career, joining the Queen’s Royal West Surrey Regiment as a Private in 1888. He obtained a commission as Second Lieutenant, before retiring on grounds of ill-health in 1899.

On 15 September 1896 Arthur married Frederica Ada Landsberger at St. Michael and All Angels Church, Croydon. Their home was at Fiddlers’ Grove, Bletchingley, when the 1901 National Census was completed, but by 1911 they had moved to "Trevista", The Grove, Coulsdon, Surrey. In 1898 at the age of 24 Arthur became Chairman of Messrs. Chapman and Sons, Builders' Merchants, of Tamworth Road, Croydon. Chapman's was one of the main builders' merchants in the fast-growing Croydon of the 1890s, and also serviced the rest of South-east England.

Arthur was involved in early housing developments in Coulsdon. In 1903 he purchased 29 acres of land to the west of Smitham Bottom Lane from the estate of William Gilford for £5,000. He proceeded to develop this land as part of the Woodcote Grove Estate. He laid out Howard Road, Warwick Road and The Chase on this land. Strips of land were used to widen Smitham Bottom Lane, and this stretch of the road was renamed Woodcote Grove Road. Arthur founded the Smitham Downs Development Company Ltd., which proceeded to purchase land from Vernon Watney (of the noted brewing family) approximately in the triangle formed by the Brighton Road, Smitham Bottom Lane and Stoats Nest Road (which was to be renamed Smitham Downs Road). This area was marketed as the Smitham Downs Estate. The Avenue, The Grove, The Drive and The Vale were laid out.

The Chapmans took an active interest in the formation of the St. Andrew’s district in 1906 and on 1st December the vicar, the Revd. F. H. Roberts, asked Arthur to be one of the first wardens.

Arthur had remained involved in the military, joining the Surrey National Reserve in 1910 and authoring two booklets "The National Reserve Section Commander's Roll Book" and “Hints on Organising a Battalion” in 1913.

At the outbreak of war in August 1914 Arthur joined the 3rd (Reserve) Battalion East Surrey Regiment as a Lieutenant, and after a period of training was attached to the Hampshire Regiment on 13 September 1914. He was promoted to Captain on the 2nd February 1915. He fell in action in Flanders on April 26th 1915 and was buried at Oosttaverne Wood Cemetery, Belgium.

Arthur is commemorated at St. Andrew’s Church in Woodcote Grove Road, Coulsdon. The chancel screen and gates were erected to his memory, and bear a dedicatory plaque in his name.
