= T. T. Perowne =

Archdeacon of Norwich

Thomas Thomason Perowne (16 April 1824 – 6 May 1913) was an English Anglican cleric who was Archdeacon of Norwich from 1878 until 1910.

Perowne was born in Bardhaman, West Bengal, in British India, to missionary John Perowne and Eliza Scott. His brothers were John Perowne and Edward Perowne. He was educated at Corpus Christi College, Cambridge, and ordained in 1848. After curacies at St Michael, Cambridge and Holy Sepulchre, Cambridge he was Rector of Stalbridge then Redenhall with Harleston. He was also Examining Chaplain to successive Bishops of Norwich. He wrote the commentaries on the Book of Proverbs (1899), Obadiah and Jonah (1889), Haggai and Zechariah (1890), and Malachi (1890) in the Cambridge Bible for Schools and Colleges.

His son was Thomas John Perowne (1886–1954), who also served as the Archdeacon of Norwich.
