= George Wishart Anderson =

Scottish biblical scholar and Methodist minister

George Wishart Anderson FBA FRSE (25 January 1913 – 17 March 2002) was a British theologian.

== Life ==
He was born on 25 January 1913, the son of George Anderson, and his wife, Margaret Gordon Wishart.

In 1962 he was created Professor of Old Testament Literature and Theology at Edinburgh University in 1962. In 1968 he also succeeded his colleague, Rev Prof N. W. Porteous, and Anderson was then retitled Professor of Hebrew and Old Testament Studies.

In 1977 he was elected a Fellow of the Royal Society of Edinburgh.

He died on 17 March 2002.

== Family ==
In 1941 he married Edith ‘Joy’ Joyce Marjorie Walter. They had one son and one daughter. He remarried in 1959 following Joy’s death.

== Publications ==
- A Critical Introduction to the Old Testament (1959)
- Enemies and Evildoers in the Book of Psalms (1965)
- A Decade of Bible Bibliography (1967)
- The Society for Old Testament Study 1917-1967 (1968)
- The History and Religion of Israel (1974)
- Tradition and Interpretation (1979)
