= John Perowne =

English Anglican bishop

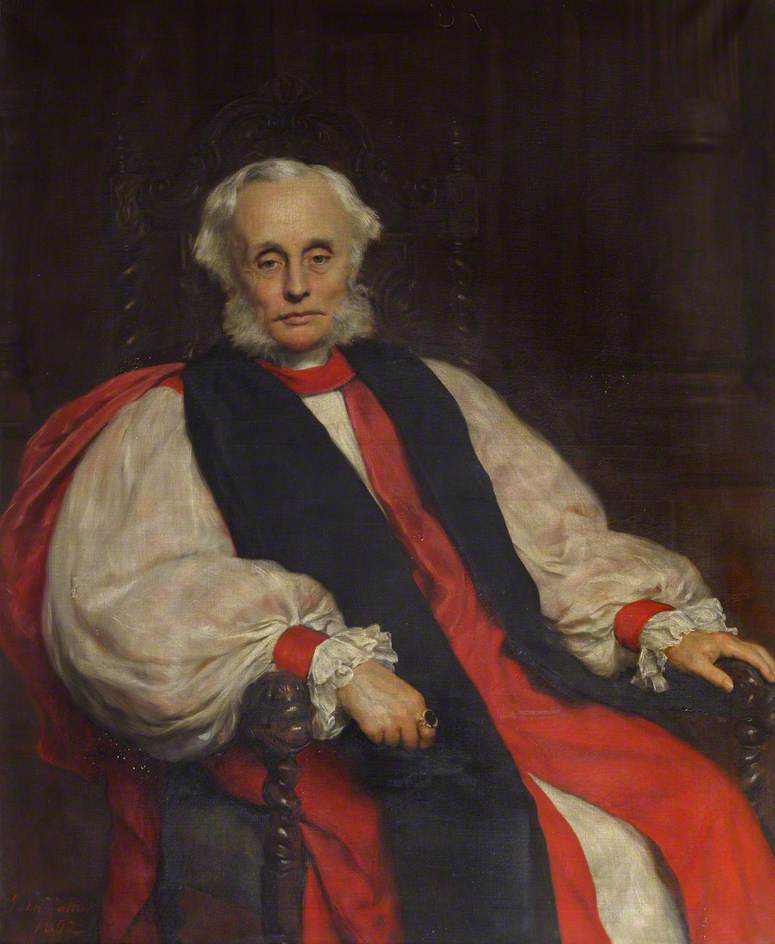
John Perowne, Bishop of Worcester

John James Stewart Perowne (3 March 1823 – 6 November 1904) was an English Anglican bishop. Born in Burdwan, Bengal, Perowne was a member of a notable clerical family, whose origins were Huguenot.

== Life ==
He was educated at Norwich School, and at Corpus Christi College, Cambridge, becoming a fellow in 1849 and where his brother Edward was later Master. After holding a chair in King's College London, he became, in 1862, the fourth vice-principal of St Davids College, Lampeter, a college with which he was already familiar, for he had been external examiner between 1851 and 1852. The ageing Principal of the college took a back seat, and Perowne effectively 'took the reins' until his departure from Lampeter in 1872.

In 1868 he was elected Hulsean lecturer, taking as his subject Immortality or rather conditional immortality; stating "The immortality of the soul is a phantom which eludes your eager grasp."

He was elected canon of Llandaff in 1869, dean of Peterborough 1878, and in 1891 succeeded Henry Philpott as bishop of Worcester. While at Lampeter, Perowne had gained a great respect for the theology of his predecessor in the role of Vice-Principal, Rowland Williams, and when he became a bishop, he went to great lengths to avoid taking action against modernists in the church. Indeed, a work by one of his incumbents, which denied the Trinity, the Virgin Birth, the Divinity of Christ, the Atonement, and the concepts of the Resurrection of Christ and the Ascension was described by Perowne as 'an honest attempt to deal with great spiritual problems' . He resigned his see in late 1901.

In 1884 he served as president of the Midland Union of Natural History Societies.

Perowne was a respected Hebrew scholar of the traditional type and sat on the Old Testament Revision Committee. He is best remembered as the general editor of the Cambridge Bible for Schools and Colleges. His chief works were a Commentary on the Book of Psalms (2 vols., 1864–1868) and a life of Bishop Thirlwall (1877–1878).

== Descendants ==
Perowne married Anna Maria Raikea, daughter of Humphry William Woolrych, before moving to Wales in 1862. His son, Arthur William Thomson Perowne, became the first Bishop of Bradford and, subsequently, Bishop of Worcester. Another son was John Thomas Woolrych Perowne, a British Army officer, King's Messenger, and Gold Staff Officer.

One of his grandsons, Stewart Perowne, married Dame Freya Stark and was the more famous as Head of Education in British Palestine, archaeologist, explorer, and writer.

Stewart's brother, Leslie, was sometime Head of Music at the BBC and was responsible for bringing Albert Ketèlbey out of retirement to conduct a huge BBC Ketèlbey Concert at the Royal Albert Hall prior to World War II.

== Sources ==
- Buckland, Augustus Robert (1912). "Perowne, John James Stewart" . In Lee, Sidney (ed.). Dictionary of National Biography (2nd supplement). London: Smith, Elder & Co.
- Buckland, A. R.; Wood. "Perowne, John James Stewart (1823–1904)first2= Stella". Oxford Dictionary of National Biography (online ed.). Oxford University Press. doi:10.1093/ref:odnb/35483. (Subscription, Wikipedia Library access or UK public library membership required.)
- D T W Price, A History of Saint David's University College, Lampeter, University of Wales Press, Cardiff. Volume One, to 1898 (ISBN 0-7083-0606-3)

Church of England titles
Preceded by Rowland Williams	Vice-principal of St Davids College, Lampeter; 1862–1872	Succeeded by William Harrison Davey
Preceded by Augustus Saunders	Dean of Peterborough; 1878–1891	Succeeded by Marsham Argles
Preceded by Henry Philpott	Bishop of Worcester; 1891–1901	Succeeded by Charles Gore
