= William Emery Barnes =

English Anglican priest and theologian (1859–1939)

The Reverend William Emery Barnes FRSE
- Born: William Emery Barnes; 26 May 1859; Islington, England
- Died: 17 August 1939 (aged 80); Exeter, England
- Spouse: Georgina de Horne (m. 1890)

Ecclesiastical career
- Religion: Christianity (Anglican)
- Church: Church of England
- Ordained: 1884

Academic background
- Education: Peterhouse, Cambridge

Academic work
- Discipline: Theology
- Institutions: Clare College, Cambridge; Peterhouse, Cambridge

William Emery Barnes FRSE (1859–1939) was an English academic, most notably Hulsean Professor of Divinity at the University of Cambridge from 1901 until 1934.

== Early life and education ==
Barnes was born on 26 May 1859 in Islington. He was educated at Islington Proprietary School and Peterhouse, Cambridge.

== Career ==
He was ordained in 1884 and served his title at St John's Church, Waterloo. He was a lecturer in Hebrew at Clare College, Cambridge, from 1885 to 1894; and in divinity at Peterhouse, Cambridge, from 1889 to 1901. He was Dean of Peterhouse from 1920 to 1921; Examining Chaplain to the Bishop of Peterborough from 1920 to 1927; and Canon Theologian of Leicester from 1932 until his death on 17 August 1939 in Exeter.

== Publications ==
- Canonical and Uncanonical Gospels, 1893
- The Peshitta Text of Chronicles, 1897
- The Psalms in the Peshitta Version, 1904
- Lex in Corde (studies in the Psalter), 1910
- Early Christians at Prayer, 1925
- The Forgivenesses of Jesus Christ, 1936

Academic offices
Preceded by Herbert Edward Ryle	Hulsean Professor of Divinity; 1887–1901	Succeeded by Francis Crawford Burkitt
