= Freya Stark =

British explorer and writer

Dame Freya Stark DBE
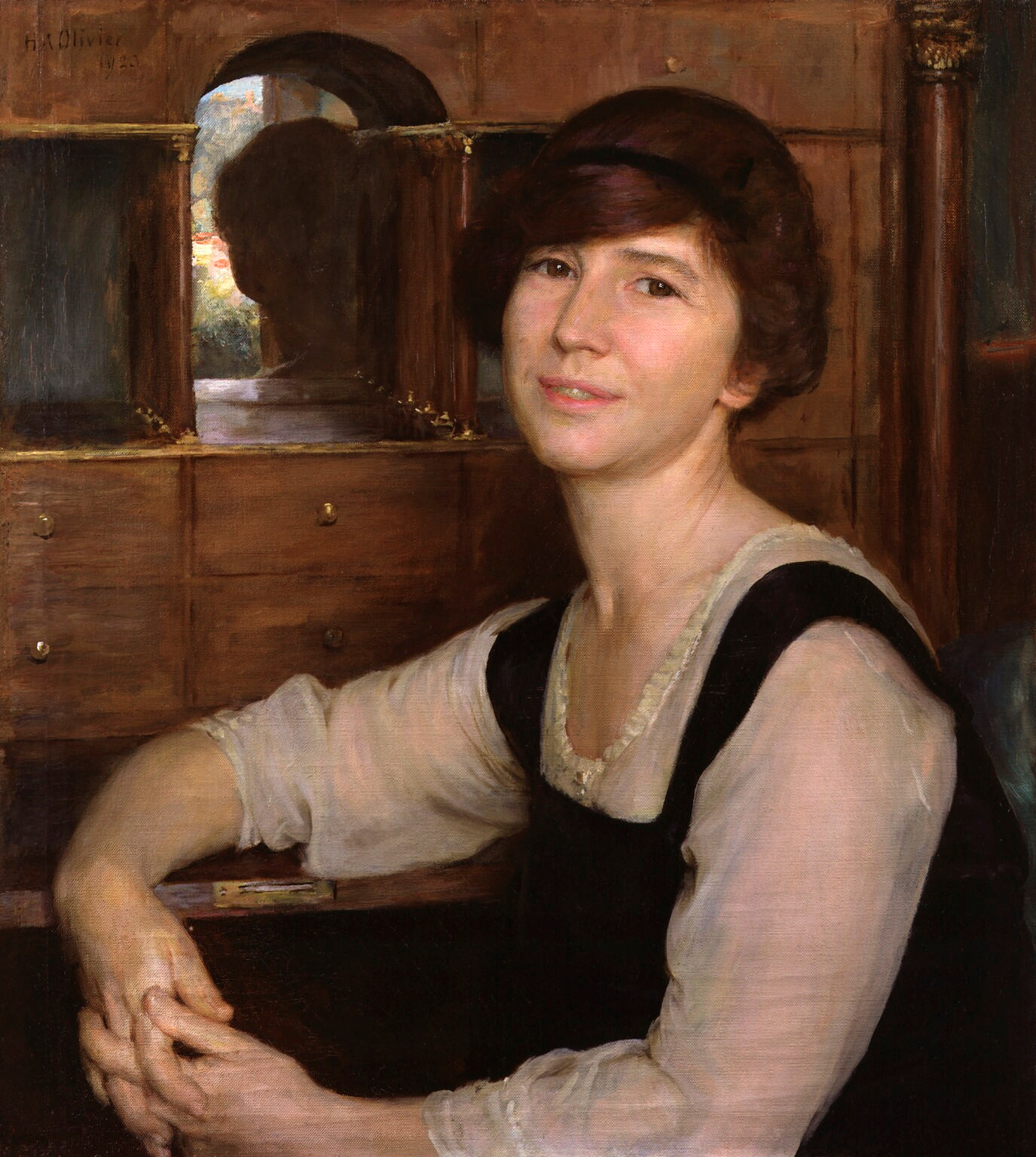
- Portrait by Herbert Arnould Olivier (1923), National Portrait Gallery, London
- Born: 31 January 1893; Paris, French Third Republic
- Died: 9 May 1993 (aged 100); Asolo, Veneto, Italy
- Occupations: Explorer, travel writer

Dame Freya Madeline Stark DBE (31 January 1893 – 9 May 1993) was a British-Italian explorer and travel writer. She wrote more than two dozen books on her travels in the Middle East and Afghanistan as well as several autobiographical works and essays. She was one of the first non-Arabs known to travel through the southern Arabian Desert in modern times.

== Early life and studies ==
Stark was born on 31 January 1893 in Paris, where her parents were studying art. Her mother, Flora, was of English, French, German, and Polish descent. Her father, Robert, was an English painter from Devon. Stark spent much of her childhood in northern Italy, helped by the fact that Pen Browning, a friend of her father, had bought three houses in Asolo. Her maternal grandmother lived in Genoa.

Her parents' marriage was unhappy, and they separated early in Stark's childhood. Stark's biographer, Jane Fletcher Geniesse—quoting Stark's cousin, Nora Stanton Barney—claimed that Stark's biological father was Obediah Dyer, "a well-to-do young man from a prominent family in New Orleans". No other corroboration of this account is known; Stark made no reference to it in her autobiography.

For her ninth birthday, Stark received a copy of One Thousand and One Nights and became fascinated with the Orient. She was often ill while young and confined to the house, so she found an outlet in reading. She delighted in reading French, in particular Alexandre Dumas. When she was thirteen, in an accident in a factory in Italy, her hair was caught in a machine, tearing her scalp and ripping her right ear off. She spent four months in hospital receiving skin grafts, leaving her face disfigured. She usually wore hats or bonnets, often flamboyant ones, to cover her scars.

At the age of 30, Stark enrolled at Bedford College, London to study Arabic and later, Persian. She subsequently attended the School of Oriental and African Studies (SOAS).

== Early travels and writings ==
One can only really travel if one lets oneself go and takes what every place brings without trying to turn it into a healthy private pattern of one's own and I suppose that is the difference between travel and tourism.

— Freya Stark

During World War I, Stark worked as a postal censor, trained as a VAD and served initially with G. M. Trevelyan's British Red Cross ambulance unit, based at the Villa Trento near Udine. Her mother had remained in Italy and taken a share in a business; her sister Vera married the co-owner. In 1926, Vera died after a miscarriage. In her writings, Stark explained that Vera was not able to live life on her own terms, and she would not do the same. Shortly afterward, she began her travels.

In November 1927, she visited Asolo for the first time in years. Later that month she boarded a ship for Beirut, where her travels in the East began. She stayed first at the home of James Elroy Flecker in Lebanon, then in Baghdad, Iraq (then a British protectorate), where she met the British high commissioner. During that trip, she secretly travelled by donkey with a Druze guide and an English woman. She kept the journey secret as Syria and Lebanon were under French control as the Mandate for Syria and the Lebanon. This was a repressive government system that did not allow travel within the region. The group travelled by night and took remote, countryside routes. However, French Army officers still caught them, thought the women to be spies, but released them three days later. After her trip, Stark wrote about the repressive French regime and the abuse inflicted on the Syrian people in an English magazine.

By 1931, she had completed three dangerous treks into the wilderness of western Iran, parts where Westerners were unknown, and had located the long-fabled Valleys of the Assassins (Hashshashins). She described these explorations in The Valleys of the Assassins (1934). She received the Royal Geographical Society's Back Award in 1933.

In 1934, Stark sailed down the Red Sea to Aden to begin a new adventure. She hoped to trace the frankincense route of the Hadhramaut, the hinterland of southern Arabia. Only a handful of Western explorers had ventured into the region but never so far or so widely as she. Her goal was to reach the ancient city of Shabwa, which was rumoured to have been the capital of the Queen of Sheba. She fell seriously ill on the trip. After contracting measles from a child in a harem, as well as dysentery, she had to be airlifted to a British hospital in Aden. Although she never reached Shabwa, she was able to travel extensively and recount many experiences. Stark returned to the region later for additional trips. During these journeys, she encountered slavery in Yemen, which caused a "moral predicament", according to a New Yorker profile. Stark reasoned that slavery seemed to decline in less religious societies, and thus she felt that slavery would decline in Arabia as it evolved. She published her account of the region in three books, The Southern Gates of Arabia: A Journey in the Hadhramaut (1936), Seen In The Hadhramaut (1938) and A Winter in Arabia (1940). For her travels and accounts, she received the Founder's Medal of the Royal Geographical Society.

== World War II ==
In the autumn of 1939 Stark offered her services to the British Ministry of Information. Her prior experience in the Middle East was sufficient for the Ministry to send her to Yemen to spread propaganda on the British cause. Part of her duties involved showing films, despite the rulers of Yemen being strict Muslims who disapproved of any images of humans and wildlife. After working for two months in Yemen and Aden, she was sent to Cairo, a posting that doubled her salary to £1,200. Following her arrival in June 1940, she set up an intimate salon where, over tea four times a week, she advocated for the British cause. Before long, Christopher Scaife who was teaching English at the King Fuad I University was sending her the odd Egyptian student who wanted to know what the British were fighting for. Stark encouraged them to bring their friends and the discussions expanded to cover not only the war but also its effects on Egypt. These discussions grew to become the basis of the Ikhwan al Hurriya (Brotherhood of Freedom) propaganda network that was aimed at persuading Arabs to support the Allies or at least remain neutral.

By the middle of the war, the brotherhood claimed to have tens of thousands of members. The work involved Stark travelling all over Egypt and often speaking for as many as 10 hours a day. These wartime experiences were described in her Letters from Syria (1942) and East is West (1945). Following a visit to Iraq during which she was besieged in the British Embassy during an attempted coup d'état in April 1941, Stark was asked by British Ambassador Sir Kinahan Cornwallis to set up a branch of the Ikhwan al Hurriya in that country. Stark agreed and spent the next two years in Iraq dispensing British propaganda.

In February 1943, she visited Archibald Wavell and his wife in India. To assist her with the return journey, Wavell arranged for her to have a car. After driving it from Delhi to Tehran, she sold it, but officials in Cairo and Aden took a dim view of her taking upon herself to dispose of government property in wartime. Stark believed that since it had been given to her, she could sell it.

In 1943, Stark went on an official tour of the British Mandate of Palestine. She gave speeches calling for quotas on Jewish migration to Palestine, which angered the global Jewish community. However, Stark felt that she was not at all anti-Jewish; she simply felt that Arab consent should be considered before mass migration took place. These speeches are thought to be her most controversial work during WWII. In 1943, she wrote "I really can’t see that there is any kind of way of dealing with the Zionist question except by a massacre now and then... What can we do? It is the ruthless last penny that they squeeze out of you that does it... the world has chosen to massacre them at intervals, and whose fault is it?"

== Post-war travel and writings ==
Following her marriage in 1947, she published a volume of miscellaneous essays, Perseus in the Wind (1948) and three volumes of autobiography, Traveller's Prelude (1950), Beyond Euphrates. Autobiography 1928–1933 (1951), and The Coast of Incense. Autobiography 1933–1939 (1953).

Following the failure of her marriage, Stark again began travelling, with her first extensive travels after the war being in Turkey, which was the basis of her books Ionia a Quest (1954), The Lycian Shore (1956), Alexander's Path (1958), and Riding to the Tigris (1959). After this, she continued her memoirs with Dust in the Lion's Paw. Autobiography 1939–1946 (1961), and she published a history of Rome on the Euphrates: The Story of a Frontier (1966) and another collection of essays, The Zodiac Arch (1968).

The last expedition was to Afghanistan in 1968, when she was 75 years old. She travelled to visit the twelfth-century Minaret of Jam. In 1970, she published The Minaret of Djam: An Excursion into Afghanistan. In her retirement in Asolo, apart from a short survey, Turkey: A Sketch of Turkish History (1971), she busied herself by putting together a new collection of essays, A Peak in Darien (1976), and preparing selections of her Letters (8 volumes, 1974–82; one volume, Over the rim of the world: selected letters, 1982), and of her travel writings, The Journey's Echo (1988).

== Photographic legacy ==
Stark, as well as being a writer, was a prolific and accomplished photographer. Some forty-plus of her albums, containing approximately 6,000 black-and-white prints, together with some 50,000 negatives are held as the Freya Stark Photograph Collection in the archive of the Middle East Centre, St Antony’s College, Oxford. Many of the photographs were taken with the same camera, a Leica III, which she bought in 1933 and used on her travels. The collection of photographs was published in its entirety in 1999, some having previously appeared in books such as A Traveller in Time: A Photographic Journey with Freya Stark by Malise Ruthven, 1986, Passionate Nomad: The Life of Freya Stark by Jane Fletcher Geniesse, 2001 and, of course, her own books, an example being Rivers of Time: Photographs by Freya Stark published in 1982.

Smaller collections of photographs by Stark are held at the Biblioteca Berenson, Villa I Tatti, Harvard University Centre for Italian Renaissance Studies Repository, in the Harry Ransom Centre, the University of Texas, at the Special Collections of the University of New South Wales, Canberra, and in the Conway Library whose archive, of primarily architectural images, is being digitised under the wider Courtauld Connects project.

In 1934, Stark was awarded the Royal Asiatic Society’s Richard Burton Memorial Medal in recognition of her contribution to geographic exploration and travel writing and a portrait of her resides in the society’s lecture room. The society holds 65 glass slides taken by Stark.

A photograph of Freya Stark by Robert Mapplethorpe, taken in 1975, was a gift of The Robert Mapplethorpe Foundation to the J. Paul Getty Trust and the Los Angeles County Museum of Art.

== Later life ==
She was appointed a Dame Commander of the Order of the British Empire (DBE) in the 1972 New Year's Honours.

She died at Asolo on 9 May 1993, a few months after her hundredth birthday.

== Personal life ==
In 1947, at the age of 54, she married Stewart Perowne, a British administrator, Arabist, and historian, whom she had met while working as his assistant in Aden early in World War II. Perowne was homosexual, which Stark did not know when they first married, although most of his friends did. Their marriage had many troubles, and Stark did not adjust well to being the wife of a civil servant. The couple had no children, separated in 1952, but did not divorce.

While revisiting Yemen in 1976, Stark suggested to the Secretary of the British Embassy with whom she was staying that she had never come close ‘to losing my virtue… including the nights I spent with Stewart.’ During that same trip, after decades without contact, Stark wrote to Perowne again, wishing him well.

Perowne died in 1989.

== Writings ==
- The Valleys of the Assassins and Other Persian Travels. 1934. (1934)
- The Southern Gates of Arabia A Journey in the Hadhramaut. 1936. (1936)
- Baghdad Sketches. 1937. (1937)
- Seen in the Hadhramaut (1938)
- A Winter in Arabia. 1940.(1940)
- Letters from Syria. 1942.(1942)
- East is West.(1945), published in US as Arab Island: The Middle East, 1939–1943.
- Perseus in the Wind. 1948.(1948)
- Stark, Freya (1983). Traveller's Prelude: Autobiography 1893–1927. Century. ISBN 9780712602747. (1950) Registration required.
- Beyond Euphrates: Autobiography 1928–1933. 1951.(1951)
- Stark, Freya (1990). The Coast of Incense: Autobiography 1933–1939. Arrow. ISBN 9780099728108. (1953) Registration required.
- Ionia, A Quest. Harcourt, Brace And Company.(1954)
- Davis, P. H.; Stark, Freya; Kinross, Lord (1956). "The Lycian Shore". The Geographical Journal. 122 (4): 495. Bibcode:1956GeogJ.122..495D. doi:10.2307/1790199. JSTOR 1790199.(1956)
- Alexander's Path: From Caria to Cilicia. 1958. (1958)
- Davis, P. H.; Stark, Freya (1960). "Riding to the Tigris". The Geographical Journal. 126 (2): 218. Bibcode:1960GeogJ.126..218D. doi:10.2307/1793984. JSTOR 1793984. (1959)
- Dust in the Lion's Paw. Autobiography 1939–1946. Harcourt, Brace & World. 1961. (1961)
- The Journey's Echo: Selected Travel Writings. (1963) foreword by Lawrence Durrell
- Rome on the Euphrates: The Story of a Frontier. (1966)
- The Zodiac Arch. (1968)
- Space, Time and Movement in Landscape. (1969)
- The Minaret of Djam: An Excursion into Afghanistan. (1970)
- Turkey: A Sketch of Turkish History. (1971)
- Letters, 1914–1980. (8 vols., 1974–82) edited by Caroline Moorehead
- A Peak in Darien. (1976)
- Over the Rim of the World: Selected Letters. (1988) edited by Caroline Moorehead

== See also ==
- List of female explorers and travellers

== Sources ==
- Geniesse, Jane Fletcher (2010). Passionate Nomad: The Life of Freya Stark. Random House Publishing Group. ISBN 9780307756855.
- P. H. Hansen, 'Stark, Dame Freya Madeline (1893–1993)', in Oxford Dictionary of National Biography (2004. Oxford University Press)
- M. Izzard 'A Marvellous Bright Eye: Freya Stark', in Cornucopia Issue 2 (1992)
- M. Izzard, Freya Stark: A Biography (1993)
- C. Moorehead, Freya Stark (1985. Penguin) ISBN 0-14-008108-9
- R. Knott, 'Posted in Wartime' (2017, Pen & Sword) – features inter alia the wartime correspondence of Freya Stark.
- M. Canali, 'Freya Stark', in Gnosis - Rivista italiana di Intelligence Issue 4 (2018) e 1 (2019)
