= Thomas Perowne (died 1954) =

Archdeacon of Norwich

Thomas John Perowne (23 August 1868 – 25 August 1954) was an English Anglican cleric who was Archdeacon of Norwich from 1937 until his death in 1954.

Perowne was born in Stalbridge, Dorset, to the Ven. Thomas Thomason Perowne (1824–1913) and Mary Gilles Wood. His father was also Archdeacon of Norwich, from 1878 until 1910. He was educated at Haileybury and Corpus Christi College, Cambridge and ordained in 1893. After curacies in locations including Lowestoft, Kelsale and Norwich he was Vicar of Hindringham from 1913 to 1922. He was Rector of Starston from 1922 to 1945; and Rural Dean of Redenhall from 1927 to 1936.
