= Stewart Perowne =

British diplomat and archaeologist

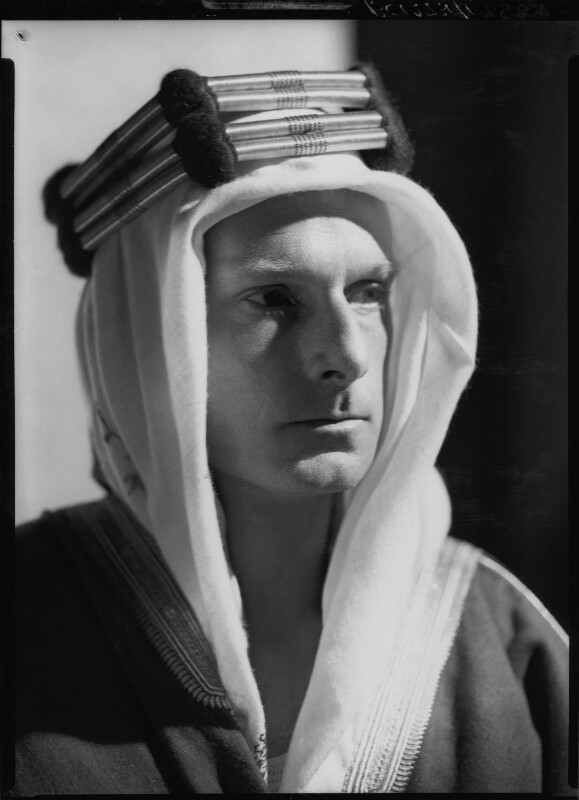
Stewart Henry Perowne (1939)

Stewart Perowne

Stewart Henry Perowne OBE, KStJ, FSA, FRSA (17 June 1901 – 10 May 1989) was a British diplomat, archaeologist, explorer and historian who wrote books on the history and antiquities of the Mediterranean. Despite his homosexuality, in 1947 he married the explorer and travel writer Freya Stark. The marriage was dissolved in 1952.

== Early life ==
Born in Hallow, Worcestershire, into a distinguished ecclesiastical family, Stewart Perowne was the grandson of John Perowne, the Bishop of Worcester, and the son of Helena Frances (née Oldnall-Russell) (1869–1922) and Arthur William Thomson Perowne, who was the first Bishop of Bradford and subsequently also Bishop of Worcester. His older brother was Francis Edward Perowne (1898–1988). His younger brother, Leslie Arthur Perowne (1906–1997), was Head of Music at the BBC and was responsible for bringing Albert Ketèlbey out of retirement to conduct a huge BBC Ketèlbey Concert at the Royal Albert Hall prior to World War II.

Perowne was educated at Haileybury College, where he was a champion sprinter, and at Corpus Christi College, Cambridge, where he studied Classical Archaeology and Architecture. He then studied at Harvard where he gained a graduate degree in classics. He went to Palestine in 1927 under the British Mandate, as Head of Education in the Palestine Government Education Service, teaching at the Anglican St George's School in Jerusalem. He became fluent in spoken and written Arabic. In 1930 Perowne transferred to the administrative branch of the Palestine Government, working for a time as Assistant District Commissioner for Galilee. In 1931 he was appointed an Officer of the Venerable Order of Saint John.

== Diplomatic career ==
Perowne and Freya Stark on their wedding day in 1947

Perowne later served in Malta, Aden, Iraq, Barbados, Libya and Israel. He was awarded the Coronation Medal in 1937. In 1938 Perowne worked for the BBC, preparing talks and features for transmission by the overseas Arabic service. In the same year he deposited a collection of potsherds with the British Museum, most of which are of Bronze Age type and probably derive from the ancient site of Subr. In 1939 he was appointed Public Information Officer in Aden, where he developed a passion for archaeology, and where he discovered the seventh century BC sites of Imadiya and Beihan. In 1941 Perowne was appointed Public Relations Officer to the British embassy in Baghdad. In 1944 he succeeded the scholar Vyvyan Holt as oriental counsellor.

During his diplomatic postings he designed stamps for Malta (1936), the Aden Protectorate (1938), Barbados (1949), Libya (1951), and currency notes for the West Indies Federation (1949) and Libya (1951).

== Marriage ==
Because of his career as a diplomat it was expected that Perowne should marry. As a homosexual he decided to embark on a mariage blanc, more specifically a lavender marriage, and on 7 October 1947 he married the explorer and travel writer Freya Stark at St Margaret's church in Westminster. She was his senior by eight years and had been his assistant in Yemen when he was Information Officer. Stark's biographer has argued that she may not have known of Perowne's homosexuality, and of his taste for men in uniform. "In 1947 people's sexual proclivities were still part of their private lives and … no one among Freya's friends seemed able to warn her of the pitfalls of marriage to a homosexual." Confused as to why Perowne would not sleep with her, she wrote to him, "I think you have left something lying between us, untold. Whatever it is, it will not make me think less of you or care less for you." Eventually, after skirting around the subject, he wrote to her:

It is difficult to say what "normal" is – my friend a counsellor of St George's Hospital always refuses to use the word and in both men and women, you have a wide and graded range from ultra-male to ultra-female with naturally most people in the middle ranges ... Now for myself, I put myself in the middle group. I have ordinary male abilities. I like male sports some of them, and I love the company of women. In fact, I find it hard to exist without it. At the same time, I am occasionally attracted by members of my own sex – generally. For some even pleasurable reason – by wearers of uniform.

Despite their similar interests the marriage could not survive and they divorced in 1952. There were no children.

== Later years ==
In 1947 Perowne was appointed Colonial Secretary to Barbados where he was a member of the island's Legislative Council before becoming political adviser in Cyrenaica from 1950 to 1951. Here he discovered the ancient city-site of Aziris. Taking early retirement in 1951, after his divorce in 1952 he returned to Palestine, now the State of Israel, where he assisted Weston Henry Stewart, the Anglican Bishop in Jerusalem in designing and organising model villages for Palestinian Arabs who had been made refugees as a result of the 1948 Arab–Israeli War. He was an Adviser to the UK delegation to the UN Assembly in Paris in November 1951. During this period he also began to write, his first book being Jerusalem, The One Remains (1954). Later books included The Life and Times of Herod the Great (1958), The Later Herods (1958), Hadrian (1960), Caesars and Saints (1962), The End of the Roman World (1966), and The Death of the Roman Republic (1969). Other books among the 18 he wrote include guides to Athens, Jerusalem, Rome and Malta. In addition, he was a frequent contributor to various edited works, encyclopaedias and academic journals, including Antiquity. Perowne was appointed OBE in 1944 and a Knight of the Venerable Order of Saint John (KStJ) in 1955. In 1957 he was named Fellow of the Society of Antiquaries (FSA). He was a Member of the Church of England Foreign Relations Council and a long-standing member of the famous Travellers' Club in Pall Mall, London. Works contributed by Perowne to the Conway Library are currently being digitised by the Courtauld Institute of Art, as part of the Courtauld Connects project.

Perowne's closing years were spent in the Distressed Gentlefolks' Aid Association's care home in Vicarage Gate, Kensington, London. He died in 1989 at Charing Cross Hospital in London aged 87 years old. He was survived by his former wife, Freya Stark.

== Publications ==
- Notes on Three Tablets in the "Ta Giesu" Church, Rabat, Malta (1937)
- The One Remains: On Jerusalem Hodder & Stoughton, London (1954)
- The Life and Times of Herod the Great Hodder & Stoughton, London (1958)
- The Later Herods Hodder & Stoughton, London (1958)
- Hadrian Hodder & Stoughton, London (1960)
- Caesars and Saints Hodder & Stoughton, London (1962)
- The Pilgrim's Companion in Rome. The Ancient City Hodder & Stoughton, London (1964)
- The Pilgrim's Companion in Athens Hodder & Stoughton, London (1964)
- The Pilgrim's Companion in Jerusalem and Bethlehem Hodder and Stoughton, London (1964)
- Jerusalem & Bethlehem Phoenix House, London (1965)
- The Political Background of the New Testament Hodder & Stoughton, London (1965)
- The End of the Roman World Hodder & Stoughton, London (1966)
- The Death of the Roman Republic Hodder & Stoughton, London (1969)
- The Siege Within the Walls : Malta 1940–1943 Hodder & Stoughton, London (1970)
- Rome, From Its Foundation to the Present Paul Elek Productions, London (1971)
- The Journeys of St. Paul Hamlyn, London (1973)
- The Caesars' Wives : Above Suspicion? Hodder and Stoughton, London (1974)
- The Archaeology of Greece and the Aegean Hamlyn, London (1974)
- Roman Mythology Newnes, (1983)
