= Edward Perowne =

English clergyman and college head

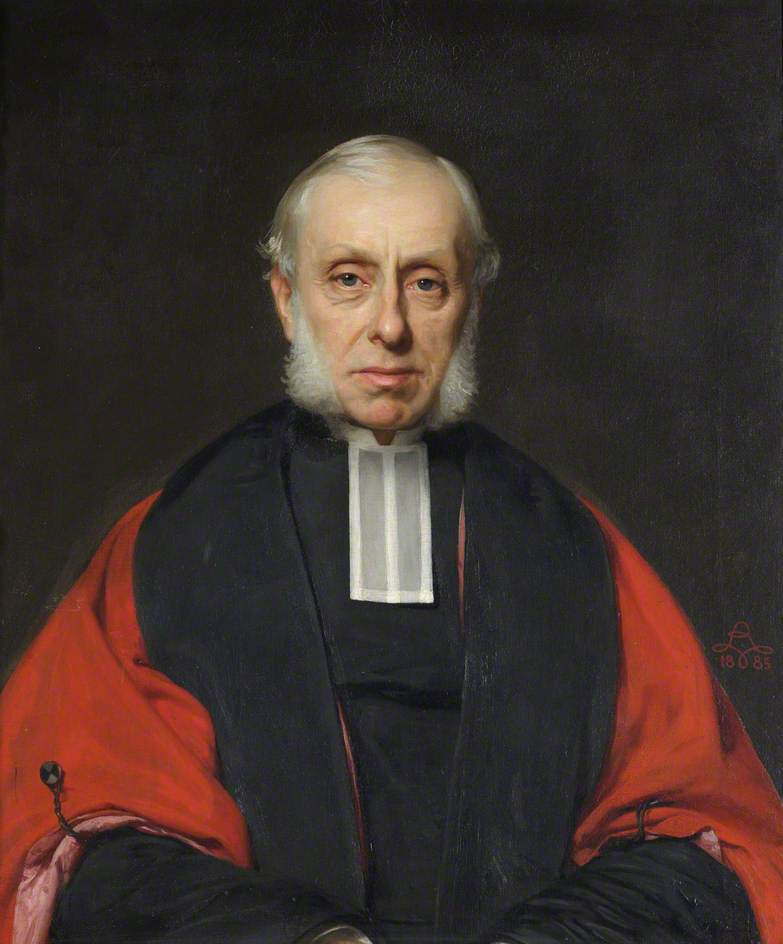
Edward Perowne by Rudolf Lehmann

Edward Henry Perowne (8 January 1826 in Burdwan, India – 5 February 1906, in Cambridge) was an English clergyman and college head, Master of Corpus Christi College, Cambridge.

== Life ==
Edward Henry Perowne was the youngest son of three born to the Revd John Perowne and Eliza née Scott, C.M.S. missionaries at Burdwan in India. He was educated at home and at Norwich before going on to Corpus Christi College, Cambridge in 1846. Made a scholar the following year, he graduated B.A. in Classics in 1850.

He was ordained as a deacon in 1850 and a priest in 1851, becoming the curate at Maddermarket in Norfolk.

Perowne was made a Fellow of his old college Corpus Christi in 1858 eventually becoming Master in 1879.

From 1879 to 1881 he was Vice-Chancellor of the University of Cambridge, as well as holding various other positions in the Church of England.

He died unmarried on 5 February 1906 in Cambridge. He is buried in Grantchester.

== Family tree ==
Academic offices
Preceded by James Pulling	Master of Corpus Christi College, Cambridge; 1879-1906	Succeeded by Robert Townley Caldwell
Academic offices
Preceded by John Power	Vice-Chancellor of the University of Cambridge; 1879-1881	Succeeded by James Porter
