= 2027 census of India =

16th Indian census

16th census of India
- 9 to 28 February 2027
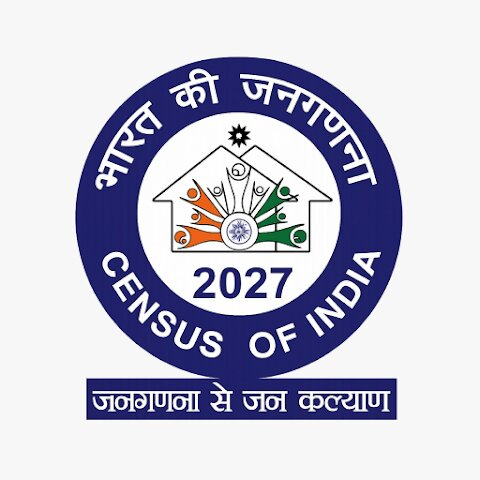
- Logo of the 2027 census of India

General information
- Country: India
- Authority: Registrar General and Census Commissioner of India
- Website: censusindia.gov.in

Results
- Total population: 1,476,625,576 (expected) (▲21.95%)
- Most populous state: Uttar Pradesh (expected)
- Least populous state: Sikkim (expected)

The 2027 Census of India, or the 16th Indian census, is being conducted in two phases: the House Listing and Housing Census phase, commenced on 1 April 2026 and continued until September 2026, followed by the Population Enumeration phase scheduled to be conducted between 9 to 28 February 2027. In certain Himalayan and snow-bound regions, such as Ladakh, Himachal Pradesh, Jammu and Kashmir and Uttarakhand, Population Enumeration was scheduled from August to September 2026. The census was postponed from the original scheduled date of 2021 due to the COVID-19 pandemic in India, and was subsequently rescheduled for 2026–27.

This 2027 census includes caste enumeration for the first time since 1931. The census will serve as the basis for the delimitation exercise for redistribution of seats in the Lok Sabha. However, the Government of India had initially proposed to use data from the 2011 Census of India for delimitation instead of waiting for the 2027 Census, in order to avoid delays and enable faster implementation of the Women's Reservation provisions through the Constitution (131st Amendment) Bill, 2026; the Bill was introduced in the Lok Sabha on 16 April 2026 but failed to secure the required special two-thirds majority of members present and voting, falling short by 56 votes, and consequently, as per the Delimitation Act, 2002, it was determined that the 2027 Census would be used for the next delimitation exercise as well as for woman reservation.

In September 2019, home minister Amit Shah announced that the census would be conducted digitally using a mobile application and in 16 languages.

It is also the first Indian census to introduce self-enumeration, allowing residents to submit their details online through a dedicated portal.

== Information collection ==
=== Houselisting and Housing Census ===
The Houselisting and Housing Census will be conducted between 1 April 2026 and 30 September 2026, with a 30-day continuous operation period for each state/UT. An optional 15-day Self-Enumeration period will precede the house-to-house survey.
The House-listing schedule contains 31 questions:

No.	Information
1	Building Number (Municipal, local authority or census number)
2	Census House Number
3	Predominant material of floor, wall and roof of the census house
4	Ascertain use of census house
5	Condition of the census house
6	Household number
7	Total number of persons normally residing in the household
8	Name of the head of the household
9	Sex of the head of the household
10	Whether the head of the household belongs to SC/ST/Other
11	Ownership status of the census house
12	Number of dwelling rooms exclusively in possession of the household
13	Number of married couple(s) living in the household
14	Main source of drinking water
15	Availability of drinking water source
16	Main source of lighting
17	Access to latrine
18	Type of latrine
19	Waste water outlet
20	Availability of bathing facility
21	Availability of kitchen and LPG/PNG connection
22	Main fuel used for cooking
23	Radio/Transistor
24	Television
25	Access to Internet
26	Laptop/Computer
27	Telephone/Mobile phone/Smartphone
28	Bicycle/Scooter/Motorcycle/Moped
29	Car/Jeep/Van
30	Main cereal consumed in the household
31	Mobile number

=== Population enumeration ===
Population Enumeration will be conducted in February 2027 across India. For the Ladakh UT and snow-bound non-synchronous areas of Jammu & Kashmir, Himachal Pradesh, and Uttarakhand, house-to-house Population Enumeration will take place in September 2026, preceded by an optional PE Self-Enumeration exercise from 17 August to 31 August 2026. In this phase of the census, caste-related question will also be included. Each person is enumerated and her/his individual information such as age, marital status, religion, SC/ST categorization, caste, mother tongue, education level, disability, economic activity, migration, fertility (for female). etc. are collected.

No.	Information
1	Name of the person
2	Relationship to head
3	Sex
4	Date of Birth and Age
5	Current Marital Status
6	Age at Marriage
7	Spouse Name
8	Nationality as declared
9	Religion
10	Scheduled Caste (SC)/ Scheduled Tribe (ST)/Caste
11	Father’s Particulars
12	Mother’s Particulars
13	Disability
14	Mother Tongue and other languages known
15	Literacy and digital literacy status
16	Status of attendance in educational institution
17	Highest educational level attained and Stream/Discipline
18	Worked any time during last year
19	Category of economic activity
20	Occupation
21	Nature of industry, trade or service
22	Class of worker
23	Non-economic activity (for marginal, semi-marginal and non-worker)
24	Seeking or available for work (for marginal, semi-marginal and non-worker)
25	Travel to place of work
26	Birth place
27	Place of last residence
28	Reason for migration
29	Duration of stay in this village/town since last migration
30	Permanent Residential Address
31	Number of children surviving at present (for currently married, widowed, divorced and separated women only)
32	Number of children ever born alive (for currently married, widowed, divorced and separated women only)
33	Number of children born alive during last one year (for currently married women only)
34	Place of Covid-19 Vaccination
35	Total number of Bank Accounts
36	Mobile Number (if available)
37	Aadhaar Number (if available)
38	Voter ID Number (if available)
39	Passport Number (if Indian Passport holder)
40	Availability of Driving License

== Self-enumeration ==
For the Houselisting and Housing Census (HLO), the Government of India introduced, for the first time, an optional self-enumeration facility that allows residents to submit household information online before an enumerator visits. Households can log in to the dedicated portal using a mobile number, complete a digital questionnaire on housing conditions, amenities, and assets, and receive a unique Self-Enumeration ID (SE ID), which is later verified and integrated by field staff during Houselisting operations. The portal is available in 16 languages — Assamese, Bengali, English, Gujarati, Hindi, Kannada, Konkani, Malayalam, Manipuri, Marathi, Nepali, Odia, Punjabi, Tamil, Telugu, and Urdu — and includes user guides, FAQs, tooltips, flowcharts, and tutorial videos within the portal itself to assist respondents.

The self-enumeration window runs for 15 days immediately before the commencement of house-to-house Houselisting and Housing Census field operations in each State/UT, creating an effective 45-day block per jurisdiction. The overall Phase I (HLO) is conducted in a staggered manner across all 36 States and Union Territories between April and September 2026.

For the Population Enumeration phase, Self-Enumeration for Ladakh UT and the snow-bound non-synchronous areas of Jammu & Kashmir, Himachal Pradesh, and Uttarakhand will take place from 17 August to 31 August 2026. For the remaining states and UTs, the period of Self-Enumeration will be notified later.

State and UT-wise self-enumeration schedule for the Houselisting and Housing Census
State/Union Territories	Self-enumeration period (2026)
Andaman and Nicobar Islands; Delhi (NDMC & Delhi Cantonment Board); Goa; Karnataka; Lakshadweep; Mizoram; Odisha; Sikkim	1 April – 15 April
Dadra and Nagar Haveli and Daman and Diu; Gujarat	5 April – 19 April
Uttarakhand	10 April – 24 April
Andhra Pradesh; Arunachal Pradesh; Chandigarh; Chattisgarh; Haryana; Madhya Pradesh	16 April – 30 April
Bihar	17 April – 1 May
Telangana	26 April – 10 May
Punjab	30 April – 14 May
Delhi (MCD areas); Jharkhand; Maharashtra; Meghalaya; Rajasthan	1 May – 15 May
Uttar Pradesh	7 May – 21 May
Jammu and Kashmir; Ladakh; Puducherry	17 May – 31 May
Himachal Pradesh	1 June – 15 June
Kerala; Nagaland	16 June – 30 June
Tamil Nadu; Tripura	17 July – 31 July
West Bengal	1 August – 15 August
Assam	2 August – 16 August
Manipur	17 August – 31 August

== Enumeration methods ==
=== Digital enumeration ===
In April 2019, at the conference of data users it was announced that 3.3 million enumerators would be enlisted and that they would be encouraged to use their own smart phones, although a paper option will also be available, which the enumerators will then need to submit electronically. During the census exercise a census portal will be opened, allowing individuals to self-enumerate after logging in using their phone numbers. The building of a mobile app for conducting the census along with the creation of the census portal for information collection is aimed at doing away with paper records in the exercise, making India along with Vietnam and Eswatini, one of the few countries who have tried to do so.

== National Population Register (NPR) ==
The National Population Register (NPR) will be linked to this census. The NPR was supposed to be updated along with the first phase of census between April and September 2020, however that too has been postponed indefinitely. On 24 December 2019, the central Government approved ₹39.41 billion (equivalent to ₹53 billion or US$550 million in 2026) for updating the NPR across India.

== Caste enumeration ==
The 15th Indian census, taken in 2011, attempted to estimate the population based on Socio-Economic and Caste Status for the first time since 1931. However, as the enumeration was based on recording the respondents' declaration, it led to creation of hundreds of thousands of caste/subcaste categories. For the 16th Indian census, the government was instead considering enumeration based on a list of educationally or socially disadvantaged castes (known as Other Backward Class) reported by each state. However, in February 2020, the Indian government rejected the demand for OBC data as part of the 2021 census.

In September 2018, the then Home Minister, Rajnath Singh, announced that the 2021 census will have Other Backward Class (OBC) data, for the first time since the 1931 census. Despite this announcement, the questionnaire presented in July 2019 did not have a specific OBC category. Several state legislative assemblies passed resolutions for collecting OBC data including the Maharashtra Legislative Assembly, Odisha Legislative Assembly, and Bihar Legislative Assembly, while the government of Uttar Pradesh, rejected the opposition's demand to pass such a resolution. On 29 February 2020, central government refused to conduct caste census despite demands from states. Despite Centre's rejection, Maharashtra legislators were adamant for caste based census at least in the state. Protest march in support of OBC census was carried out in Jammu and Kashmir. Minister of State Social Justice and Empowerment, Ramdas Athawale also demanded carrying of census counting every single caste in India. On 6 June 2022 the Bihar government issued a notification to conduct a caste survey, and began collecting data on 7 January following the dismissal of petitions against it in the supreme court. On 2 October the Bihar government released preliminary data from the survey, with the full detailed report being publicly released in the state assembly on 7 November 2023. On 26 June 2024, the Tamil Nadu legislative assembly unanimously adopted a resolution urging the Central government to immediately commence census work along with a caste based population census, however the Chief Minister M. K. Stalin declined to conduct a Bihar style caste survey, as any changes made to reservation based on a survey by the state government could be struck down by the courts, while contending that a full-fledged census can be legally only conducted by the Central government under the Census Act, 1948. In July 2024, Central Minister Chirag Paswan backed the demand for conducting a caste census as part of the 2021 census, however he opposed its data from being publicly revealed as he believed it will lead to division in society.

During the 2024 general elections, the inclusion of a caste census became a key demand of the opposition INDIA alliance led by the Congress.

On April 30 2025, Cabinet Committee on Political Affairs decided to include caste enumeration (caste census) in forthcoming census exercise. The 2027 census will record individual's specific jati rather than broad categories, like OBC or Upper caste.

The open text format for collecting caste (except SC & ST) data, instead of predefined drop-down list according to a master list of castes, for enumeration of caste is widely criticised by Opposition political parties of India and others. Tamil Nadu Legislative assembly & Telangana Legislative assembly passed resolutions against use of open text format in enumeration of caste data that can result like multiple entries and unusable flawed data like in 2011 Socio Economic and Caste Census. The list of 4635 castes are recorded in The People of India project by Anthropological Survey of India which also include 2203 Upper castes list.

== Delays ==
The 2021 census is the first census to ever be postponed in India since its beginning under the British in 1871. Even during the Second World War, the census of India was held in 1941 as scheduled, although the tabulations of the results of the 1941 census were incomplete compared to the detailed reports published after the 1931 census. Before the census, according to the rules, the boundaries of administrative units are to be frozen before conducting a census; this was initially supposed to have happened on 31 December 2019, with the states having to update these changes to the Registrar General of India by 31 January 2020. The house listing phase or the first phase of the census along with the NPR was to be conducted between April 1, 2020, and September 30, 2020, with the population enumeration or second phase in February 2021 and a revision round in March 2021. However following the COVID-19 pandemic, the Central government postponed the house listing phase of the census exercise, before the census in its entirety was postponed to 2022 However the census was never conducted in 2022 as it was repeatedly delayed. The deadline to freeze administrative boundaries was first extended to 31 December 2020, then to 31 March 2021, then further extended to 30 June, then to 31 December of the same year until it was extended to 30 June 2022, after which it was extended to 31 December 2022, and then another extension was granted till 30 June 2023. The exercise was then given a further extension to 1 January 2024, this was followed by another extension to 30 June 2024. Based on a Reuters report citing government officials, it was expected that the census would begin in September 2024, however no final approval was given for this timeline.

=== Reasons for the delays ===
The official rationale for the initial extensions of deadlines had been the COVID-19 pandemic, however this had been criticized as during 2021–22, twelve countries in Asia were able to conduct their decennial census including neighbouring Bangladesh and Nepal. An analysis by The Hindu found that 143 countries had conducted their censuses after March 2020, with India being one of the only two countries which were yet to conduct their regular census exercise among the ten most populous countries in the world, at the time of the analysis, with the other being Nigeria.

The delays have also been attributed by analysts to the linking of the census with the NPR exercise which is seen as the first step towards the controversial National Register of Citizens (NRC), the decision to update the NPR and discussions on imposing a nationwide NRC were some of the key issues taken up by the CAA-NRC protests. The demands for a caste census have also been attributed as one of the reasons behind the continuous delays.

=== Impact of delays ===
The continuous postponement of the census has led to many commentators and newspaper editorials demanding for it to be conducted immediately as census information is the only way to gain granular data on the country, as sample surveys can only provide state or countrywide data rather than street, village or block level data, with some of these surveys also relying on census data. The lack of census data is said to be a major handicap for policy-makers as without it, they have to rely on outdated census data for local level planning. Many key welfare interventions in India such as the Public Distribution System and the NFSA are reliant on census data, and having outdated data has led to the exclusion of many potential beneficiaries. Without census data, it is also difficult to validate the outcomes of government interventions using key metrics such as literacy, housing, fertility, urbanization, etc. The lack of updated census data also affects the quantum of reservation for SC/ST segments of the population and the delimitation of constituencies for elections.

== Final results ==
Following delays, the government of India announced in June 2025 that the house listing phase would begin in April 2026, with the population enumeration scheduled for February 2027. Provisional results are anticipated by late 2027, with the final report expected by late 2028, as the census typically requires more than a year to complete.

== See also ==
- Bihar caste-based survey 2023
- Caste census
