= Census of India =

Decennial census mandated by the 1948 Census of India Act

- Genre: Statistics
- Frequency: Decennial
- Country: India
- Inaugurated: March 1, 1951; 75 years ago
- Most recent: March 1, 2011; 15 years ago
- Previous event: 2011 census of India
- Next event: 2027 census of India
- Major events: Data-gathering, statistical analysis, and dissemination
- Organiser: Registrar General and Census Commissioner of India
- Website: www.censusindia.gov.in

The decennial census of India has been conducted 15 times, as of 2011. While it has been undertaken every 10 years, beginning in 1872 under Viceroy Lord Mayo, the first complete census was taken in 1872. Post 1949, it has been conducted by the Registrar General and Census Commissioner of India under the Ministry of Home Affairs, Government of India.

All the censuses since 1951 were conducted under the Census Act, 1948, which predates the Constitution of India. The last census was held in 2011, whilst the next was to be held in 2021 before it was postponed due to the COVID-19 pandemic. The next 16th census will commence from 1st October 2026 for the Himalayan states and 1st March 2027 for rest of the Indian states.

== British Rule ==
Cover of Volume 17 of the 1911 census report (fully digitized file)

The Census of India prior to independence was conducted periodically from 1865 to 1941. The censuses were primarily concerned with administration and faced numerous problems in their design and conduct ranging from the absence of house numbering in hamlets to cultural objections on various grounds to dangers posed by wild animals to census personnel. The sociologist Michael Mann called the census exercise "more telling of the administrative needs of the British than of the social reality for the people of British India". The differences in the nature of Indian society during the British Raj from the value system and the societies of the West were highlighted by the inclusion of "caste", "religion", "profession" and "age" in the data to be collected, as the collection and analysis of that information had a considerable impact on the structure and politics of Indian society.

== Republic of India ==
=== 1951 ===
The 1951 census of India was the ninth in a series of censuses held in India every decade since 1871. It was also the first census after independence and Partition of India. 1951 census was also the first census to be conducted under 1948 Census of India Act. The first census of the Indian Republic began on February 10, 1951.

The population of India was counted as 361,088,090 (1000:946 male:female) Total population increased by 42,427,510, 13.31% more than the 318,660,580 people counted during the 1941 census. No census was done for Jammu and Kashmir in 1951 and its figures were interpolated from 1941 and 1961 state census. National Register of Citizens for Assam (NRC) was prepared soon after the census. In 1951, at the time of the first population census, just 18% of Indians were literate while life expectancy was 32 years. Based on 1951 census of displaced persons, 7,226,000 Muslims went to Pakistan (both West and East Pakistan) from India, while 7,249,000 Hindus and Sikhs moved to India from Pakistan (both West and East Pakistan).

=== 1961 ===
The 1961 census of India was the tenth in a series of censuses held in India every decade since 1871.

The population of India was counted as 438,936,918 people.

Population increased by 21.55%

=== 1971 ===
The 1971 census of India was the 11th in a series of censuses held in India every decade since 1871.

The population of India was counted as 547,949,809 people.

Population increased by 24.83%

=== 1981 ===
The 1981 census of India was the 12th in a series of censuses held in India every decade since 1871. The population of India was counted as 685,184,692 people.

Population increased by 25%

=== 1991 ===
The 1991 census of India was the 13th in a series of censuses held in India every decade since 1871.

The population of India was counted as 838,583,988. The number of enumerators was 1.6 million.

Population increased by 22.38%

=== 2001 ===
The 2001 census of India was the 14th in a series of censuses held in India every decade since 1871.

The population of India was counted as 1,028,737,436 consisting of 532,223,090 males and 496,514,346 females. The total population increased by 182,310,397, 21.5% more than the 846,427,039 people counted during the 1991 census.

=== 2011 ===
The 2011 census of India or the 15th Indian census was conducted in two phases, house listing and population enumeration. The House listing phase began on 1 April 2010 and involved the collection of information about all buildings. Information for National Population Register (NPR) was also collected in the first phase, which will be used to issue a 12-digit unique identification number to all registered Indian residents by Unique Identification Authority of India. The second population enumeration phase was conducted between 9 and 28 February 2011. Census has been conducted in India since 1872 and 2011 marks the first time biometric information was collected. According to the provisional reports released on 31 March 2011, the Indian population increased to 1.21 billion with a decadal growth of 17.70%. Adult literacy rate increased to 74.04% with a decadal growth of 9.21%. The motto of the census was Our Census, Our Future.

Spread across 28 states (Note: Prior to the creation of Telangana.) and 8 union territories, the census covered 640 districts, 5,924 sub-districts, 7,935 towns and more than 600,000 villages. A total of 2.7 million officials visited households in 7,935 towns and 600,000 villages, classifying the population according to gender, religion, education and occupation. The cost of the exercise was approximately ₹2,200 crore (US$230 million) – this comes to less than US$0.50 per person, well below the estimated world average of US$4.60 per person.

Information on castes was included in the census following demands from several ruling coalition leaders including Lalu Prasad Yadav, and Mulayam Singh Yadav supported by opposition parties Bharatiya Janata Party, Shiromani Akali Dal, Shiv Sena and All India Anna Dravida Munnetra Kazhagam. Information on caste was last collected during the British Raj in 1931. During the early census, people often exaggerated their caste status to garner social status and it is expected that people downgrade it now in the expectation of gaining government benefits. Earlier, there was speculation that there would be a caste-based census conducted in 2011, the first time in 80 years (last was in 1931), to find the exact population of the "Other Backward Classes" (OBCs) in India. This was later accepted and the Socio Economic and Caste Census 2011 was conducted whose first findings were revealed on 3 July 2015 by Central Finance Minister Arun Jaitley. Mandal Commission report of 1980 quoted OBC population at 52%, though National Sample Survey Organisation (NSSO) survey of 2006 quoted OBC population at 41%.

There is only one other instance of a caste count in post-independence India. It was conducted in Kerala in 1968 by the Government of Kerala under E. M. S. Namboodiripad to assess the social and economic backwardness of various lower castes. The census was termed Socio-Economic Survey of 1968 and the results were published in the Gazetteer of Kerala, 1971.

=== 2027 ===
The 2027 Census of India, or the 16th Indian census, is being conducted in two phases: the House Listing and Housing Census phase, commenced on 1 April 2026 and continued until September 2026, followed by the Population Enumeration phase scheduled to be conducted between 9 to 28 February 2027. In certain Himalayan and snow-bound regions, such as Ladakh, Himachal Pradesh, Jammu and Kashmir and Uttarakhand, Population Enumeration was scheduled from August to September 2026. The census was postponed from the original scheduled date of 2021 due to the COVID-19 pandemic in India, and was subsequently rescheduled for 2026–27.

This 2027 census includes caste enumeration for the first time since 1931. The census will serve as the basis for the delimitation exercise for redistribution of seats in the Lok Sabha. However, the Government of India had initially proposed to use data from the 2011 Census of India for delimitation instead of waiting for the 2027 Census, in order to avoid delays and enable faster implementation of the Women's Reservation provisions through the Constitution (131st Amendment) Bill, 2026; the Bill was introduced in the Lok Sabha on 16 April 2026 but failed to secure the required special two-thirds majority of members present and voting, falling short by 56 votes, and consequently, as per the Delimitation Act, 2002, it was determined that the 2027 Census would be used for the next delimitation exercise as well as for woman reservation.

In September 2019, home minister Amit Shah announced that the census would be conducted digitally using a mobile application and in 16 languages.

It is also the first Indian census to introduce self-enumeration, allowing residents to submit their details online through a dedicated portal.

== See also ==
- Demographics of India
- List of cities in India by population
- List of Indian states and union territories by literacy rate
- List of million-plus urban agglomerations in India
- List of states and union territories of India by population
- List of states and union territories of India by sex ratio
- List of states in India by past population
- Timeline of Indian history
