= Rupahi =

Village in Nagaon district, Assam, India

- Village
- Interactive map of Rupahi
- Coordinates: 26.437377°N 92.717743°E
- Country: India
- State: Assam

Government
  - Body: Gram panchayat

Area
  - Total: 267.63 ha (661.3 acres)

Population (2011)
  - Total: 5,100
  - Density: 1,900/km^{2} (4,900/sq mi)

Languages
  - Official: Assamese
- Time zone: UTC+5:30 (IST)
- Postal code: 782125
- ISO 3166 code: IN-AS
- Vehicle registration: AS

Rupahi is a village situated in Nagaon district of Assam, India. The village has a population of 5,100 people with 2,598 males and 2,502 females, as censused in 2011 by the Registrar General and Census Commissioner of India under the Ministry of Home Affairs, Government of India.
