= List of Indian states by infant mortality rate =

This is a list of Indian states and union territories by infant mortality rates in 2024. The infant mortality rate is the number of deaths of infants under one year old per 1,000 live births. The data is taken from the Sample Registration System, a large-scale demographic survey published by the Registrar General and Census Commissioner of India. This rate is often used as an indicator of population health. According to this national data India's infant mortality rate stood at 24 per 1,000 live births in 2024, while according to the UN Inter-agency Group for Child Mortality Estimation it stood at 23 per 1,000 live births.

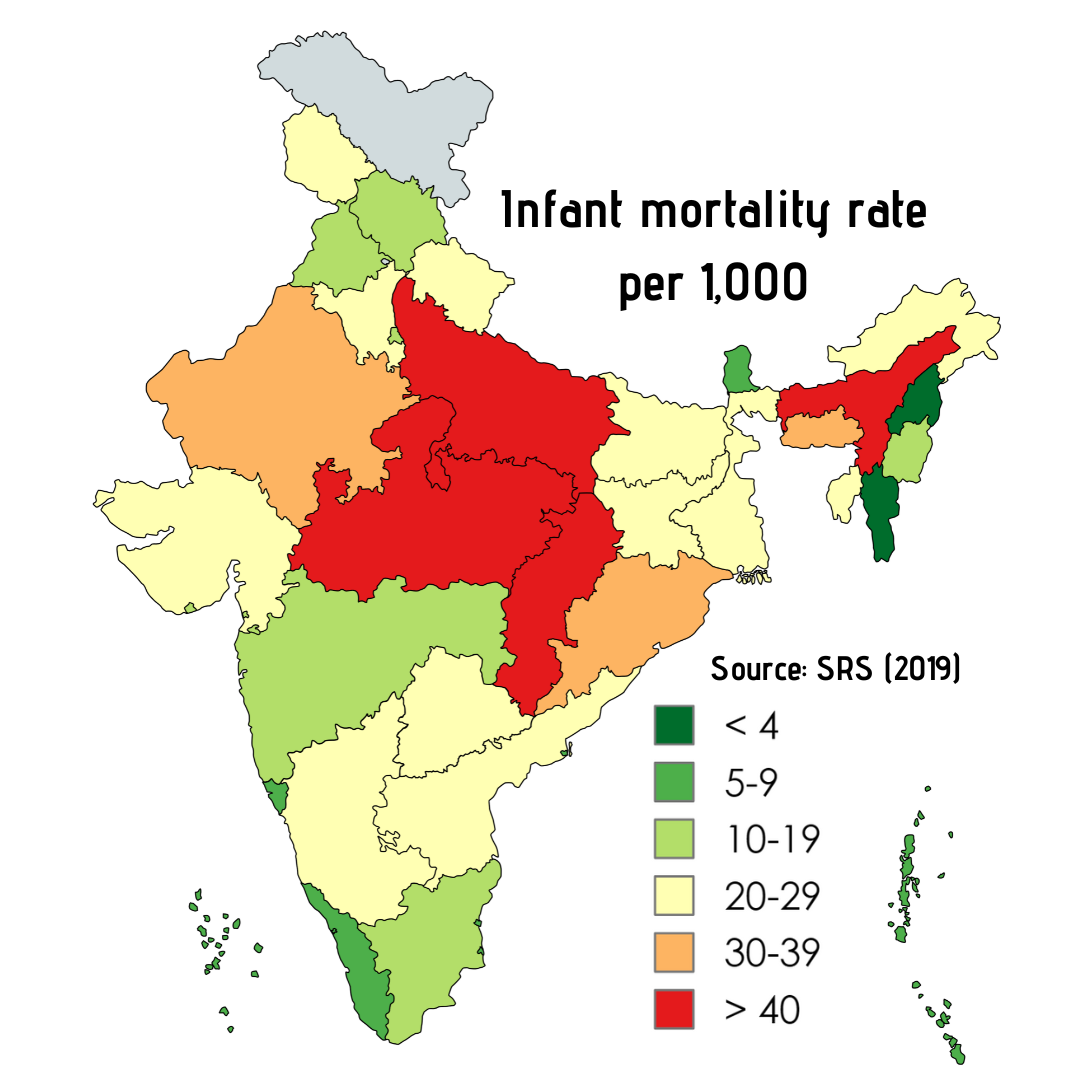
Indian states by infant mortality rate (2019)

== List ==
Rank	State	Infant mortality per 1000 births				
Rank	State	2024	2019	2015		
Rank	State	0	India	24	26	37
1	Manipur	2	10	9		
2	Lakshadweep	3	8	20		
3	Chandigarh	6	13	21		
4	Sikkim	7	5	18		
4	Goa	7	8	9		
4	Puducherry	7	9	11		
7	Kerala	8	6	12		
8	Andaman and Nicobar Islands	9	7	20		
8	Dadra and Nagar Haveli	9	11	21		
8	Daman and Diu	9	17	18		
11	Tamil Nadu	11	8	19		
11	Delhi	11	11	18		
11	Himachal Pradesh	11	19	28		
14	Nagaland	12	3	12		
14	Mizoram	12	3	32		
14	Tripura	12	21	20		
17	Maharashtra	13	17	21		
18	Jammu and Kashmir	14	20	26		
19	Karnataka	15	21	28		
20	Punjab	16	19	23		
20	West Bengal	16	20	26		
22	Telangana	17	23	34		
22	Arunachal Pradesh	17	29	30		
24	Andhra Pradesh	18	25	37		
25	Gujarat	19	25	33		
25	Uttarakhand	19	27	34		
27	Bihar	23	29	42		
28	Haryana	24	27	36		
29	Jharkhand	27	27	32		
30	Rajasthan	28	35	43		
30	Odisha	28	38	46		
32	Assam	29	40	47		
33	Meghalaya	31	33	42		
34	Uttar Pradesh	35	41	46		
34	Madhya Pradesh	35	46	50		
36	Chhattisgarh	36	40	41		
