= 2011 Socio Economic and Caste Census =

Indian government social justice agency

Socio Economic and Caste Census 2011

General information
- Country: India
- Authority: Ministry of Rural Development
- Website: secc.gov.in

Results
- Total population: 1,186,403,770

The Socio Economic and Caste Census (SECC) was conducted for the Census of India by the Ministry of Rural Development from 2011—2015. The Manmohan Singh government approved the Socio Economic and Caste Census 2011 to be carried out after discussion in both houses of Parliament in 2010. SECC-2011 was not done under the 1948 Census of India Act and the Registrar General and Census Commissioner of India was not entrusted to do the same. The SECC was conducted in all states and union territories of India and some of its findings were revealed on 3 July 2015 by Union Finance Minister Arun Jaitley. SECC 2011 is also the first paperless census in India conducted on hand-held electronic devices by the government in 640 districts. The rural development ministry has taken a decision to use the SECC data in all its programmes such as MGNREGA, National Food Security Act, and the Deen Dayal Upadhyaya Grameen Kaushalya Yojana. SECC 2011 was the first caste-based census since 1931 Census of India, and it was launched on 29 June 2011 from the Sankhola village of Hazemara block in West Tripura district.

In 2021, the central government informed that census was outdated and inaccurate following the alleged refusal to release caste data.

== History ==
Both major political parties, the Indian National Congress and the Bharatiya Janata Party had differences within the party over caste-based census. Leader of Opposition in the Lok Sabha Sushma Swaraj supported the idea of caste-based census, while then Union Home Minister P. Chidambaram was against it citing practical difficulties in counting caste while conducting the census. SECC 2011 data will also be used to identify beneficiaries and expand the direct benefit transfer scheme as part of its plans to build upon the JAM (Pradhan Mantri Jan Dhan Yojana-Aadhaar-Mobile Governance) trinity. SECC 2011 also counted other aspects like Manual scavenging and Transgender count in India. SECC 2011 was not conducted under 1948 Census of India Act, which in turn made information disclosure voluntary for citizens, and not a mandatory disclosure. Socio Economic and Caste Census 2011 was the fourth exercise conducted by Government of India to identify households living below the poverty line (BPL) in India that would get various entitlements, after three censuses in 1992, 1997 and 2002. The last BPL census was conducted in India in 2002 and the procedure adopted was to collect information on 13 indicators for every rural household and assign a mark for each of these. The first caste census was conducted in India in 1881. In January 2017, Central Government accepted recommendations to use Socio-Economic Caste Census, instead of poverty line, as the main instrument for identification of beneficiaries and transferring of funds for social schemes in rural areas.

SECC 2011 has three census components which were conducted by three separate authorities, but under the overall coordination of Department of Rural Development in the Government of India:

- Census in Rural Area has been conducted by the Department of Rural Development.
- Census in Urban areas is under the administrative jurisdiction of the Ministry of Housing and Urban Poverty Alleviation.
- Caste Census is under the administrative control of Ministry of Home Affairs: Registrar General and Census Commissioner of India.

SECC data 2011 has been referred for analysis by an expert group, headed by NITI Aayog vice-chairman Arvind Panagariya. This expert group is set up by the ministries of social justice and tribal development, before making public.

== Caste census published in July 2014 ==
Socio Economic and Caste Census 2011 conducted by the Registrar General of India has come out with 4,673,034 categories of caste, sub-caste, synonyms, different surnames, gotras in the caste and clan names. These caste data were sent to all the states in November 2014 for clubbing them to consolidate the caste count. On 28 July 2015, Government of India said that a total of 81,958,314 errors were found in caste particulars and all states and Union Territories, of which 67,381,119 errors have been rectified. However, 14,577,195 errors are yet to be rectified. A report of Parliamentary Committee on Rural Development submitted to Lok Sabha Speaker on August 31, 2016, stated that 98.87 per cent data on individuals' caste and religion is error-free. Office of the Registrar General & Census Commissioner noted incidence of errors in respect of 13,477,030 individuals out of total SECC population of 118,64,03,770.

| S.No | State | Errors |
|---|---|---|
| 1 | Maharashtra | 69.1 lakhs |
| 2 | Madhya Pradesh | 13.9 lakhs |
| 3 | West Bengal | 11.6 lakhs |
| 4 | Rajasthan | 7.2 lakhs |
| 5 | Uttar Pradesh | 5.4 lakhs |
| 6 | Karnataka | 2.9 lakhs |
| 7 | Bihar | 1.75 lakhs |
| 8 | Tamil Nadu | 1.4 lakhs |

The Census 2011 recorded 11.65 lakh rural houseless people, while in SECC their numbers were only 6.1 lakh. The provisional rural data of SECC 2011 shows Scheduled Castes at 18.46% (or 15.88 crore), Scheduled Tribes at 10.97% (9.27 crore), Others at 68.52%, and 2.04% (or 36.57 lakh) as "No Caste & Tribe" households.

== Census report of SECC 2011 ==
- There are 24.49 crore (243.9 million) households in India, of which 17.97 (179.7 million) crore live in villages. Of these, 10.74 crore households are considered as deprived.
- 5.37 crore (29.97%) households in rural areas are "landless deriving a major part of their income from manual labour".
- As many as 23,700,000 (13.25%) families in villages live in a one-room house with 'kachcha' (impermanent) walls and roof.
- 21.53%, or 38,600,000, families living in villages belong to SC/ST categories.
- 56% of India's rural households lack agricultural land.
- 36% of 884 million people in rural India are non-literate. This is higher than the 32% recorded by 2011 Census of India.
- Of the 64% literate rural Indians, more than a fifth have not completed primary school.
- 60% of the 179,100,000 rural households are deprived or poor.
- 35% of urban Indian households qualify as poor.
- 74.5% (133,400,000) of rural households survive on a monthly income of Rs 5,000 for their highest earner.
- 5.4% of rural India has completed high school.
- 3.4% of rural households have a family member who is a graduate.
- 4.6% of all rural households in India pay income tax.
- 14% of rural households are employed either with the government or the private sector.
- 180,657 households are engaged in manual scavenging for a livelihood. Maharashtra, with 63,713, tops the list of the largest number of manual scavenger households, followed by Madhya Pradesh, Uttar Pradesh, Tripura and Karnataka.
- Over 48 per cent of the Indian rural population is female.
- 44.72 crore Indians are non-literate, more than a third of its 121.08 crore population.
- Transgender people comprise 0.1% of India's rural population. The Andaman and Nicobar islands, West Bengal, Gujarat, Odisha and Mizoram have the highest proportions of transgender people.
- The military and the para-military were kept out of the SECC.
- Government of Karnataka's Socio Economic Survey 2015 conducted by the Karnataka State Commission for Backward Classes was put up on the official website. The survey was launched on 11 April 2015. 133,000 enumerators carried out the Socio Economic Survey 2015 into every village, town and street to compile data related to religion, caste, education, social and economic condition of about 6.60 crore people in Karnataka by covering about 1.26 crore families.
- Social Welfare Department of Government of Karnataka may carry out a second round of caste census for 2.37 lakh families in Bengaluru, as the survey covered only 18.8 lakh families out of total 21,16,949 families in Bengaluru, which accounts for 88.82%.
- Kerala tops in the number of people with mental ailments in India.
- 1% of rural households own a landline phone without a mobile phone, while 68.35% rural households have mobile phones as their only phone(s).

== Criticism ==
SECC 2011 data was criticised by a few experts as being unreliable. There is criticism that caste related data is deliberately withheld, similar to the religious data of 2011 Census of India. The religious data of Census 2011 was finally released by Government of India on 25 August 2015. On 13 July 2015, Lalu Prasad Yadav led a march demanding the Central government to release the findings of the SECC on caste. Politicians like M Karunanidhi and Anbumani Ramadoss too demanded to release the caste-based census data that will help to provide the key to justify the existing 69 per cent quota for backward communities in Tamil Nadu. Nitish Kumar and Veerappa Moily also accused the Central Government of withholding caste-based census data, although Union Minister Ram Vilas Paswan pitched for a comprehensive classification of caste data of SECC 2011 before its release. BJP Leader Sushil Kumar Modi called for rectification of errors in the cases of 14,600,000 people in India, including 175,000 people in Bihar before releasing the caste data. The OBCs were found to comprise 52% of the country's population by the Mandal Commission report of 1980, a figure which had shrunk to 41% by 2006 when the National Sample Survey Organisation took place. Below is the distribution of population of each Religion by Caste Categories, obtained from merged sample of Schedule 1 and Schedule 10 of available data from the National Sample Survey Organisation 55th (1999–2000) and National Sample Survey Organisation 61st Rounds (2004–05) Round Survey The number of backward castes and communities was 3,743 in the initial list of Mandal Commission set up in 1979–80. The number of backward castes in Central list of OBCs has now increased to 5,013 (without the figures for most of the Union Territories) in 2006 as per National Commission for Backward Classes.

== See also ==
- Bihar caste-based survey 2023
- Caste Census
