= Amit Kataria =

Indian Administrative Service Officer

Secretary, Department of Public Health and Family Welfare
- Incumbent
- Assumed office 22 December 2024

Secretary, Medical Education
- Incumbent
- Assumed office 22 December 2024

Commissioner of Food Safety
- Incumbent
- Assumed office 22 December 2024

Joint Secretary, Ministry of Rural Development
- In office 1 September 2021 – 2 July 2024

Personal details
- Born: October 15, 1979 (age 46) Gurgaon, Haryana, India
- Education: B.Tech in Electrical Engineering; Indian Institute of Technology Delhi
- Occupation: IAS

Amit Kataria (born 15 October 1979) is a IAS officer of 2004 batch from Chhattisgarh cadre who is serving as the Secretary of the Ministry of Health and Family Welfare and Medical Education, Chhattisgarh from 22 December 2024.

He formerly served as the Joint Secretary of Ministry of Rural Development (India) since 1 September 2021 till 2 July 2024.

== Early life ==
Khataria was born 15 October 1979 in Gurgaon, Delhi and his family is very rich in land properties.

== Personal life ==
Kataria married to Asmita Handa and he has one daughter. He completed his primary and secondary schooling at the Delhi Public School (DPS), R.K. Puram.Aftermath he pursued higher education at the Indian Institute of Technology (IIT) Delhi, where he earned a B.Tech degree in Electrical Engineering.

== Career ==
After returning from a seven-year central deputation, Amit Kataria rejoined his parent cadre, Chhattisgarh. On 22 December 2024, he was appointed Secretary, Department of Public Health and Family Welfare, Secretary, Medical Education, and given additional charge as Commissioner of Food Safety, Government of Chhattisgarh.

According to media reports, Kataria think to draw a symbolic salary of ₹1 after joining the Indian Administrative Service, stating that his primary motivation was public service rather than financial gain.

== Controversy ==
In 2015, while serving as the District Collector of Bastar, Kataria received Prime Minister Narendra Modi during an official visit wearing sunglasses and informal attire. The Chhattisgarh government subsequently issued him a show-cause notice, stating that his appearance did not conform to official protocol. The incident received widespread media coverage.
