= Census in British India =

Census of India prior to independence

Cover of Volume 17 of the 1911 census report (fully digitized file)

The Census of India prior to independence was conducted periodically from 1865 to 1941. The censuses were primarily concerned with administration and faced numerous problems in their design and conduct ranging from the absence of house numbering in hamlets to cultural objections on various grounds to dangers posed by wild animals to census personnel. The sociologist Michael Mann called the census exercise "more telling of the administrative needs of the British than of the social reality for the people of British India". The differences in the nature of Indian society during the British Raj from the value system and the societies of the West were highlighted by the inclusion of "caste", "religion", "profession" and "age" in the data to be collected, as the collection and analysis of that information had a considerable impact on the structure and politics of Indian society.

== Administrative background ==
The first modern census in the United Kingdom (of a much smaller population) had been in 1801, repeated every ten years thereafter, and this provided the pattern for the Indian process, although this threw up many different problems.

There were historical attempts to enumerate the population in parts of the Indian subcontinent as well as to assess landholdings for revenue purposes, which was then a primary consideration, as attested in the writings of Kautilya, Abul Fazl and Muhnot Nainsi. The East India Company, too, carried out quantitative exercises in various places and at various times prior to the Indian Rebellion of 1857, after which its authority to govern the country, often referred to as Company Rule, was replaced by the administrators operating under the auspices of the British Crown.

Census	Census administrator	Population enumerated (in millions)
1871	W.C. Plowden	255
1881	J.A. Baines	254
1891	J.A. Baines	287
1901	H.H. Risley	294
1911	E.A. Gait	315
1921	J.T. Marten	306
1931	J.H. Hutton	353
1941	W.W.M. Yeatts	389

The 1865 census of the North-Western Provinces is sometimes referred to as the first proper census in India. By 1872, the only administrative area of British India in which there had not been an attempt to conduct a regionwide enumeration was Bengal Province. The various limited exercises conducted prior to 1869 have been described as "fragmentary, hardly systematic and lack[ing in] any uniformity". (Note: William Wilson Hunter had commenced work on what became the Statistical Account of Bengal around 1869, but it was not completed until a few years after the first census of the whole of British India; Francis Buchanan-Hamilton was among those who had conducted earlier limited surveys in areas of India.) In 1872, the Government of India concluded the first "all-India census". However, S. C. Srivastava noted that it did not in fact cover all of India, as the princely states were not British possessions, and that it was asynchronous, being conducted between 1867 and 1872, after an initial decision in 1856 to introduce decennial enumerations from 1861, which was disrupted by the 1857 Rebellion. The first synchronous decennial census was conducted in 1881 and has continued thus since, but the 1941 exercise was severely curtailed and very little of its data was published due to World War II. The 1931 census is often considered be the last British-administered census. (Note: Perfect synchronicity was not achievable because of issues such as terrain and climate. For example, the 1931 census in Burma took place two days before the exercise was carried out in much of the rest of the country.) The report of the 1881 census comprised three volumes; that of 1931 comprised 28.

British India ceased to exist in 1947, when Partition occurred. Throughout the subcontinent, and onwards until 1961 in the Republic of India, responsibility for census operations lay with temporary administrative structures, which were established for each census and then dismantled.

Those tasked with gathering the data faced various unusual situations. Matters of culture affected even simple processes such as house numbering, with Bhil people objecting on the grounds of superstition and Burmese people on the grounds of artistry. Enumerators also faced dangerous situations, including instances of being attacked by tigers. According to the 1891 Census Commissioner, the respondents were almost all illiterate and often "unwilling and obtuse". Objections based on various rumours that the censuses were intended to introduce new taxes, aid military or labour recruitment, assist in conversions to Christianity or force migration were not uncommon, at least in the early decades. There were also incidents of violence although they tended to occur in places where tensions between native people and the British were already high.

== Role of the census ==
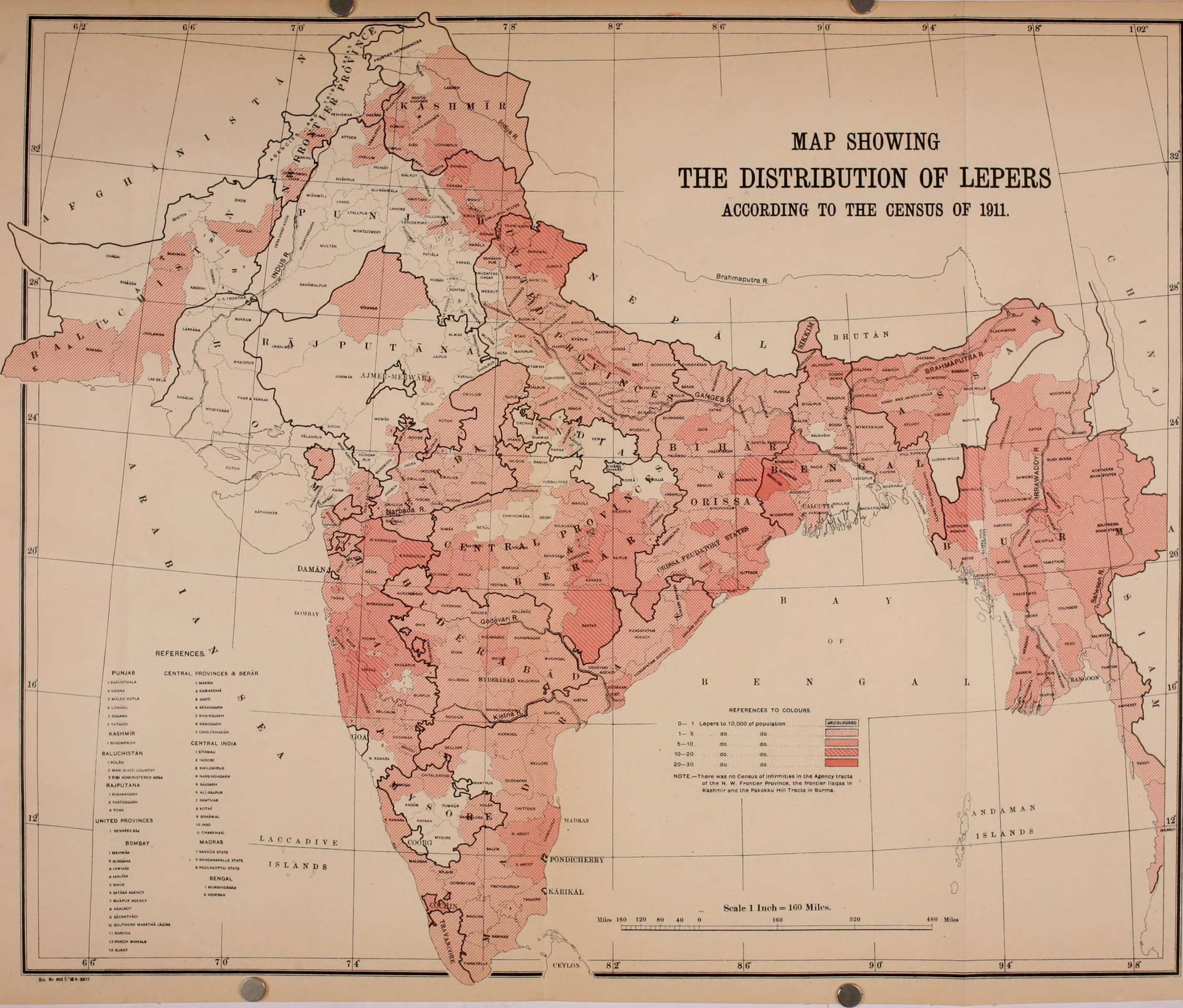
Map showing the distribution of lepers per the 1911 census

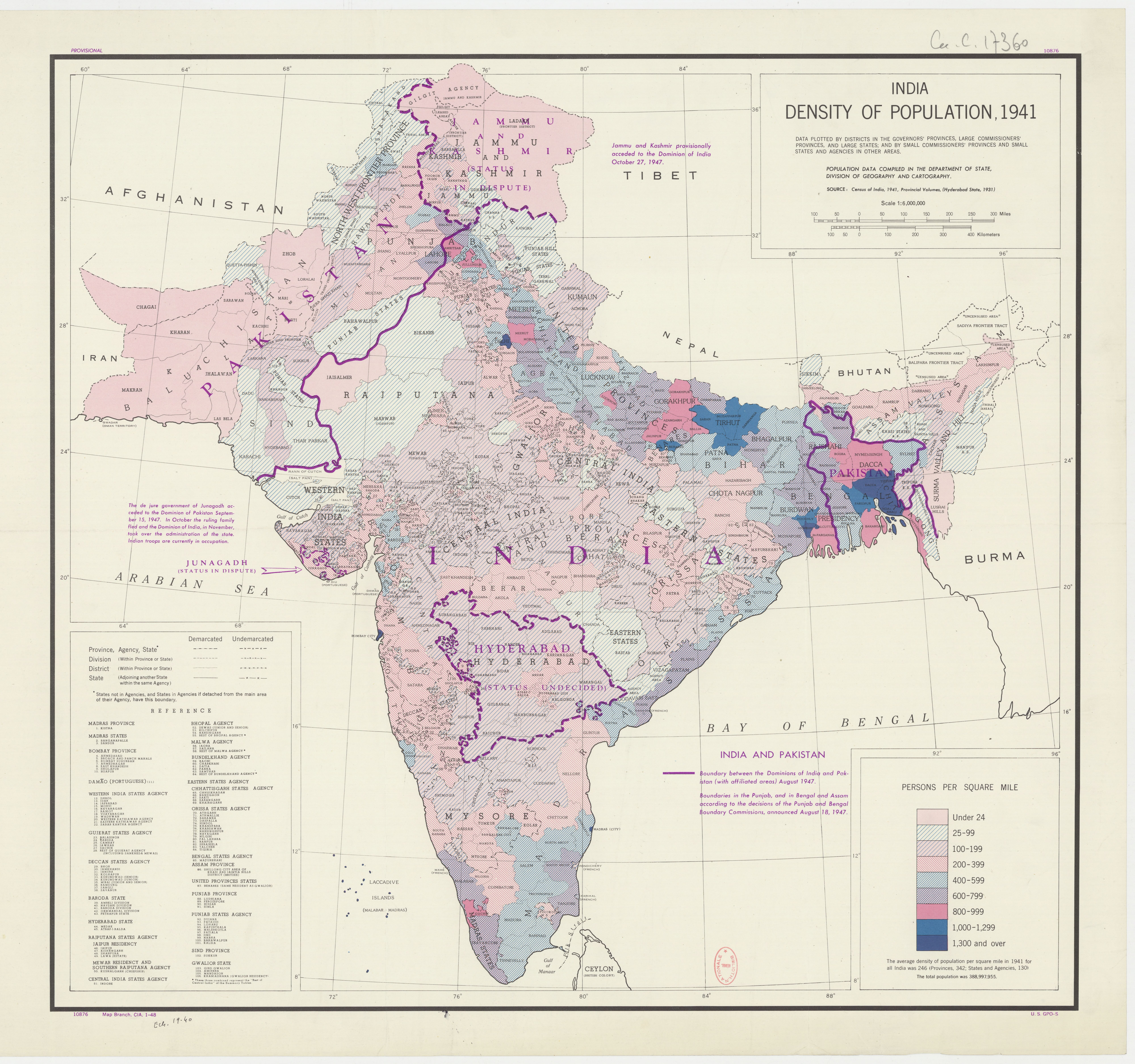
Map showing regional population density from the 1941 Census—the last census conducted by the British Indian administration.

Ram Bhagat points out that a demographic census is an exercise in the classification of a population and it is inherently constrained. For example, the questions required non-overlapping responses, and both the questions and the lists of response options were guided by preconceptions resulting from political desires or needs. The political forces may emanate from within the government machine or from interest groups that seek recognition and self-advantage. The questions and available responses, as well as the statistical and logistical methods, change over time, and the same can be true of geographical boundaries and of population identities, such as race and nationalities. However, as well as being an administrative tool, a series of censuses can act as a coalescent of the population or at least of parts of it, causing various groups within the whole to form identities in space and over time. The ability of people to classify themselves can both reinforce and create classifications with which they identify.

While the above is true of all population censuses, the nature of society in British India posed particular problems. Even the geographically smaller post-Partition India contains a myriad of languages and cultures, ethnicities and religions, many of which have evolved over several millennia. The 1931 census enumerated nearly 20 percent of the world's population, spread over 1,800,000 square miles (4,700,000 km^{2}); G. Findlay Shirras said in 1935 that was the largest such exercise in the world but "also the quickest and the cheapest". (Note: Clerical labour was cheap in India anyway, but the relatively-low costs of physically visiting and enumerating the population, relative to other countries and to the costs of tabulating the results, may have been in part from vanity. Writing in 1900, Baines stated that outside the major cities, enumerators were happy to be rewarded with a certificate acknowledging their good work and that the village officials "whose services are fortunately made available for three days or so by the simple expedient of decreeing a public holiday for the census, and turning every official thus set at liberty on to a block as near as possible to his ordinary residence. There is thus comparatively little need of outside agents, and such as are wanted can be got, on payment of out-of-pocket expenses, for the distinction of flourishing round with pen and ink and two or three torch bearers and attendants".) Scholars such as Bernard S. Cohn have argued that the censuses of the Raj period significantly influenced the social and spatial demarcations within India that exist today. The use of enumerative mechanisms such as the census, which were intended to bolster the colonial presence, may indeed have sown the seeds that grew to be independent India, but not everybody accepts that. Peter Gottschalk has stated of that cultural influence:

... classifications of convenience for government officials transformed into contested identities for the Indian public as the census went from an enumerative exercise of the British government to an authoritative representation of the social body and a vital tool of indigenous interests.

The censuses that came later were much broader and, according to Crispin Bates, "more sophisticated" attempts at social engineering. Denzil Ibbetson, the Deputy Superintendent of the census in Punjab Province in 1881, stated in his official report:

Our ignorance of the customs and beliefs of the people among whom we dwell is surely in some respects a reproach to us; for not only does that ignorance deprive European science of material which it greatly needs, but it also involves a distinct loss of administrative power to ourselves.

Administrative needs were indeed a necessity, and the imperative increased with a recognition that the 1857 Rebellion had been a significant challenge to Britain's presence in India. The shock of that caused the end of the Company Rule and also caused influential members of the Indian Civil Service, such as the folklorist Richard Carnac Temple, to think that if further discontent was to be avoided, a better understanding of the colonial subjects was needed. The censuses formed one aspect of a wider series of ethnographic studies, the categorisations of which became an essential part of the British administrative mechanism. Of those categorisations, caste was regarded as being "the cement that holds together the myriad units of Indian society", according to the 1901 Census Commissioner H. H. Risley. The role of Risley has sometimes drawn particular attention, with Nicholas Dirks stating, "Risley's anthropology worked not so much to retard nationalism as to render it communal. In so doing, it also left a bloody legacy for South Asia that continues to exact a mounting toll".

== Caste ==
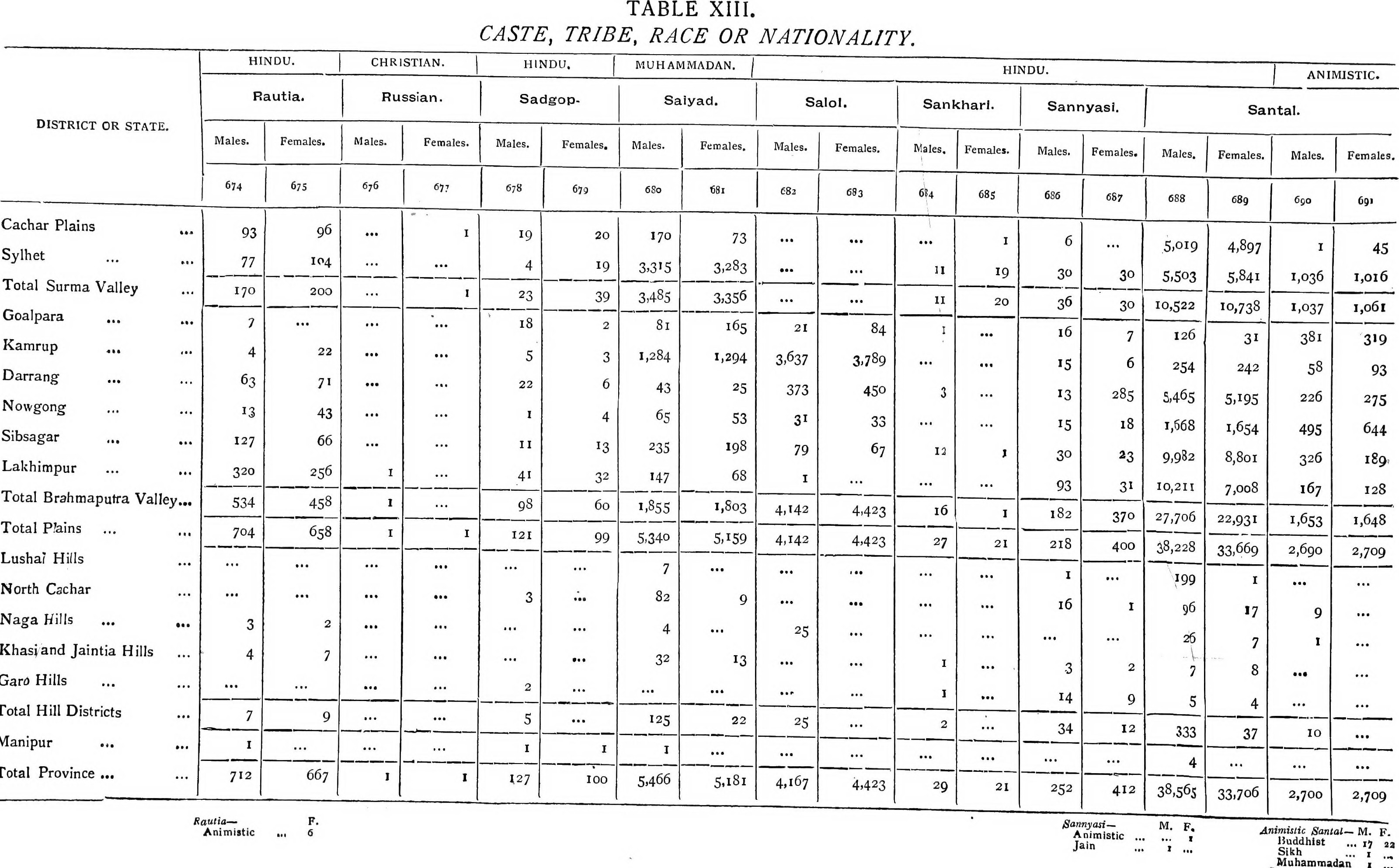
Local table for "Caste, tribe, race or nationality", from the 1901 census

Caste and religion still form the most significant social constructs in India and the former, in particular, has been influenced by the Raj census efforts. Although there were certainly some enumerations of caste prior to the arrival of the British, some modern academics, such as Cohn and Dirks, have argued that the British, through their census and other works, effectively created the caste system as it exists today. Others, such as Dipankar Gupta, reject that idea, which Gupta considers to imply that Indians had "no identity worth the name" prior to the colonial period, but he acknowledges that the Raj had a significant role in how caste is now practised. Timothy Alborn is somewhat more sceptical, but his primary concern is to refute studies based on the theories of imagined community and objectification that have emerged from the work of Benedict Anderson. He stated of the claimed objectification of caste:

... such accounts risk overstating the capacity of British census officials to control their subjects through the mere act of counting them. If age, seemingly one of the most straight-forward features of the census, posed the serious difficulties of biased reports and independent verification, concepts like "objectification" are of especially dubious value in more controversial categories like caste and ethnicity.

From the outset in 1872, there was never a formal definition of the census categories for caste, race or tribe. For example, in 1891, the Jats and Rajputs were recorded as castes and as tribes, but the category of tribe was not formally adopted until the 1901 census. The recorded details changed in every census from 1872 to 1941 and the administrators struggled to comprehend Indian culture. They relied heavily on elitist strictures through their interpretation of regional literature (Note: Literacy rates were poor. Despite improvements in education by 1931, it was calculated then that 9.5 percent of the population could read and write a postcard. Jervoise Athelstane Baines, the 1891 Census Commissioner, thought that only 2 percent of the population could fill out a census form.) and on the advice of Brahmins, who subscribed to a traditional but impractical ritual ranking system, known as varna. The reliance on elites formed part of a colonial strategy to create attachment to a national identity in an arbitrarily defined highly disparate whole. The Raj aimed to gain favour with the elites, whose position would then lead to the idea of Indian nationhood percolating through the remainder of society. However, even the concept of Brahmanic elites is tricky: Prasanta Chandra Mahalanobis has demonstrated that Bengali Brahmins were more similar to other castes in Bengal than to any of the Brahmin groups elsewhere.

There was a general presumption that the caste of a person was immutable and unchanging and that it could only apply to Hindus although Jains were also thus categorised from 1901. In 1911, the caste of Christians and Muslims was recorded if given by them. John Henry Hutton, who was Census Commissioner in 1931, stated that "tribe was provided to cover the many communities still organised on the basis in whose case the tribe has not become a caste; it was likewise determinate enough, and no attempt was made to define the term race which was generally used so loosely as almost to defy any definition". That assumptions such as immutability were inadequate was acknowledged, for example, by the 1911 Commissioner, E. A. Gait, who commented on the demonstrably obvious processes of fusion and fission in social groups that gave rise to new group identities. Similarly, Hutton noted:

a caste which had applied in one province to be called Brahman (priestly caste) asked in another to be called Rajput (warrior caste) and there are several instances at this [1931] census of castes claiming to be Brahman who claimed to be Rajputs ten years ago".

Hutton was observing the effects of a popular belief that the purpose of the census was to define the relative position of people in society. Therefore, respondents would often claim to be of a socially-superior community to that which they actually were. That misconception gave an outlet for aspirational people to seek advancement and caused the evolution, sometimes almost overnight, of completely-new social identities that often adopted the honorific titles of perceived superior groups such as Brahmins and Rajputs as part of their name. Caste associations were formed to establish the authenticity of such claims, often by inventing traditions allegedly connected to mythology and ancient history, as did the Patidars, (Note: The Patidars gained recognition as a distinct caste in the 1931 census.) and they presented what Frank Conlon has described as a "deluge" of petitions for official recognition to the census authorities. Through such recognition, they thought that they could later make political and economic gains even though, as with the Goud Saraswat Brahmins (whose claim to Brahmin status itself is contested), their associations might comprise very disparate socioeconomic groups. Frequently, the enumerators just took what people claimed for granted.

The theories of Risley, which broadly assumed that caste and race were related and were based on now-discredited methods of anthropometry and scientific racism, loomed large in attempts by Indologists and the colonial authorities to impose a Western paradigm on the census caste categories. The census administrators themselves also created caste communities in which none existed previously. In Bengal, Chandala, which was commonly used as a generic description for all low-caste people, was mistakenly used as a specific caste name by the authorities. That caused much resentment and attempts to achieve recognition as Namasudra. Castes such as Yadav and Vishwakarma appeared out of nowhere and were created as official categories for what had been geographically disparate differently named communities that happened to share traditional occupations, respectively as dairymen/grazers and craft artisans such as goldsmiths and carpenters. The Yadavs were also another example of a group that invented tradition in the process often referred to as Sanskritisation. They claimed descent from the mythological Yadu and a Kshatriya status. Their creation as a caste was aided also by the Raj's policy of grouping people who bore similar names.

Linguistic differences also presented difficulties, with different spellings and pronunciations for similar castes and administrative attempts to create language-based caste categories that had not been known. George Grierson's Linguistic Survey of India had recorded 179 languages and 544 dialects, while the 1931 census, which covered a somewhat more extensive area, noted 225 languages.

The 1872 and 1881 censuses attempted to classify people fundamentally according to the Varna mentioned in ancient texts. The broad caste basing proved not to reflect the realities of social relationships, but it was met with approval from scholars of Sanskrit and ancient texts. It also did not apply throughout the country. (Note: The caste system in southern India, such as that found in Kerala, is very different from that of northern India.. The 1931 census recorded 50 million such people as "depressed classes", representing 14 percent of the population recorded.) Furthermore, as Ibbetson and others in the Punjab realised after 1872, the Brahmanic system had no practical purpose from an administrative point of view. In 1881, Punjab abandoned the primary categorisation by varna that was used in other British Indian jurisdictions in that year and preferred instead to assign more weight to the category of occupation. In 1891, the other jurisdictions followed suit.

Attempts continued to recognise the broad socio-economic implications of the varna system, but they were also applied inconsistently. William Chichele Plowden, the Commissioner in 1881, designated categories of Brahmans, Rajputs, Castes of Good Social Position, Inferior Castes and Non-Hindus or Aboriginal Castes; in 1921, the category of "depressed classes" was used; and in 1931 the nomenclature became "exterior classes".

The 1901 census recorded 1646 distinct castes, which increased to 4147 in 1931. (Note: The oft-criticised The People of India project that began in the 1990s and relied heavily on Raj ethnographies, recorded 4635 castes.)

The first census results came in 1872. During the 1941 census, it was decided to merge the different caste groups under a single monolithic category – Hindu.

- Hinduism
- Islam
- Tribal religions
- Buddhism
- Sikhism
- Jainism
- Christianity
- Zoroastrianism
- Judaism
- Others

== Religion and occupation ==
The significance of religion, as well as caste, was considerable. Hutton said in his census report for 1931 that

It is not in its devotional aspect that the census is concerned with religion.... [S]ocial conduct is much influenced by practices which may not be in themselves religious but which are subject to religious sanctions. The age of marriage, the practice of remarriage, the observance of purdah, the occupations of women, the inheritance of property and the maintenance of widows, even diet, to name a few obvious cases, vary according to the caste and the religious community of the individual. The time will no doubt come when occupation will serve the purpose at present served by religion and caste in presenting demographic data, but that time is not yet, and at the present moment their barriers have not so far decayed that their social importance can be ignored for public purposes.

Despite the general ruling that caste was restricted to Hindus, which was later modified to include Jains, there were over 300 recorded Christian castes, and more than 500 castes were Muslim. The definition of Hindu, Sikh and Jain religious beliefs was always blurred, and even the Christian and Muslim believers could cause difficulties with classification although they were usually more easily defined. Kolis in Bombay worshipped both Hindu idols and the Christian Holy Trinity, and Kunbis in Gujarat were known to follow both Hindu and Muslim rituals and caused the census to classify them as socially Hindus but Muslim by faith. The Raj had also introduced constitutional changes that gave certain groups political representation. That led to events such as that in the 1931 census. According to Shirras,

Feeling ran so high over the return of religion in the Punjab that some exterior castes, asked by one party to register as Hindus, by others as Sikhs, and even as Moslems, declared themselves Ad Dharmi or "adherents of the original religion," whatever that may be.

Religious groups in British India (1872−1941)
Year	Hinduism (Note: 1872 census: Includes all "Hindu" (187,937,450 persons), "Brahmo" (1,147 persons), "Satnami" (398,409 persons), "Kabirpanthi" (347,994 persons), and "Kumbhipatia" (913 persons) responses. 1891 census: Includes all "Brahmanic" (207,688,724 persons), "Arya" (39,952 persons), and "Brahmo" (1,147 persons) responses. 1901 census:Includes all "Brahmanic" (207,050,557 persons), "Arya" (92,419 persons), and "Brahmo" (4,050 persons) responses. 1911 census: Includes all "Brahmanic" (217,337,943 persons), "Arya" (243,445 persons), and "Brahmo" (5,504 persons) responses. 1921 census: Includes all "Brahmanic" (216,260,620 persons), "Arya" (467,578 persons), and "Brahmo" (6,388 persons) responses. 1931 census: Includes all "Brahmanic" (219,300,645 persons), "Arya" (990,233 persons), "Brahmo" (5,378 persons), "Ad-Dharmi" (418,789 persons), and "Other Hindu" (18,898,884 persons) responses. 1941 census: Includes all "Scheduled Caste" (48,813,180 persons), "Ad-Dharmi" (349,863 persons), and "Other Hindu" (206,117,326 persons) responses.)		Islam		Buddhism		Sikhism		Christianity (Note: 1941 census: Includes all "Indian Christian" (6,040,665 persons), "Anglo-Indian" (140,422 persons), and "Other Christian" (135,462 persons) responses.)		Zoroastrianism		Judaism		Tribal (Note: 1881 census: Includes all "Tribal" (6,426,511 persons) and "Nat Worship" (143,581 persons) responses.)		Jainism		Others (Note: 1872 census: Includes all "Others" (5,025,721 persons) and "Not Known" (425,175 persons) responses. 1891 census: Includes all "Unitarians" (5 persons), "Theists" (47 persons), "Deists" (12 persons), "Atheists" (27 persons), "Freethinkers" (5 persons), "Agnostics" (69 persons), "Positivists" (2 persons), "No religion" (18 persons), and "Religion not Returned" (42,578 persons) responses. 1931 census: Includes all "No religion" (153 persons), "Indefinite Beliefs" (940 persons), "Chinese (Confucian, Ancestor Worship, and Taoist)" (150,240 persons), and "Others" (1,065 persons) responses.)		Total population
Year	pop.	%	pop.	%	pop.	%	pop.	%	pop.	%	pop.	%	pop.	%	pop.	%	pop.	%	pop.	%	Total population
1872	139,248,568	73.07%	40,882,537	21.45%	2,832,851	1.49%	1,174,436	0.62%	896,658	0.47%	69,476	0.04%	7,626	0.004%	—N/a	—N/a	—N/a	—N/a	5,450,896	2.86%	190,563,048
1881	188,685,913	74.32%	50,121,585	19.74%	3,418,884	1.35%	1,853,426	0.73%	1,862,634	0.73%	85,397	0.03%	12,009	0.005%	6,570,092	2.59%	1,221,896	0.48%	59,985	0.02%	253,891,821
1891	207,731,727	72.32%	57,321,164	19.96%	7,131,361	2.48%	1,907,833	0.66%	2,284,380	0.8%	89,904	0.03%	17,194	0.01%	9,280,467	3.23%	1,416,638	0.49%	42,763	0.01%	287,223,431
1901	207,147,026	70.37%	62,458,077	21.22%	9,476,759	3.22%	2,195,339	0.75%	2,923,241	0.99%	94,190	0.03%	18,228	0.01%	8,584,148	2.92%	1,334,148	0.45%	129,900	0.04%	294,361,056
1911	217,586,892	69.4%	66,647,299	21.26%	10,721,453	3.42%	3,014,466	0.96%	3,876,203	1.24%	100,096	0.03%	20,980	0.01%	10,295,168	3.28%	1,248,182	0.4%	37,101	0.01%	313,547,840
1921	216,734,586	68.56%	68,735,233	21.74%	11,571,268	3.66%	3,238,803	1.02%	4,754,064	1.5%	101,778	0.03%	21,778	0.01%	9,774,611	3.09%	1,178,596	0.37%	18,004	0.01%	316,128,721
1931	239,613,929	68.36%	77,677,545	22.16%	12,786,806	3.65%	4,335,771	1.24%	6,296,763	1.8%	109,752	0.03%	24,141	0.01%	8,280,347	2.36%	1,252,105	0.36%	152,398	0.04%	350,529,557
1941	255,280,369	66.02%	92,058,096	23.81%	232,003	0.06%	5,691,447	1.47%	6,316,549	1.63%	114,890	0.03%	22,480	0.01%	25,441,489	6.58%	1,449,286	0.37%	60,014	0.02%	386,666,623

== Recording age ==
As with caste, recording age in the census amounted to a problematic attempt to impose Western values on the population. Most people in British India did not know their age anyway, and the few who did, mostly Brahmins, were often reluctant to divulge the information with the degree of accuracy that was common in Britain and other Western countries. (Note: Baines noted in 1900 that in some "high class" households, "domestic privacy is a matter of social honour". He also noted that some suspicion regarding age recording existed in some European countries, where it was felt that the detail might be used for the purpose of determining military service.) The nature of time had a different meaning to the people of India, who considered age to be a bureaucratic device and were more concerned with practical measures of time, such as the demarcations of natural disasters, a tendency to measure life by harvests and the cultural impact of puberty that starkly differentiated adults from children. Other cultural influences included the zodiac and a tendency among Brahmins to understate the age of unmarried late-teenage daughters because for them not to have been married by that time implied a dereliction of parental and religious duty, which would consign the parents to a torrid period between death and reincarnation. Also, Indians were not very good at estimating the age of others, which made it difficult for census enumerators to assess or to correct the information with which they were supplied. (Note: In one recorded instance, native census enumerators used figures varying between 16 and 60 when they were asked to estimate the age of a specific person.)

In parallel with the introduction of censuses, the campaign to end infanticide led to the first formal attempts to register births, marriages and deaths. Legislation for that purpose was enacted between 1866 and 1872, but the system was underresourced and reliant on village officials. Although the registration processes improved over the years, they were significantly disrupted at times, notably when officials were preoccupied in dealing with famines and, from the 1920s onward, by the actions of the Indian independence movement.

The problems of registration, age irrelevance and ignorance were known to the census authorities, whose officials produced tables that demonstrated statistically implausible spikes and age distributions from the 1880s onward. They came to recognise that the issues were exacerbated by a misunderstanding, with the populace often being unconvinced that the submitted data was not used at a personal level but was rather aggregated for analysis. Those issues could not easily be corrected because there were also significant variances caused by periodic outbreaks of famine and diseases such as cholera and influenza, as well as the very imperfect system of registering life events. (Note: The officials employed to make sense of the raw age data were in fact actuaries, whose more usual work took place on behalf of life assurance companies. Among the many statistical oddities was the population's liking for certain numbers; in 1911, 56 percent of respondents were found to have ages ending in 0, 2 or 5. The correlation of registration records to census data also revealed improbabilities, with discrepancies suggesting that 60 percent or more of life events were going unrecorded, causing one actuary in 1911 to remark that system was "practically useless". The 1911 census in Bombay Presidency suggested that the population had risen by 1.1 million, but the birth and death records indicated a fall of 217,469. The difference could not be attributed to migration. (Note: Permanent migration was uncommon anyway. Cultural constraints, such as caste endogamy, tended to limit its effects, but it was important to try to arrange the date of the census so that it minimised clashes with major religious festivals and melas that might result in large temporary movements. Temporary economic migration (nomadic groups, seasonal harvesting, people working on construction projects and suchlike) certainly took place.) In 1931, there was an inexplicable difference of 4.6 million births between census and registration records.) Attempts at correction were made, but the figures remained unreliable throughout the Raj period, and perhaps worse, the attempts to correct them in the official reports were not always based on sound methodology. Amartya Sen is among those who have been criticised for allegedly failing to appreciate the underlying statistical problems in the published data. Noting that some of the officials queried even trying to impose the age category, Alborn noted:

The response of actuaries to the challenge of inadequate Indian age returns between the Bengali census of 1871 and the final British-administered all-India census of 1931 was not very different from the recent critical work of historians and demographers about such unstable census-data categories as "occupation" or "race." As much as possible, they made do with what they had, all the while preaching caution about the shaky empirical foundation on which their charts and graphs were built.

== Outcomes ==
The outcomes of the census exercise were sometimes startling. For example, the 1872 census in Bengal suggested that the population was considerably greater than had been believed. A supervisor there noted that it "rose in one day from 42 to 67 millions" and that the Lieutenant-Governor "suddenly found that he had unconsciously been the ruler of an additional population more than equal to that of the whole of England and Wales". Proposed benefits such as improvements in public health and targeted famine relief, (Note: In Madras Presidency, between the censuses of 1871 and that of 1921, detailed caste-based occupation data were mentioned to estimate the impact of famines on lower castes.) but they were often not realised in those particular instances because the poor data relating to age (mortality rates, as an example) prevented the sort of mapping of the population that over time was improving the well-being of the British populace.

The Journal of the Statistical Society of London stated that the 1872 census "must be regarded more as a creditable, and in the main successful attempt to deal with an exceptionally difficult subject, than as a complete or reliable statement of a class of facts". Among the problems, which were noted as "surely... some grave error", was the seemingly inexplicable figure for the "diseased and starved" population in Orissa, which had suffered a famine that was estimated to have caused the deaths of around a third of its three million people but whose numbers within five years exceeded the pre-famine total. The information provided for religion was described as "not altogether reliable, the Hindoos being probably over-estimated, the Mahomedans under-rated, and with the exceptions of the Christians, the Jews, and the Parsees, the remainder being more or less conjectural". The figures for caste and nationality were also described as "for the most part conjectural". The 1872 census was, in the opinion of Crispin Bates,

...by far the least structured census ever conducted in the subcontinent and a printer's nightmare, since rather than fit the population into pre-determined categories census takers asked relatively open-ended questions about religious beliefs and occupations. The result was a proliferation of columns concerning occupations in particular. Individuals appeared as 'con-man', 'pimp', 'prostitute', 'idiot' and 'thief', or however else they might appear or describe themselves. Worse still, castes and tribes were listed as to whether they were 'animist', Christian, Hindu or Mohammedan, with little structure or system beyond the self-representation of the respondents.

That caste should not be treated as a fixed designation is now commonly recognised since new groups come and go, and there are movements between groups. Bhagat describes them as "fluid, fuzzy and dynamic historically" and gives as an example the emergence in the early 20th century of the Kamma and Reddy castes through coalescence of like-minded, politically motivated groups.

Despite its variability, the published information relating to age caused significant angst among social reformers, notably in relation to the Child Marriage Restraint Act (Sarda Act) of 1929. (Note: The Sarda Act imposed penalties for marriage of girls under the age of 14 and boys under the age of 18. It led to incorrect data being supplied regarding age and marriage status in areas such as Baroda and Kashmir.) The legislation had been supported by the 1931 Census Commissioner, Hutton, who had noticed a declining trend in the custom of child marriages and saw the act as encouraging the decline. Eleanor Rathbone, a prominent campaigner for women's rights and a believer that the Raj authorities were not getting to grips with Indian social issues, used figures from the 1931 census to support her misguided claim that such marriages were not in decline and that the act had caused a significant spike in the numbers. She claimed that there had been a 50 percent increase in wives under the age of 15 and a quadrupling of wives under 5 years old since 1921, and that the lives of women were being blighted. She thought Indians incapable of helping themselves and in need of firmer instruction from British authorities, who should enforce change, rather than merely encourage it. In turn, debates such as those, based on untrustworthy information, informed opinions about Indian nationalism and the role of Britain generally in the country. Rathbone herself was confronted by Rama Rau, an Indian feminist, who said that the British were simply not well-placed to understand Indian culture and that "educated Indian women were working in every province of their country to eradicate social evils and outmoded customs and prejudices, and we refused to accept the assertion that the removal of social evils in Indian society was the responsibility of the British".

== See also ==
- Government of India Act 1858
