= Delimitation Bill, 2026 =

Indian bill

Parliament of India
- Long title: A Bill to provide for the readjustment of the allocation of seats in the House of the People to the States and Union territories, the total number of seats in the Legislative Assembly of each State and Union territories having a Legislative Assembly, the division of each State and each Union territory having a Legislative Assembly into territorial constituencies for elections to the House of the People and Legislative Assemblies of the States and Union territories and for matters connected therewith.
- Territorial extent: India
- Enacted by: Lok Sabha

Legislative history
- Bill title: Delimitation Bill, 2026
- Bill citation: Bill No. 108 of 2026
- Introduced by: Arjun Ram Meghwal, MoS(I/C) for Law & Justice and MoS of Parliamentary Affairs
- Introduced: 16 April 2026
- Status: Rejected in committee by the Lok Sabha

The Delimitation Bill, 2026, was introduced in Lok Sabha on 16 April 2026 by Arjun Ram Meghwal, the Minister of Law. The bill intends to increase the number of seats in the Lok Sabha from 543 to 850. 815 of the 850 members will be elected from the States and 35 members will be elected from the Union territories. The bill allows for the constitution of the Delimitation Commission of India to undertake the exercise of delimitation before the completion of the 2027 census of India, thus facilitating a shorter time for the reservation of seats for women in the Lok Sabha and the legislative assemblies.

== Criticism ==
On 17 April 2026, during the special session of the Lok Sabha, Shashi Tharoor stated that linking the Delimitation to the Women's Quota Act "is to hold the aspirations of Indian women hostage".

== Government explanation ==
Home Minister of India Amit Shah assured the members of Lok Sabha that the representation of southern States in the House would not decrease. He stated the number of Lok Sabha seats in the five southern States would go up from the existing 129 to 195, with the share increasing from 23.76 per cent to 23.87 per cent.
