= Caste census =

Type of census in India

General information
- Country: India
- Topics: Census topics: Caste
- Authority: Ministry of Home Affairs, Government of India

Results
- Proposed and Announced on: 30 April 2025
- Part of: Upcoming decadal census in India (due since 2021)

Caste census is a census to be conducted in India by the Central Government of India. The proposed census was decided under the leadership of Prime Minister Narendra Modi by the cabinet committee of political affairs (CCPA) on 30 April 2025. It has been decided that a caste enumeration should be included with the 2027 census of India. The exact time has not been declared yet.

The decision of the cabinet was announced by the Central Railway Minister Ashwini Vaishnaw. It has been seen as a step that would help in drafting "equitable and targeted" policies by the present Central Government of India led by the Bhartiya Janta Party in India. The Central Home Minister Amit Shah has described the decision as a "historic decision". He has also described that the historic decision as “committed to social justice”.

== Description ==
The caste census is a systematic recording of individuals’ caste identities during the nationwide census in the country. The Central minister Ashwini Vaishnaw expressed his view on the proposed census and said that it would "strengthen the social and economic structure of our society while the nation continues to progress”.

The Caste census will happen for the first time in 100 years by the Central Government of India. It will be the part of the 2027 census of India in India.

== History ==
According to Peabody, the first systematic caste-wise enumeration of households in the Indian subcontinent was conducted between 1658 and 1664 across seven districts of the then Marwar Kingdom, including Jodhpur city which was its capital. It was conducted by the then home minister Munhata Nainsi of the kingdom for the purpose of tax documentation. It was not to for classification of society or creation of social hierarchies but solving a tax related problem. During the period of the British rule in India, caste census was included in the decadal censuses to categorise the population by caste, religion and occupation. In 1871–72, the first detailed caste census was conducted by the government of British Raj in India. It was practiced between the period 1881 to 1931. The last caste census was conducted in the year 1931 in which 4,147 castes were recorded. After the independence of India, the caste enumeration was stopped by the newly independent Government of India led by the prime minister Pandit Jawaharlal Nehru in 1951. The caste enumeration was stopped to avoid reinforcing social divisions in the Indian society. But, there was an exception made for the enumeration of the Scheduled Castes (SCs) and Scheduled Tribes (STs) in the decadal censuses. Therefore, the enumeration of the Scheduled Castes and the Scheduled Tribes is being conducted in every census since 1951. In 1961, the Government of India permitted states for conducting their own surveys to compile OBC lists, but national caste census was not conducted.

In 2010, the Bhartiya Janata Party supported caste-based census.

By 2022, a number of political parties including Janata Dal United, Congress, Rashtriya Janata Dal, All India Majlis-e-Ittehadul Muslimeen (AIMIM) demanded caste-based census.

In 2025, Indian government announced it will conduct caste census after nearly a century. The leader of opposition Rahul Gandhi has welcomed the decision. He said "We have shown we can pressure govt" He has demanded a clear timeline for its completion. He has called it "The first step towards deep social reform".

In 2026, it was announced that the 2027 census of India will contain an "open column" (a column, which is an open-ended question) to enter the caste. A "pre-test" was carried out to decide on the actual metodology.. See "2027 census of India § Caste enumeration" for more.

== See also ==
- Census of India
- Next census of India
- 2011 census of India
- 2011 Socio Economic and Caste Census
- 2022 Bihar caste-based survey

Related articles

- Demographics of India
- Reservation in India
- Caste system in India
