= Constitution (131st Amendment) Bill, 2026 =

Indian bill

The Constitution (One Hundred and Thirty-First Amendment) Bill, 2026, was introduced in Lok Sabha on 16 April 2026 by Arjun Ram Meghwal, the Union Minister of Law & Justice. The bill sought to implement one-third reservation for women in the Lok Sabha as well as the assemblies of States. It would have operationalised the One Hundred and Sixth Amendment of the Constitution of India, which promised nearly one-third (33%) reservation after the first census following the amendment. The statement of objects and reasons of the bill stated that: “The next census and the consequential delimitation exercise thereafter will take considerable time and thus, delay the effective and dedicated participation by women in our (India's) democratic polity.”

The bill intended to operationalise one-third reservation for women through a delimitation exercise based on the 2011 census. It was introduced along with the Delimitation Bill, 2026, which sought to increase the maximum number of seats from 550 at present to 850—up to 815 members elected from states, and up to 35 from union territories. The bill failed in the Lok Sabha on 17th April 2026, with 298 votes in favour and 230 votes against the bill.
