= William Walter Murray Yeatts =

William Walter Murray Yeatts (died 4 August 1948) was Census Commissioner for the 1941 census of India, which was the last such exercise prior to the country's independence from the British Raj. He was appointed to the same office for the 1951 census, having elected to stay in the country, but died before it took place.

Yeatts was educated in Edinburgh, Scotland. In 1914, following being awarded a degree, he joined the Royal Artillery and served during World War I. He then joined the Indian Civil Service in Madras. Between 1932 and 1946 he held various positions in the Government of India, culminating in his appointments as Census Commissioner for the 1941 and 1951 censuses of that country. He had previously been involved in the 1931 census of Madras Presidency.

His oversight of the 1941 census was inauspicious, in part because of the limitations imposed by the onset of World War II and in part because of significant changes that he was persuaded to make to the methodology. A keen sportsman, although aloof, his term as president of the Himalayan Club was also affected by the war, with the club's activities being necessarily curtailed.

Yeatts was made a Companion of the Order of the Indian Empire in 1938 and a Companion of the Order of the Star of India in 1946. He died in Edinburgh on 4 August 1948.
