= 2011 census of India =

15th Indian census

15th census of India
- 9 to 28 February 2011
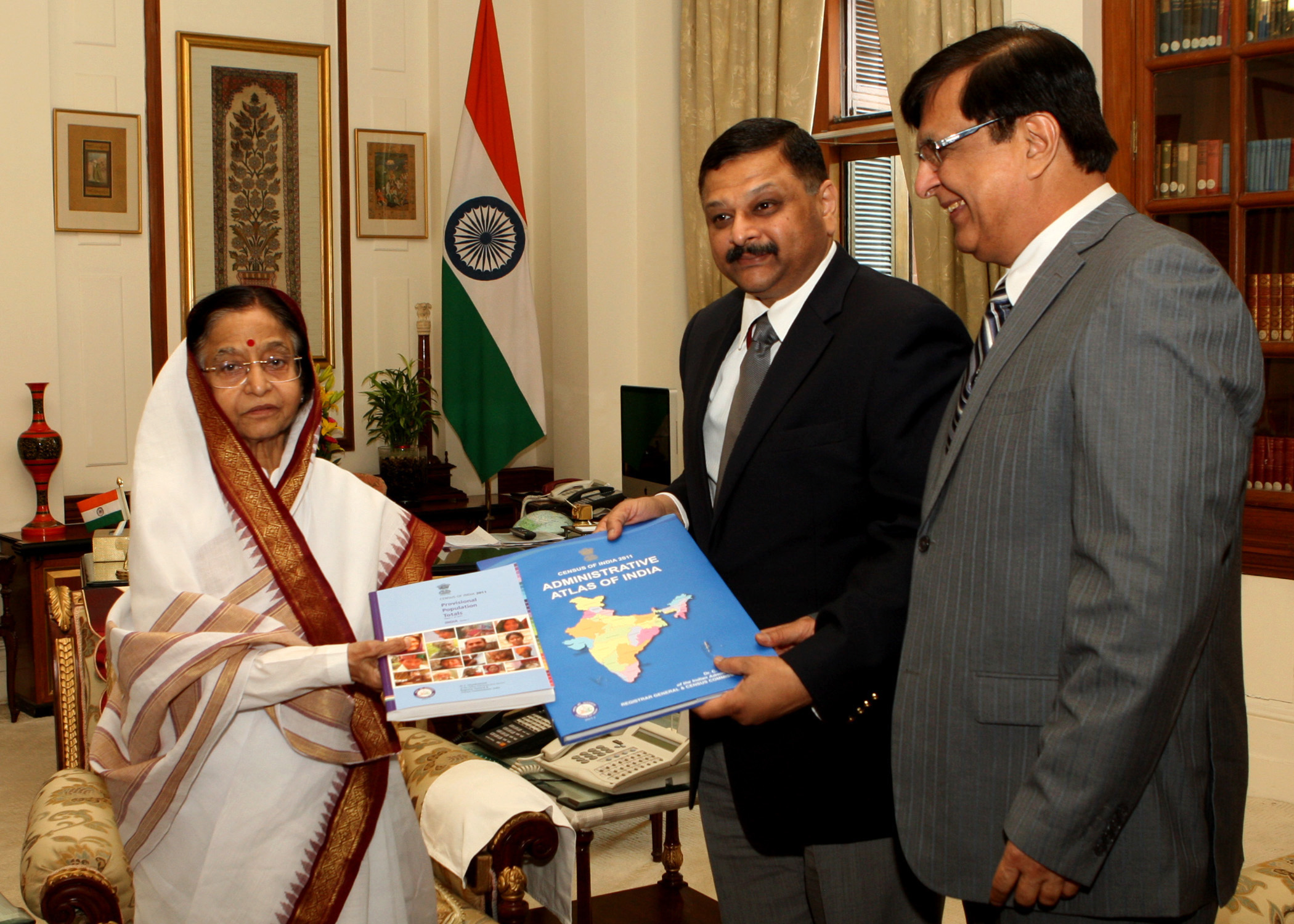
- President of India Pratibha Patil receiving the 2011 census report from the Census Commissioner C. Chandramouli

General information
- Country: India
- Authority: RGCCI
- Website: censusindia.gov.in

Results
- Total population: 1,261,224,952 (▲17.7%)
- Most populous state: Uttar Pradesh (199,812,341)
- Least populous state: Sikkim (610,577)
- Densest state: Bihar (1102 per km²)
- Least dense state: Arunachal Pradesh (17 per km²)

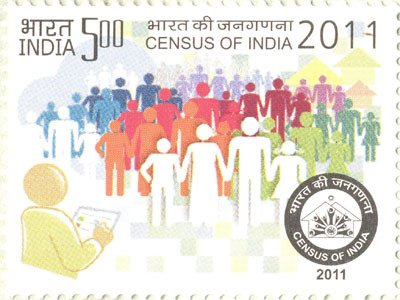
Postage stamp dedicated to the 2011 census of India

The 2011 census of India or the 15th Indian census was conducted in two phases, house listing and population enumeration. The House listing phase began on 1 April 2010 and involved the collection of information about all buildings. Information for National Population Register (NPR) was also collected in the first phase, which will be used to issue a 12-digit unique identification number to all registered Indian residents by Unique Identification Authority of India. The second population enumeration phase was conducted between 9 and 28 February 2011. Census has been conducted in India since 1872 and 2011 marks the first time biometric information was collected. According to the provisional reports released on 31 March 2011, the Indian population increased to 1.21 billion with a decadal growth of 17.70%. Adult literacy rate increased to 74.04% with a decadal growth of 9.21%. The motto of the census was Our Census, Our Future.

Spread across 28 states (Note: Prior to the creation of Telangana.) and 8 union territories, the census covered 640 districts, 5,924 sub-districts, 7,935 towns and more than 600,000 villages. A total of 2.7 million officials visited households in 7,935 towns and 600,000 villages, classifying the population according to gender, religion, education and occupation. The cost of the exercise was approximately ₹2,200 crore (US$230 million) – this comes to less than US$0.50 per person, well below the estimated world average of US$4.60 per person.

Information on castes was included in the census following demands from several ruling coalition leaders including Lalu Prasad Yadav, and Mulayam Singh Yadav supported by opposition parties Bharatiya Janata Party, Shiromani Akali Dal, Shiv Sena and All India Anna Dravida Munnetra Kazhagam. Information on caste was last collected during the British Raj in 1931. During the early census, people often exaggerated their caste status to garner social status and it is expected that people downgrade it now in the expectation of gaining government benefits. Earlier, there was speculation that there would be a caste-based census conducted in 2011, the first time in 80 years (last was in 1931), to find the exact population of the "Other Backward Classes" (OBCs) in India. This was later accepted and the Socio Economic and Caste Census 2011 was conducted whose first findings were revealed on 3 July 2015 by Central Finance Minister Arun Jaitley. Mandal Commission report of 1980 quoted OBC population at 52%, though National Sample Survey Organisation (NSSO) survey of 2006 quoted OBC population at 41%.

There is only one other instance of a caste count in post-independence India. It was conducted in Kerala in 1968 by the Government of Kerala under E. M. S. Namboodiripad to assess the social and economic backwardness of various lower castes. The census was termed Socio-Economic Survey of 1968 and the results were published in the Gazetteer of Kerala, 1971.

== History ==
C. Chandramouli IAS was the Registrar General and Census Commissioner of India for the 2011 Indian census. Census data was collected in 16 languages and the training manual was prepared in 18 languages. In 2011, India and Bangladesh also conducted their first-ever joint census of areas along their border. The census was conducted in two phases. The first, the house-listing phase, began on 1 April 2010 and involved collection of data about all the buildings and census houses. Information for the National Population Register was also collected in the first phase. The second, the population enumeration phase, was conducted from 9 – 28 February 2011 all over the country. The eradication of epidemics, the availability of more effective medicines for the treatment of various types of diseases and the improvement in the standard of living were the main reasons for the high decadal growth of population in India.

== Information ==
=== House-listings ===
The House-listing schedule contained 35 questions.

1. Building number / Census house number
2. Predominant material of floor, wall and roof of the census house
3. Ascertain use of actual house
4. Condition of the census house
5. Household number
6. Total number of persons in the household
7. Name of the head of the household
8. Sex of the head
9. Caste status (SC or ST or others)
10. Ownership status of the house
11. Number of dwelling rooms
12. Number of married couples in the household
13. Main source of drinking water
14. Availability of drinking water source
15. Main source of lighting
16. Latrine within the premises
17. Type of latrine facility
18. Waste water outlet connection
19. Bathing facility within the premises
20. Availability of kitchen
21. Fuel used for cooking
22. Radio/Transistor
23. Television
24. Computer/Laptop
25. Telephone/Mobile phone
26. Bicycle
27. Scooter/Motor cycle/Moped
28. Car/Jeep/Van
29. Availing Banking services

=== Population enumeration ===
The Population enumeration schedule contained 30 questions.

1. Name of the person
2. Relationship to head
3. Sex
4. Date of birth and age
5. Current marital status
6. Age at marriage
7. Religion
8. Scheduled Caste/Scheduled Tribe
9. Disability
10. Mother tongue
11. Other languages known
12. Literacy status
13. Status of attendance (Education)
14. Highest educational level attained
15. Working any time during last year
16. Category of economic activity
17. Occupation
18. Nature of industry
19. Trade or service
20. Class of worker
21. Non economic activity
22. Seeking or available for work
23. Travel to place of work
24. Birthplace
25. Place of last residence
26. Reason for migration
27. Duration of stay in the place of migration
28. Children surviving
29. Children ever born
30. Number of children born alive during last one year

=== National Population Register ===
The National Population Register household schedule contained 9 questions.

1. Name of the person and resident status
2. Name of the person as should appear in the population register
3. Relationship to head
4. Gender
5. Date of birth
6. Marital status
7. Educational qualification
8. Occupation/Activity
9. Names of father, mother and spouse

Once the information was collected and digitised, fingerprints were taken and photos collected. Unique Identification Authority of India was to issue a 12-digit identification number to all individuals and the first ID have been issued in 2011.

== Census report ==
Decadal growth of Indian population (1901–2011).

2011 census density map of India, by state and UT.

Provisional data from the census was released on 31 March 2011 (and was updated on 20 May 2013). Transgender population was counted in population census in India for the first time in 2011. The overall sex ratio of the population is 943 females for every 1,000 males in 2011. The official count of the third gender in India is 490,000

Population	Total	1,261,224,952
Population	Males	653,724,568
Population	Females	607,500,164
Literacy	Total	74%
Literacy	Males	82.10%
Literacy	Females	65.46%
Density of population	per km^{2}	382
Sex ratio	per 1000 males	943 females
Child sex ratio (0–6 age group)	per 1000 males	919 females

== Population ==
The population of India as per 2011 census was 1,261,224,952. India added 181.5 million to its population since 2001, slightly lower than the population of Brazil. India, with 2.4% of the world's surface area, accounts for 17.5% of its population. Uttar Pradesh is the most populous state with roughly 200 million people. Over half the population resided in the six most populous states of Uttar Pradesh, Maharashtra, Bihar, West Bengal, Andhra Pradesh and Madhya Pradesh. Of the 1.21 billion Indians, 833 million (68.84%) live in rural areas while 377 million stay in urban areas. 453.6 million people in India are migrants, which is 37.8% of total population.

India is home to many religions such as Hinduism, Islam, Christianity, Buddhism, Sikhism and Jainism. It also is to several indigenous faiths and tribal religions which have been practiced alongside major religions for centuries. According to the 2011 census, the total number of households in India is 248.8 million. Of which 202.4 million are Hindu, 31.2 million are Muslim, 6.3 million are Christian, 4.1 million are Sikh, and 1.9 million are Jain. According to 2011 census, there are around 3.01 million places of worship in India.

Population distribution in India by states
State / Union Territory (UT)	Capital	Type	Population		Males	Females	Sex Ratio	Literacy rate (%)	Population		Area (km^{2})	Density (1/km^{2})	Decadal Growth% (2001–11)
State / Union Territory (UT)	Capital	Type	number	% of total	Males	Females	Sex Ratio	Literacy rate (%)	Rural	Urban	Area (km^{2})	Density (1/km^{2})	Decadal Growth% (2001–11)
Uttar Pradesh	Lucknow	State	199,812,341	16.50%	104,480,510	95,331,831	912	67.68%	155,111,022	44,470,455	240,928	828	20.1%
Maharashtra	Mumbai	State	112,374,333	9.28%	58,243,056	54,131,277	929	82.34%	61,545,441	50,827,531	307,713	365	16.0%
Bihar	Patna	State	104,099,452	8.60%	54,278,157	49,821,295	918	61.80%	92,075,028	11,729,609	94,163	1,102	25.1%
West Bengal	Kolkata	State	91,276,115	7.54%	46,809,027	44,467,088	950	76.26%	62,213,676	29,134,060	88,752	1,030	13.9%
Andhra Pradesh	Hyderabad	State	84,580,777	6.99%	42,442,146	42,138,631	993	67.02%	56,361,702	28,219,075	275,045	308	10.9%
Madhya Pradesh	Bhopal	State	72,626,809	6.00%	37,612,306	35,014,503	931	69.32%	52,537,899	20,059,666	308,245	236	20.3%
Tamil Nadu	Chennai	State	72,147,030	5.96%	36,137,975	36,009,055	996	80.09%	37,189,229	34,949,729	130,058	555	15.6%
Rajasthan	Jaipur	State	68,548,437	5.66%	35,550,997	32,997,440	928	66.11%	51,540,236	17,080,776	342,239	201	21.4%
Karnataka	Bengaluru	State	61,095,297	5.05%	30,966,657	30,128,640	973	75.36%	37,552,529	23,578,175	191,791	319	15.7%
Gujarat	Gandhinagar	State	60,439,692	4.99%	31,491,260	28,948,432	919	78.03%	34,670,817	25,712,811	196,024	308	19.2%
Odisha	Bhubaneshwar	State	41,974,218	3.47%	21,212,136	20,762,082	979	72.87%	34,951,234	6,996,124	155,707	269	14.0%
Kerala	Thiruvananthapuram	State	33,406,061	2.76%	16,027,412	17,378,649	1,084	94.00%	17,445,506	15,932,171	38,863	859	4.9%
Jharkhand	Ranchi	State	32,988,134	2.72%	16,930,315	16,057,819	948	66.41%	25,036,946	7,929,292	79,714	414	22.3%
Assam	Dispur	State	31,205,576	2.58%	15,939,443	15,266,133	958	72.19%	26,780,526	4,388,756	78,438	397	16.9%
Punjab	Chandigarh	State	27,743,338	2.29%	14,639,465	13,103,873	895	75.84%	17,316,800	10,387,436	50,362	550	13.7%
Chhattisgarh	Raipur	State	25,545,198	2.11%	12,832,895	12,712,303	991	70.28%	19,603,658	5,936,538	135,191	189	22.6%
Haryana	Chandigarh	State	25,351,462	2.09%	13,494,734	11,856,728	879	75.55%	16,531,493	8,821,588	44,212	573	19.9%
Delhi	Delhi	UT	16,787,941	1.39%	8,887,326	7,800,615	868	86.21%	944,727	12,905,780	1,484	11,297	21%
Jammu and Kashmir	Jammu(winter); Srinagar(summer)	State	12,541,302	1.04%	6,640,662	5,900,640	889	67.16%	9,134,820	3,414,106	222,236	56	23.7%
Uttarakhand	Dehradun	State	10,086,292	0.83%	5,137,773	4,948,519	963	79.63%	7,025,583	3,091,169	53,483	189	19.2%
Himachal Pradesh	Shimla	State	6,864,602	0.57%	3,481,873	3,382,729	972	82.80%	6,167,805	688,704	55,673	123	12.8%
Tripura	Agartala	State	3,673,917	0.30%	1,874,376	1,799,541	960	87.22%	2,710,051	960,981	10,486	350	14.7%
Meghalaya	Shillong	State	2,966,889	0.25%	1,491,832	1,475,057	989	74.43%	2,368,971	595,036	22,429	132	27.8%
Manipur	Imphal	State	2,721,756	0.21%	1,290,171	1,280,219	992	79.21%	1,899,624	822,132	22,327	122	18.7%
Nagaland	Kohima	State	1,978,502	0.16%	1,024,649	953,853	931	79.55%	1,406,861	573,741	16,579	119	−0.5%
Goa	Panaji	State	1,458,545	0.12%	739,140	719,405	973	88.70%	551,414	906,309	3,702	394	8.2%
Arunachal Pradesh	Itanagar	State	1,383,727	0.11%	713,912	669,815	938	65.38%	1,069,165	313,446	83,743	17	25.9%
Puducherry	Pondicherry	UT	1,247,953	0.10%	612,511	635,442	1,037	85.85%	394,341	850,123	479	2,598	27.7%
Mizoram	Aizawl	State	1,097,206	0.09%	555,339	541,867	976	91.33%	529,037	561,997	21,081	52	22.8%
Chandigarh	Chandigarh	UT	1,055,450	0.09%	580,663	474,787	818	86.05%	29,004	1,025,682	114	9,252	17.1%
Sikkim	Gangtok	State	610,577	0.05%	323,070	287,507	890	81.42%	455,962	151,726	7,096	86	12.4%
Andaman and Nicobar Islands	Port Blair	UT	380,581	0.03%	202,871	177,710	876	86.63%	244,411	135,533	8,249	46	6.7%
Dadra and Nagar Haveli	Silvassa	UT	343,709	0.03%	193,760	149,949	774	76.24%	183,024	159,829	491	698	55.5%
Daman and Diu	Daman	UT	243,247	0.02%	150,301	92,946	618	87.10%	60,331	182,580	112	2,169	53.5%
Lakshadweep	Kavaratti	UT	64,473	0.01%	33,123	31,350	946	91.85%	14,121	50,308	32	2,013	6.2%
India			1,264,224,952	100%	623,724,248	586,469,174	943	74.04%	833,087,662	377,105,760	3,287,240	382	17.64%

== Religious demographics ==
The religious data on India census 2011 was released by the Government of India on 25 August 2015. Hindus are 79.8% (966.3 million) while Sikhs are 20.8 million comprising 1.72% of the population, Muslims are 14.23% (172.2 million) in India and Christians are 2.30% (28.7 million). According to the 2011 census of India, there are 57,264 Parsis in India. For the first time, a "No religion" category was added in the 2011 census. 2.87 million were classified as people belonging to "No Religion" in India in the 2011 census, 0.24% of India's population of 1.21 billion. Given below is the decade-by-decade religious composition of India until the 2011 census. There are six religions in India that have been awarded "National Minority" status – Muslims, Christians, Sikhs, Jains, Buddhists and Parsis. Sunnis, Shias, Bohras, Agakhanis and Ahmadiyyas were identified as sects of Islam in India. As per 2011 census, six major faiths – Hindus, Muslims, Christians, Sikhs, Buddhists, Jains make up over 99.4% of India's 1.21 billion population, while "other religions, persuasions" (ORP) count is 8.2 million. Among the ORP faiths, six faiths – 4.957 million-strong Sarnaism, 1.026 million-strong Gond, 506,000-strong Sari, Donyi-Polo (302,000) in Arunachal Pradesh, Sanamahism (222,000) in Manipur, Khasi (138,000) in Meghalaya dominate. Maharashtra is having the highest number of non-religious in the country with 9,652 such people, followed by Kerala.

Population trends for major religious groups in India (1951–2011)
Year	Hindus	Muslims	Christians	Sikhs	Buddhists	Jains	Zoroastrians	Atheists or other religion
1951	84.1%	9.8%	2.3%	1.79%	0.74%	0.46%	0.13%	0.8%
1961	83.45%	10.69%	2.44%	1.79%	0.74%	0.46%	0.09%	0.8%
1971	82.73%	11.21%	2.60%	1.89%	0.70%	0.48%	0.09%	0.41%
1981	82.30%	11.75%	2.44%	1.92%	0.70%	0.47%	0.09%	0.42%
1991	81.53%	12.61%	2.32%	1.94%	0.77%	0.40%	0.08%	0.44%
2001	80.46%	13.43%	2.34%	1.87%	0.77%	0.41%	0.06%	0.8%
2011	79.80%	14.23%	2.37%	1.72%	0.70%	0.37%	0.05%	0.9%
%±	▼5.12%	▲45.21%	▲3.04%	▼3.91%	▼5.41%	▼19.56%	▼61.53%	▲12.51%

== Language demographics ==
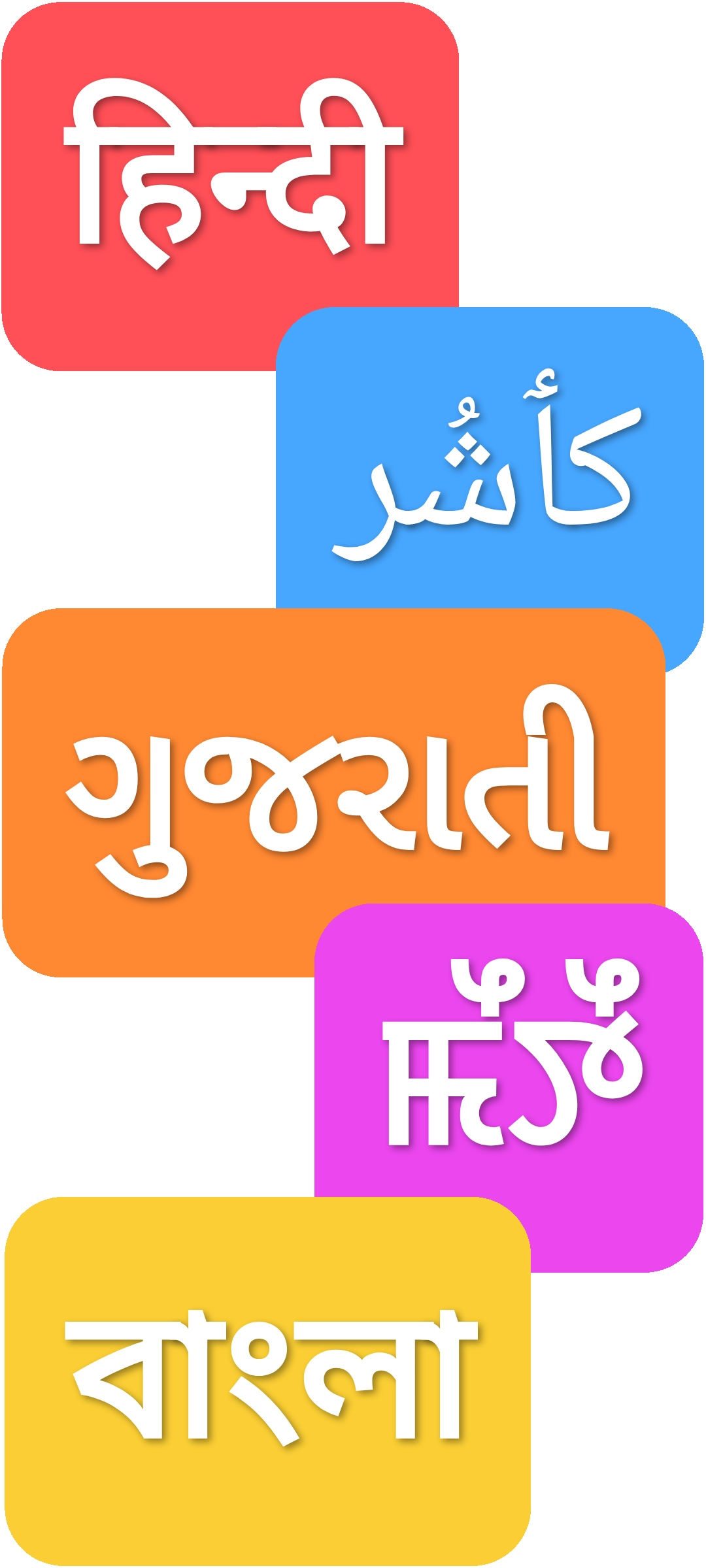
Fastest growing languages of India — Hindi (first), Kashmiri (second), Gujarati & Meitei/Manipuri (third), Bengali (fourth) — based on 2011 census of India

The 2011 Census of India reported 121 languages having over 10,000 speakers, constituting 1.20 billion (~99%) of the population, consolidated from 1,369 classified and 1,474 unclassified forms out of 19,569 raw mother tongue entries recorded from respondents. Out of 121 languages, 22 languages designated as scheduled language of India, which spoken by 96.71 percent of population as mother tongue. The language data was released on 26 June 2018. As per census, 57.1% of Indian population know Hindi, in which 43.63% of Indian people have declared Hindi as their native language or mother tongue. However, the census takes the widest possible definition of "Hindi" as a broad variety of "Hindi languages" which is widely spoken language in northern parts of India. Hindi is the fastest growing language of India, followed by Kashmiri in the second place, with Meitei (officially called Manipuri) as well as Gujarati, in the third place, and Bengali in the fourth place, according to the 2011 census of India.

The 2011 census report on bilingualism and trilingualism, which provides data on the two languages in order of preference in which a person is proficient other than the mother tongue, was released in September 2018. The number of bilingual speakers in India is 314.9 million, which is 26% of the population in 2011. 7% of Indian population is trilingual. Hindi, Bengali speakers are India's least multilingual groups.

First, Second, and Third languages by number of speakers in India (2011 census)
Language	First language speakers		Second language speakers	Third language speakers	Total speakers	
Language	num.	% of total pop.	Second language speakers	Third language speakers	num.	% of total pop.
Hindi	528,347,193	43.63%	139,207,180	24,000,000	692,000,000	57.1%
English	259,678	0.02%	83,125,221	46,000,000	129,000,000	10.6%
Bengali	97,237,669	8.3%	9,037,222	1,000,000	107,000,000	8.9%
Marathi	83,026,680	7.09%	13,000,000	3,000,000	99,000,000	8.2%
Telugu	81,127,740	6.93%	12,000,000	1,000,000	95,000,000	7.8%
Tamil	69,026,881	5.89%	7,000,000	1,000,000	77,000,000	6.3%
Urdu	50,772,631	4.34%	11,000,000	1,000,000	63,000,000	5.2%
Gujarati	55,492,554	4.74%	4,000,000	1,000,000	60,000,000	5%
Kannada	43,706,512	3.73%	14,000,000	1,000,000	59,000,000	4.94%
Odia	37,521,324	3.2%	5,000,000	390,000	43,000,000	3.56%
Punjabi	33,124,726	2.83%	2,230,000	720,000	36,600,000	3%
Malayalam	34,838,819	2.97%	500,000	210,000	36,000,000	2.9%
Maithili	13,063,042	1.08%	400,000	130,000	13,583,464	1.12%
Sanskrit	24,821	<0.01%	1,230,000	1,960,000	3,190,000	0.19%

== Literacy ==
Any individual above age seven who can read and write in any language with an ability to understand was considered literate. In censuses before 1991, children below the age five were treated as illiterates. The literacy rate taking the entire population into account is termed as "crude literacy rate", and taking the population from age seven and above into account is termed as "effective literacy rate". Effective literacy rate increased to a total of 74.04% with 82.14% of the males and 65.46% of the females being literate.

Effective literacy rate (1901–2011)
S.No.	Census year	Total (%)	Male (%)	Female (%)
1	1901	5.35%	9.83%	0.60%
2	1911	5.92%	10.56%	1.05%
3	1921	7.16%	12.21%	1.81%
4	1931	9.50%	15.59%	2.93%
5	1941	16.10%	24.90%	7.30%
6	1951	16.67%	24.95%	9.45%
7	1961	24.02%	34.44%	12.95%
8	1971	29.45%	39.45%	18.69%
9	1981	36.23%	46.89%	24.82%
10	1991	42.84%	52.74%	32.17%
11	2001	64.83%	75.26%	53.67%
12	2011	74.04%	82.14%	65.46%

== See also ==
- Socio Economic and Caste Census 2011
- Demography of India
- Irreligion in India
- Scheduled Castes and Scheduled Tribes
- Other Backward Class
- Caste Census
