= Delimitation Act, 2002 =

2002 Indian law

Parliament of India
- Long title: An Act to provide for the readjustment of the allocation of seats in the House of the People to the States, the total number of seats in the Legislative Assembly of each State, the division of each State and each Union territory having a Legislative Assembly into territorial constituencies for elections to the House of the People and Legislative Assemblies of the States and Union territories and for matters connected therewith.
- Citation: Act No. 33 of 2002
- Territorial extent: India
- Passed by: Lok Sabha
- Passed: 7 May 2002
- Passed by: Rajya Sabha
- Passed: 15 May 2002
- Assented to by: President K. R. Narayanan
- Assented to: 3 June 2002
- Commenced: 3 June 2002

Legislative history

First chamber: Lok Sabha
- Bill title: Delimitation Bill, 2002
- Introduced by: Arun Jaitley, Minister of Law, Justice and Company Affairs
- Introduced: 3 May 2002
- Passed: 7 May 2002

Second chamber: Rajya Sabha
- Passed: 15 May 2002

Repeals
- Delimitation Act, 1972

Amended by
- Delimitation (Amendment) Act, 2003; Delimitation (Amendment) Act, 2008; Election Laws (Amendment) Act, 2016; Jammu and Kashmir Reorganisation Act, 2019
- Status: In force (amended)

The Delimitation Act, 2002 (Act No. 33 of 2002) is an act of the Parliament of India to replace the Delimitation Act, 1972.

== Amendments ==
The Election Laws (Amendment) Bill, 2016, introduced by Law Minister D. V. Sadananda Gowda, seeks to amend Section 11 of the Delimitation Act, 2002. Once passed, the proposed Bill will enable the Election Commission to carry out a limited delimitation of assembly and parliamentary constituencies in Cooch Behar district of West Bengal following the India–Bangladesh enclaves exchange of 51 Bangladeshi and 111 Indian enclaves in July 2015. The enclaves were exchanged pursuant to the 1974 Land Boundary Agreement and 2011 Protocol and Instruments of Ratification during Prime Minister Narendra Modi's visit to Bangladesh on 6–7 June 2015.
