= Ministry of Rural Development =

Ministry of Rural Development may refer to:

- Ministry of Rural Development (Bolivia)
- Ministry of Rural Development (Cambodia)
- Ministry of Rural Development (Hungary)
- Ministry of Rural Development (India)

== See also ==
- List of agriculture ministries
