= Ethnic groups in Kerala =

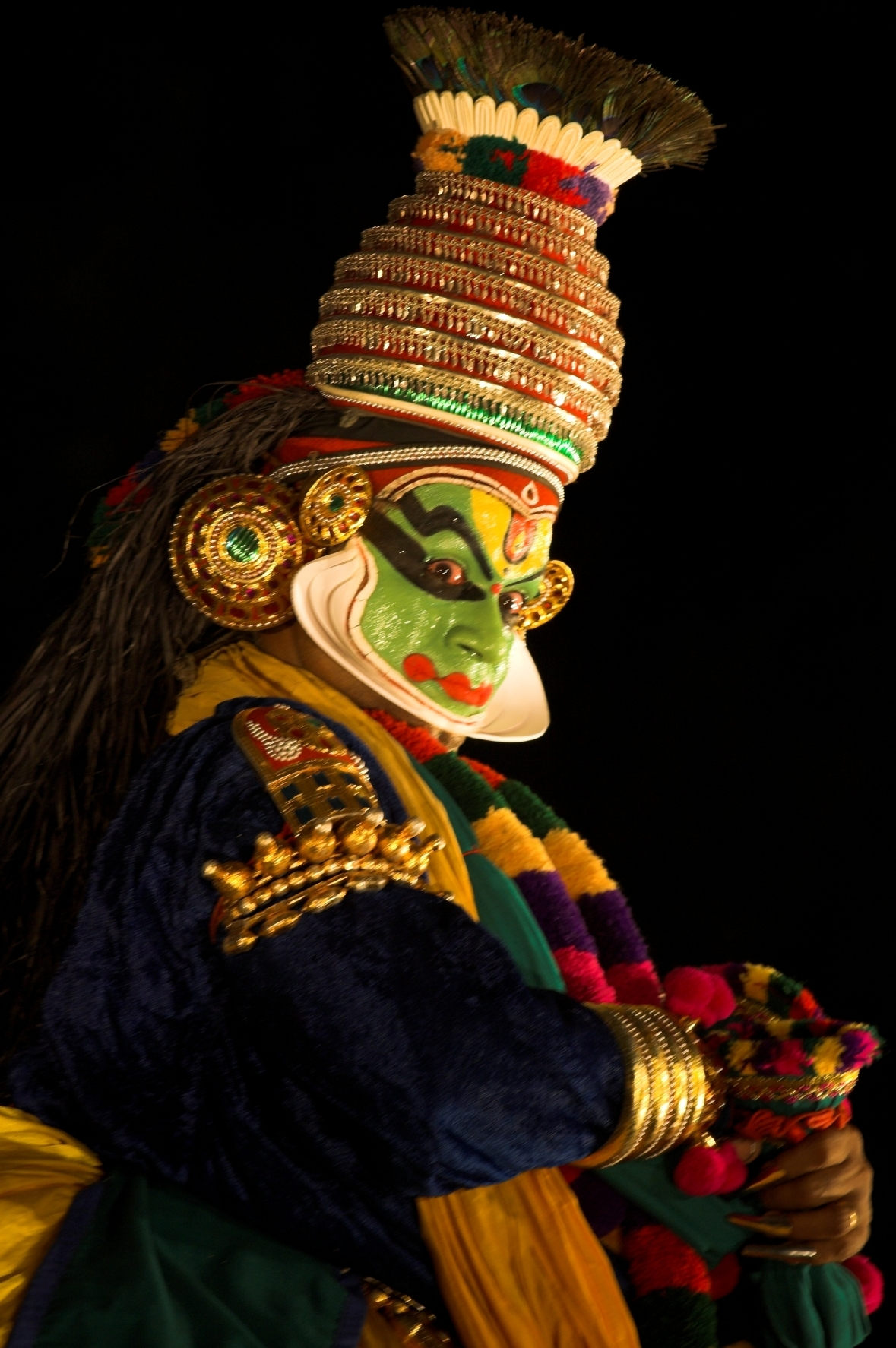
Kathakali is popular art form in Kerala

The population of Kerala, India is a heterogenous group that comprises many ethnic groups that originated in other parts of India as well as the world, with distinctive cultural and religious traditions. While the majority of Keralites speak the Malayalam language, various ethnic groups may speak other languages as well.

The racial and ethnic history of Kerala is highly controversial and disputed among the cultural anthropologists, historians and other scholars. The people of Kerala, known as Malayali (people speaking Malayalam language), are polygenetic and belong to different ethnic groups and religions. The Census of India does not recognise racial or ethnic groups within India. According to a 2009 study published by David Reich et al., the modern Indian population is composed of two genetically divergent and heterogeneous populations which mixed in ancient times, known as Ancestral North Indians (ANI, Indo-Aryan-speaking population) and Ancestral South Indians (ASI, Dravidian-speaking population).

== Malayali ==
Malayalis are the native people of Kerala who speak Malayalam, the official language of the state. The Malayalam language is a Dravidian language which is spoken by 45 million people. Similar to other major languages, modern Malayalam includes loanwords from Arabic, Portuguese, and in more recent times English. While the majority of Malayalis live in Kerala, significant populations also exist in other parts of India, the Middle East, Europe and North America. According to the Indian census of 2011, there were 32,413,213 speakers of Malayalam in Kerala, making up 97.03% of the total population of the state.

The majority (about 54%) of the Malayali people are Hindu, mostly of the Ezhavar, Ambalavasi, Namboothiri, Nair, Malayali Brahmin, Thiyyar, Kammalar, Ezhuthachan, Vishwakarma, Pulayar or Cheramar, Parayar or Sambavar, Mukkuvar, Vellalar, and Nadar communities, but there are also large Muslim (24%) and Christian (18%) communities. The Muslim community in Kerala, trace their origins far back to early contacts with Arab traders after the advent of the Muhammed in the Arabian peninsula, and mostly follow the Shafi`i school of Sunni Islam. Many speak the distinctive Jonaka Mappila dialect of Malayalam.

The majority of Christians belong to the Saint Thomas Christian community, and are also known as Syrian(Syriac)Christians(suriyani Christiani) (or Nasrani Mappila). Thomas the Apostle reached the trade route of Muziris in 52 AD, and preached Christianity.

== Tamil ==
The history of ancient Kerala is deeply intertwined with ancient Tamilagam, and the Tamil and Malayalam languages are closely related. The dialect of Malayalam spoken today in the taluks of Chittur and Palakkad in Kerala has slight tamil influence due to mixing with tamil migrants living in the region and the tamil spoken by Palakkad iyers has large number of Malayalam loanwords, has been influenced by Malayalam syntax and also has a distinct Malayalam accent.

Some of the earliest migrations attested by history were those of Iyers from the Cauvery delta to the district of Palakkad. The first of these migrations are believed to have taken place over five hundred years ago. Although the Iyers migrated to Kerala, they were not allowed to carry out poojas in Malayali temples. The reason for this was political as well as the difference in the Agama and Tantric modes of worship employed by Kerala Iyers and Nambudiris respectively. As a result, the Nambudiris used to require ritual purification if coming into contact with a Kerala Iyer (Eda Shuddham). These Iyers settled in Palakkad where they owned land and led an affluent existence till the enactment of the land reforms in the 1960s. There have also been migrations of Iyers to the princely state of Travancore from the Tirunelveli district during the 18th and 19th centuries. These Iyers are called Kerala Iyers and differ significantly from Palakkad Iyers in their language and social status. Some of Travancore's diwans were Tamil Brahmins as a result of Madras presidency being under the direct control of the British.

== Tulu ==
Shivalli Brahmins living all over the Indian state of Kerala are part of the larger Tulu Brahmin subsect primarily found in the Indian state of Karnataka but also in the Kasaragod district of Northern Kerala. Their mother tongue is the Tulu language. Brahmins from Tulunadu may have migrated to Kerala before the first century C.E.

Today, there is a sizeable Tulu Brahmin population in Thiruvananthapuram and elsewhere in the state.

== Kannada ==
Kannada is one of the major languages of India, spoken predominantly in the state of Karnataka. The Kannada people number roughly 50 million, making it the fifteenth-most spoken language in the world. It is one of the official languages of India and the official and administrative language of the state of Karnataka. Kannada people constitute a small portion of the population of the district of Kasargod in North Kerala.

== Konkanis ==
Cochin GSB's are a branch of the Konkani language-speaking Gaud Saraswat Brahmins community belonging originally to Karnataka and Goa. They form the majority of Konkani-speakers in Kerala. GSBs of Cochin form the southernmost subsect of Saraswat Brahmins of West coast. GSBs of north Kerala are same as GSBs of Canara in speech and customs, whereas GSBs of Cochin and Travancore have developed their own Konkani dialect and Customs, which distinguish them from rest of GSB community, this subsect is now called Cochin GSBs. In geographical terms, Cochin GSBs are those who live south of Thrissur district of Kerala. Other Konkani speaking minorities in Kerala include the Kudumbis, Daivajnas, and the Vaishya Vani. All these groups had migrated from Goa within last few centuries for various socioeconomic reasons.

== Mahls ==
There are about 10,000 speakers of the Mahl language in Kerala. Most Mahl speakers are temporary resident people from neighbouring Maldives. Other Mahl speakers are from Indian island of Minicoy and most of them live in Trivandrum.

== Smaller minority groups ==
=== Gujaratis ===
There are about 500 Gujarati families living for many generations in Kochi, the commercial hub of Kerala. Gujarati community is composed of various social groups like Jains, Saurashtrians and Kutchis. The Gujarati Street at Mattancherry in the city is a main Gujarati cultural icon in Kerala. Calicut, Trichur, and Cannore also have a sizeable population of Hindu and Jain Gujaratis. They are basically business people doing all forms of wholesale and retail trade. There is a Gujarati Higher Secondary School near Calicut Beach.

=== Sikhs ===
Kochi is home to the Punjabi speaking Sikh community in Kerala as the coastal city has the most number of Sikhs in the south Indian state. Many of the Kerala's Punjabi Sikh community are in the automobile spare parts industry.

=== Other minorities ===
Kerala also have a small number of scattered Bengali, Bihari and Oriya communities.

== List of mother tongues spoken in Kerala by number of speakers ==
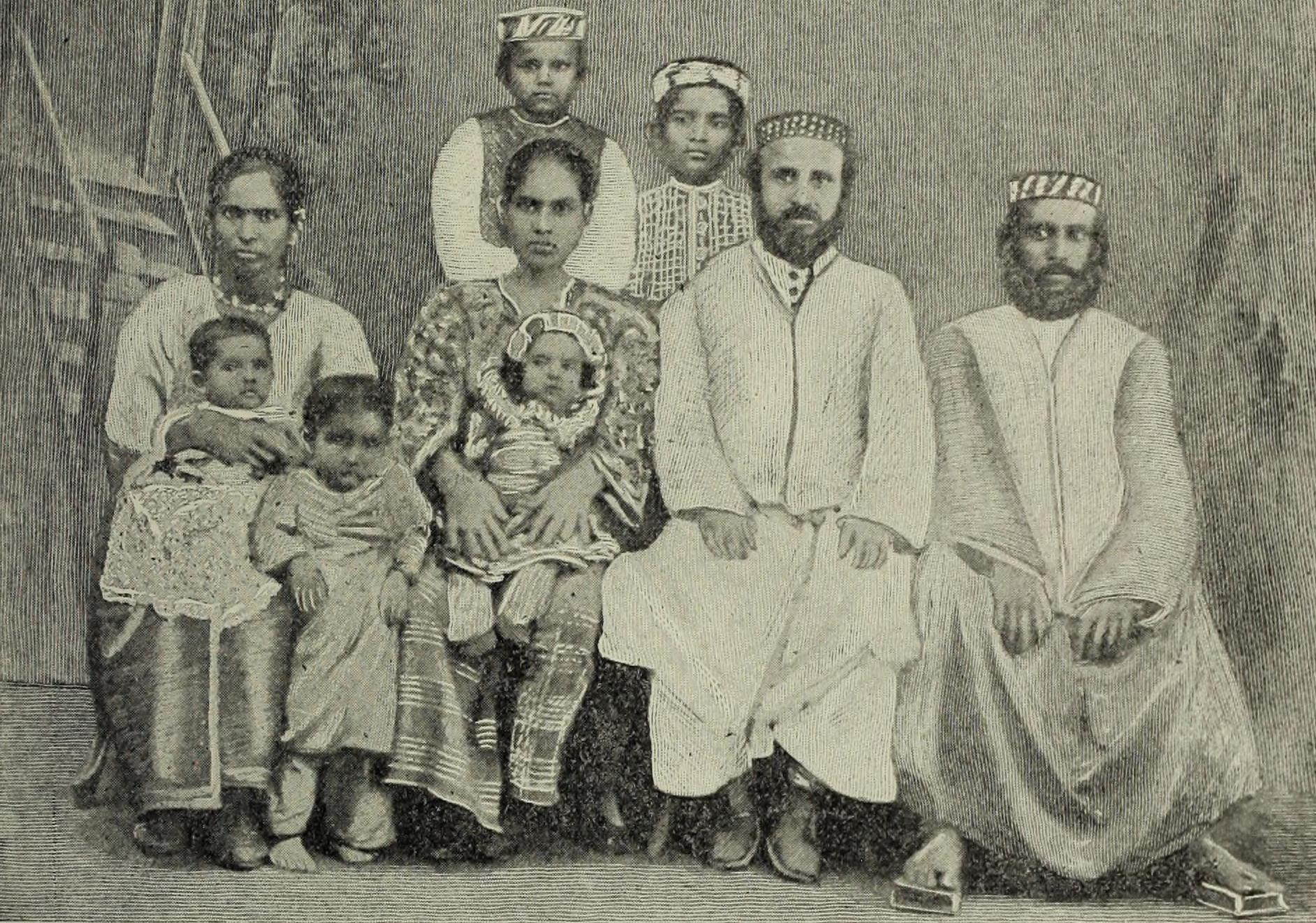
An Indian Jewish family in Cochin, circa 1900.

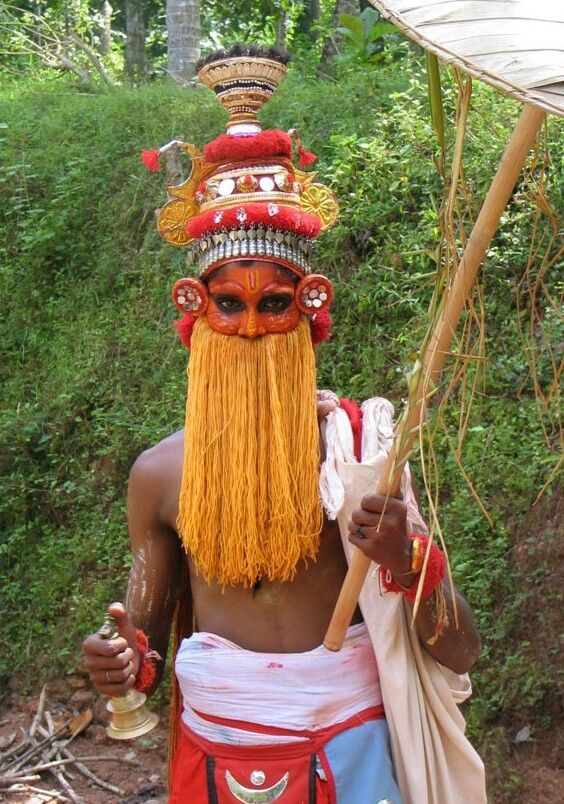
'Onapottan' – a folk character seen during Onam season specially in North Malabar Region. With the face painted and crown ( Kireedam ) he has a bell in his hand and an umbrella made of Palm Leaves on the other.

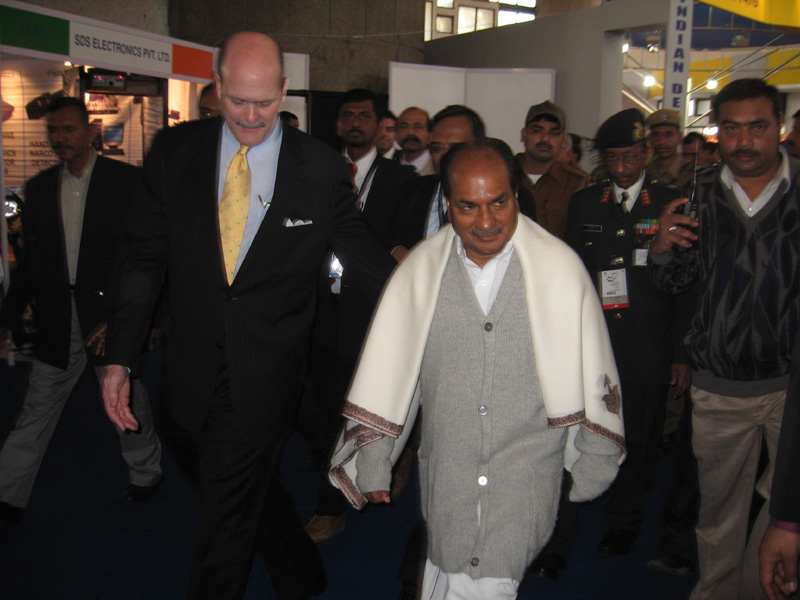
A.K. Antony former Defence Minister of India is an atheist who was born to a Malayali family in the Alappuzha district of Kerala.

Language	No. of speakers	% of population
Malayalam	32,413,213	97.03
Tamil	498,938	1.49
Tulu	124,266	0.37
Kannada	78,067	0.23
Konkani	68,595	0.2
Hindi	45,817	0.13
Telugu	35,355	0.1
Marathi	31,642	0.09
Bengali	29,061	0.087
Urdu	13,122	0.03
Odia	10,958	0.03
Assamese	5,796	0.01
English	4,471	0.01
Gujarati	4,460	0.01
Nepali	3,665	0.01
Bhili	3,458	0.01
Punjabi	1,380	0.004
Sindhi	1,251	0.004
Other languages	32,546	0.097
Total	33,406,061	100%

== Religion and Community ==
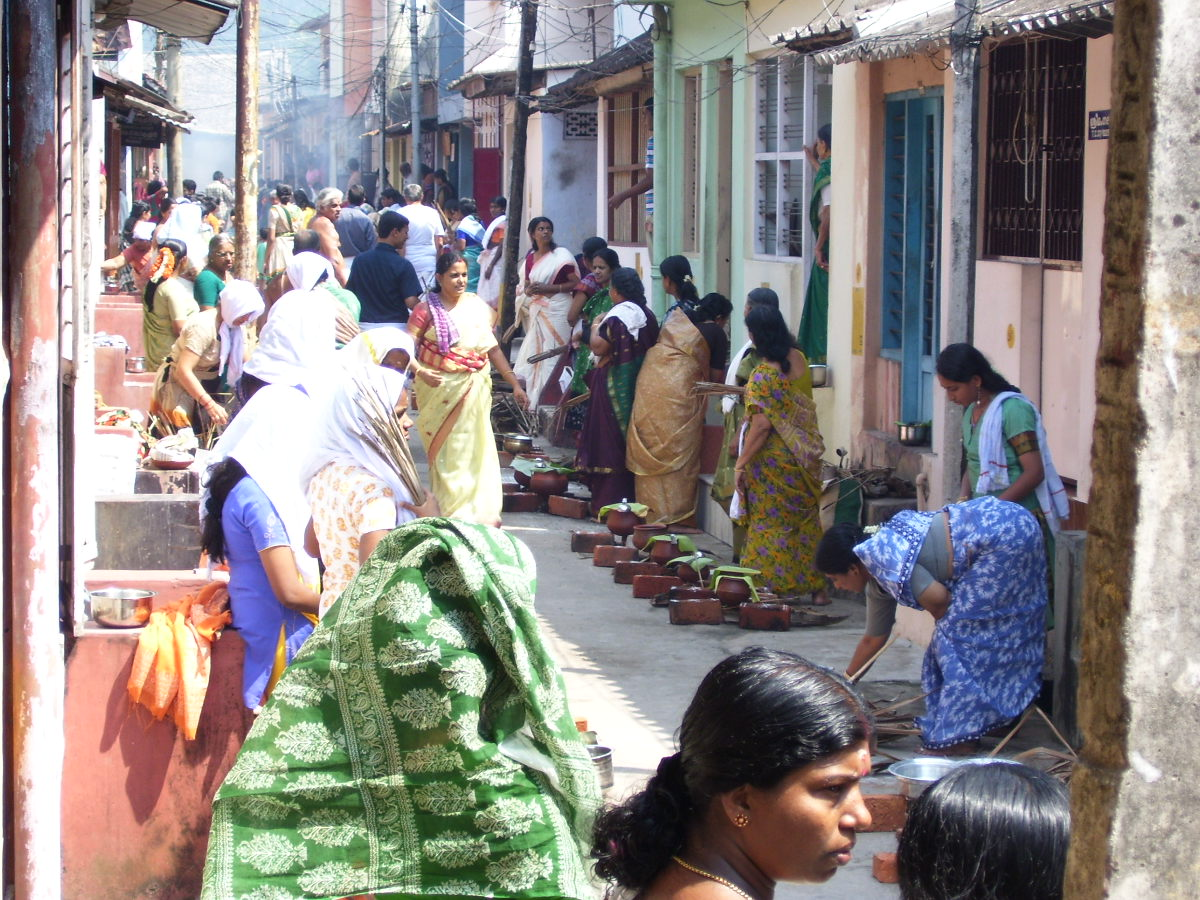
Hindu women worship during Attukal Pongala at Tippu Street, South Fort, Thiruvananthapuram.

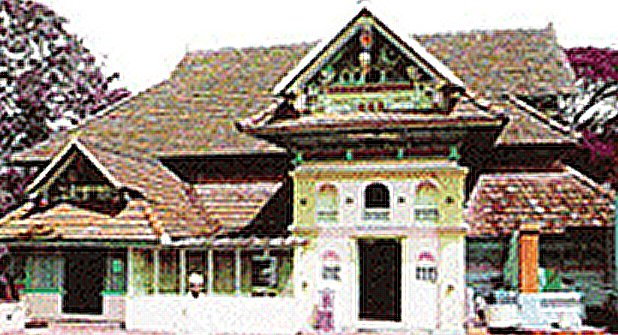
Malik Dinar Mosque, Thazhathangadi, Kasargode, Kerala.

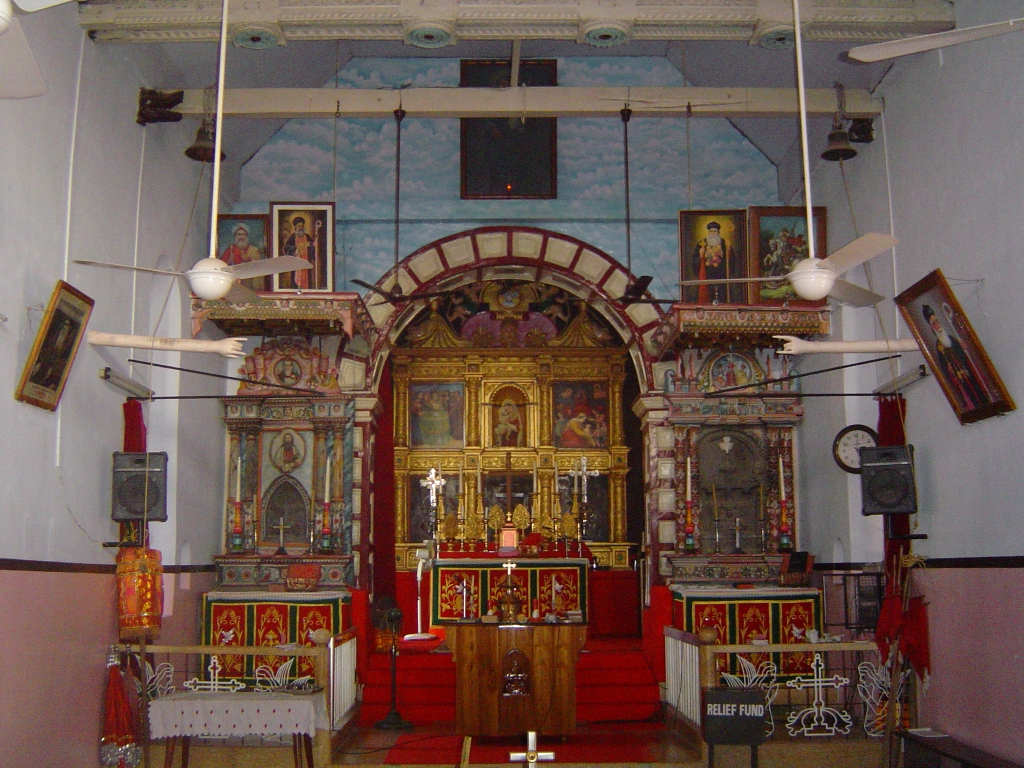
Inside a Knanaya Church in Thazhathangadi, Kottayam

According to the 2001 census the breakdown of ethnic groups by religion is:

	Malayalam	Other languages	Total
Hindu	54.20%	2%	56.20%
Muslim	23.70%	1%	24.70%
Christian	18.00%	1%	19.00%
Other religions	<0.1%	<0.1%	00.10%
Total	96.00%	4.00%	100.00%

== 1968 Socio-Economic Survey of Kerala ==
In 1968, the Communist government under E. M. S. Namboodiripad ordered a socio-economic survey of each resident in the state of Kerala, to assess caste inequalities. Until the census of 2011, this survey was the only caste-based count conducted in post-independence India. The survey was not very conclusive, since it merged several unrelated castes into one group (for example, Ambalavasis and Tamil Brahmins were grouped along with Malayali Brahmins).

The survey found that individuals belonging to higher castes possessed more land and had relatively higher per capita income as compared to the general population. The survey found that 33% of the states population was forward caste, almost half of whom were Syrian Christians. According to the survey, 13% of the Brahmins, 6.8% of the Syro-Malabar Catholics, 5.4% of the Jacobites and 4.7% of the Nairs owned more than 5 acres of land. This compared with 1.4% of the Ezhavas, 1.9% of the Muslims and 0.1% of the Scheduled Castes who had that much land in their possession.

Population of Kerala, per the 1968 Socio-Economic Survey
Caste	Population	Percentage
Arayan / Mukkuvan	851,603	4.24%
Brahmin	353,329	1.76%
Chetty/ Vellalar	151,150	0.75%
Christian Scheduled Caste	301,912	1.50%
Ezhava/ Thiyya	4,457,808	22.19
Ezhuthachan	260,042	1.29%
Kammalar	756,178	3.76%
Jacobite & Marthomite	731,207	3.64%
Muslim	3,842,322	19.12%
Nair	2,905,775	14.46%
Nair Other	435,396	2.17%
Scheduled Castes	1,578,115	7.85%
Scheduled Tribe	253,519	1.26%
Syro Malabar Catholics	2,808,640	14.00%
Latin Rite Catholics (LC)	405,638	2.00%
Total	20,092,634	100.00%

The last comprehensive caste census of Kerala was undertaken by the British in 1931 (the Census of 1941 also asked caste, but the tables were never published).

Caste	Population (1931)	Percentage (1931)
Malayali Brahmin	50,240	0.51%
Brahmin	121,748	1.24%
Ambalavasi Brahmin	39,371	0.40%
Samanta Kshatriya	5,901	0.06%
Samanthan Nair	4,921	0.05%
Nair	1,505,929	15.30%
Vilakkithala Nair	35,199	0.36%
Veluthedath Nair	22,219	0.23%
Kammalar	265,752	2.70%
Vellalar	88,584	0.90%
Chetty	49,213	0.50%
Izhava + Thiyya	2,007,901	20.40%
Kaniyar	39,371	0.40%
Mukkuvar + Arayar	88,584	0.90%
Parayar	165,656	1.68%
Pulayar + Cherumar	678,387	6.89%
Kuravan	95,295	0.97%
Thandan	41,214	0.42%
Nadar	402,555	4.09%
Christians	2,005,239	18.37%
Muslim	1,604,629	16.30%
Total	9,842,650	

== See also ==
- Religion in Kerala
- Caste system in Kerala
- Migrant labourers in Kerala

== Notes ==
- Chandran, VP (2018). Mathrubhumi Yearbook Plus - 2019 (Malayalam ed.). Kozhikode: P. V. Chandran, Managing Editor, Mathrubhumi Printing & Publishing Company Limited, Kozhikode.
