= Registrar General and Census Commissioner of India =

Census official of India

- Demographics of India
- Abbreviation: RGCCI
- Formation: 1961; 65 years ago
- Type: Official Census organisation
- Headquarters: 2/A, Man Singh Road New Delhi, Delhi – 110011
- Region served: India
- Registrar General & Census Commissioner: Mritunjay Kumar Narayan, IAS
- Parent organisation: Ministry of Home Affairs, Government of India
- Website: Official Website

India population density.

Registrar General and Census Commissioner of India, founded in 1961 by the Government of India Ministry of Home Affairs, for arranging, conducting and analysing the results of the demographic surveys of India including Census of India and Linguistic Survey of India. The position of Registrar General and Census Commissioner is now held by a civil servant holding the rank of Additional Secretary.

== History ==
The Indian Census is the largest single source of a variety of statistical information on different characteristics of the people of India.

The first census of India was conducted in the 1872 and attempted to collect data across as much of the country as was feasible. The first of the decennial censuses took place in 1881. Until 1961, responsibility for arranging, conducting and analysing the results of the census was exercised by a temporary administrative structure that was put in place for each census and then dismantled. From that time on, the office of the Registrar General and Census Commissioner of India has existed as a permanent department of central government; each state and union territory has a supervisory Directorate of Census Operations.

== British Raj period ==
Attempts to enumerate population in parts of the Indian subcontinent and, more important, to assess landholdings for revenue purposes, existed before the British Raj and are attested in writings such as those of Abu'l-Fazl ibn Mubarak and Muhnot Nainsi. The British East India Company, too, carried out quantitative exercises in various places and at various times. By 1871–72, when the Raj authorities conducted the first all-India census, the only administrative area of British India that had not already attempted to conduct a region-wide enumeration was Bengal Province. (Note: William Wilson Hunter had commenced work on what became the Statistical Account of Bengal around 1869 but it was not completed until a few years after the first all-India census; Francis Buchanan-Hamilton had conducted a limited survey of the region in the early 1800s.)

The conduct of censuses in India by the British Raj administration significantly influenced the culture of the country. Peter Gottschalk says that:

... classifications of convenience for government officials transformed into contested identities for the Indian public as the census went from an enumerative exercise of the British government to an authoritative representation of the social body and a vital tool of indigenous interests. All of this pivoted on the fact that statistical comparison in British India relied upon a purportedly scientific classificatory system dissimilar to Indic antecedents yet similar to that of medieval Europe: focused on mutually exclusive, essence-defined, religious categories.

=== 1891 ===
Jervoise Athelstane Baines was in charge of the 1891 census. He adjusted the classification system.

=== 1901 ===
The Census Commissioner for 1901 was H. H. Risley. He was appointed in 1899 and was influenced by Baines. The detailed regulations that he formulated for the exercise were also used for the 1911 census, and the work involved in co-ordinating the various provincial administrations was considerable and detailed.

=== 1911 ===
E. A. Gait was in overall charge of the 1911 census.

=== 1931 ===
In 1929, J. H. Hutton was given the office of Commissioner for the 1931 census. Aside from performing his official duties in the compilation of the subsequent report, he used the experience when writing his personal work, Caste in India, that was published in 1946. The first ever caste based census in India was done in 1931. He encouraged administrators of the Indian Civil Service to write about the various communities with which they were familiar and Christoph von Fürer-Haimendorf says that "... some of the arguments and cultural parallels contained in Part 1 [of the 1931 census report] advanced novel theories perhaps more appropriate to a learned journal that to the pages of an official census report."

=== 1941 ===
W. W. M. Yeatts was appointed Census Commissioner for the 1941 census, which proved to be the last of the British Raj era. He made almost no changes to the questions that had been asked of respondents previously but was persuaded to introduce a system whereby each person received their own form for completion. Prior to this, the questionnaires had been, according to Asok Mitra, "... a continuous household form for recording characteristics of successive households in a defined locality, which had proved ideal for cross-checking for internal consistency of demographic attributes of each member of a household as well as for manual coding and tabulation". The new individualised method was intended to assist in analysis using Hollerith machines. The proposal was to conduct a full enumeration of basic data, such as headcount, age and gender, and to conduct a more detailed sampled enumeration of socio-economic and cultural characteristics. It was thought that this approach would save time and money, as well as reduce the extent of problems caused by errors, undercounts and inconsistencies.

The census was not a success. It was hampered by the fact that World War II was ongoing and by India's literacy and education standards. Those standards made it unfeasible to permit self-enumeration by the respondents but the costs and time involved in training enumerators to act on their behalf had not been offset against the perceived benefits of adopting the sampling method. Very little data was produced other than figures for total population and, says Mitra, "The tabulations of the [sampled] results on machines were so botched and delayed that even by 1954, no complete tabulations ... had been made. The final results defied coherent interpretation at the state or national level."

== Post-independence ==
=== 1951 ===
The importance of large quantities of detailed and varied demographic data increased as India moved towards adoption of five-year development plans. Yeatts was appointed as Commissioner for the 1951 Census of India but died in 1948 and was replaced by R. A. Gopalaswami. The new incumbent refused to be swayed, as Yeatts had been, by the arguments of Prasanta Chandra Mahalanobis regarding adoption of sampling methods. Mahalanobis had founded the Indian Statistical Institute but was no match for Gopalaswami, who successfully argued that the diversity of the Indian populace — such as its multilinguality and multiethnicity — was so extreme that no sample would have any statistical utility for planning purposes. The use of individual enumeration slips, combined with household schedules, was retained but the slips were simplified as much as possible in order to maximise the accuracy of information derived from a population that had limited capabilities.

=== 1961 ===
In discussions concerning the census of 1961, Mahalanobis tried once more to cause the adoption of a sampling system. Ashok Mitra had been appointed Commissioner for this census and he, too, was able to counter the idea after demonstrating how cross-checks of the data were performed.

== See also ==
- Scientific racism
- 2011 Census of India
