= Bibliography of India =

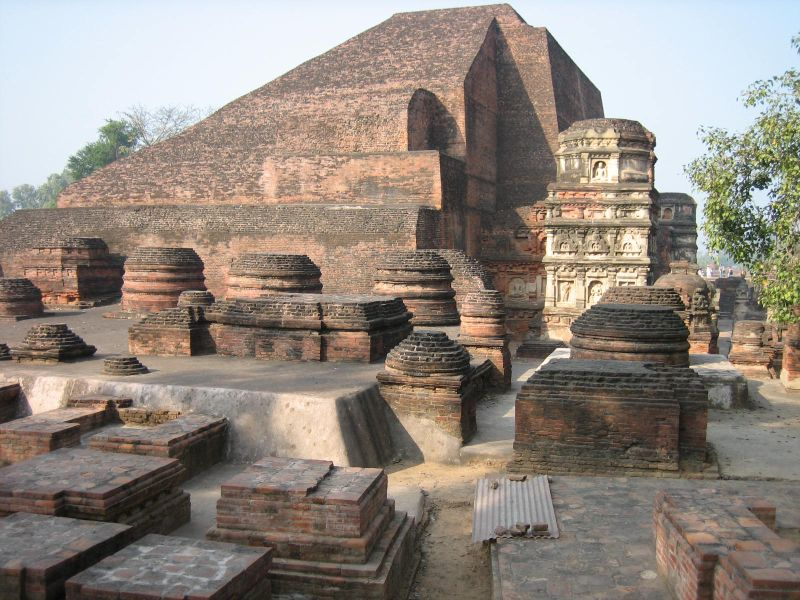
The ruins of Nalanda university, which had well-equipped libraries. The number of volumes in the Nalanda library is not known, but it is estimated to have been in the hundreds of thousands.

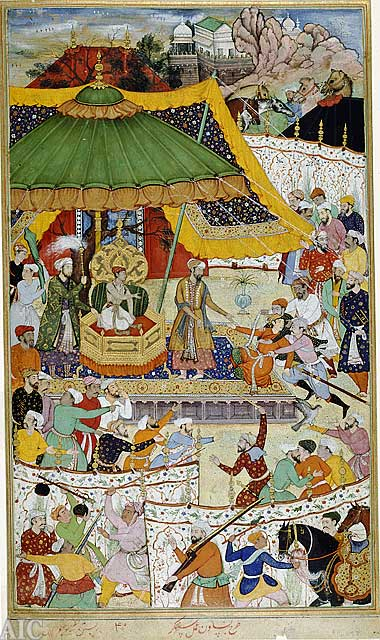
The court of Akbar, an illustration from a manuscript of the Akbarnama, 16th century

This is a bibliography of notable works about the historical Indian subcontinent as well as the modern-day Republic of India.

== India history books ==
=== Single volume works ===
==== Primary sources ====
Ancient India

- Diodorus Siculus, 1st century BC. "Book II: The East." Pp. 35–60 in Bibliotheca historica.
- Ashokavadana, 2nd century CE

Medieval India

- ibn Mubarak, Abu'l-Fazl. 16th century. Ain-i-Akbari, Akbarnama Vol. 3. Full online set.
- Jahangir, Nur-ud-din Muhammad. 16th century. Tuzk-e-Jahangiri.
- Kashmiri, Muhammad Ali. 1642. Tohfatu'l-ahbab.
- Qazvini, Muhammad Amin. 1646. Padshah Nama.

British Raj

- Nehru, Jawaharlal. 1946. The Discovery of India.
- Hunter, William Wilson (1893). A Brief History of the Indian Peoples. Oxford: Clarendon Press.
- Hudson, Roger, ed. (1999). The Raj: an eye-witness history of the British in India. London: Folio Society.
- Mill, James. 1817, 1820, 1826. The History of British India, edited by Horace Hayman Wilson (1848, 1858).

==== Secondary sources ====
- Mookerji, Radhakumud (1912). Indian Shipping: A history of the sea-borne trade and maritime activity of the Indians from the earliest times. Longmans, Green and Co., Bombay.
- F. E. Pargiter (1922). Ancient Indian Historical Tradition. Oxford University Press, H. Milford.
- Bannerjee, Dr. Gauranganath (1921). India as Known to the Ancient World. Humphrey Milford, Oxford University Press, London.
- Balagangadhara, S. N. 2012. Reconceptualizing India Studies. New Delhi: Oxford University Press.
- Bryant, Edwin. 2001. The Quest for the Origins of Vedic Culture. Oxford University Press
- Chakrabarti, Dilip K. 1997. Colonial Indology. New Delhi: Munshiram Manoharlal.
- Durant, W. 2011. The Case for India. Mumbai: Strand Book Stall.
- Inden, R. B. 2010. Imagining India. Bloomington, IN: Indiana University Press.
- Karkare, Neelesh Ishwarchandra. 2014. Shreenath Madhavji: Mahayoddha Mahadji Ki Shourya Gatha.
- Lal, B. B. 1997. The earliest civilization of South Asia: Rise, maturity, and decline. New Delhi: Aryan Books International.
- —— 1998. India 1947-1997: New light on the Indus civilization. New Delhi: Aryan Books International.
- Lal, K. S. 1980. History of the Khaljis: A.D. 1290-1320. New Delhi: Munshiram Manoharlal.
- Adluri, Vishwa, and Joydeep Bagchee. 2014. The Nay Science: A History of German Indology. New York: Oxford University Press. ISBN 978-0199931361
- Richards, John F. (1995). The Mughal Empire.
- Guha, Ramachandra. 2007. India after Gandhi.
- Dharampal. [1983] 1995. The beautiful tree: Indigenous Indian education in the eighteenth century. New Delhi: Biblia Impex Private Limited.
- —— 2000. Indian science and technology in the eighteenth century: Some contemporary European accounts. Goa: Other India Press.
- Panikkar, K. M. 1965. Asia and Western dominance. Millswood, AU: Braille Writing Association of South Australia.
- Priolkar, A. K. 1961. "The Goa Inquisition: Being a Quatercentenary Commemoration Study of the Inquisition in India." Bombay University.
- Majumdar, Ramesh C. 1962. History of the Freedom Movement in India, 3 vols. Calcutta: K. L. Mukhopadhyay. ISBN 81-7102-099-2.
- —— 1970. Historiography in Modern India. London: Asia Publishing House.
- Majumdar, Ramesh C., Hem C. Raychaudhuri, and Kalikinkar Datta. [1946] 2007. An Advanced History of India. Delhi: Macmillan India.
- Trautmann, Thomas. 1997. Aryans and British India. Berkeley: University of California Press.
- Sen, Amartya. 2005. The Argumentative Indian. Farrar, Straus and Giroux.
- V. S. Bhatnagar (1991). "Foreword". Kānhaḍade Prabandha, India's Greatest Patriotic Saga of Medieval Times: Padmanābha's Epic Account of Kānhaḍade. Aditya Prakashan. ISBN 978-81-85179-54-4.
- Elphinstone, Mountstuart. 1841. The History of India, 2 vols. London: John Murray. vol. 1, vol. 2.
- Sachau, Eduard C. 1910. Alberuni's India — An account of ... India about A.D. 1030, 2 vols. London: Kegan Paul, Trench Trubner & Co.Ltd. vol. 1, vol. 2.
- Major, Richard Henry, ed. (1857). India in the Fifteenth Century: Being a collection of narratives of voyages to India, in the century . London: Hakluyt Society.
- Elliot, Henry M. 1867–1877. The History of India, as Told by Its Own Historians. The Muhammadan Period, 8 vols., edited by J. Dowson.
- Lethbridge, Roper, Sir (1893). The History of India. London: Macmillan.
- Feudge, Fannie Roper (1903). India; The Gorgeous East with Richest Hand Showers on her Kings Barbaric Pearl and Gold. The Saalfield Publishing Company, Ohio.
- De La Fosse, C. F. (1918). History of India (Revised ed.). London: Macmillan & Co.
- Kulke, Hermann; Rothermund, Dietmar (1991). A History of India. Routledge. ISBN 9781138961159.

=== Multivolume works ===
- Firishta, Muhammad. 1794. Ferishta's History of Dekkan..., 2 vols., translated by J. Scott, Jonathan. London: John Stockdale. vol. 1, vol. 2.
- Tod, James. 1829, 1832. Annals and Antiquities of Rajasthan, 2 vols. London: Smith, Elder.
- Dutt, Romesh Chunder (1906). Williams Jackson, A. V. (ed.). History of India: From the Earliest times to the Sixth century B.C . Vol. 1. London: Grolier Society.
- Chattopadhyaya, Debbi P., ed. 2009. Project of History of Indian Science, Philosophy and culture, 20 vols. Centre for Studies in Civilizations.
- Dodwell, H. H. (1929). The Cambridge History of India: British India, 1497-1858 (Vol. 5). Cambridge University Press.
- —— (1932). The Cambridge History of India: The Indian Empire, 1858-1918 (Vol. 6). Cambridge University Press.
- Haig, Wolseley, Sir (1928). The Cambridge History of India: Turks and Afghans (Vol. 3). Cambridge University Press.
- Jackson, A. V. Williams, ed. 1906–1907. History of India, 10 vols. London: Grolier Society.
  - Smith, Vincent Arthur. 1906. History of India, vol. 2: From Sixth century B.C to Mohammedan Conquest.
  - Lane-Poole, Stanley. 1906. History of India, vol. 3: From Mohammedan Conquest to the Reign of Akbar the Great.
  - —— 1906. History of India, vol. 4: From Reign of Akbar the Great to the Fall of Moghul Empire.
  - Elliot, Henry M. 1907. History of India, vol. 5: The Muhammadan Period as Described by Its Own Historians.
  - Hunter, William Wilson. 1906. History of India, vol. 6: From the first European settlements to the founding of the English East India Company.
  - —— 1906. History of India, vol. 7: The European struggle for Indian supremacy in the seventeenth century.
  - Lyall, A. C. 1907. History of India, vol. 8: From the close of the seventeenth century to the present time.
  - Jackson, A. V. Williams. 1907. History of India, vol. 9: Historic accounts of India by foreign travellers, classic, oriental, and occidental.
- Majumdar, Ramesh C. 1951–1969. The History and Culture of the Indian People, 11 vols. Mumbai: Bharatiya Vidya Bhavan.
- Malhotra, Rajiv. 2012. Infinity Foundation series: Contributions to history of Indian science and technology, 20 vols. New Delhi: Pentagon Press.
- Rapson, Edward James (1922). The Cambridge History of India: Ancient India (Vol. 1). Cambridge University Press.

== Race, caste and tribe ==
=== Primary sources ===
- Sherring, M. A. 1872–81. Hindoo Tribes and Castes, 3 vols.

==== Northern India ====
- Crooke, William. 1896. The tribes and castes of the North-western Provinces and Oudh, 4 vols. Calcutta: Office of the Superintendent of Government Printing.
  - Volume I
  - Volume II
  - Volume III
  - Volume IV
- Rose, Horace Arthur, and Edward Douglas MacLagan. 1911–1919. A Glossary of the Tribes and Castes of the Punjab and North-West Frontier Province, 3 vols. Lahore: Samuel T. Weston at the Civil and Military Gazette Press.

==== Central Provinces ====
- Enthoven, Reginald Edward. 1920–1922. The Tribes and Castes of Bombay, 3 vols. Bombay: Government Central Press.
- Russell, Robert Vane. 1916. Tribes and Castes of the Central Provinces of India, 4 vols. Rai Bahadur Hira Lal. London: Macmillan & Co.
  - Volume I
  - Volume II
  - Volume III
  - Volume IV

==== Southern India ====
- Thurston, Edgar, and K. Rangachari. 1909. Castes and Tribes of Southern India, 7 vols. Madras: Government Press.
  - Volume I (A to B)
  - Volume II (C to J)
  - Volume III (K)
  - Volume IV (K to M)
  - Volume V (M to P)
  - Volume VI (P to S)
  - Volume VII (T to Z)

=== Secondary sources ===
- Bayly, Susan (2001). Caste, Society and Politics in India from the Eighteenth Century to the Modern Age. Cambridge University Press. ISBN 978-0-521-79842-6.
- Dhar, Triloki Nath (2006). Kashmiri Pandit Community: A Profile. Mittal Publications. ISBN 978-81-8324-177-9.
- Jeffrey, Robin (1994) [1976]. The Decline of Nair Dominance: Society and Politics in Travancore 1847-1908. Sussex University Press. ISBN 0-85621-054-4.
- Malhotra, Rajiv. 2011. Breaking India: Western Interventions in Dravidian and Dalit Faultlines. Amaryllis. ISBN 978-8-191-06737-8.

== Biography ==
- Basu, Kanailal. 2010. Netaji: Rediscovered.
- Borthwick, Meredith. 1977. Keshub Chunder Sen: a search for cultural synthesis.
- Chakrabarty, D. 2016. The Calling of History: Sir Jadunath Sarkar and His Empire of Truth.
- Collet, Sophia Dobson, and Francis Herbert Stead. 1914. The Life and Letters of Raja Rammohun Roy, edited by Hem Chandra Sarkar.
- Fauja, S., and Gurbachan Singh Talib. 1996. Guru Tegh Bahadur: Martyr and Teacher. Patiala: Punjabi University.
- Geddes, Patrick. 1920. The Life and Work of Sir Jagadis C. Bose.
- Gordon, Leonard A. 1990. Brothers Against the Raj: A Biography of Indian Nationalist Leaders Sarat and Subhas Chandra Bose.
- Hatcher, Brian A. 2014. Vidyasagar: The Life and After-life of an Eminent Indian.
- Hunter, William Wilson. 1889. Rulers of India series, 28 vols.
- Kanigel, Robert. 1991. The Man Who Knew Infinity.
- Karkare, Neelesh Ishwarchandra. Biography on Great Warrior Shreenath Mahadji Shinde.
- Kaviraj, Krishnadas. 1582. Chaitanya Charitamrita.
  - translated in Sarkar, Jadunath, trans. 1922. Chaitanya's Life and Teachings.
- Kling, Blair B. 1976. Partner in Empire: Dwarkanath Tagore and the Age of Enterprise in Eastern India.
- Lal, B. B. 2011. Piecing together: Memoirs of an archaeologist. New Delhi: Aryan Books International.
- Majumdar, R. C. 1967. Svami Vivekananda: A Historical Review. Calcutta: General Printers & Publishers.
- Max Müller, Friedrich. 1916. Ramakrishna: His Life and Sayings.
- Mitra, Subal Chandra. 1902. Isvar Chandra Vidyasagar, a story of his life and work.
- Nasrin, Taslima. 1999. Amar Meyebela - My Girlhood. Calcutta: People's Book House.
- Paul, Samiran Kumar, and Amar Nath Prasad. 2006. Recritiquing Rabindranath Tagore.
- Radhakrishnan, Sarvepalli. 1919. The Philosophy of Rabindranath Tagore.
- Rao, S. R. 2008. Reminiscences of an archaeologist. New Delhi: Aryan Books International.
- Rhys, Ernest P. 1916. Rabindranath Tagore: A Biographical Study.
- Robinson, W. Andrew. 1989. Satyajit Ray: The Inner Eye: The Biography of a Master Film-Maker. vol 1, vol. 2.
- Rolland, Romain. The Life of Ramakrishna.
- —— The Life of Vivekananada and the Universal Gospel.
- Roy, Basanta Koomar. 1915. Rabindranath Tagore – The man and his poetry. (1915: 1; 1916: 2)
- Roy, Samaren. 1986. The Twice-born Heretic, M. N. Roy and Comintern.
- —— 1988. India's First Communist.
- —— 1997. M. N. Roy: A Political Biography.
- Sarkar, Jadunath. 1981. History of Aurangzib. Orient Longman.
- —— 2012. Shivaji and His Times. Orient Longman.
- Sister Nivedita. 1910. The Master as I Saw Him
- Seely, Clinton B. 1990. A Poet Apart: A literary biography of the Bengali poet Jibanananda Das, (1899-1954).
- Sen, Amiya Prosad. 2008. Bankim Chandra Chattopadhyay: An Intellectual Biography.
- Sengupta, Subodh Chandra. 1977. Bankimchandra Chatterjee.
- Toye, Hugh. 1959. The Springing Tiger.
- Yogananda, Paramahansa. 1946. Autobiography of a Yogi.
- The father of modern India: Commemoration volume of the Rammohun Roy centenary celebration, 1933. Rammohun Roy Centenary Committee. 1935.

=== Biographical dictionaries and encyclopedias ===
- Samsad Bangali Charitabhidhan, ed. Subodh Chandra Sengupta
- Dictionary of National Biography 4 vols ed. Sibapada Sen
- The Indian Biographical Dictionary (1915) by C. Hayavadana Rao
- Dictionary of Indian biography (1906) by Charles Edward Buckland
- Who's Who in India Supplement 1 (1912)
- Who's Who in India Supplement 2 (1914)
- The Golden Book of India, a genealogical and biographical dictionary of the ruling princes, chiefs, nobles, and other personages, titled or decorated, of the Indian empire (1893) by Roper Lethbridge
- The Oriental Biographical Dictionary (1881) by Thomas William Beale
- Reminiscences and Anecdotes of Great Men of India by Ram Gopal Sanyal Vol 1 (1894), Vol 2 (1895)
- Who's who of Indian Writers, 1999: A-M
- Encyclopaedia of Indian Literature, Volume 1
- Encyclopaedia of Indian Literature, Volume 2
- Encyclopaedia of Indian Literature, Volume 3
- Encyclopaedia of Indian Literature, Volume 5
- Encyclopaedia of Indian Literature: Supplementary entries and index
- Historical Dictionary of the Bengalis (2013) by Kunal Chakrabarti, Shubhra Chakrabarti

== Manuals and gazetteers ==
- Chaudhuri, S. B. 1964. History of the Gazetteers of India. New Delhi: Publication Division.
- Henry Scholberg (1970). The District Gazetteers of British India: A Bibliography. Zug, Switzerland: Inter Documentation Company. ISBN 9780800212650.
- Tej Ram Sharma (1978). Personal and geographical names in the Gupta inscriptions. Concept Publishing Co., Delhi.
- The Imperial Gazetteer of India

== Travelogues ==
=== Early period ===
- Indica by Megasthenes, c. 300 BCE
- Fa, Hien (1877). "Record of the Buddhistic Kingdoms" by Fa Hien (414 AD). Herbert A. Giles (trans.). London: Trubner & Co., 414 CE
- Mundy, Peter (31 January 2024). The Travels of Peter Mundy in Europe and Asia, 1608-1667. Cambridge [Eng] Printed for the Hakluyt Society. ISBN 978-0-8115-0338-9.
- Faxian; tr. by James Legge (1886). A Record of Buddhistic kingdoms; being an account by the Chinese monk FA-HIEN of his travels in India and Ceylon, A.D. 399-414, in search of the Buddhist books of discipline. Oxford: Clarendon Press.
- Great Tang Records on the Western Regions, by Xuanzang. 646 CE.
- Watters, Thomas (1904). On Yuan Chwang's Travels in India, 629-645 A.D. London: Royal Asiatic Society.
- Sachau, Edward C. (1910). Alberuni's India — An account of ... India about A.D. 1030 (Vol. 1). London: Kegan Paul, Trench Trübner & Co.Ltd.
- Sachau, Edward C. (1910). Alberuni's India — An account of ... India about A.D. 1030 (Vol 2.). London: Kegan Paul, Trench Trübner & Co. Ltd.
- Majumdar, R. C. (1981). The Classical accounts of India: Being a compilation of the English translations of the accounts left by Herodotus, Megasthenes, Arrian, Strabo, Quintus, Diodorus, Siculus, Justin, Plutarch, Frontinus, Nearchus, Apollonius, Pliny, Ptolemy, Aelian, and others with maps. Calcutta: Firma KLM.

=== Early modern period ===
- Tavernier, Jean Baptiste; Ball, Valentine (tr. from the Orig French Ed. 1676) (1899). Travels in India (Vol. 1). London: Macmillan & Co.
- Tavernier, Jean Baptiste; Ball, Valentine (tr. from the Orig French Ed. 1676) (1899). Travels in India (Vol. 2). London: Macmillan & Co.
- Herbert, William; William Nichelson; Samuel Dunn (1791). A New Directory for the East-Indies. London: Gilbert & Wright.
- Fraser, James Baillie (1820). Journal of a Tour through Part of the snowy range of the Himala Mountains, and to the sources of the rivers Jumna and Ganges. London: Rodwell and Martin.
- Bernier, Francois (1891). Travels in the Mogul Empire, A.D. 1656-1668. London: Archibald Constable.
- Meenakshi Jain, The India They Saw (co-edited with Sandhya Jain, 4 Volumes, Prabhat Prakashan), ISBN 8184301065, ISBN 8184301073, ISBN 8184301081, ISBN 818430109X.

=== Late modern ===
- Emily Eden. Up the Country
- Karageorgevitch, Prince Bojidar (1899). Enchanted India. New York: Harper & Brothers.
- Begums Thugs and White Mughals. Fanny Parkes, ed. William Dalrymple. 2002
- The Hill of Devi. E. M. Forster, 1953.
- A Walk Along the Ganges. Dennison Berwick. 1985.
- India: A Million Mutinies Now. V. S. Naipaul. 1990.

== Provinces ==
- Holland, Thomas Henry, ed. Provincial Geographies of India.

== Biodiversity and environment ==
- Karan, P. P. "Environmental movements in India." Geographical Review 84#1 (1994): 32-41. online
- Nayak, Arun Kumar. "Environmental movements in India." Journal of developing societies 31.2 (2015): 249-280. online
- Saravanan, Velayutham. Environmental History of Modern India: Land, Population, Technology and Development (Bloomsbury Publishing India, 2022) online review; also see excerpt at Amazon]
- Shiva, Vandana. "Ecology Movements in India", in Oomen, T. K. (Ed.), Social Movements: Issues of Identity (Oxford University Press, New Delhi, 2011)
- Turaga, Rama Mohana R., and Anish Sugathan. "Environmental regulations in India." in Oxford Research Encyclopedia of Environmental Science (2020) online

=== Flora ===
- Nicol Alexander Dalzell; Alexander Gibson (1861). The Bombay Flora: Or, Short Descriptions of All the Indigenous Plants Hitherto Discovered in Or Near the Bombay Presidency : Together with a Supplement of Introduced and Naturalised Species. Education Society's Press.

=== Fauna ===
- Lepidoptera Indica
- The Fauna of British India, Including Ceylon and Burma
- Fletcher, Thomas B., and Charles M. Inglis. 1924. Birds of an Indian Garden. Calcutta & Simla: Thacker, Spink & Co.
- Marshall, George F. L. and Lionel de Nicéville. Butterflies of India, Burmah and Ceylon.

== Princely states ==
- Hope, John (1863). The House of Scindia — A Sketch by John Hope. Longman, Green, Longman, Roberts & Green, London.
- Menon, P. Shungoonny (1879). A History of Travancore from the Earliest Times. Higginbotham & Co., Madras.
- Prinsep, A.R.A., Val C. (1879). Imperial India — An artist's journals:Illustrated by numerous sketches taken at the courts of the principal chiefs in India. Chapman and Hall, London.
- Ramusack, Barbara N. (2004). The Indian Princes and Their States.
- Supplement to Who's Who in India — Containing lives and photographs of the recipients of honours on 12th December 1911. Newul Kishore Press, Lucknow. 1912.

== People, politics and customs ==
- Bayly, Susan (2001). Caste, Society and Politics in India from the Eighteenth Century to the Modern Age. Cambridge University Press. ISBN 978-0-521-79842-6.
- Broughton, Thomas Duer (1812). Letters written in a Mahratta camp during the year 1809, descriptive of the character, manners, domestic habits, and religious ceremonies, of the Mahrattas. Archibald Constable & Co., London.
- Buyers, Rev. William (1848). Recollections of Northern India — With observations on the origin, customs, and moral sentiments of the Hindoos, and remarks on the country and principal places on the Ganges. John Snow, Paternoster Row, London.
- Karaka, Dosabhai Framjee (1884). History of the Parsis — Including their manners, customs, religion and present position. (Vol. 1). Macmillan & Co., London.
- Karaka, Dosabhai Framjee (1884). History of the Parsis — Including their manners, customs, religion and present position. (Vol. 2). Macmillan & Co., London.
- Kishwar, M., & Vanita, R. (1996). In search of answers: Indian women's voices from Manushi : a selection from the first five years of Manushi. Daryaganj, New Delhi: Manohar.
- Dass, Baboo Ishuree (1860). Domestic manners and customs of the Hindoos of northern India, or, more strictly speaking, of the north west provinces of India. Medical Hall Press, Benares.
- J.Forbes Watson (1866). The Textile Manufactures and the Costumes of the People of India. India Office by George Edward Eyre and William Spottiswoode, London.
- Illustrations of the Textile Manufactures of India. Victoria & Albert Museum, London. 1881.
- Menpes, Mortimer (1910). The People of India (Illustrated). Adam & Charles Black, London.
- Manmatha Nath Dutt, ed. (1896). Kamandakiya Nitisara: The Elements of Polity. H.C.Dass, Calcutta.
- Goel, S. R. 1998. Vindicated by Time: The Niyogi Committee Report on Christian Missionary Activities. Madhya Pradesh: Christian Missionary Activities Enquiry Committee.

== Religion, culture and arts ==
- Acharya, Prasanna Kumar (946). An Encyclopaedia of Hindu Architecture. Oxford University Press.
- Blacker, J. F. (1922). The ABC of Indian Art. Stanley Paul & Co., London.
- Coomaraswamy, Ananda Kentish. 1909. The Indian Craftsman. London: Probsthain.
- —— (1914). Viśvakarmā; examples of Indian architecture, sculpture, painting, handicraft. London.
- Ghose, Aurobindo. 1998. The Foundations of Indian Culture. Pondicherry: Sri Aurobindo Ashram.
- Gibson, Agnes C.; Jas. Burgess (1901). Buddhist Art in India. Bernard Quaritch, London.
- Gupta, S. P., and S. Asthana. 2007. Elements of Indian Art: Including Temple Architecture, Iconography & Iconometry. New Delhi: Indraprastha Museum of Art and Archaeology.
- Gupta, S. P., & Shastri Indo-Canadian Institute. 2011. The Roots of Indian Art: A detailed study of the formative period of Indian art and architecture, third and second centuries B.C., Mauryan and late Mauryan. Delhi: B.R. Publishing Corporation.
- Havell, E. B. (1908). Indian sculpture and painting. John Murray, London.
- —— (1913). Indian Architecture, its psychology, structure, and history from the first Muhammadan invasion to the present day. London: John Murray.
- —— (1920). A Handbook of Indian Art. London: John Murray.
- Kak, S. 2015. The Wishing Tree: Presence and Promise of India. Delhi: Aditya Prakashan.
- Kishwar, M. (1989). Manushi: Women Bhakta poets. New Delhi: Manushi Trust.
- Lokesh, Chandra, and T. Chandrika. 1997. Cultural Horizons of India. New Delhi: Aditya Prakashan.
- Malhotra, Rajiv. 2011. Being Different: An Indian Challenge to Western Universalism. HarperCollins India. ISBN 978-9-350-29190-0.
- —— 2016. Battle for Sanskrit. Harper Collins India. ISBN 978-93-5177-538-6.
- Robinson, W. Andrew. 1989. Satyajit Ray: The Inner Eye: The Biography of a Master Film-Maker. vol 1, vol. 2.
- Sethna, K. D. (1989). Ancient India in a New Light. New Delhi: Aditya Prakashan.
- Sidhanta, N. K. (1929). The Heroic Age of India: A Comparative Study. Kegan Paul, Trench, Trubner & Company, London.
- Smith, Vincent A. (1930). A History of Fine Art in India and Ceylon. Oxford: Clarendon Press.
- Tagore, Abanindranath (1914). Some Notes on Indian Artistic Anatomy. Indian Society of Oriental Art, Calcutta.
- Report of the Indian Cinematograph Committee 1927-1928. Madras: Superintendent, The Government Press, Madras. 1928.

=== Performance art ===
- Day, Charles Russel (1891). The Music and Musical Instruments of southern India and the Deccan. William Gibb (lllus.). Novello, Ewer & Co., London.
- Dhanamjaya (1912). The Dasarupa or Treatise on Ten Forms of Drama — A Treatise on Hindu Dramaturgy. George C. O. Haas (trans.). New York: Columbia University.
- Popley, Herbert Arthur (1921). The Music of India. Calcutta: Association Press.
- Shourie, Arun. 1979. Hinduism, Essence and Consequence: A Study of the Upanishads, the Gita, and the Brahma-Sutras. Sahibabad, District. Ghaziabad: Vikas.
- Strangways, A. H. Fox (1914). The Music of Hindostan. London: Oxford University Press.

=== Religion, folk tales, and spiritual heritage ===
- Alexander, Donald Mackenzie (1913). Indian myth and legend. Gresham, London.
- Coomaraswamy, Ananda Kentish (1918). The Dance of Siva — fourteen Indian essays. The Sunwise Turn Inc., New York.
- Crooke, William. 1896. An Introduction to the Popular Religion and Folklore of Northern India (revised and illustrated ed.), 2 vols. North-Western Provinces and Oudh: Government press.
  - Volume I
  - Volume II
- Dayananda, S., and C. Bharadwaja. 1932. Light of Truth, or, An English translation of the Satyartha Prakasha: The Well-Known Work of Swami Dayananda Saraswati. Madras: Arya Samaj.
- Elst, K. 2014. Decolonizing the Hindu Mind: Ideological Development of Hindu Revivalism. New Delhi: Rupa.
- Frawley, David. 2014. How I became a Hindu: My Discovery of Vedic Dharma.
- —— 2015. Shiva: The Lord of Yoga. Lotus Press.
- Gautier, Francois. 2008. The Guru of Joy: Sri Sri Ravi Shankar & the Art of Living. Carlsbad, Calif: Hay House.
- Ghosha, Pratapchandra, ed. (1871). Durga Puja — With Notes and Illustrations. Varanasi: The Hindu Patriot Press.
- Klostermaier, K. K. 2007. A Survey of Hinduism. Albany: State University of New York Press.
- Malhotra, Rajiv. 2014. Indra's Net: Defending Hinduism's Philosophical Unity. HarperCollins India. ISBN 978-9-351-36244-9.
- Nandikeśvara (1917). The Mirror of Gesture — Being the Abhinaya Darpana of Nandikeśvara. Ananda Kentish Coomaraswamy; Gopala Kristnayya Duggirala (trans.). Harvard University Press, Cambridge, Mass.
- Narain, H. 1983. Facets of Indian Religio-Philosophic Identity. Delhi u.a: Bharatiya Vidya Prakashan.
- Prabhavananda, Swami. 1962. The Spiritual Heritage of India.
- Radhakrishnan, Sarvepalli. 1953. The Principal Upanishads.
- Shourie, Arun. 2017. Two Saints: Speculations around and about Ramakrishna Paramahamsa and Ramana Maharishi. Harper Collins.
- Shourie, Arun, and S. R. Goel. 2009. Hindu Temples, What Happened to Them.
- Swarup, R., and David Frawley. 2001. The Word as Revelation: Names of Gods. New Delhi: Voice of India.
- Sadhana Naithani (21 May 2006). In Quest of Indian Folktales: Pandit Ram Gharib Chaube and William Crooke. Indiana University Press. ISBN 0-253-11202-8.
- Yogananda, Paramahansa. 1946. Autobiography of a Yogi.
- Sanatana Dharma: an advanced text book of Hindu religion and Ethics. Central Hindu College, Benaras. 1904.

== Fiction ==
- Chatterjee, Bankim Chandra. [1882] 2014. Anandamath, edited by B. K. Roy.
- Farrell, James G. 1973. The Siege of Krishnapur.
- Forster, E. M. 1924. A Passage to India.
- Jhabvala, Ruth Prawer. 1960. The Householder.
- —— 1975. Heat and Dust.
- Kipling, Rudyard. 1894. The Jungle Book.
- —— 1901. Kim.
- Masters, John. 1951. Nightrunners of Bengal.
- Rushdie, Salman. 1981. Midnight's Children.
- Scott, Paul. 1965–75. Raj Quartet.
- Smith, Zadie. 2000. White Teeth.
- Wu Cheng'en. c. 1590s. Journey to the West.

== See also ==
- History of India
- Indian literature
- Indology
- Bibliography of Ganges
- Bibliography of Varanasi
- The Cambridge History of India
- The New Cambridge History of India
