= Denzil Ibbetson =

Administrator in British India and author

Sir Denzil Ibbetson
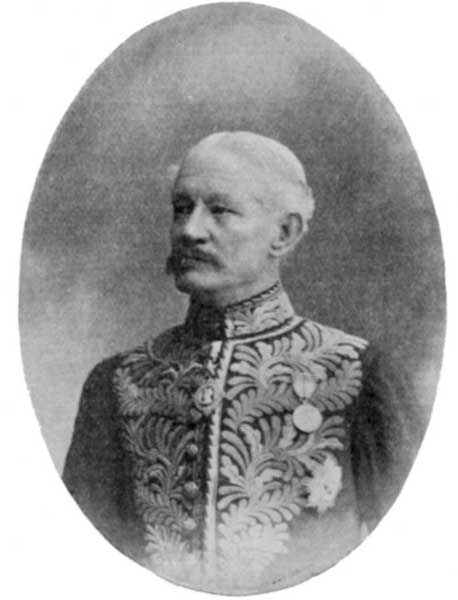
- Born: 30 August 1847; Gainsborough, Lincolnshire, UK
- Died: 21 February 1908 (aged 60); London, UK
- Spouse: Louisa Clarissa Coulden (m. 1870)

Sir Denzil Charles Jelf Ibbetson KCSI (30 August 1847 – 21 February 1908) was an administrator in British India and an author. He served as Deputy Commissioner of Karnal district from 1892 to 1893. He served as Chief-Commissioner of the Central Provinces and Berar from 1898 to 1899 and Lieutenant-Governor of Punjab in 1907.

== Early life ==
Denzil Ibbetson was born in Gainsborough, Lincolnshire on 30 August 1847, the eldest son of Denzil John Holt Ibbetson (1823 – 10 August 1871), who was at that time working as a civil engineer on the Manchester, Sheffield and Lincolnshire Railway. The family moved to Adelaide, Australia after his father took holy orders and became a vicar there, notably of St John's Church, Adelaide in 1861–1871.

Ibbetson was educated at St Peter's College, Adelaide and St John's College, Cambridge. Ibbetson obtained his Bachelor of Arts degree in mathematics in 1869, being ranked as a senior optime. He had come third in the competitive examination for the Indian Civil Service in the previous year.

== Career in India ==
Ibbetson arrived in the Punjab Province of India on 8 December 1870, having married Louisa Clarissa Coulden earlier in that year. Once there, according to the Oxford Dictionary of National Biography, "He formed part of a new élite of ‘competition-wallahs’ which intellectually outshone the earlier generation of Punjabi military political officials and well-connected alumni of Haileybury College."

He held various administrative offices. From 1892 to 1893 he served as Deputy Commissioner of Karnal district of Punjab province, present day Haryana .From 1898 to around 1900 he was Chief-Commissioner of the Central Provinces and Berar, at which time he had to return temporarily to England due to poor health. In September 1901 he was appointed a Member of the Council of the Governor-General of India. He was appointed a Knight Commander of the Order of the Star of India (KCSI) in the 1903 Durbar Honours.

He served temporarily as Lieutenant-Governor of Punjab in 1905 and took over the position permanently in March 1907 when Sir Charles Montgomery Rivaz retired.

Dogged by further ill health that had necessitated another period in England, Ibbetson retired on 21 January 1908 and left India. He died on 21 February at his home at 60 Montague Mansions, York Street, London. He was cremated at Golders Green and survived by his wife.

== Contribution to India census and view on castes ==
The censuses of India carried out in 1865, 1872 and 1881 had attempted to classify people according to the Brahmanic ritual ranking system of varna but this proved not to reflect the realities of social relationships, however much it might have met with approval from scholars of Sanskrit and ancient texts. Furthermore, the Brahmanic system had no practical purpose from an administrative point of view. The latter was of considerable significance as there was a desire to use ethnography and other means in order to develop further the British influence in India. Ibbetson, who was Deputy Superintendent for the 1881 census operation in Punjab, had written in his 1883 Report on the exercise that

Our ignorance of the customs and beliefs of the people among whom we dwell is surely in some respects a reproach to us; for not only does that ignorance deprive European science of material which it greatly needs, but it also involves a distinct loss of administrative power to ourselves".

The 1872 census was, in the opinion of Crispin Bates,

by far the least structured census ever conducted in the subcontinent and a printer's nightmare, since rather than fit the population into pre-determined categories census takers asked relatively open-ended questions about religious beliefs and occupations. The result was a proliferation of columns concerning occupations in particular. Individuals appeared as 'con-man', 'pimp', 'prostitute', 'idiot' and 'thief, or however else they might appear or describe themselves. Worse still, castes and tribes were listed as to whether they were 'animist', Christian, Hindu or Mohammedan, with little structure or system beyond the self-representation of the respondents.

Ibbetson had seen the imperfections of the 1872 census. These informed the decision by the administration in Punjab Province to adopt categorisation by occupation in 1881, regardless of the approach adopted elsewhere. Together with John Collinson Nesfield's Brief view of the caste system of the North-Western Provinces and Oudh, published in 1885, Ibbetson's 1883 Report was influential in bringing about a change in categorisation method throughout the country. Ibbetson argued against the contemporary understanding of caste and the 1891 census adopted classification by occupation rather than the Brahmanic system. He argued that the conventional belief in caste as a purely Hindu construct was erroneous, that people who had converted from Hinduism to Islam remained affected by the system, and that therefore it should be viewed more as a social than a religious mechanism. Furthermore, he believed that the varna categories of Brahmin, Kshatriya, Vaishya and Shudra were not reflected in reality, and that indeed it was likely that Kshatriya no longer existed and Vaishya certainly did not. He pointed out that there were Brahmins who were viewed as being outcastes even by the lowest ritual rank, the Shudra, and that the latter term was primarily used as a form of abuse rather than in any categorical sense. Finally, he argued that the contemporary belief that caste and the ritual ranks associated with it were inherited had no basis in fact, that different generations could have different identities and that the ancient basis of castes probably lay in shared origins of a tribal nature and were akin to guilds.

Despite their influence on the processes adopted for the 1891 census, the ideas of Ibbetson and Nesfield subsequently lost favour in the administration of the British Raj. Bates says that

not only did [classification by occupation] allow for the possibility of unhealthily egalitarian conclusions about the ethnic mixing of the Indian population, and the possibilities for change in economic and social status, but it also directly conflicted with the racist ideas about Indian social structure that had by then been largely confirmed in the minds of administrators by more than a generation of anecdotal writing. The response was to seek for a new method that would confirm 'scientifically' what were now ingrained prejudices.

The anecdotal evidence of a racial basis for caste, which could be traced back to the late-18th century speculations of William Jones, was being buttressed by the relatively new field of study known as anthropometry and this gave rise to a form of scientific racism epitomised by the work of people such as Herbert Hope Risley, who became Census Commissioner for India in 1901. Bates remarks that Ibbetson's "classification of castes, however logical and useful it might have proven, lacked a 'scientific' basis, as well as completely neglecting the problem of status." In the longer term, however, Ibbetson's theories have attracted support from John Henry Hutton and Edmund Leach and have been "cherished by successive generations of non-Marxist, non-Dumontian historians and anthropologists working in the classical British tradition of structural-functionalism, first established by Radcliffe Brown."

His written works include A Glossary of the Tribes and Castes of the Punjab and North-West Frontier Province. Based on the census report for the Punjab, 1883 with Horace Arthur Rose and Sir Edward Maclagan, and Panjab castes, being a reprint of the chapter on "The races, castes, and tribes of the people" in the report on the census of the Panjab. The latter was a posthumous reprint of a section of his 1883 report on the 1881 census of the Punjab.

== See also ==
- Census of India prior to independence
