= Rangachari =

Rangachari or Ranga Chari is one of the Indian names:

- C. R. Rangachari was an Indian fast bowler in Test cricket.
- K. Rangachari was an Indian ethnologist who served as Assistant Superintendent of the Madras museum.
- T. Rangachari was an Indian lawyer, politician, journalist, legislator and Indian independence activist.
