= Rugby union in Myanmar =

Rugby was established in modern Burma in 2013, with the establishment of the Yangon Dragons club. The club was co-founded by Dave Smith, Philip Blackwood and Henri de Lorme. Smith also popularized rugby in the Philippines with the Cebu Dragons club .

== Colonial history ==
During British rule in Burma (1824–1948), rugby was played by British colonists and soldiers in Burma. In the early 20th century, Kwasi Kwarteng notes that the Gymkhana Club played rugby against the military garrison, "their only opponents". The Myanmar Times notes that Herbert Thirkell White (lieutenant governor of Burma 1905–1910) had stated: “To think of hot-headed Burmans engaged in the rough-and-tumble of Rugby excites lurid imaginings.”

== Indochine Cup 2018 ==
After 5 years the Yangon Dragons hosted the first ever international rugby tournament in the history of the country.
