= Bibliography of Varanasi =

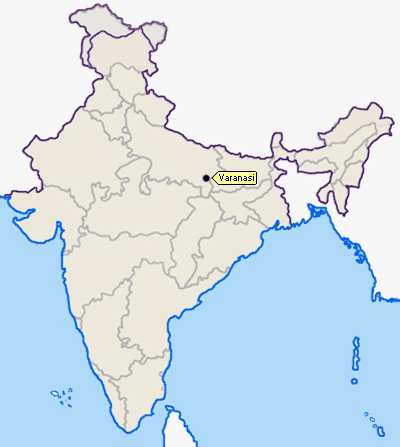

This is a bibliography of notable works about Varanasi.

== Bibliography ==
- Agrawala, Vasudeva Sharana (1984). Varanasi Seals and Sealings. Prithivi Prakashan.
- Alley, S. H. (1951). Banaras: hidden places of the holy city, Kashi.
- Banks, Marcus; Morphy, Howard (1999). Rethinking Visual Anthropology. Yale University Press. ISBN 978-0-300-07854-1.
- Bedi, Rajesh; Keay, John (1987). Banaras, city of Shiva. Brijbasi Printers Private Limited. ISBN 9788171070077.
- Bhatia, Suresh (2008). Sarnath, Varanasi and Kausambi: a pilgrim's guide book. Indica Books. ISBN 978-81-86569-77-1.
- Bhaṭṭācārya, Brajamādhaba (1 December 1999). Varanasi Rediscovered. Munshiram Manoharlal Publishers. ISBN 978-81-215-0860-5.
- Callewaert, Winand M.; Schilder, Robert (1 January 2000). Banaras: Vision of a Living Ancient Tradition. Hemkunt Press. ISBN 978-81-7010-302-8.
- Chakravorty, P. M. (1969). Banaras, the most ancient city of the world. Orient Publishers.
- Dar, Shivanandan Lal; Somaskandan, S. (1966). History of the Banaras Hindu University. Banaras Hindu University. ISBN 9788185305226.
- Desai, Madhuri (2007). Resurrecting Banaras: Urban Space, Architecture and Religious Boundaries. ISBN 978-0-549-52839-5.
- Dodson, Michael S. (23 March 2012). Banaras: Urban Forms and Cultural Histories. Taylor & Francis. ISBN 978-0-415-69377-6.
- Eck, Diana L. (1982). Banaras, City of Light. Columbia University Press. ISBN 978-0-231-11447-9.
- Freitag, Sandria B. (2 November 1992). Culture and Power in Banaras: Community, Performance, and Environment, 1800-1980. University of California Press. ISBN 978-0-520-08094-2.
- Ganeri, Anita (1 December 1993). Benares. Dillon Press. ISBN 978-0-87518-573-6.
- Good Earth Varanasi City Guide. Eicher Goodearth Limited. 2002. ISBN 978-81-87780-04-5.
- Ghosal, Pranati (1 January 2006). Śākta contribution to Varanasi. Jñāna-Pravāha Centre for Cultural Studies and Research. ISBN 978-81-246-0343-7.
- —— (1 January 2006). Vaiṣṇava Contribution to Varanasi. Jñāna-Pravāha, Centre for Cultural Studies and Research. ISBN 978-81-246-0342-0.
- Gupta, Subhadra Sen (1 May 2004). Varanasi: A Pilgrimage to Light. Rupa & Co. ISBN 978-81-291-0165-5.
- Havell, E. B. (30 March 2006). Benares The Sacred City: Sketches Of Hindu Life And Religion With Many Illustrations. Kessinger Publishing. ISBN 978-1-4254-1816-8.
- Hertel, Bradley R. (1993). Living Banaras: Hindu Religion in Cultural Context. SUNY Press. ISBN 978-0-7914-1331-9.
- Jayaswal, Vidula (2009). Ancient Varanasi: an archaeological perspective (excavations at Aktha). Aryan Books International. ISBN 978-81-7305-355-9.
- Kennedy, James (1 January 2000). Life and Work in Benares and Kumaon, 1839-1877. Library of Alexandria. ISBN 978-1-4655-3200-8.
- Kuber Nath Sukul (1974). Varanasi Down the Ages. Kameshwar Nath Sukul.
- Lannoy, Richard (1999). Benares seen from within. University of Washington Press. ISBN 978-0-295-97835-2.
- —— (1 August 2002). Benares: A World Within a World : the Microcosm of Kashi, Yesterday and Today. Indica Books. ISBN 978-81-86569-25-2.
- Medhasananda (2002). Varanasi at the crossroads: a panoramic view of early modern Varanasi and the story of its transition. Ramakrishna Mission, Institute of Culture. ISBN 978-81-87332-18-3.
- Michell, George; Singh, Rana P. B.; Arni, Clare (2005). Banaras, the city revealed. Marg Publications on behalf of the National Centre for the Performing Arts.
- Mishra, Kamala Prasad (1 January 1975). Banaras in transition, 1738-1795: a socioeconomic study. Munshiram Manoharlal Publishers.
- Pandey, Rajbali (1969). Varanasi, The Heart of Hinduism. Orient Publishers.
- Parker, Arthur (1901). A hand-book of Benares. Travancore Government Press.
- Parry, Jonathan P. (7 July 1994). Death in Banaras. Cambridge University Press. ISBN 978-0-521-46625-7.
- Partridge, Christopher Hugh (2005). Introduction To World Religions. Fortress Press. ISBN 978-0-8006-3714-9.
- Prasad, Onkar (1987). Folk music and folk dances of Banaras. Anthropological Survey of India.
- Ratnakar P (1 February 2002). Banaras, Sarnath. Roli Books Pvt Ltd, India. ISBN 978-81-7436-051-9.
- Renold, Leah (2005). A Hindu education: early years of the Banaras Hindu University. Oxford University Press. ISBN 978-0-19-567483-5.
- Sharma, Ramesh Chandra; Ghosal, Pranati (1 January 2006). Jaina contribution to Varanasi. Jñāna-Pravāha, Centre for Cultural Studies and Research. ISBN 978-81-246-0341-3.
- Singh, Birendra Pratap (1985). Life in ancient Varanasi: an account based on archaeological evidence. Sundeep Prakashan.
- Singh, Ram Dular (1986). Bengal and Varanasi: a study of cultural synthesis & national integration : Bengal's contribution to Varanasi. Bibliographical Society of India.
- Singh, Rana P. B.; Gutschow, Niels (1 October 2009). Banaras: Making of India's Heritage City. Cambridge Scholars. ISBN 978-1-4438-1321-1.
- Vijayabhāskararāvu, Vāḍapalli (2004). The walking Shiva of Varanasi: life, legends & teachings of Trailingaswami. Richa Prakashan.

== See also ==
- Bibliography of India
- History of India
- Indian literature
- Indology
- in Wikiversity →Varanasi Bibliography
