= A Glossary of the Tribes and Castes of the Punjab and North-West Frontier Province =

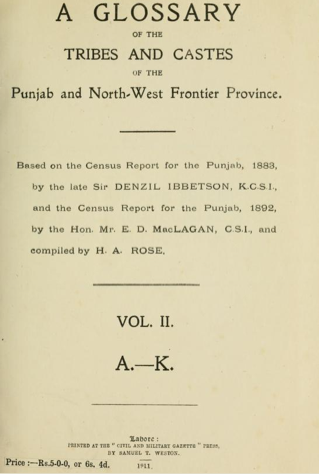
- Author: Horace Arthur Rose
- Language: English
- Genre: Encyclopedia
- Publisher: 1st ed. was printed by Government Printing Press Lahore (1911)
- Publication date: 1911
- Publication place: England
- Media type: Print (hardcover)
- Pages: 1st ed. (1911) More than 1100 pp (hardcover)

A Glossary of the Tribes and Castes of the Punjab and North-West Frontier Province is an ethnological study of areas of present-day Pakistan and India. It was compiled by Indian Civil Service administrator Horace Arthur Rose during the British Raj, based on the 1883 and 1892 census reports for the Punjab. It was originally published in Lahore at a price of 22 shillings for the three-volume set. The first volume was published in 1911 and the third volume, containing ethnographical accounts by Sir Denzil Ibbetson and Sir Edward MacLagan, was published in 1919.

Topics covered include the races of the Himalayas and Sivalik Hills, Lamaism, Buddhism, sects of Jains, Nag-Worship, Hindu philosophy, Islamic practices and the religious history of Islam, Sufi orders, the Legend of Dulla Bhatti, versions of Mirza and Sahiban, and other subjects.
