= Bibliography of Ganges =

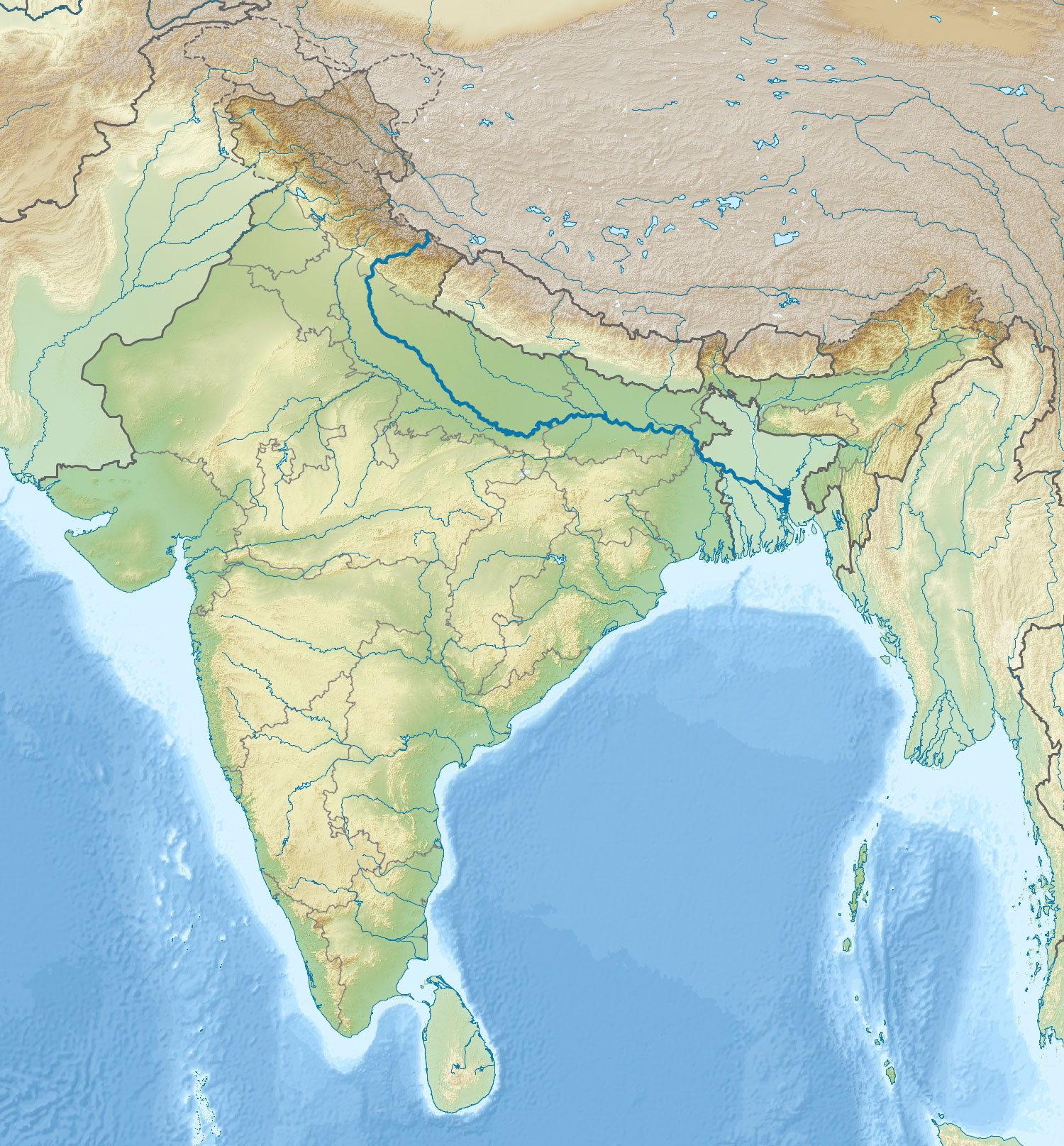

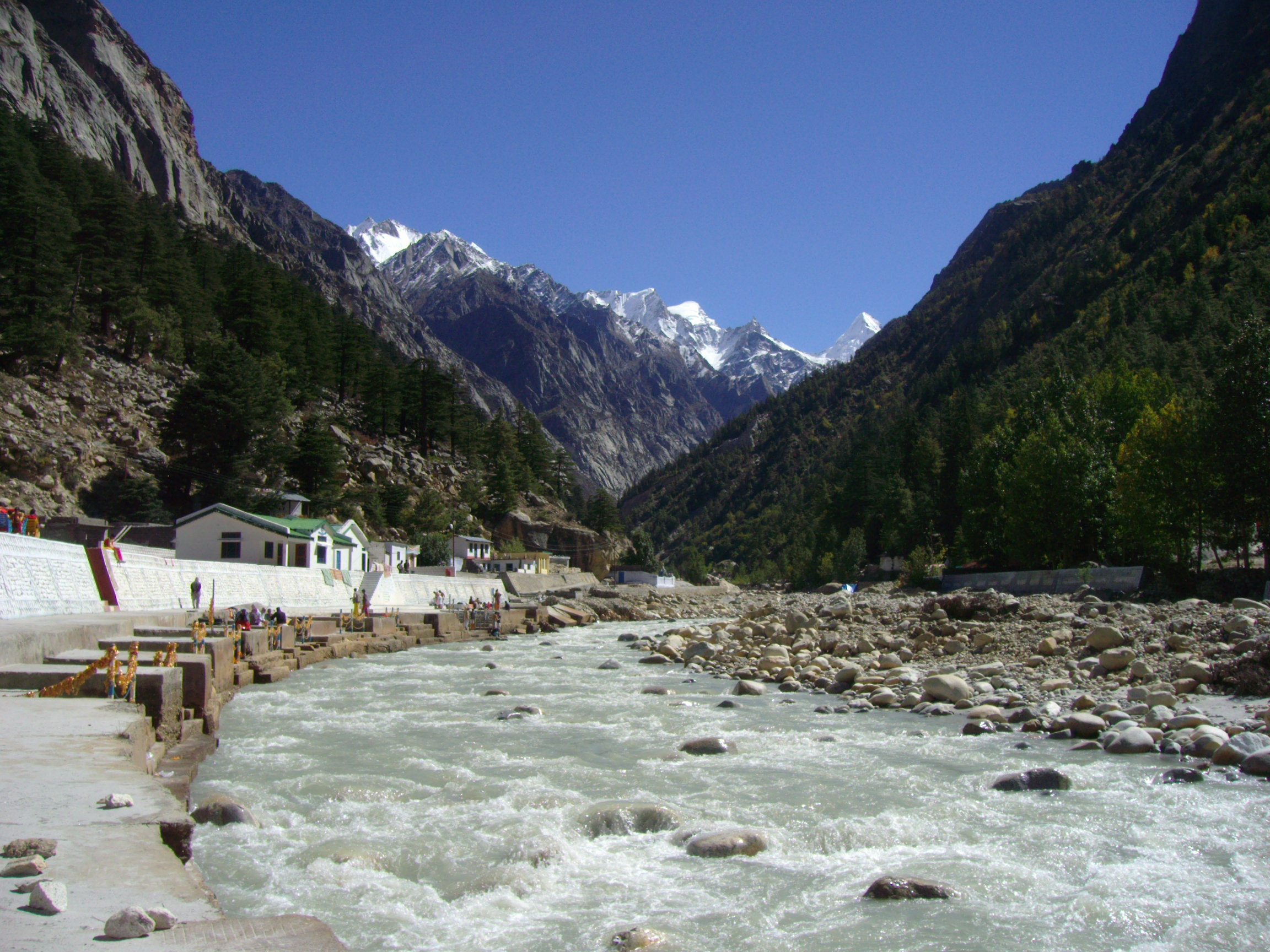
River Ganges at Gangotri

Ganges is one of the main rivers of India and the largest in northern India. The Hindu people consider the river as an embodiment of sacredness. Numerous books have been written on the river in English and various Indian languages which deal with its religious, geographical and other aspects. This article contains a list of the books where the river Ganges has been the primary topic of discussion.

== Books ==
=== A–M ===
Book	Author/Editor	Publisher	ISBN
A Ganges of the Mind: A Journey on the River of Dreams	Steven G. Darian	Ratna Sagar	ISBN 978-81-7070-033-3
A Picturesque Tour Along the Rivers Ganges and Jumna in India ...	Lieut. colon Forrest	Ackermann	
Along the Ganges	Ilija Trojanow	Haus Pub.	ISBN 978-1-906598-91-4
A Walk Along The Ganges	Dennison Berwick	Dennison Berwick	ISBN 978-0-7137-1968-0
An account of the fishes found in the river Ganges and its branches	Francis Hamilton	Printed for A. Constable and company	
Bend in the Ganges	Monohar Malgonkar	Ind-Us	
Cooking Along the Ganges: The Vegetarian Heritage of India	Malvi Doshi	iUniverse	ISBN 978-1-4759-0308-9
Daughter of the Ganges: The Story of One Girl's Adoption and Her Return Journey to India	Asha Miro	Simon and Schuster	ISBN 978-1-4165-2494-6
From the Ganges to the Snake River	Debu Majumdar	Caxton Press	ISBN 978-0-87004-397-0
Ganga	Julian Crandall Hollick	Random House India, 2007	ISBN 978-8-18400-003-0
Ganga: A Journey Down the Ganges River	Julian Crandall Hollick	Island Press, 2008	ISBN 978-1-59726-386-3
Ganges	Authors: Jon Nicholson, Ian Gray, Sharmila Choudhury; Coauthors: Tom Hugh-Jones, Dan Rees	BBC Books	
Ganges Boy	Archana Prasanna	Morgan James Publishing	ISBN 978-1-938467-38-7
Ganges Canal: A Disquisition on the Heads of the Ganges and Jumna Canals, North-western Provinces, in Reply to Strictures by Major-General Sir Arthur Cotton	Sir Proby Thomas Cautley	Private circulation	
Ganges River Dolphins	Kristin Petrie	ABDO	ISBN 978-1-59928-039-4
Life by the Ganges: or, Faith and victory	Hannah Catherine Mullens	Presbyterian publication committee	
Living on the Ganges River	Louise A. Spilsbury and Richard Spilsbury	Heinemann-Raintree Library	ISBN 978-1-4109-2820-7

=== N–Z ===
Book	Author/Editor	Publisher	ISBN
Pilgrimage: From the Ganges to Graceland : An Encyclopedia	Linda Kay Davidson and David Martin Gitlitz	ABC-CLIO	ISBN 978-1-57607-004-8
Settlements Of The Ganges River	Richard Spilsbury	Heinemann-Raintree Library	ISBN 978-1-4034-6526-9
Swallowing the River Ganges: A Practice Guide to the Path of Purification	Matthew Flickstein	Wisdom Publications	ISBN 978-0-86171-776-7
The call of the Ganges	Somadatta Bakhorī	Vikas	ISBN 978-0-7069-0724-7
The Ganges	Rob Bowden	Heinemann-Raintree Library	ISBN 978-0-7398-6070-0
The Ganges	David Cumming	World Almanac Library	ISBN 978-0-8368-5450-3
The Ganges	Gina Douglas	Rcl Benziger	ISBN 978-0-382-06205-6
The Ganges	Raghubir Singh	Thames & Hudson	ISBN 978-0-500-28410-0
The Ganges: A Personal Encounter	Edward Rice	Four Winds	ISBN 978-0-590-07240-3
The Ganges and the Seine: Scenes on the Banks of Both	Sidney Laman Blanchard	Chapman and Hall	
The Ganges Delta and its people	David Cumming	Thomson Learning	ISBN 978-1-56847-168-6
The Ganges: India's Sacred River	Molly Aloin	Crabtree Publishing Company	ISBN 978-0-7787-7466-2
The Ganges In Myth And History	Steven G. Darian	Motilal Banarsidass Publ.	ISBN 978-81-208-1757-9
The Ganges Water Diversion: Environmental Effects and Implications	Ema. Manirula Kādera Mirjā, M. Monirul Qader Mirza	Springer	ISBN 978-1-4020-2480-1
Where flows the Ganges: the story of John Samuel Whipple, missionary to India	Juanita Owen	Lakeland Color Press	

== See also ==
- Bibliography of India
