= Herbert Thirkell White =

Sir Herbert Thirkell White KCIE CSI
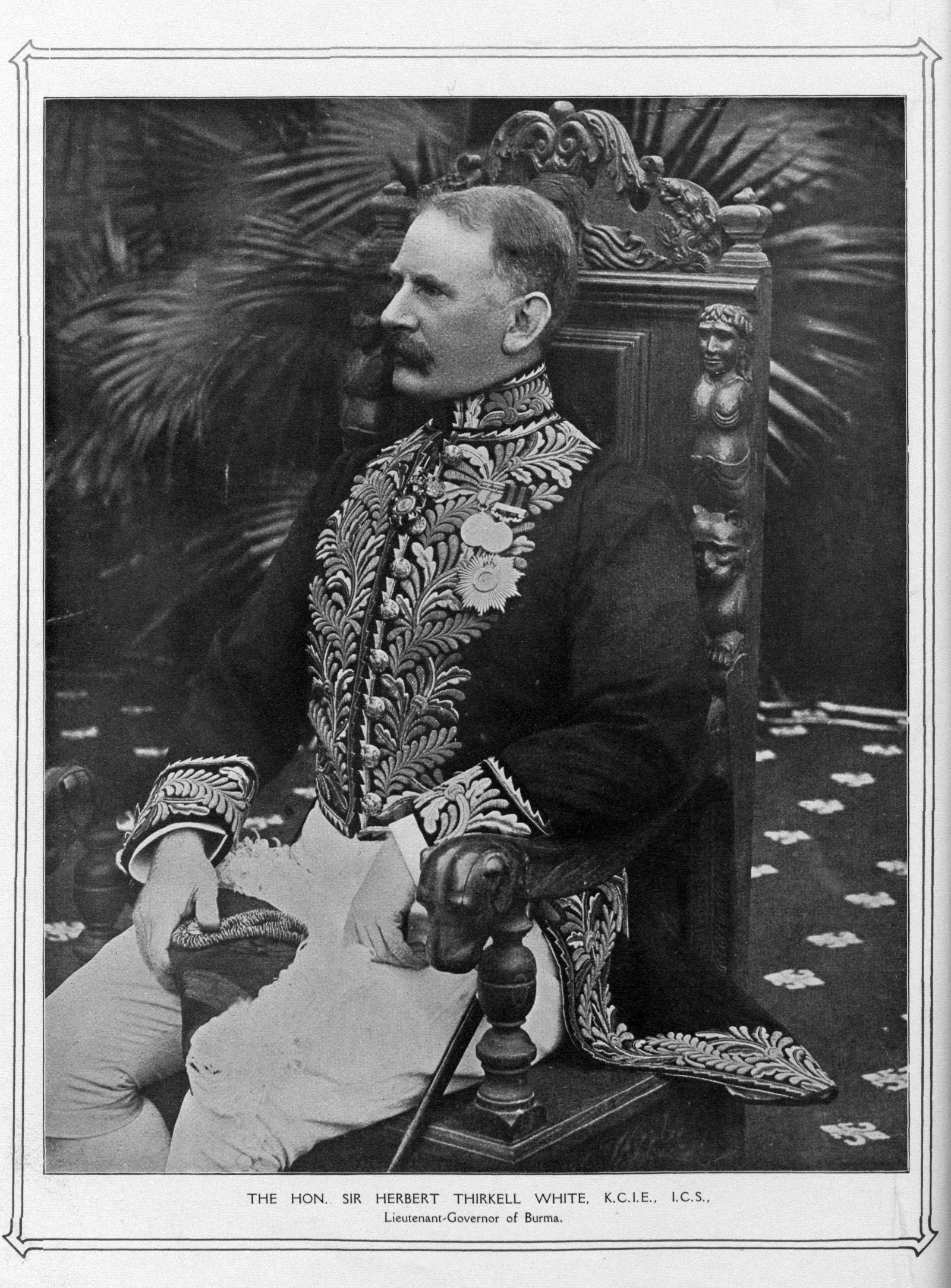

Lieutenant-Governor of Burma
- In office 9 May 1905 – 19 May 1910
- Preceded by: Hugh Shakespear Barnes
- Succeeded by: Harvey Adamson

Personal details
- Born: 1855
- Died: 1931 (aged 75–76)
- Spouse: Fannie Sophia Hawes (m. 1877–1931)
- Education: Dulwich College and Brasenose College
- Occupation: Administrator

Sir Herbert Thirkell White KCIE CSI (1855–1931) was the Lieutenant-Governor of the British Indian province of Burma (1905–1910) and author of works about Burma.

== Biography ==
The son of Richard White, he was educated at Dulwich College and Brasenose College, Oxford. White joined I.C.S., served in all lower grades of the public service and was posted as Commissioner, Burma-China Boundary, 1897; appointed Chief Judge of the Chief Court, Burma, 1900; Lieutenant-Governor of Burma, 1905–1910. During his time as Lieutenant Governor, he reduced the amount of the annual tributes from the Shan Chiefs and promoted education among them and carried out certain Railway Extensions in the Shan States. White was the Secretary to Upper Burma from 1886 to 1890, the period that was immediately after the annexation of Upper Burma by the British following the Third Anglo-Burmese War. Other offices he held in Burma included the Chief Secretary of Burma and as a justice on various Burmese courts. White was also a member of the 1897-98 boundary commission between Britain and China.

White was appointed a Companion of the Order of the Indian Empire (CIE) in 1892, and promoted to a Knight Commander of the order (KCIE) in the 1903 Durbar Honours.

He married Fannie Sophia Hawes, daughter of Captain William Hawes, Indian Navy in 1877. After his years in Burma, he returned to England and lived in St. Ives, where he died in 1932.

White was the author of several books on Burma, the best known of which is the classic, A Civil Servant in Burma (E. Arnold, 1913), which is based on the 32 years (1878–1910) he spent as a civil servant in that province. White also authored the fourth volume Burma of the four volume series "Provincial Geographies of India" which was published between 1913 and 1923 from the Cambridge University Press under the editorship of Thomas Henry Holland.

== Titles ==
- 1855–1892: Herbert Thirkell White
- 1892–1902: Herbert Thirkell White, CSI
- 1903–1931: Sir Herbert Thirkell White, KCIE

== Published works ==
- A Civil Servant in Burma. London, E. Arnold (1913)
- Burma. Cambridge, The University Press (1923)

| Preceded by Sir Hugh Shakespear Barnes | Lieutenant Governor of British Crown Colony of Burma; 1905–1910 | Succeeded by Sir Harvey Adamson |
