= Castes and Tribes of Southern India =

Castes and Tribes of South India

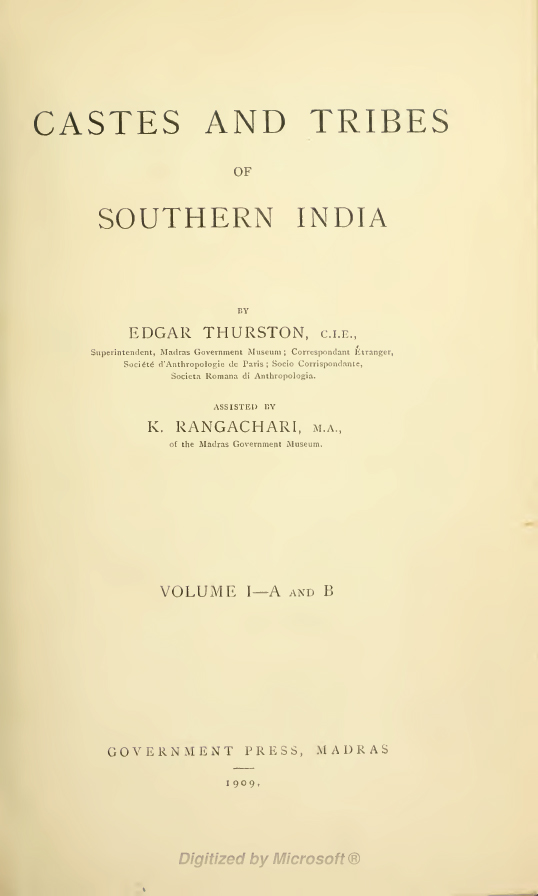
- Title page of the first volume of Castes and Tribes of Southern India
- Author: Edgar Thurston, K. Rangachari
- Language: English
- Genre: encyclopedia
- Publication date: 1909
- Publication place: British India
- Media type: Print (hardback)

Castes and Tribes of Southern India is a seven-volume encyclopedia of social groups of Madras Presidency and the princely states of Travancore, Mysore, Coorg and Pudukkottai published by British museologist Edgar Thurston and K. Rangachari in 1909.

== Background ==
The seven-volume work was one of several such publications resulting from the Ethnographic Survey of India project which was formally instituted by the Government of British India in 1901. The Survey was intended to record details of the manners, customs and physical features of Indian castes and tribes using in part the anthropometric methods that had first been used in India by Herbert Hope Risley for his own survey of the tribes and castes of Bengal. An eight-year period of funding was allotted for the purpose.

The British government in India appointed a Superintendent of Ethnography for each province. Thurston, who had been Superintendent of the Madras Government Museum since 1885, had already conducted some ethnographic work in his studies of the hill tribes of Nilgiris District, published in 1894, and elsewhere. He was appointed Superintendent for Madras Presidency, while L. K. Ananthakrishna Iyer and N. Subramania Iyer were respectively appointed Superintendents for the princely states of Cochin and Travancore. The reports for the two princely states were later integrated with Thurston's work to form the Castes and Tribes of Southern India, as were the results of Thurston's earlier researches into the hill tribes. The state of Mysore was allocated to Thurston for anthropometric survey but excluded for ethnographic survey. In his investigations in Madras Presidency, Thurston was assisted by K. Rangachari of the Government Museum.

== Survey ==
Thurston investigated the characteristics of over 300 castes and tribes of South India, representing over 40 million people across an area of 150,000 square miles (390,000 km^{2}). He was a disciple of Risley, who believed in a racial theory for the basis of caste, and borrow anthropometric equipment from the Asiatic Society of Bengal, including a Lovibond Tintometer, to assist in his survey of Madras. Thurston had to overcome suspicions felt by his subjects during the conduct of the survey, and sometimes had to rely on his official position as a representative of the government in order to obtain the measurements that he needed. Some believed that Thurston had been sent on a mission to kill them in order then to display their stuffed bodies in the Madras museum, while others considered his measuring to be a prelude to their recruitment into the army or to kidnap them, and yet others thought that the equipment used to measure their height was a gallows. A consequence of these difficulties was that his sample size was often as low as 30 – 60 members of a caste or tribe, and sometimes as little as six or seven.

== Reactions ==
Nature magazine, in its September 1910 issue, described the work as

a monumental record of the varied phases of south Indian tribal life, the traditions, manners and customs of people. Though in some respects it may be corrected or supplemented by future research it will long retain its value as an example of out-door investigation, and will remain a veritable mine of information, which will be of value.

More recently, Crispin Bates has said that Thurston generally displayed "often lurid, orientalist imaginings" in his writings and has noted of the publications produced as a consequence of the Ethnographic Survey that

One of the most ludicrous was Thurston's study of southern India. Thurston was the curator of the government museum in Madras, and clearly saw the study of racial types among the Indians as an extension of his daily routine of labelling and pinning butterflies and of collecting and categorising the varieties of plants.

== See also ==
- William Crooke
- Horace Arthur Rose
- Robert Vane Russell
- The People of India
