= Henry Scholberg =

American librarian and writer (1921–2012)

- Born: Henry Cedric Scholberg; May 29, 1921; Darjeeling, India
- Died: August 4, 2012 (aged 91); New Brighton, Minnesota
- Occupation: Bibliographer

Henry Cedric Scholberg (May 29, 1921 – August 4, 2012) was director and librarian of the Ames Library of South Asia at the University of Minnesota. His works include bibliographies on Indian encyclopedias, on manuals and gazetteers of India, and on the Portuguese in India. He also authored other scholarly works, plays and novels, as well as his own memoirs.

== Life ==
=== India ===
Henry Cedric Scholberg was born in Darjeeling, British India, on May 29, 1921 (Note: Scholberg says in his memoirs that he returned to Darjeeling in 1964 and obtained his birth certificate, discovering that he had been listed as a "European Christian boy". He says "Well, they got the boy part right." Prima facie, this statement appears to contradict Todd Tucker, who says that Scholberg was a Methodist, at least at the time of the Minnesota Starvation Experiment.) and grew up speaking Hindi before he could speak English. Bearing the same first name as his father, Henry Caesar Scholberg, he was known as Cedric from childhood until the 1950s. (Note: Henry Caesar Scholberg also published a scholarly work, being a grammar of the Hindi language.) His parents were patriotic Methodist missionaries from the United States, working at a time of considerable turmoil during the campaign for Indian independence. His childhood experiences, and in particular the acts of Mahatma Gandhi, influenced his pacifist tendencies: Todd Tucker says that as a child Scholberg "personally witnessed how nonviolent tactics could bring about concrete political change. The experience would stay with him his entire life."

Scholberg attended Woodstock School, a Presbyterian boarding school in Mussoorie that commonly took the children of missionaries. He found it to be a miserable experience at times. In a naive gesture, reflecting the commonplace antipathy towards British governance in India and despite his pacifism, he was among a group of schoolboys who executed the Nazi salute on being told by their headmaster of the beginnings of World War II; Germany was opposed to Britain and that was sufficient justification in their minds.

=== United States ===
After finishing at Woodstock in 1939, Scholberg left his parents in India, sailing on the SS President Taft to enroll at the University of Illinois, close to where his sister lived. His attendance enabled him to avoid military conscription until 1943 when he graduated with a B.A. in history. At that time, he registered as a conscientious objector, much to the annoyance of his parents.

As an objector, Scholberg was ordered to join the Civilian Public Service (CPS), through which he became one of the test subjects in the Minnesota Starvation Experiment from 1944. This was his first experience of the University of Minnesota, having previously had CPS postings in a conservation camp at Lagro, Indiana, and a mental institution in Maryland. He saw the Experiment as a relief from his work in mental health, which was increasingly giving him concern about his own mental state, and as a sacrifice befitting that being made by those of his countrymen who were engaged in the war. He later said that

Here we are in the middle of a war. Every day we're reading of casualties on both sides, and I thought here are Americans like me dying in the battlefield for their country, and what was I doing? Working in a mental hospital? And here was a chance, I thought, to do something that required sacrifice.

When he underwent a psychological assessment for acceptance on the Experiment, based on the then new Minnesota Multiphasic Personality Inventory method, it was determined that he had psychotic tendencies, including depression, hypochondria and hysteria. He became one of the 36 selected test subjects. Another was Jasper "Jay" Garner, who by chance happened to have been at Woodstock School with Scholberg as an eight-year-old.

Scholberg enrolled in graduate-level courses to learn French while he was involved in the year-long experiment, having soon exhausted the possibilities of the beginners' classes that were offered by a fellow test subject, the Princeton University graduate Sam Legg. During the course of the experiment, his weight dropped from 145 pounds (66 kg) to 117 pounds (53 kg).

In 1954, Scholberg was awarded a B.S. in Social Sciences from the University of Minnesota. He added an M.A. in Library Science from the same university in 1962. After some time spent as a librarian and athletics coach at Columbia Heights High School in Minnesota, Scholberg returned to the University of Minnesota in 1961 as the first director of the Ames Library of South Asia, whose collection had recently been donated to the university by Charles Leslie Ames.

A series of promotions through the academic ranks led to him becoming a full professor in 1979. He became a professor emeritus when he retired in 1986, at which time he also relinquished his position as director of the library. During his time in office, the library's collections grew from 25,000 items to over 105,000.

Scholberg died on August 4, 2012, in New Brighton, Minnesota, six years after suffering head injuries in a cycling accident. Among his caregivers at the nursing home were people from Nepal, who gave him much pleasure by speaking to him in Hindi, the language he always considered his first. His wife of 61 years, Phyllis, survived him. The couple had three children.

== Works ==
=== Academic ===
Scholberg said of researching archives and living abroad in the pursuit of academic knowledge that "If you're not enjoying it, you are not doing it right." He traveled to over 40 countries, often with his family, and had extended periods of residence in India (1964 and 1976) and Paris (1967 and 1969).

He spent four years researching The District Gazetteers of British India: A Bibliography, which was tied in with a large-scale attempt by the International Documentation Company to publish on microfilm the censuses, gazetteers and reports of the British colonial period. It was that company which published his work in 1970. He noted that there were around 1,300 gazetteers produced by the British in India between 1822 and 1947, when India gained independence. Intended for administrative use as well as for the general public, they can only loosely be described as systematic and they were not all published by government bodies.

The methods, styles, and formats of compilation varied even within districts. His bibliography, which included brief histories of how their compilation evolved and attempts to identify the myriad of authors and editors, is arranged by province or its administrative equivalent and, according to a review by N. Gerald Barrier, "surmounts substantial organisational problems" and is a "painstaking study". Barrier was critical of some aspects of the work, citing as examples the omission of a substantially revised gazetteer for Amritsar and also the lack of information relating to pagination or publication, other than date. Barrier notes that the completeness of the work was marred because Scholberg may not have had access to S. B. Chaudhuri's History of the Gazetteers, which had been published in 1965.

Scholberg's Bibliographie des Français dans l'Inde was published in 1973 by the Historical Society of Pondicherry. His co-author was Emmanuel Divien. In 1982, Promilla published a bibliography of Goa and the Portuguese in India, being the collaborative work of Scholberg, Archana Kakodker, and Carmo Azevedo. This represented eight years' of work, identified sources in over 80 locations, in numerous languages, and included unpublished doctoral theses and material dating as far back as the 16th century. More than 90,000 miles (140,000 km) of travel was necessary for its compilation. John Villiers noted in a review that Scholberg had already demonstrated "ample evidence of his abilities as a bibliographer" and that this bibliography included various papers written by experts on aspects of Indo-Portuguese historiography.

Scholberg's work on India encyclopedias – The Encyclopedias of India – was published by Promilla in 1986 and was described by a reviewer, Ruth Bowden, as an "encyclopedia of encyclopedias". It detailed 47 such works, produced between around the tenth-century AD and the 20th century. These comprised various languages, including one in Assamese, six in Bengali, three in Gujarati, four in Hindi, three in Kannada, four in Malayalam, six in Marathi, five in Oriya, one in Punjabi, six in Sanskrit, two in Tamil, four in Telugu, and two in Urdu.

In addition to the above, Scholberg's academic works include:

- Calcutta, 1851. Writers Workshop. 1976.
- Henry Scholberg (1978). A directory of Asian and African librarians in North America. Asian and African Section ACRL/ALA.
- South Asia Biographical Dictionary Index (Bibliotheca Asiatica). International Documentation Company. 1987. ISBN 9783300000031. (two volumes)
- Henry Scholberg (January 1, 1993). The Indian Literature of the Great Rebellion. Promilla & Company, Publishers. ISBN 978-81-85002-18-7.
- Tibet. 1995.
- Fortress Portugal in India: A photographic history of the Portuguese forts of India. NorthStar Publications. 1995.
- Henry Scholberg (1998). The biographical dictionary of greater India. Promilla & Co. ISBN 978-81-85002-23-1.

He also wrote reviews and articles for scholarly journals such as the Journal of Asian Studies.

=== Fiction ===
Works of fiction by Scholberg include:

- The Golden Bells: Two Plays for Christmas.
- Katie Luther: A One-Act Play about Luther's Wife.
- Henry Scholberg (1977). Saroja: A Play in Three Countries. Writers Workshop.
- Henry Scholberg (June 1, 1994). A Hindi Movie. Indus, an imprint of HarperCollins Publishers India. ISBN 978-81-7223-097-5.
- The Return of the Raj. HarperCollins. 1995.
- In the Time of Trial: Two Plays for Lent or Good Friday. 2001.
- Henry Scholberg (January 1, 2005). Ramu, an Indian Boy's Story. Bibliophile South Asia. ISBN 978-81-85002-59-0.

=== Memoirs ===
- That's India: The Memoirs of an Old India Hand. Bibliophile South Asia. 2002. ISBN 9788185002309.
