= Dennison Berwick =

British sailor

Storyteller Dennison Berwick

Kuan Yin at anchor, Toronto 2007

Dennison Berwick (born 19 May 1956 in West Yorkshire, England) is an author and travel writer. Educated at Trinity College, Glenalmond, he emigrated to Canada in 1980. Since then he has walked the entire length of the river Ganges in India ( the 3000 km walk is recounted in A walk along the Ganges) and travelled extensively in the Amazon and (journeys that were described in Amazon and Savages: The Life and Killing of the Yanomami). He is also editor of the Canadian Retreat Guide, a guide to more than 140 monasteries, retreat centres etc. in Canada. He spent several weeks helping people in the isolated villages on the west coast of Aceh, Sumatra, following the devastating tsunami in December 2004 and is now working on a novel inspired by those experiences. He lived most of the year on his boat "Kuan Yin" (a Tahitiana 32) which he did 2015. He continued working on a new book about Labrador. After many years of practical experience with marine diesel engines he undertook a formal course in Marine mechanics. Most recent book publication is Marine Diesel Basics 1.

== Bibliography ==
- 2009 Staying Home, How to Get Away Without Going Away published Voyage Press, Toronto. ISBN 978-0-9811233-0-1.
- 1986 A Walk Along the Ganges published. ISBN 0-8364-5916-4
- 1990 Amazon published. Hutchinson, London, 1990 ISBN 0-09-173490-8
- 1992 Savages, the Life & Killing of the Yanomami published. ISBN 0-340-57868-8.
- 1998 Canadian Retreat Guide, 2nd edition, published. ISBN 0-9680541-1-0

== Biography ==
- 2009 qualified RYA Yachtmaster Offshore
- 2006 bought "Kuan Yin", a Tahitiana 32, steel ketch.
- 2002 to 2004 Bought first boat "Karuna", a South Coast 36, in Langkawi, Malaysia and lived aboard, sailing Andaman Sea. Sold her shortly before the 2004 Indian Ocean tsunami
- 2000 Learned to sail in Toronto harbour
- 1995 to 1999 Built and operated Still Life Retreat in rural Ontario, Canada
- 1989 to 1993 Lived in Lisbon, Portugal.
- 1986 to 1991 Travelled in the Amazon.
- 1983 to 1984 Solo pilgrimage 3,000 km along banks of River Ganges, India.
- 1980 Emigrated to Canada.
- 1976 to 1978 Reporter and columnist on Telegraph & Argus, Bradford, England.
- 1976 Overland to Turkey, Iran and Afghanistan.
- 1974 to 1975 Hitch-hiked solo, Cape Town to Cairo.
