= The Argumentative Indian =

Book by Amartya Sen

- Author: Amartya Sen
- Language: English
- Publisher: Allen Lane
- Publication date: June 2, 2005
- Pages: 334
- ISBN: 978-0-7139-9687-6
- OCLC: 57750786

The Argumentative Indian is a book written by Nobel Prize winning Indian economist Amartya Sen. It is a collection of essays that discuss India's history and identity, focusing on the traditions of public debate and intellectual pluralism. Martha Nussbaum says the book "demonstrates the importance of public debate in Indian traditions generally."

The Argumentative Indian has brought together a selection of writings from Sen that outline the need to understand contemporary India in the light of its long argumentative tradition. The understanding and use of this argumentative tradition are critically important, Sen argues, for the success of India's democracy, the defence of its secular politics, the removal of inequalities related to class, caste, gender and community, and the pursuit of sub-continental peace.

== Contents ==
The book takes the form of four sections containing linked essays: "Voice and Heterodoxy", "Culture and Communication", "Politics and Protest", "Reason and Identity". The first section looks at the general culture of pluralistic debate within India, dating back to the Buddha and kings such as Ashoka. The second section seeks to restore the reputation of Rabindranath Tagore as an intellectual polymath, combining spiritual and political ideas, and explores India's relationship to other cultures, including the West and China, especially the peaceful and intellectually rewarding cross-fertilising relationship between the two great Asian cultures. The third section looks at conflicts of class and criticises inequalities in Indian society and arguments that have been used to justify them. Finally, the book explores modern cultures of secularism and liberalism in an Indian context.
