= Nag Dhunga =

Nag dhunga the sacred stone

A Nag Dhunga (or Nāga Dhunga) is a sacred stone worshipped by the people of Nepal. These stones - often basalt rocks or erratic boulders - can be found in the centre of many major cities, as well as in remote villages. Sometimes they are enclosed within an ornamental wrought iron fence, with a gate that can only be unlocked by the local priest or elder. In some places, such as Kathmandu Valley or Pokhara Valley, the Nag Dhunga can be found on the premises of a shrine, or a small pagoda-like temple. These temples are often popular with tourists.

The Nāga of Hindu mythology are serpent deities, and are the caretakers of lakes and water sources. Lord Shiva has a close association with the Nāga, and is often said to wear them as ornaments. The Nag Dhunga is a rock on which Lord Shiva once rested, identified as such by ancient Vedic priests, at a time when Brahmanism was spreading out from the Indian Subcontinent into the mountain regions of Nepal's Himalayas and to Mount Kailash in Tibet.

People are usually very proud to have a Nag Dhunga in their vicinity. They have picnics in front of it during festivals and decorate it with vermilion powder, flowers and small amounts of cash, and often offer milk, beaten rice and fruit to the Nāga that live under or inside the Dhunga. If a large snake is seen around the Dhunga they consider it a manifestation of the Nāga. If people in Nepal frequently encounter a cobra or similar snake at a certain spot, for example at a crossing of paths or beneath a holy Peepal tree, then they worship the spot where they have seen it by offering milk and boiled eggs. They mark the spot with vermilion as a sign for other passers by that they are at a Nāga crossing. Others will follow suit and place small offerings and conduct a puja (prayer ceremony). Those who are careless and do not notice such a crossing and who urinate or defecate near it will be punished by disease and bad luck. This belief is deeply entrenched in rural populations all over Nepal.

Many Nepalese villages and places have the word Nag, Naga or Dhunga added to their name. This always signifies that there is a sacred snake stone in their vicinity.

The technical perspective of naming of the Nag Dhunga might be due to presence of Ophiolite rocks, which appear to be snake-like. Ophiolite rocks are formed when two geological formations collide with each-other, and the older geological formation stays on top of younger geological formation which is actively moving. The geological fold on the top geological formation gives the appearance of shape of a snake. Also, due to movement of these geological formations, high pressure and heat is generated which causes the thermal alternation on rocks, giving the rocks texture that looks like some snake's skin. Thus, in these areas, the rocks are generally shaped like snake, and also with appearance like snake. The naming "Nag Dhunga" might be either due to presence of rocks with snake-like shape or appearance like a snake or both.
