= Edgar Thurston =

British zoologist and anthropologist

Edgar Thurston CIE
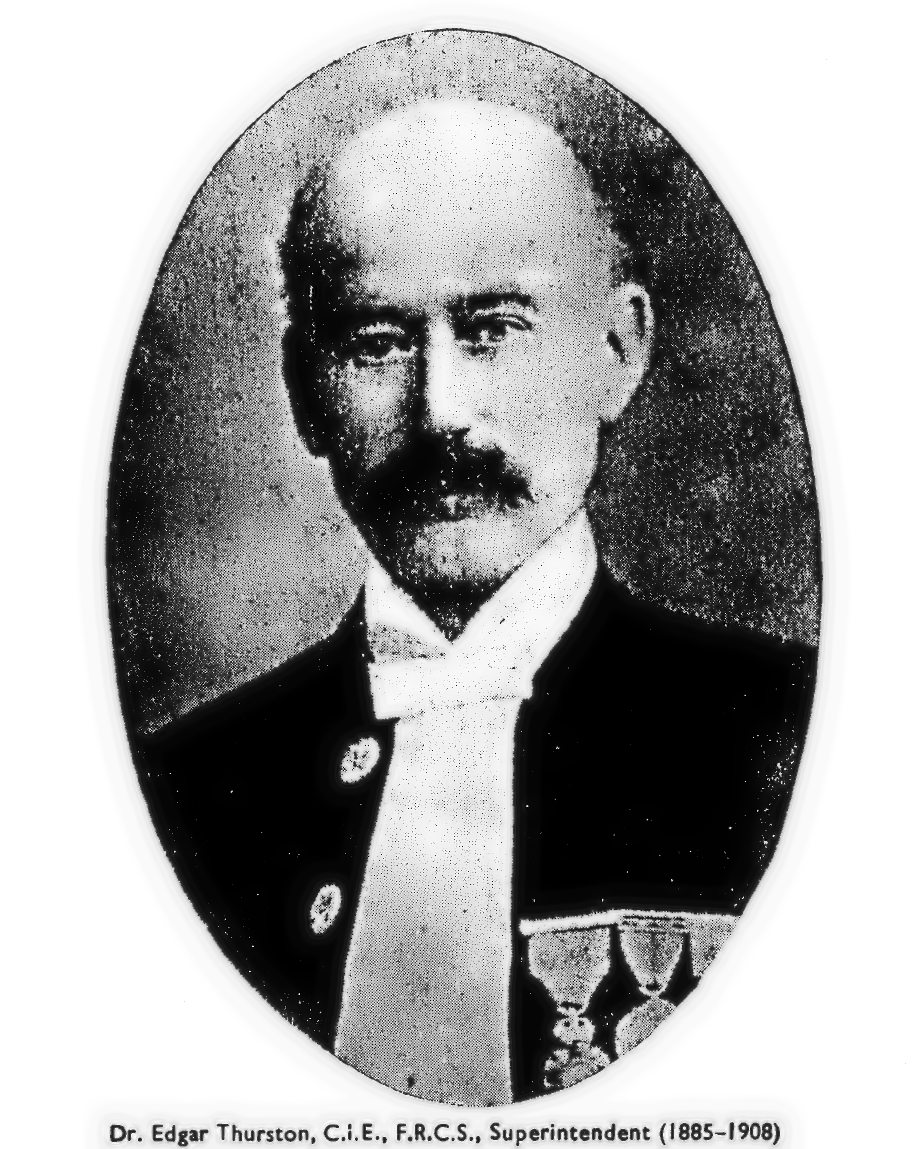

Superintendent of the Madras Government Museum and Connemara Public Library
- In office 1885–1908
- Preceded by: George Bidie
- Succeeded by: John Robertson Henderson

Personal details
- Born: 1855
- Died: 1935 (aged 79–80) Penzance, England
- Education: King's College, London
- Profession: Museum superintendent, zoologist, anthropologist

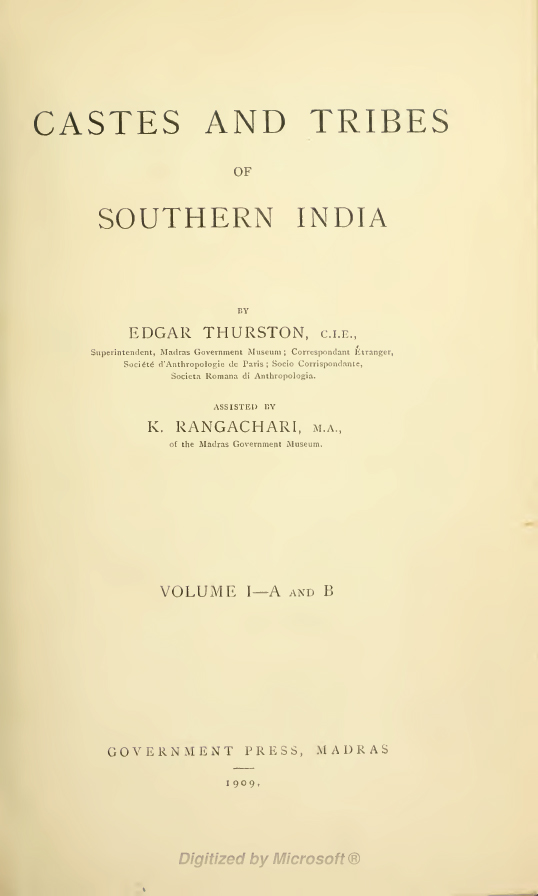
The title page of the first volume of Castes and Tribes of Southern India (1909).

Edgar Thurston CIE (1855– 12 October 1935) was the British Superintendent at the Madras Government Museum from 1885 to 1908 who contributed to research studies in the fields of zoology, ethnology and botany of India, and later also published his works at the museum. Thurston was educated in medicine and lectured in anatomy at the Madras Medical College while simultaneously holding a senior position at the museum. His early works were on numismatics and geology, and these were later followed by researches in anthropology and ethnography. He succeeded Frederick S. Mullaly as the Superintendent of Ethnography for the Madras Presidency.

== Early life ==
Edgar Thurston was the son of Charles Bosworth Thurston of Kew, London. Schooled at Eton College, he then studied medicine at King's College, London, qualifying as LRCP in 1877. He worked as a medical officer in Kent County Lunatic Asylum and became a curator of the museum at King's College before joining the Madras Museum in 1885 as a superintendent.

== Ethnography and geography ==
Whereas early European ideas on phrenology were applied to identify mental traits of individuals, advocates of scientific racism used what they considered to be more refined anthropometric measurements to identify castes. Thurston was one such person. He believed that intelligence was inversely proportional to the breadth of the nose and claimed that he scrutinised this as well as handwriting when recruiting clerks in his office. He gave lectures to the students of the Madras University and sometimes to the Madras Police on practical anthropology during the 1890s, and he trained the Madras Police in the use of anthropometry for criminal identification. The Bertillon system had already been incorporated in the Bengal and Madras Police departments by the 1890s and Thurston's training was intended to help the police identify membership of what were then termed as "criminal castes".

In 1901, Thurston was appointed to the Ethnographic Survey of India project, established at that time following the success of Herbert Hope Risley's Ethnographic Survey of Bengal. Risley was an adherent to the theories of scientific racism and had been appointed as director of Ethnology in India. Thurston worked as a part of this project to collect accurate anthropometric measurements. These included a number of measurements of the skull and derived indices or proportions such as the nasal index. He did this work alongside his role as superintendent of the Madras Museum, a position that he did not leave until 1908.

Among other published works, Thurston wrote the seven volumes of Castes and Tribes of Southern India, published in 1909 as part of the Ethnographic Survey of India. In that work he was assisted by K. Rangachari, a colleague from the Madras museum who had also assisted him in a 1906 ethnographic study, Ethnographic Notes in Southern India. Rangachari had supplied most of the forty photographs used in this earlier study. The September 1910 edition of Nature described the 1909 publication as

a monumental record of the varied phases of south Indian tribal life, the traditions, manners and customs of people. Though in some respects it may be corrected or supplemented by future research it will long retain its value as an example of out-door investigation, and will remain a veritable mine of information, which will be of value.

Thurston also authored The Madras Presidency, with Mysore Coorg, and the associated States, being the third volume of the four-volume series "Provincial Geographies of India" which was published between 1913–23 by the Cambridge University Press under the editorship of Thomas Henry Holland which included physical information and ethnographic notes.

== Botany and zoology ==
Thurston made numerous collections of plant and animals specimens, many of which were sent to the British Museum. In the late 1880s he was involved in studies on pearl fishing in the Gulf of Mannar. On a visit to Europe he sought to find electric lights that would work at a depth of 20 fathoms so as to assist in pearl harvesting. Some species have been named after him, including the marine organisms Manaria thurstoni (E.A. Smith, 1906), Sepia thurstoni (W. Adam & W. J. Rees, 1966), Mobula thurstoni (Lloyd, 1908), and Ecteinascidia thurstoni (Herdman, 1890). Also, a species of Indian snake, Gerrhopilus thurstoni (Boettger, 1890), is named in his honor.

The standard author abbreviation E.Thurst. is used to indicate this person as the author when citing a botanical name.

== Museum and art ==
Aside from his role at the Madras Museum, Thurston was for some time Honorary Secretary to the now-defunct Fine Arts Society of Madras and was influential in promoting the artistic works of Raja Ravi Varma and his brother C. Raja Raja Varma.

== Later life ==
Thurston was awarded the Kaisar-i-Hind Medal, first class, on 26 June 1902. He was made C.I.E. in 1909. He retired to England and spent his winters at Penzance where he studied the local plants and regularly hosted a New Year party for the local botanists. He died on 12 October 1935 at Penzance.

== Works ==
- Thurston, Edgar (1888). Coins – Catalogue No. 1: Mysore. Madras: Government Central Museum.
- Thurston, Edgar (1888). Catalogue of the Batrachia, Salientia and Apoda (Frogs, Toads, and Coecilians) of Southern India. Madras: Government Press.
- Thurston, Edgar (1889). Coins – Catalogue No. 3: Sultans of Dehlí. Madras: Government Central Museum.
- Thurston, Edgar (1992) [1890 Madras: Government Central Museum]. History of the coinage of the territories of the East India company in the Indian peninsula and catalogue of the coins in the Madras museum (Reprinted ed.). New Delhi: Asian Educational Services. ISBN 978-81-206-0720-0.
- Thurston, Edgar (1890). Notes on the pearl and chank fisheries and marine fauna of the Gulf of Manaar. Madras: Government Central Museum.
- Thurston, Edgar (1894). Coins – Catalogue No. 2: Roman, Indo-Portuguese, and Ceylon (2nd ed.). Madras: Government Central Museum.
- Thurston, Edgar (1894). "Pearl and Chank Fisberies of the Gulf of Manaar". Bulletin (1). Madras: Madras Government Museum.
- Thurston, Edgar (1896). "Anthropology of the Todas and Kotas of the Nilgiri Hills : and of the Bráhmans, Kammálans, Pallis, and Pariahs of Madras City". Bulletin (4). Madras: Madras Government Museum.
- Thurston, Edgar (2004) [1896 Madras: Government Central Museum]. "Kadirs of Anaimarais – Malaialis of Shevaroys – The Dravidian Head – Dravidian Problem". Bulletin. 2 (3) (Reprinted ed.). New Delhi: Asian Educational Services. ISBN 978-81-206-1859-6.
- Thurston, Edgar (1899). Monograph on the silk fabric industry of the Madras presidency. Madras: Government Press.
- Thurston, Edgar (1900). "Anthropology: Notes on some of the people of Malabar — Mala Vedars of Travancore — Miscellenea". Bulletin. 3 (1). Madras: Madras Government Museum.
- Thurston, Edgar (1901). Monograph on the ivory carving industry of Southern India. Madras: Government Press.
- Thurston, Edgar (1903). "Anthropology: Visions of the Uralis and Sholagars — More Marriage Customs in Southern India — Hook-Swinging — Paliyans". Bulletin. 5 (1). Madras: Madras Government Museum.
- Thurston, Edgar (1906). Ethnographic Notes in Southern India. Madras: Government Press.
- Thurston, Edgar; Rangachari, K. (1909). Castes and Tribes of Southern India. Vol. I (A and B). Madras: Government Press.
- Thurston, Edgar; Rangachari, K. (1909). Castes and Tribes of Southern India. Vol. II (C to J). Madras: Government Press.
- Thurston, Edgar; Rangachari, K. (1909). Castes and Tribes of Southern India. Vol. III (K). Madras: Government Press.
- Thurston, Edgar; Rangachari, K. (1909). Castes and Tribes of Southern India. Vol. IV (K to M). Madras: Government Press.
- Thurston, Edgar; Rangachari, K. (1909). Castes and Tribes of Southern India. Vol. V (M to P). Madras: Government Press.
- Thurston, Edgar; Rangachari, K. (1909). Castes and Tribes of Southern India. Vol. VI (P to S). Madras: Government Press.
- Thurston, Edgar; Rangachari, K. (1909). Castes and Tribes of Southern India. Vol. VII (T to Z). Madras: Government Press.
- Thurston, Edgar (1912). Omens and Superstitions of Southern India. New York: McBride, Nast & Company.
- Thurston, Edgar (2016). OMENS AND SUPERSTITIONS OF SOUTHERN INDIA ( New digital version). Deverkovil: VICTORIA INSTITUTIONS.
- Thurston, Edgar (1913). Holland, T. H. (ed.). The Madras Presidency, with Mysorg, Coorg and the Associated States. Provincial Geographies of India. Vol. 3. Cambridge: University Press.
- Thurston, Edgar; Vigurs, Chambré C. (1922). A Supplement to F. Hamilton Davey's Flora of Cornwall. Truro: Royal Institution of Cornwall.

== See also ==
- Robert Vane Russell
