= Provincial Geographies of India =

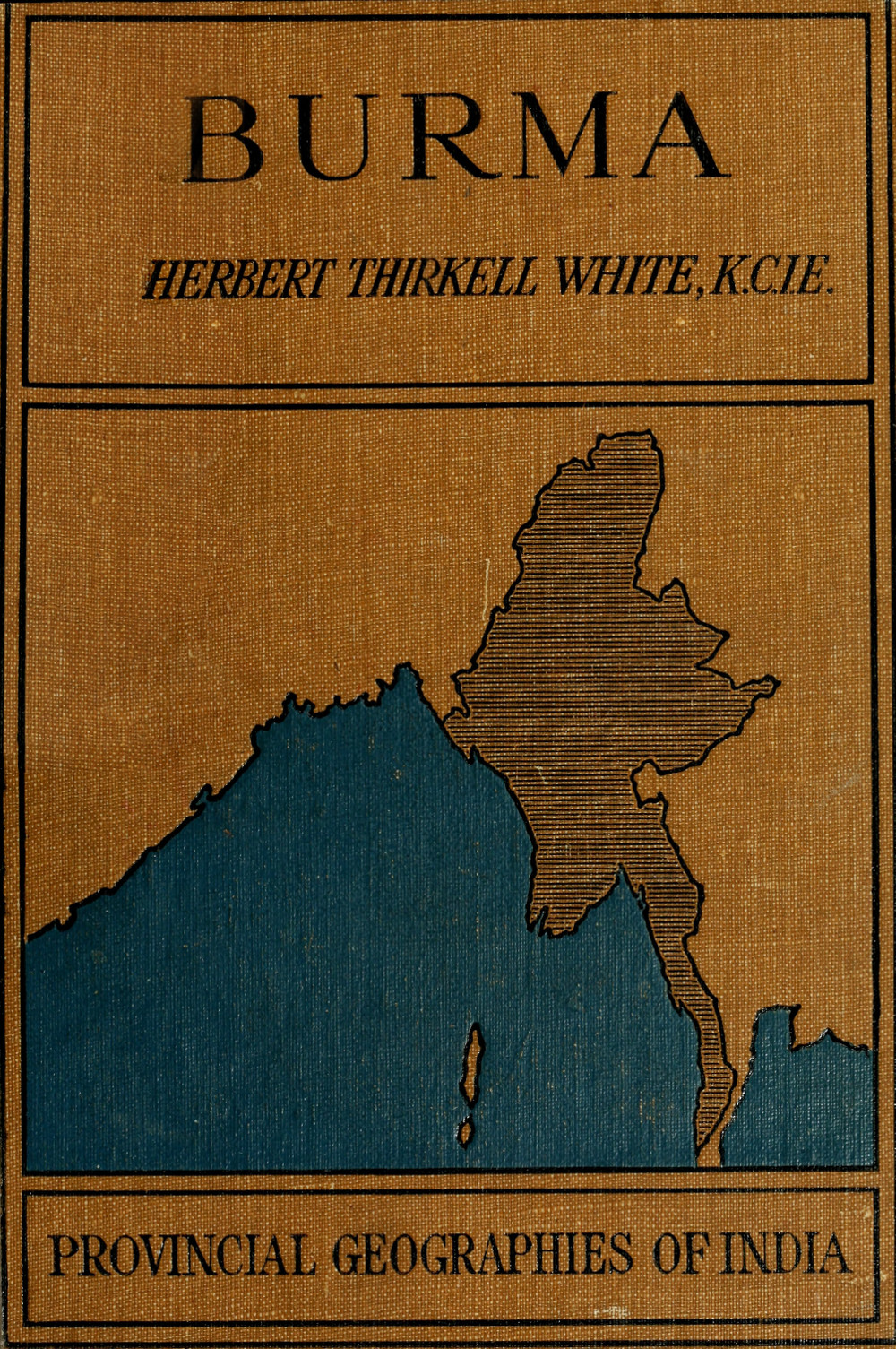
Volume 4

The Provincial Geographies of India was a four-volume book series which was published between 1913-23 by the Cambridge University Press under the editorship of Thomas Henry Holland.

Volume	Year	Author	Title	References
1	1916	James McCrone Douie	The Panjab, Northwest Frontier Province and Kashmir	
2	1917	Lewis Sydney Steward O'Malley	Bengal, Bihar and Orissa, Sikkim	
3	1913	Edgar Thurston	The Madras Presidency, with Mysore Coorg, and the associated States	
4	1923	Herbert Thirkell White	Burma	
