= Edward Douglas MacLagan =

British colonial administrator (1864–1952)

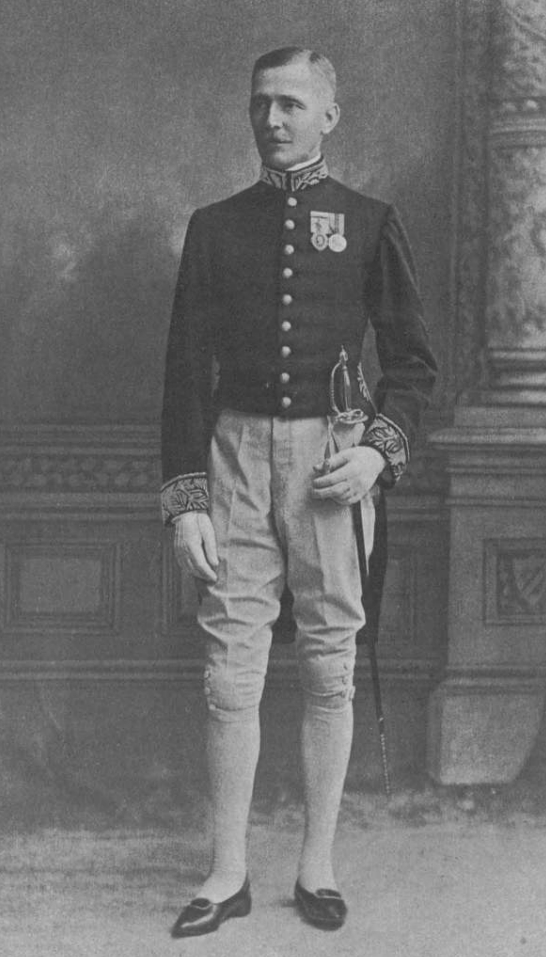

Sir Edward Douglas Maclagan KCSI KCIE (25 August 1864 – 22 October 1952) was an administrator in British India.

He was born in the Punjab, the son of General Maclagan of the Royal Engineers and educated at Winchester College and New College, Oxford. In 1883 he passed the Indian Civil Service Examination.

MacLagan wrote widely on Indian history and superintended the Punjab census of 1891. With Horace Arthur Rose, Superintendent of Ethnography in the Punjab in the early 20th century, he compiled a large work, A Glossary of the Tribes and Castes of the Punjab and North-West Frontier Province, including material from Denzil Ibbetson's 1881 census.

In 1906 he was appointed Chief Secretary to the Government of the Punjab; in 1910 he was appointed Secretary to the Revenue Department of the Indian Government and from 1915 to 1918 served as Secretary to the Education Department. He became Lieutenant-Governor of the Punjab in 1919 and Governor from 1921 to 1924.

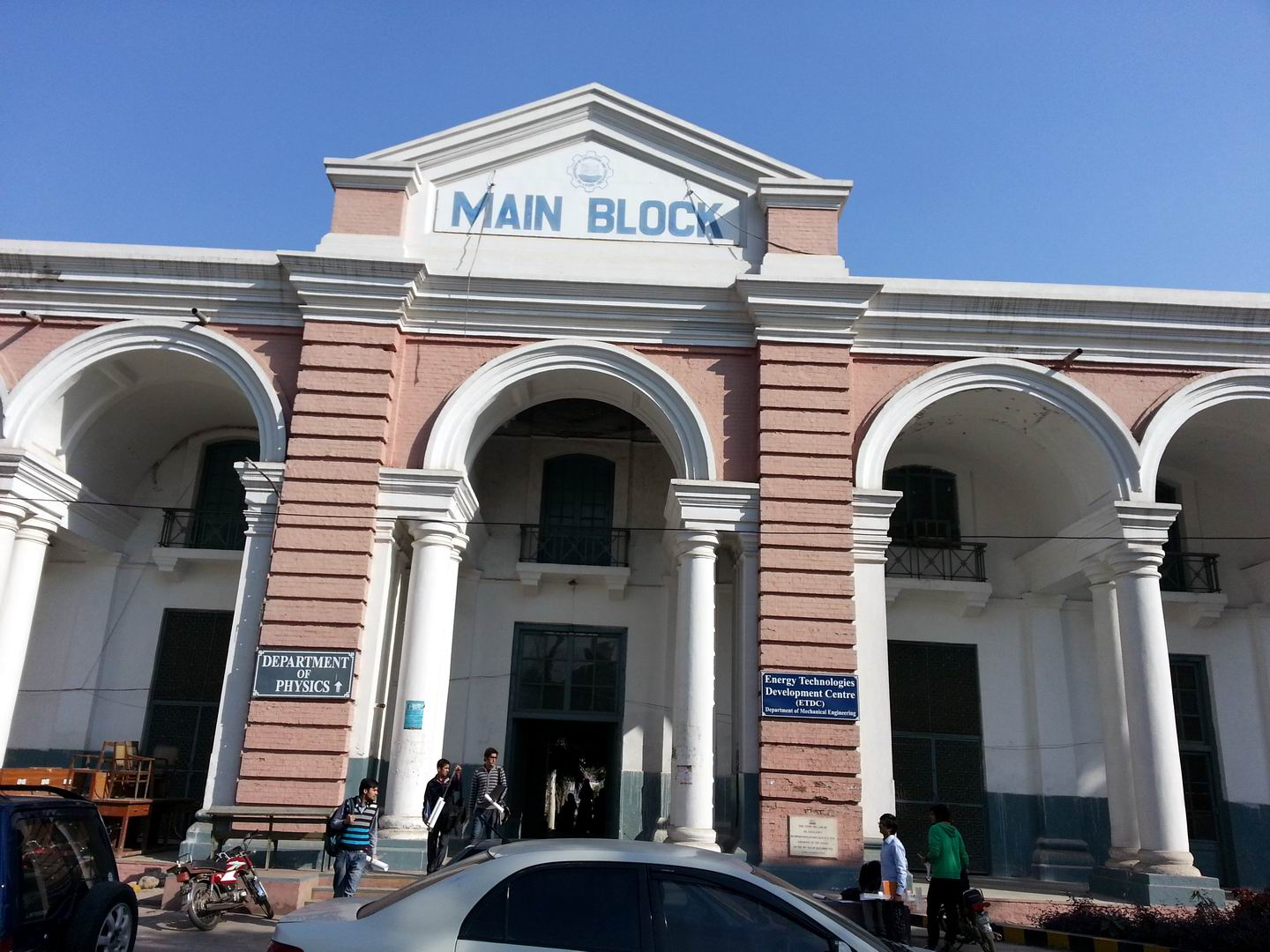
Main Block, University of Engineering and Technology Lahore

He was Chancellor of University of the Punjab from 1919 to 1924. In 1923, in his role as the Governor of the Punjab, he laid the foundation stone for the new main building of Mughalpura Technical College. This was renamed as Maclagan Engineering College and later became the University of Engineering and Technology, Lahore and Punjab Engineering College, Chandigarh. He was awarded Knight Commander of the Order of the Indian Empire (KCIE) and Knight Commander of the Order of the Star of India (KCSI).

He returned to England in 1924 and occupied himself in writing The Jesuits and the Great Mogul. From 1925 to 1928 and from 1931 to 1934 he acted as President of the Royal Asiatic Society of Great Britain and Ireland.

== Works ==
- Monograph on the Gold and Silver Works of the Punjab (1890)
- The Punjab and its feudatories; The report on the census (Census of India, 1891) (1892)
- Gazetteer of the Multan District (1902) editor
- A Glossary of the Tribes and Castes of the Punjab and North-West Frontier (1991) with Denzil Ibbetson and H. A. Rose
- The Jesuits and the Great Mogul (1932)
