= A Walk Along the Ganges =

1986 book by Dennison Berwick

- Front cover
- Author: Dennison Berwick
- Language: English
- Genre: Travelogue
- Publisher: London : Century Hutchinson
- English publication date: 1986
- ISBN: 0091637600
- Dewey Decimal: 915.4/10452

A Walk Along the Ganges (1986) is a travelogue written by Dennison Berwick. In this book, author tells about journey, a 2000 miles along the Ganges, the Indian river.

== Background ==
The idea of walking along the river came to Berwick's mind, when he was "gazing over" Nile. In introduction of the book he wrote, from his childhood he had a wish to come to India and explore the India. Through this 2000 miles journey he attempted to explore the country.

== Content ==
The book was divided into several chapters. He started with giving acknowledgement to those people from who got assistance throughout his journey and an author's note where he discussed how and when the idea of travelling the length of the river struck his mind and how he prepared for it. Then he divided the book in fourteen chapters, in which he narrated different experienced which he gathered during the journey.
