= Subodh Chandra Sengupta =

Indian literature academic (1903–1998)

- Born: 27 June 1903; Banari, Dhaka Bikrampur, Bengal Province, British India
- Died: 3 December 1998 (aged 95); Kolkata West Bengal, India
- Occupations: Academic; Scholar; Writer
- Years active: 1929–1998
- Known for: Shakesperean literature
- Parents: Hemchandra Sengupta (father); Mrinalini Debi (mother)
- Awards: Padma Bhushan

Subodh Chandra Sengupta (27 June 1903 – 3 December 1998) was an Indian scholar, academic and critic of English literature, known for his scholarship on Shakespearean works. His books on William Shakespeare, which included Aspects of Shakespearian Tragedy, Shakespearian Comedy and Shakespeare's Historical Plays are critically acclaimed for scholarship and academic rigor. He was a professor in the Department of English Language and Literature at Presidency College (now Presidency University), Calcutta, and after retirement from Presidency College, became Professor of English Language and Literature at Jadavpur University, Calcutta, as well as a professor of English literature at Ramakrishna Mission Residential College, Narendrapur, an autonomous college in Greater Calcutta under the University of Calcutta. The Government of India awarded him the third highest civilian honour of the Padma Bhushan, in 1983, for his contributions to literature and education.

== Biography ==
Subodh Chandra Sengupta was born in 1903 in Banari in Dhaka Bikrampur, in the Bengal Province of British India (present-day Bangladesh) and after passing Entrance from Banari high school in Bikrampur he did his college studies at Presidency College, Calcutta during 1924-26 where he had the opportunity to learn under such academics as Harendra Coomar Mookerjee, Prafulla Chandra Ghosh and Srikumar Banerjee. After securing his MA in 1927, he continued his doctoral studies with Premchand Roychand Scholarship during which time he started his career as a faculty member at the Presidency College, Calcutta. He served the institution from 1929 till 1960, barring two interludes from 1933 to 1935 and from 1942 to 1946. In between, he secured his PhD in 1934 and also taught at Ramakrishna Mission Residential College for a while.

Sengupta published five books on Shakespeare, The Whirlgig of Time: The Problem of Duration in Shakespeare's Plays (1961), A Shakespeare Manual (1977), Aspects of Shakespearian Tragedy (1972), Shakespearean Comedy (1950), and Shakespeare's Historical Plays (1964), which are known to be reference texts on the English playwright. He also wrote on other literary figures such as George Bernard Shaw (The Art of Bernard Shaw), Rabindranath Tagore (The Great Sentinel: A Study of Rabindranath Tagore), Saratchandra Chatterjee (Saratchandra: Man and Artist) and Bankimchandra Chatterjee (Bankimchandra Chatterjee). His other major works included two original books, Towards a Theory of Imagination, a philosophical treatise, India Wrests Freedom, a historical interpretation of Indian freedom movement, and two translations, Dhvanyaloka, a commentary on aesthetics by Anandavardhana translated into Bengali by Sengupta, and Mahatma Gandhi, As I Saw Him, a critical account of the life of Mohandas KaramChand Gandhi written by Prafulla Chandra Ghosh and translated by Sengupta. He also assisted in the publication of a dictionary, Samsad Bengali-English Dictionary and edited the annual publications of Presidency College Alumni Association.

Sengupta, who was honored by the Government of India with the civilian award of the Padma Bhushan in 1983, died in 1998, at the age of 95. Several writers have recorded their indebtedness to Sengupta in their works. The story of his life has been documented in a work, Professor Subodh Chandra Sen Gupta: Scholar Extraordinary, published by the foundation bearing his name.

== Selected bibliography ==
- Subodh Chandra Sen Gupta (1936). The art of Bernard Shaw. Folcroft Library Editions. ISBN 9780841444393.
- Subodhchandra Sengupta (1 January 1996). Bankimchandra Chatterjee. Sahitya Akademi Publications. ISBN 978-81-260-0001-2.
- Subodh Chandra Sen Gupta (1975). Saratchandra: Man and Artist. Sahitya Akademi.
- S. C. Sengupta (1948). The Great Sentinel: A Study of Rabindranath Tagore. Mukherjee.
- S. C. Sengupta (1950). Shakespearian Comedy. Oxford University Press. p. 287. OCLC 6476690.
- S. C. Sengupta (1959). Towards a Theory of Imagination. Oxford University Press. p. 315. ASIN B0007J1C6U.
- S. C. Sengupta (1961). The whirlgig of Time: The problem of Duration in Shakespeare's Plays. Orient Longmans. p. 201. OCLC 1940902.
- Subodh Chandra SenGupta (1966). Shakespeare's Historical Plays. Oxford University Press. ISBN 9780198116219.
- Prafulla Chandra Ghosh (1968). Mahatma Gandhi: As I Saw Him. Translated by S. C. Sengupta. S. Chand & Company.
- S. C. Sengupta (1972). Aspects of Shakespearian Tragedy. Oxford University Press. p. 176. ISBN 9780195602920. OCLC 832557.
- S. C. Sengupta (1977). A Shakespeare Manual. Oxford University Press. pp. 157. ISBN 9780195609530.
- Subodh Chandra Sen Gupta (1982). India wrests freedom. Sahitya Samsad.
- Sailendra Biswas; Birendramohan Dasgupta; S C Sen Gupta (1982). Samsad Bengali-English dictionary. Calcutta Sahitya Samsad. p. 932. OCLC 9418239.

== See also ==
- Bankimchandra Chatterjee
- Saratchandra Chatterjee
- Prafulla Chandra Ghosh
- George Bernard Shaw
- Rabindranath Tagore
