= K. Rangachari =

Indian ethnologist

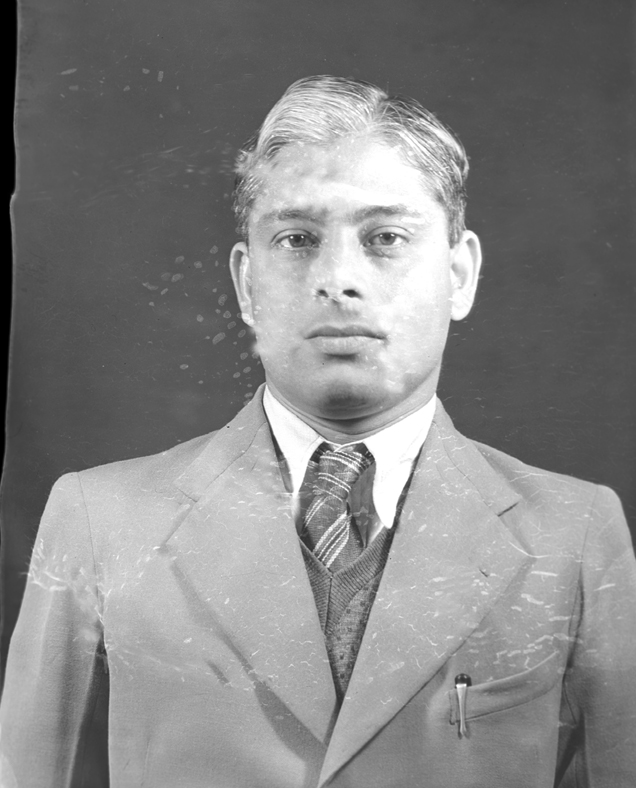
K. Rangachari

Diwan Bahadur Kadambi Rangachari (September 1868– 10 May 1934) was an Indian botanist and ethnologist. He was an editor for the seven-volume work on south Indian ethnography along with Edgar Thurston. He also taught botany at the agricultural college in Coimbatore and wrote a textbook on botany.

== Early life and education ==
He was born in a Tamil family of humble means. His father died early and Rangachari had to earn his living by giving private tuitions. He passed the arts examination at Madras Christian College in 1888 and graduated with a BA from Pachiappa's College in 1890. He then went to the Presidency College for his MA.

== Career ==
He began to teach, working at Anantapur from 1895.

In 1897, he joined the Government Museum as Herbarium Keeper. In 1902, he moved to Presidency College as a senior assistant professor. He served as acting superintendent for ethnography in 1901 and began to be involved in the seven-volume work on the Castes and Tribes of Southern India along with the British museologist Edgar Thurston. In 1909, he became involved in the teaching of systematic botany at the agricultural college in Coimbatore. In 1913 he received the title of Rai Bahadur from the government in recognition of his work. In 1917, he presided over the botanical section of the Indian Science Congress at Bangalore and spoke on the flora of Tirunelveli. He was a founding member of the Indian Botanical Society and served as its president in 1922. He retired from agricultural service in 1923 and was conferred the title of Dewan Bahadur.
