= Horace Arthur Rose =

Administrator in the Indian Civil Service and author (1867-1933)

- Born: 25 November 1867
- Died: 18 September 1933 (aged 65); Saint Brélade, Jersey
- Occupation: Indian Civil Service administrator
- Known for: Ethnography

Horace Arthur Rose (25 November 1867 – 18 September 1933) was an administrator in the Indian Civil Service and also an author of works related to India in the time of the British Raj.

Rose was the son of a merchant from East Grinstead and was born on 25 November 1867. He was educated at St Paul's School and at Emmanuel College, Cambridge, where he arrived from his home in Wallingford, Surrey with the award of a scholarship.

Rose passed the competitive examination for the Indian Civil Service in 1886 and arrived in India on 4 October 1888. Initially posted as an Assistant Commissioner in the Punjab, he was appointed Deputy Commissioner in March 1898 and in 1902 became Superintendent of the Gazetteer revision. He was Superintendent for the Punjab census in 1901 and from then until 1906 was also Superintendent of Ethnography for that province. From 1906 to 1913 he was a District Judge in the court of District and Sessions of the Punjab, and from then was appointed Judge. He was appointed the rank of Honorary Lieutenant-Colonel in the Indian Army during World War I.

Rose retired from the Indian Civil Service in 1918 and died at Saint Brélade, Jersey on 18 September 1933.

== Publications ==
- Rose, Horace Arthur; Gupte, B. A. (1902). Notes on Female Tattoo Designs in India.
- Rose, Horace Arthur (1905). Customs in the Trans-Border Territories of the North-West Frontier Province. Asiatic Society.
- Rose, Horace Arthur; Shafi, M. Muhammed (1911). A Compendium of the Punjab Customary Law. Lahore: Samuel T. Weston at the Civil and Military Gazette Press.
- Rose, Horace Arthur; MacLagan, Edward Douglas. A Glossary of the Tribes and Castes of the Punjab and North-West Frontier Province. Lahore: Samuel T. Weston at the Civil and Military Gazette Press.
  - Volume 1 (1911)
  - Volume 2 (1911)
  - Volume 3 (1919)
- Brown, John Porter (1927). Rose, Horace Arthur (ed.). The Darvishes: or, Oriental Spiritualism (2nd ed.). Cass.

== See also ==
- William Crooke
- Edward Albert Gait
- William Wilson Hunter
- H. H. Risley
- Robert Vane Russell
- Edgar Thurston
