= Thomas Henry Holland =

British geologist

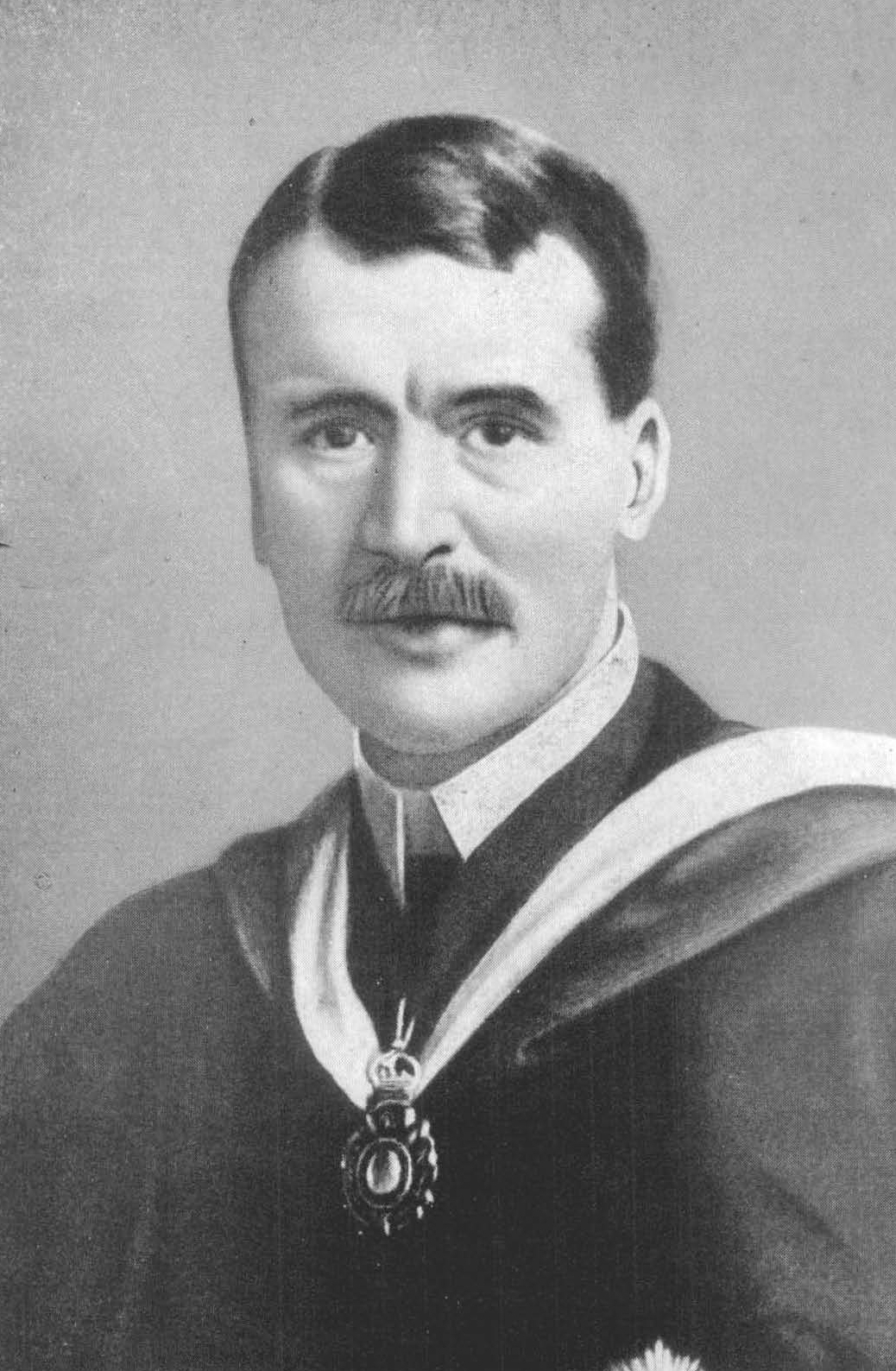
- Born: 22 November 1868; Helston, Cornwall, England
- Died: 15 May 1947 (aged 78)
- Education: Royal College of Science; Owens College
- Occupations: Geologist, university administrator

Sir Thomas Henry Holland KCSI KCIE FRS FRSE (22 November 1868 – 15 May 1947) was a British geologist who worked in India with the Geological Survey of India, serving as its director from 1903 to 1910. He later worked as an educational administrator - and was Principal 1929-1944 - at Edinburgh University.

== Early life ==
Thomas Holland was born on 22 November 1868 in Helston, Cornwall, to John Holland and Grace Treloar Roberts who later emigrated to Canada to live in a farm in Springfield, Manitoba.

In 1884, Thomas won a scholarship to study at the Royal College of Science, graduating with a first class degree in Geology. The dean at the Royal College of Science, Thomas Henry Huxley, made a great impression on Holland. He stayed on as an assistant to Professor John Wesley Judd and was awarded a Berkeley Fellowship at Owens College, Manchester, in 1889.

== Career ==
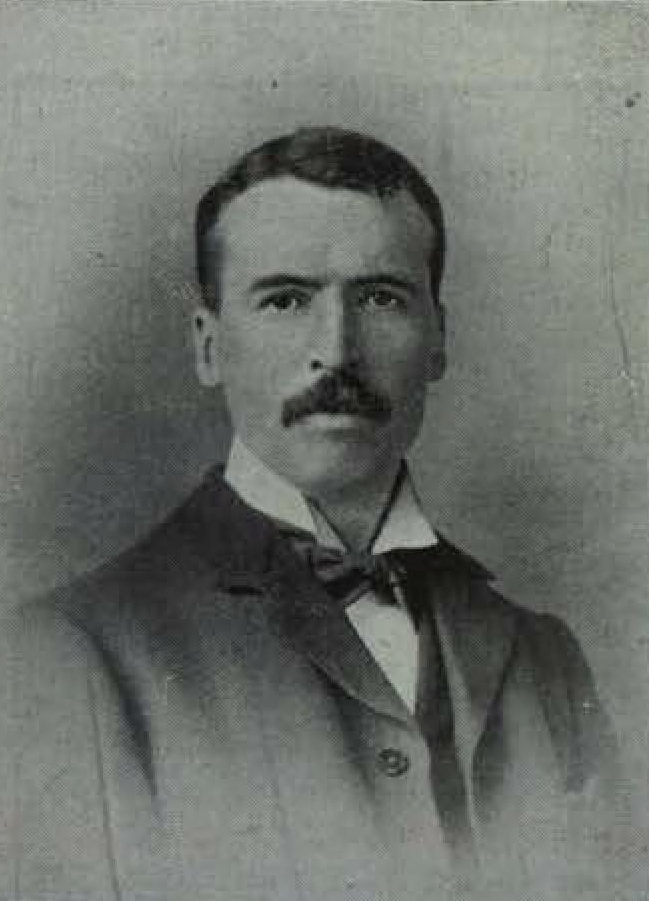
c. 1907

In 1890, Holland was appointed Assistant Superintendent of the Geological Survey of India and curator of the Geological Museum and Laboratory. In 1903, he was appointed Director of the Geological Survey of India and in 1904 he was elected to be a Fellow of the Royal Society. Holland produced the first scientific description of what he named as charnockite from Job Charnock's tombstone located in St John's Church compound in Calcutta which had been brought from somewhere in Madras. Holland continued work on the gneisses of southern India that had earlier been classified by William King and Robert Bruce Foote. Holland reclassified the hypersthene granites as acidic (the charnockites, with the type being from St Thomas Mount), the intermediate, basic, and ultrabasic. In 1908, he was appointed a Knight Commander of the Order of the Indian Empire (KCIE) for his services to the Geological Survey of India. He returned to Britain in 1910. That year he delivered the Wilde lecture, Titled "Recent Contributions to Theories regarding the Internal Structure of the Earth" to the Manchester Literary & Philosophical Society.

In 1912 he was appointed to the Royal Commission on Fuel and Engines. He served the Government of India as the President of the Indian Munitions Board from 1916-1919. He was president of the British Association in 1928–1929.

Under the editorship of Holland a four volume "Provincial Geographies of India" series was published between 1913 and 1923 from the Cambridge University Press.

Holland was Rector of Imperial College London from 1922 to 1929 and Principal of the University of Edinburgh from 1929 to 1944. The Albert Medal of the Royal Society of Arts for 1939 was awarded to Sir Thomas H. Holland, "for his services to the mineral industries". He was also a member of the Royal Cornwall Polytechnic Society.

From 1929 until 1944 he was Principal of Edinburgh University. In 1930 he was elected a Fellow of the Royal Society of Edinburgh. His proposers were Sir James Alfred Ewing, Sir Edward Albert Sharpey-Schafer, Ralph Allan Sampson and James Hartley Ashworth. He served as the Society's Vice-President from 1932 to 1935. He served as President of the Geographical Association in 1937–1938. He won the Society's Bruce Preller Prize for 1941.

== Death ==
Holland died unexpectedly at his home in Surbiton on 15 May 1947.

== Family ==
He married twice: firstly in 1896 to Frances Maud Chapman (d.1942); secondly in 1946, aged 78, to Helen Ethleen Verrall.

Academic offices
Preceded by Alfred Keogh	Rector of Imperial College London; 1922–1929	Succeeded by Henry Tizard
Preceded by Sir Alfred James Ewing	Principal of the University of Edinburgh; 1929–1944	Succeeded by Sir John Fraser
