= Faculty of Divinity, University of Cambridge =

Divinity school of the University of Cambridge

Coordinates: 52.2019°N 0.1080°E

Faculty of divinity
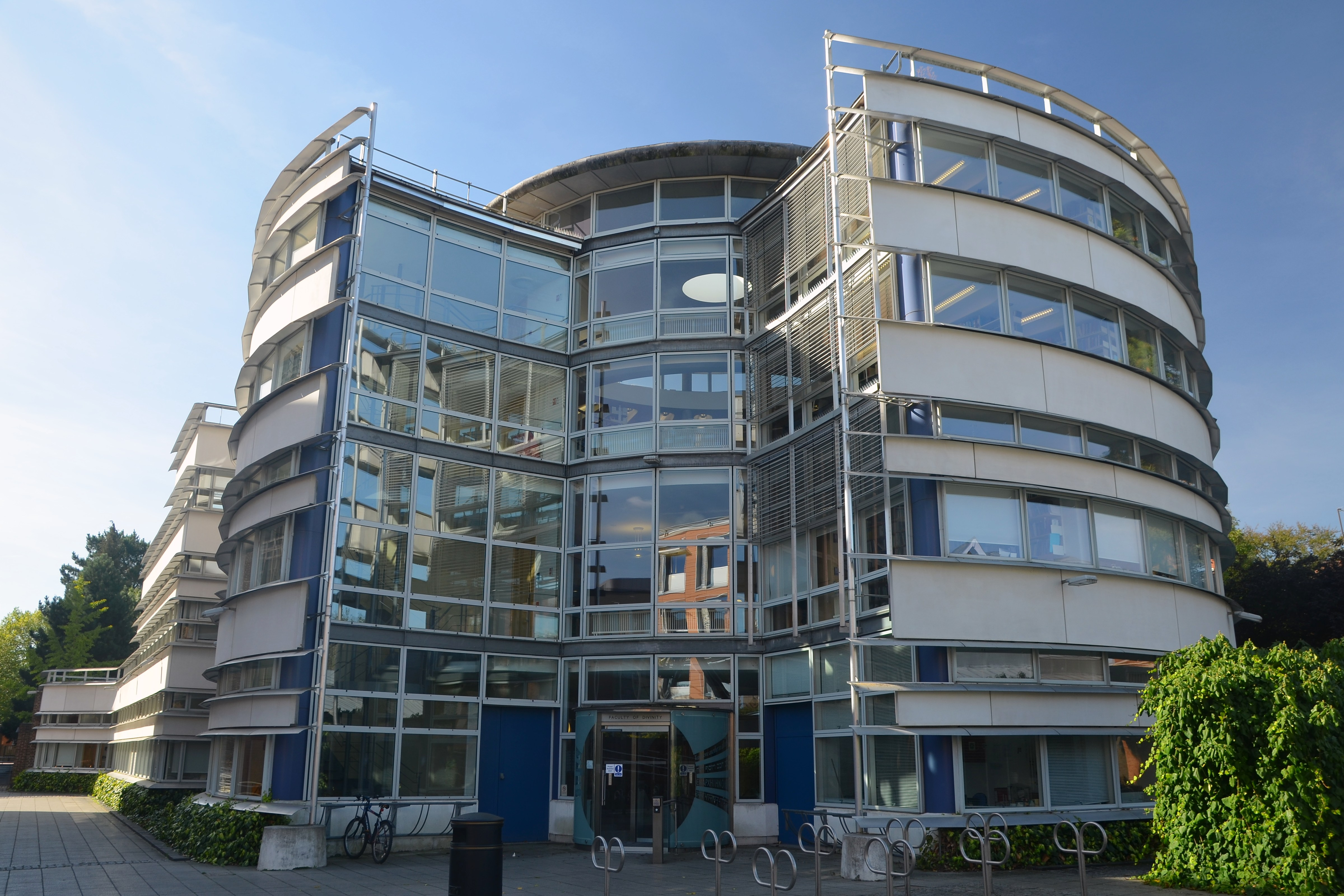
- Faculty of divinity building on the Sidgwick site
- Type: Divinity
- Established: Mid 13th century (original teaching); 6 December 1854 (current)
- Parent institution: University of Cambridge
- Location: Cambridge, England
- Website: www.divinity.cam.ac.uk

The faculty of divinity is the divinity school of the University of Cambridge. It is based at university's Sidgwick site, which also houses the faculty library. Theology or divinity was taught at the university from shortly after its founding in the 13th century but atrophied in the 17th and 18th centuries. The current faculty was established in the mid 19th century when teaching of theology was restarted.

== History ==
The north range of the Old Schools, built as the divinity school and Regent House in 1400

Teaching of divinity was established at the University of Cambridge by the mid 13th century. The first professorship instituted at the university, the Lady Margaret's Professor of Divinity, was dedicated to the subject, in 1502. Similarly, the next professorships to be established at the university – the Regius chairs, of 1540 – included the Regius Professor of Divinity.

Following the Reformation, college teaching grew in importance and although professorial teaching continued through the mid-17th century it was essentially replaced by college lecturers and tutorials – which concentrated on the undergraduate arts curriculum – in the 18th century. By the time Charles Simeon became vicar of Holy Trinity in 1782, there was no official teaching of theology at the university. He introduced "conversation parties" discussing spiritual subjects and gave courses on sermon composition.

In the 1820s, Christopher Wordsworth proposed the introduction of honours exams in classics and theology, but only the exam classics was instituted. This was followed in 1841 by George Peacock proposing the establishment of professional courses in the classical higher facilities of law, medicine and theology in his Observations on the Statutes of the University of Cambridge. In 1842 a voluntary post-BA examination in theology was introduced, which became required for ordination by most bishops. No teaching was provided until 1848, when candidates were required to attend one term of divinity lectures. Although recommended by the royal commission of 1852, honours examinations in theology were not held until 1874, replacing the voluntary examination that was last held in 1873. Divinity degrees were opened to non-Anglicans in 1914, occasioning debate in the House of Lords.

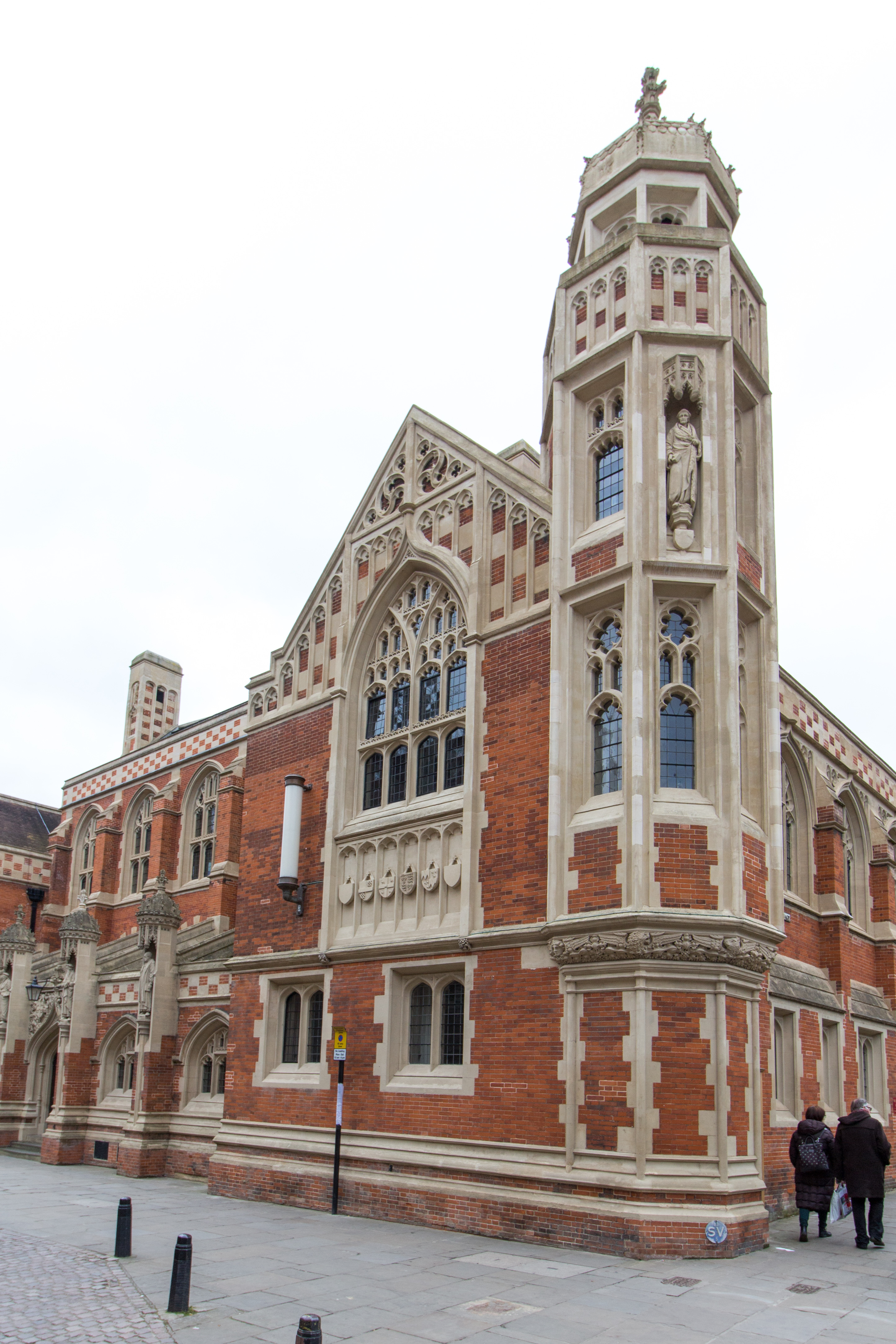
The Selwyn Divinity School, 1879, now part of St John's College

Following the recommendations of the royal commission, the board of theological studies was formally created by a grace of 6 December 1854. This was reorganised in 1861 under the 1860 statute for the appointment of boards of studies. Following the commission of 1877, the statutes of 1882 transformed this into the special board of studies for divinity. Following another royal commission and the Universities of Oxford and Cambridge Act 1923, this became the faculty of divinity in 1926.

Beginning in 1879, the school of divinity was housed in the Selwyn Divinity School, constructed by Basil Champneys. Now known as the Old Divinity School, the building belongs to St John's College. Since 2001, the faculty has been situated on the university's Sidgwick site, in the west of the city.

== Academic profile ==
=== Courses ===
The faculty offers an undergraduate degree in theology, religion and philosophy of religion, as well as a taught master's degree and PhDs. The faculty also offers a Bachelor of Theology for ordinands in partnership with the Cambridge Theological Federation.

=== Professorships ===
The established chairs in the faculty of divinity include the Lady Margaret's Professor of Divinity (1502), the Regius Professor of Divinity (1540), and the Norris-Hulse Professor of Divinity (1934, from the Norrisian Professor (1780) and the Hulsean Professor (1860)). The Ely Professor of Divinity was established in 1889 and lapsed in 1980.

=== Reputation and rankings ===
Rankings
National rankings
- Complete (2027): 3
- Guardian (2027): 3

Global rankings
- QS (2027): 7

In the QS World University Rankings by Subject 2026, Cambridge was ranked seventh globally for theology, divinity and religious studies. Nationally, the faculty was ranked third by the Complete University Guide 2027 and by The Guardian University Guide 2026.

== Notable senior members ==
The following are notable past and present senior members of the faculty of divinity.

=== Past ===
- John Arrowsmith
- Peter Baro
- Joseph Beaumont
- Robert Beaumont
- Richard Bentley
- James Bethune-Baker
- John James Blunt
- Zachary Brooke
- Edward Harold Browne
- Martin Bucer
- William Buckmaster
- George Bullock
- Francis Crawford Burkitt
- John Burnaby
- Thomas Jackson Calvert
- Thomas Cartwright
- William Chaderton
- Henry Chadwick
- Eamon Duffy
- Frederick Henry Chase
- Sarah Coakley
- Samuel Collins
- George Elwes Corrie
- C. H. Dodd
- Charles John Ellicott
- Desiderius Erasmus
- James Fawcett
- John Fisher
- David Ford
- Wiliam Glyn
- Humphrey Gower
- John Green
- Peter Gunning
- John Hey
- Richard Holdsworth
- John Banks Hollingworth
- Morna D. Hooker
- Fenton John Anthony Hort
- Matthew Hutton
- William Ralph Inge
- Robert Jenkin
- James Amiraux Jeremie
- John Kaye
- Alexander Francis Kirkpatrick
- G. H. Lampe
- Nicholas Lash
- Judith Lieu
- Joseph Barber Lightfoot
- Richard Love
- Joseph Rawson Lumby
- Donald MacKinnon
- John Madew
- John Mainwaring
- Fred Shipley Marsh
- Herbert Marsh
- Arthur James Mason
- Charles F. D. Moule
- Handley Carr Glyn Moule
- Alexander Nairne
- Dennis Eric Nineham
- Alfred Ollivant
- John Overall
- John Pearson
- John James Stewart Perowne
- James Pilkington
- Leonard Pilkington
- Thomas Playfere
- Arthur Michael Ramsey
- Michael Ramsey
- John Randolph
- Edward Craddock Ratcliffe
- Charles Earle Raven
- John Redman (professor)
- John Richardson
- Nicholas Ridley
- Joseph Armitage Robinson
- J. A. T. Robinson
- Thomas Rutherforth
- Herbert Edward Ryle
- Thomas Sedgwick
- William Selwyn
- Janet Soskice
- Graham N. Stanton
- Vincent Henry Stanton
- Christopher Stead
- John Still
- Charles Anthony Swainson
- Henry Barclay Swete
- Stephen Sykes
- William Telfer
- Anthony Tuckney
- Denys Alan Turner
- Thomas Turton
- Samuel Ward
- Richard Watson
- William Whitaker
- John Whitgift
- Ralph Widdrington
- Brooke Foss Westcott
- John Young

=== Present ===
Current notable staff include:

- Douglas Hedley
- George van Kooten
- Nathan MacDonald
- Catherine Pickstock
- Krish Raval
- Richard Rex
- Timothy Winter

== Bibliography ==
David M. Thompson, Cambridge Theology in the Nineteenth Century: Enquiry, Controversy and Truth (London: Ashgate, 2008).
