= Charles Calvert (Cambridge University cricketer) =

English cricketer

Personal information
- Full name: Charles Thomas Calvert
- Born: 12 June 1825; London, England
- Died: 9 April 1882 (aged 56); Brislington House, Somerset, England
- Relatives: Thomas Calvert (father)

Domestic team information
- Years: Team
- 1848: Cambridge University
- 1849: MCC
- FC debut: 18 May 1848 Cambridge Univ. v MCC
- Last FC: 14 June 1849 MCC v Cambridge Univ.

Career statistics
Competition	First-class
Matches	5
Runs scored	47
Batting average	6.71
100s/50s	0/0
Top score	18*
Catches/stumpings	0/–
- Source: Cricinfo, 15 April 2017

Charles Thomas Calvert (12 June 1825 – 9 April 1882) was an English lawyer and cricketer.

Calvert was born in London in 1825, the oldest son of Juliana (née Watson) and Thomas Calvert. His father, who had been born Thomas Jackson, was Warden of Manchester Collegiate Church and had been the Norris–Hulse Professor of Divinity at the University of Cambridge. Educated at Shrewsbury School, Calvert captained the school cricket team from 1842 to 1844 before going up to St John's College, Cambridge.

Whilst at Cambridge, Calvert played cricket for a variety of university teams, including his college. He played in five first-class cricket matches. In 1848 he played four matches for Cambridge University Cricket Club, winning a Blue and scoring 43 runs, generally playing as an opening batsman. His two best scores, of 18 not out and 14 came against the Gentlemen of Kent during Canterbury Cricket Week. The following year he played for MCC against the university team, recording a duck and scoring four runs in his final first-class fixture.

After graduating from Cambridge in 1848, Calvert entered Lincoln's Inn to train as a barrister. He was called to the bar in 1851 and played some cricket for MCC, Newmarket Cricket Club, and for the Cambridge Town Club during the 1850s.

Calvert died in 1882 at Brislington House, a private lunatic asylum in Somerset. He was aged 56.
