= William Bullock =

William Bullock may refer to:

- William Bullock (chamberlain) (died c. 1343), Scottish noble
- William Bullock (actor) (c. 1657–c. 1740), English actor
- William Bullock (collector) (c. 1773–1849), English traveller, artist, naturalist and antiquarian
- William Bullock (cricketer) (1837–1904), English cricketer and journalist
- William Bullock (inventor) (1813–1867), American inventor
- William Henry Bullock (1927–2011), American Roman Catholic churchman
- William Stephen Bullock (1865–1936), Canadian Baptist minister, businessman, and politician
- William Thomas Bullock (1818–1879), English Anglican cleric and mission administrator

== Fictional ==
- William Bullock, a character in the TV series Deadwood

== See also ==
- William Bullock Clark (1860–1917), American geologist
- William Bullock Ives (1841–1899), Canadian politician
- William Bellinger Bulloch (1777–1852), American senator
