= Lectionary 216 =

Lectionary ℓ 216
- New Testament manuscript
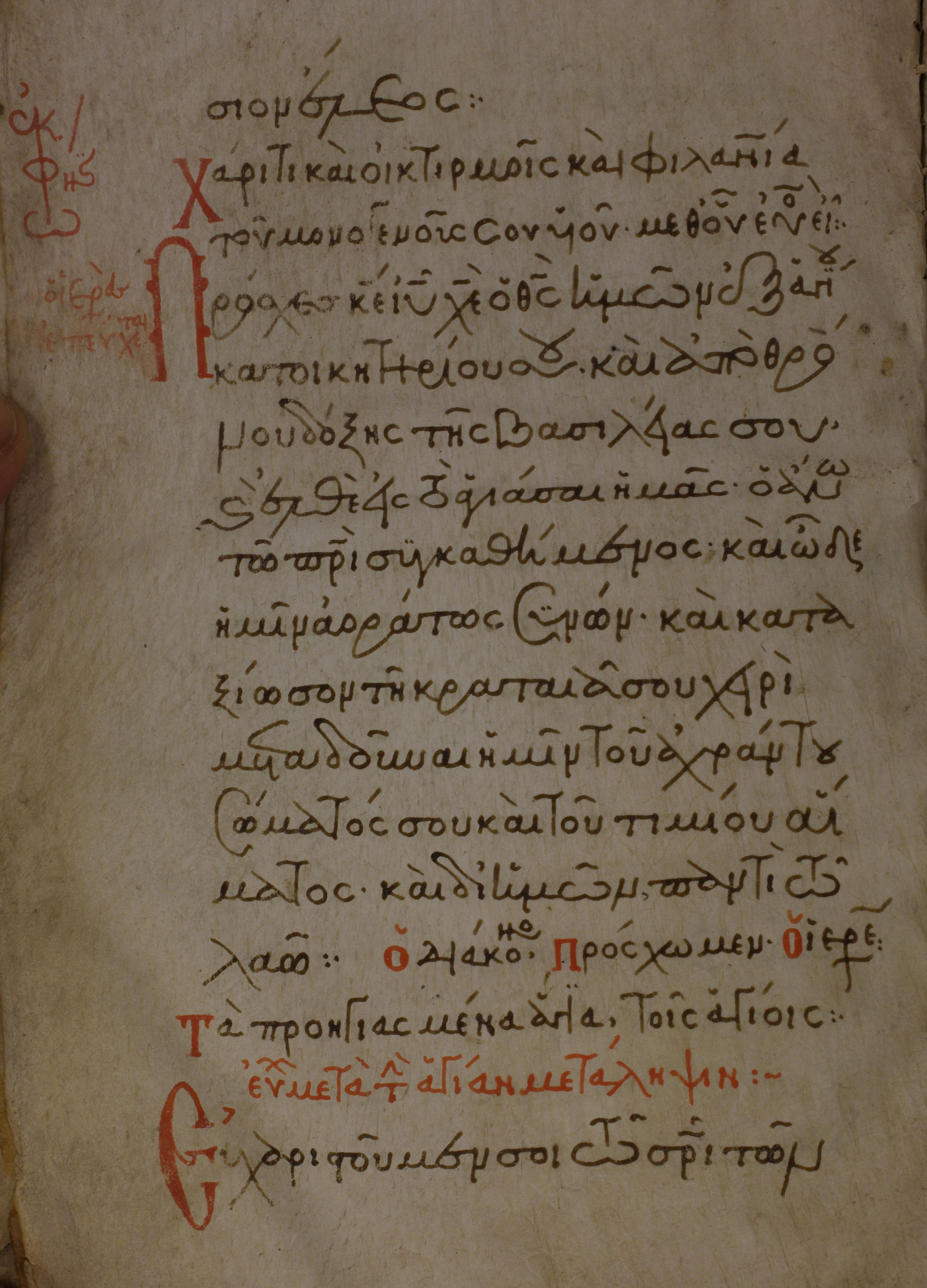
- Folio 54 verso
- Text: Evangelistarium, Apostolarium
- Date: 13th century
- Script: Greek
- Now at: University of Michigan
- Size: 17.8 cm by 12 cm

Lectionary 216, designated by siglum ℓ 216 (in the Gregory-Aland numbering) is a Greek manuscript of the New Testament, on parchment. Palaeographically it has been assigned to the 13th century. Scrivener labelled it by 251^{evl} and 64^{apost}.

== Description ==
The codex contains 19 lessons from the Gospels, Acts, and Epistles lectionary (Evangelistarium, Apostolarium), on 60 parchment leaves (17.8 cm by 12 cm), with some lacunae. The text is written in Greek minuscule letters, in one column per page, 17 lines per page.

It contains the liturgies of Chrysostom, of Basil, and of the Presanctified Gifts (the same ones as Lectionary 223). It has some pictures and decorations. At the foot of folio 57 verso is a fair picture of an angel with golden glory.

No iota adscriptum or iota subscriptum is found. There is no very special critical value in the readings.

== History ==
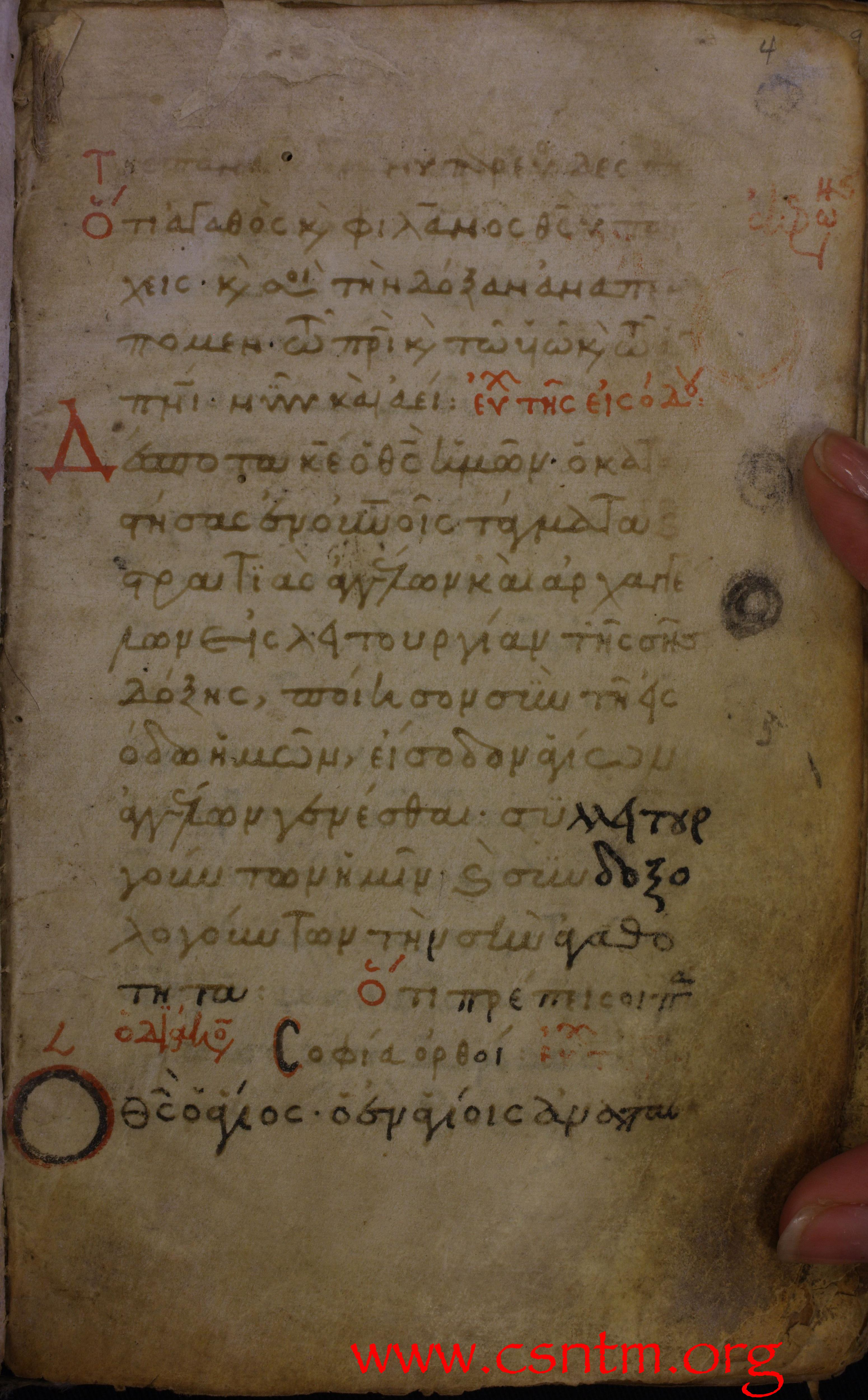
Folio 4 recto

Scrivener dated the manuscript to the 12th or 13th century, Gregory to the 12th century. It has been assigned by the Institute for New Testament Textual Research (INTF) to the 13th century. The name of the scribe is unknown.

Of the history of the codex nothing is known until 1864, when it was in the possession of a dealer at Janina in Epeiros. It was then purchased from him by a representative of Baroness Burdett-Coutts (1814–1906), a philanthropist, along with other Greek manuscripts. They were transported to England in 1870-1871. The manuscript was presented by Burdett-Coutts to Sir Roger Cholmely's School, and was housed at the Highgate (Burdett-Coutts I. 10), in London.

The manuscript was added to the list of New Testament manuscripts by Scrivener (number 251) and Gregory (number 216). Gregory saw it in 1883. It was used by Charles Anthony Swainson for his treatise on the Greek Liturgies (Introduction (1884), p. XXI).

In 1922 it was acquired for the University of Michigan.

The manuscript is not cited in the critical editions of the Greek New Testament (UBS3).

The codex is housed at the University of Michigan (Ms. 49) in Ann Arbor, Michigan.

== See also ==
- List of New Testament lectionaries
- Biblical manuscript
- Textual criticism

== Bibliography ==
- Frederick Henry Ambrose Scrivener, Adversaria Critica Sacra: With a Short Explanatory Introduction (Cambridge, 1893), pp. LXVI-LXVII (as u)
- Kenneth W. Clark, A Descriptive Catalogue of Greek New Testament Manuscripts in America (Chicago, 1937), p. 317.
