= Frederic Charles Cook =

British linguist (1804–1889)

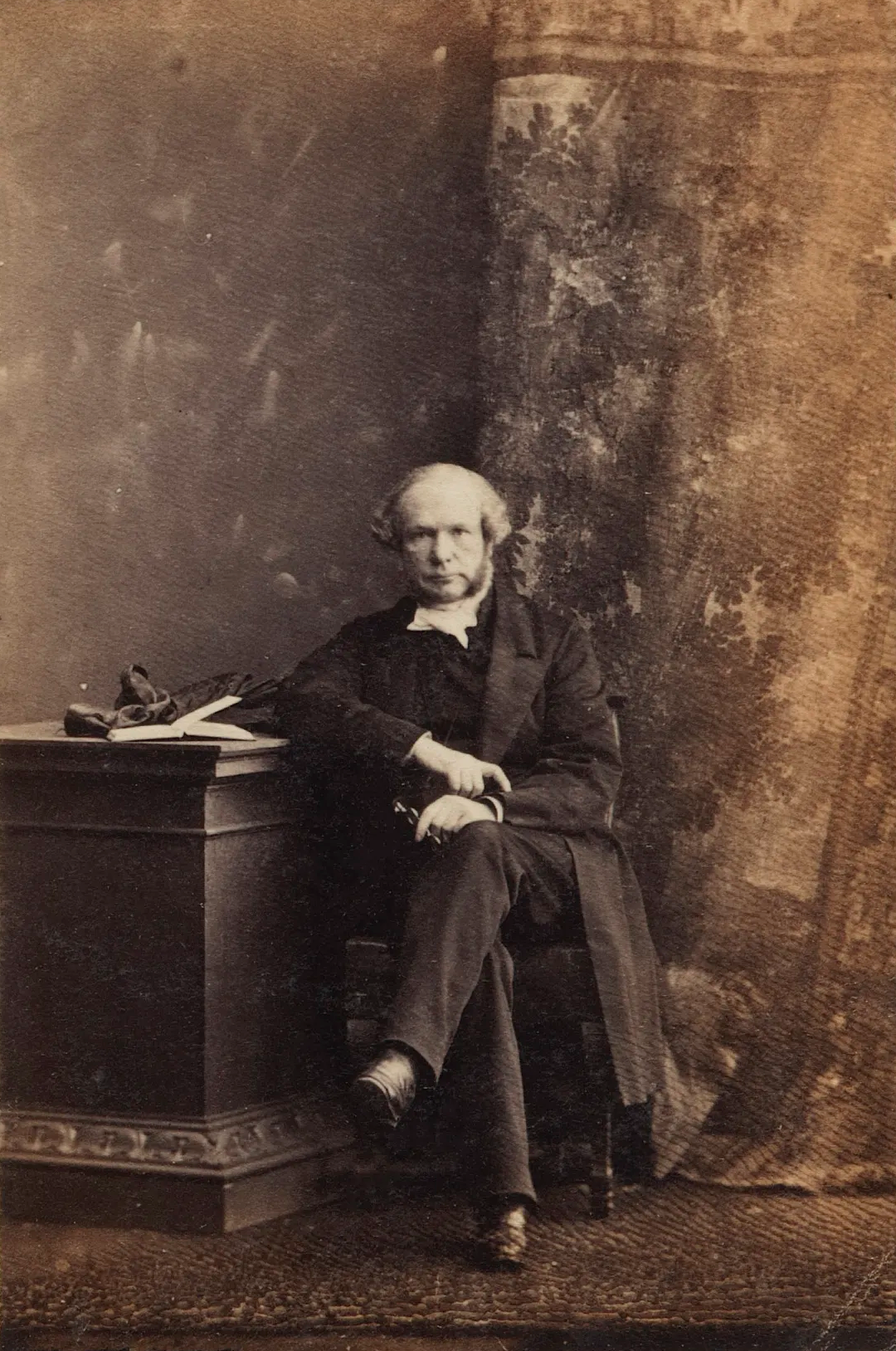
Portrait by Camille Silvy, 1861

Frederic Charles Cook (1 December 1804– 22 June 1889) was an English churchman, known as a linguist and the editor of the Speaker's Commentary on the Bible.

== Life ==
Born at Millbrook, Hampshire, and later moved to Berkshire, he was admitted as a sizar of St John's College, Cambridge, 8 July 1824, graduated B.A. with a first class in the classical tripos in 1831, and M.A. in 1844. After leaving Cambridge he studied for a while under Barthold Georg Niebuhr at the University of Bonn. He was ordained by Charles James Blomfield in 1839, and a few years later was made her majesty's inspector of church schools.

In 1857 Cook was appointed chaplain-in-ordinary to the queen, in 1860 he became preacher at Lincoln's Inn, in 1864 canon-residentiary at Exeter Cathedral (replacing Harold Browne), and in 1869 chaplain to the bishop of London.

Cook was made precentor of Exeter Cathedral in 1872. He resigned his preachership at Lincoln's Inn in 1880. He was an invalid during the last years of his life, and died at Exeter on 22 June 1889. He left his library to the cathedral chapter.

== Works ==
Cook issued in 1849 his Poetry for Schools. Around 1864, when the liberal theology of the Essays and Reviews and John Colenso was prominent, John Evelyn Denison suggested the Church of England reply with biblical apologetics. A commission was formed, after consultation with the bishops, which divided the Bible into eight sections, and for each section chose scholars to provide commentary. The editorship of the whole work (10 volumes), which became known as The Speaker's Commentary, was given to Cook, and it appeared 1871 to 1882.

The Apocrypha were treated separately under the editorship of Henry Wace in 1888. The Commentary came under attack: the portions by Harold Browne on the Pentateuch were criticised by Colenso, Abraham Kuenen, and others.

Volume	Year	Contents
I part I Genesis-Exodus	1871	The Pentateuch and Genesis by Edward Harold Browne, Exodus by Cook, (Egyptian Words by Charles Wycliffe Goodwin is given as one of two essays by Cook)
I part II Leviticus-Deuteronomy	1871	Leviticus by Samuel Clark, Numbers (Thomas Espinell Espin from work of Joseph Francis Thrupp), Deuteronomy by Espin
II Joshua-I Kings	1872	Joshua by T. E. Espin, Judges, Ruth and I and II Samuel, I Kings by George Rawlinson
III II Kings-Esther	1875	II Kings; I and II Chronicles, Ezra, Nehemiah and Esther by George Rawlinson
IV Job-The Song of Solomon	1875	Job by Cook, Psalms by Cook, Charles John Elliott and George Henry Sacheverell Johnson, Proverbs by Edward Hayes Plumptre, Ecclesiastes by William Thomas Bullock, Song of Solomon by Thomas Luck Kingsbury
V Isaiah-Lamentations	1875	Isaiah by William Kay, Jeremiah and Lamentations by Robert Payne Smith
VI Ezekiel, Daniel and the minor prophets	1876	Ezekiel by George Currey, Daniel by Henry John Rose and John Mee Fuller, Hosea by E. Huxtable, Joel by Frederick Meyrick, Amos by Robert Gandell, Obadiah by Meyrick, Jonah by Huxtable, Micah by Samuel Clark, Nahum by Gandell, Habakkuk by Cook, Zephaniah by Gandell, Haggai by W. Drake, Zechariah by Drake
New Testament		
I St Matthew-St Luke	1878	The Gospels by William Thomson, Matthew by Henry Longueville Mansel, Mark by Cook, Luke by Basil Jones and Cook
II St John. The Acts of the Apostles	1880	John by Brooke Foss Westcott, Acts of the Apostles by William Jacobson
III Romans-Philemon	1881	Romans by Edwin Hamilton Gifford, I Corinthians by Thomas Saunders Evans, II Corinthians by Joseph Waite, Galatians by John Saul Howson, Ephesians by F. Meyrick, Philippians by John Gwynn, Colossians and I and II Thessalonians by William Alexander, Timothy and Titus by Wace and John Jackson, Philemon by Alexander
IV Hebrews-The Revelation of St John	1881	Hebrews by William Kay, James by Robert Scott, I Peter by Cook, II Peter by Joseph Rawson Lumby, I, II and III John by Alexander, Jude by Lumby, Revelation by William Lee
Apocrypha		
I Esdras-Wisdom	1888	Introduction by George Salmon, I and II Esdras by Joseph Hirst Lupton, Tobit by J. M. Fuller, Judith by Charles James Ball, Rest of Esther by Fuller, Wisdom by Frederic William Farrar
II Ecclesiasticus-Bel and the Dragon	1888	Ecclesiasticus by Alfred Edersheim, Baruch and Jeremy by E. H. Gifford, Song of the Three Holy Children, History of Susanna and Bel and the Dragon by C. J. Ball

John Mee Fuller edited a Student's Commentary (1884) based on the work.

Cook himself was a critic of the revised New Testament, in The Revised Version of the First Three Gospels (1882). In The Origins of Religion and Language (1884), he upheld the original unity of speech. He is said to have been acquainted with 52 languages.

== Family ==
Cook married on 2 June 1846 at St Nicholas Church, Brighton, to Jessie Barbara, daughter of Alexander Douglas McKenzie of Bursledon, Hampshire, but left no issue.

He was a brother-in-law to the Rev. Robert Montgomery and uncle to Jessie Montgomery.

Cook died at Exeter on the 22 June 1889.

His widow died at Exeter on 5 October 1889.

== Notes ==
Attribution

This article incorporates text from a publication now in the public domain: Lee, Sidney, ed. (1901). "Cook, Frederic Charles". Dictionary of National Biography (1st supplement). London: Smith, Elder & Co.
