= Douglas Hedley =

British philosopher

- Education: LMU Munich (PhD)
- Occupation: Professor of the Philosophy of Religion
- Employer: University of Cambridge
- Known for: Philosophy of Religion, Appearance on Cunk on Earth and Cunk on Life, Appearance on Jordan Peterson's The Gospels
- Notable work: Living Forms of the Imagination, Sacrifice Imagined: Violence, Atonement and the Sacred, The Iconic Imagination
- Title: Professor of the Philosophy of Religion

Douglas Hedley is a British academic who is professor of the Philosophy of Religion at the University of Cambridge and a member of the Faculty of Divinity.

== Public appearances ==
Hedley appeared in the mockumentary series Cunk on Earth and was also one of the eight conversation partners (including bishop Robert Barron, Jonathan Pageau, and others) in Jordan Peterson's "The Gospels" discourses.

== Bibliography ==
Hedley's publications include Living Forms of the Imagination, Sacrifice Imagined: Violence, Atonement and the Sacred, and The Iconic Imagination. Hedley's work encompasses the philosophy of religion, Platonism, Neoplatonism, and the role of imagination in philosophical and religious thought.

== Selected works ==
- Living Forms of the Imagination (2008)
- Sacrifice Imagined (2012)
- The Iconic Imagination (2016)
