= James Henry Monk =

English divine and classical scholar (1784–1856)

The Right Reverend James Henry Monk
- Bishop of Gloucester and Bristol
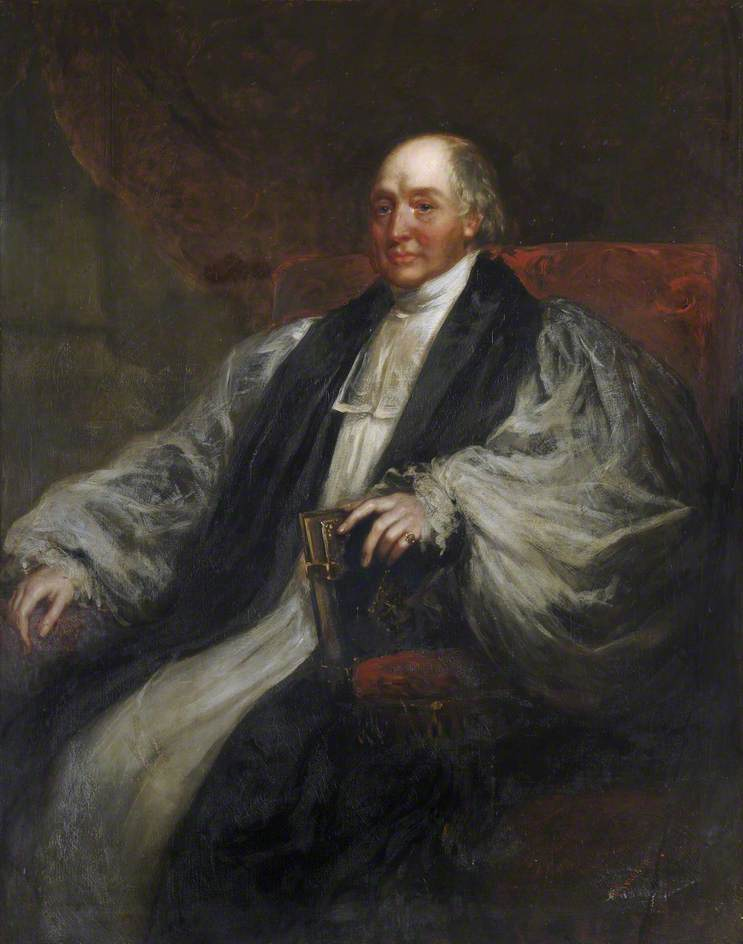
- James Henry Monk by Richard Buckner
- Diocese: Diocese of Gloucester and Bristol
- In office: 1836–1856
- Predecessor: Himself as Bishop of Gloucester
- Successor: Charles Baring
- Other posts: Dean of Peterborough (1822–1830); Bishop of Gloucester (1830–1836)

Personal details
- Born: 12 December 1784
- Died: 6 June 1856 (aged 71)
- Buried: Westminster Abbey
- Denomination: Anglican
- Spouse: Jane Hughes
- Education: Norwich School; Charterhouse School
- Alma mater: Trinity College, Cambridge

James Henry Monk (12 December 1784 – 6 June 1856) was an English divine and classical scholar.

== Life ==
He was born at Buntingford, Hertfordshire. He was educated at Norwich School, Charterhouse School and Trinity College, Cambridge, and in 1809 was elected Regius Professor of Greek in succession to Richard Porson. The establishment of the Classical Tripos was in great measure due to his efforts. In 1822 he was appointed Dean of Peterborough; in 1830, bishop of Gloucester (with which the see of Bristol was amalgamated in 1836). He took his seat in the House of Lords in July 1831.

== Works ==
He is best known as the author of a Life of Bentley (1830) and as the editor (with CJ Blomfield) of Porson's Adversaria (1812).

Church of England titles
Preceded by Thomas Kipling	Dean of Peterborough; 1822–1830	Succeeded by Thomas Turton
Preceded by Christopher Bethell	Bishop of Gloucester; 1830–1836	Succeeded by Himself as Bishop of Gloucester and Bristol
Preceded by Himself as Bishop of Gloucester; Joseph Allen as Bishop of Bristol	Bishop of Gloucester and Bristol; 1836–1856	Succeeded by Charles Baring
