= Livesey, Hargreaves and Company =

English textile company

- Industry: Textiles
- Defunct: 1788
- Fate: Bankruptcy
- Headquarters: Lancashire, England

Livesey, Hargreaves and Company was an English business involved in the textile industry during the late 18th century.

== Business ==
The company took a lead in the mechanisation of printing cloth using a process that had been developed by Thomas Bell. In 1783, Bell patented a method of printing on fabric from engraved cylinders, and by 1785 he was able to print in six colours by this process. Before that time the printing of fabric had been by hand, and the hand printers had been demanding higher wages. During the 1780s, the firm was the largest calico printer in Lancashire and was "one of the largest cotton manufacturing enterprises in the early stages of the Industrial Revolution". The printing process was carried out at their factories at Bannister Hall and at Mosney, both in Walton-le-Dale, near Preston, Lancashire. The firm also had a large mill at Clitheroe, a factory, warehouse and offices in Manchester, a warehouse in London, and were involved in bleaching cloth at Hoghton. It also owned a coal mine at Standish to provide fuel for its enterprises, and commissioned work from handloom weavers working in their own homes (out-workers).

== Collapse ==
The firm went bankrupt in 1788, with debts totalling £1.5 million (equivalent to £196 million in 2025). It is thought that at the time they employed about 800 workers directly, and were providing "bread to 20,000 persons" (this would include direct employees, out-workers, and their dependants). The firm's bank was Byrom, Allen, Sedgwick and Place of Manchester, which had been founded in 1771. By 1780 it was managed solely by William Allen, who made extensive loans to Livesey, Hargreaves and Company; Allen was related by marriage to the Liveseys. Two days after the firm was declared bankrupt, the bank collapsed, and Allen was also bankrupt.
