= Lectionary 223 =

15th century New Testament manuscript

Lectionary ℓ 223
- New Testament manuscript
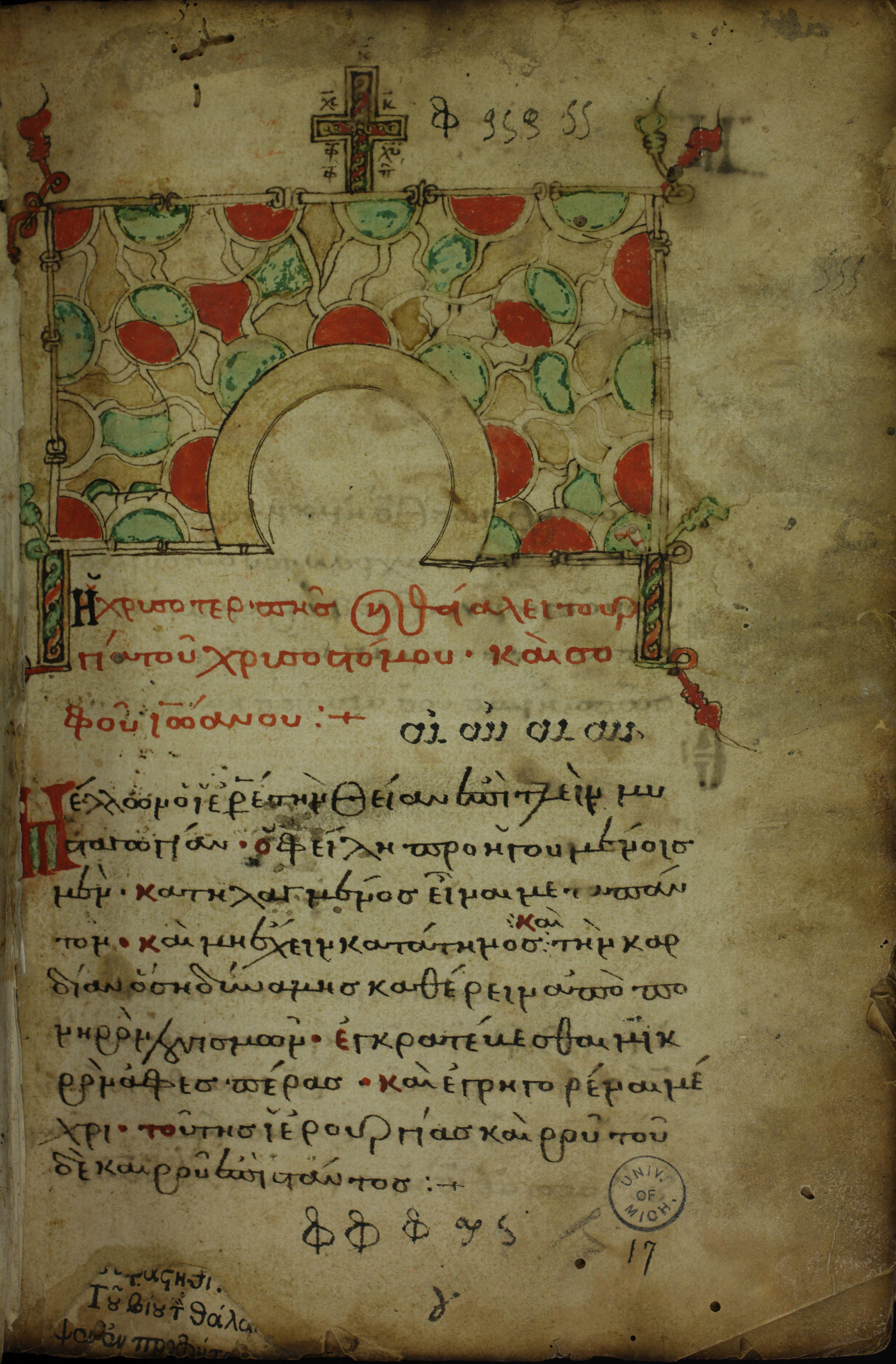
- Text: Evangelistarium, Apostolarium
- Date: 15th century
- Script: Greek
- Now at: University of Michigan
- Size: 21 cm by 15.4 cm
- Hand: carelessly written
- Note: poor condition

Lectionary 223, designated by siglum ℓ 223 (in the Gregory-Aland numbering) is a Greek manuscript of the New Testament, on paper. Palaeographically it has been assigned to the 15th century. Frederick Henry Ambrose Scrivener labelled it by 252^{evl}. It contains much additional material, liturgical and secular.

== Description ==
The codex contains 28 lessons from the Gospels and Epistles (Evangelistarium, Apostolarium), on 174 paper leaves (21 cm by 15.4 cm). The text is written in Greek minuscule letters, in one column per page, 22 lines per page.

It contains also Menologion, liturgies of John Chrysostom, Basil of Caesarea, and of the Presanctified Gifts (as Lectionary 216), Prayers for Saints' days, a table of lunar days with curious notes both biblical and astronomical, Psalm 135 (LXX), and other miscellaneous pieces, liturgical or secular, on coarse paper. Scrivener stated "a strange volume indeed".

It is full of the errors of itacism, poor illuminations, and careless errors (e.g. 2 Timothy 2:6). It is "too incorrect to be much of value", though it has no errors with iota subscriptum or iota adscriptum.

The manuscript has survived in bad condition.

== History ==
Scrivener dated the manuscript to the 14th or 15th century, Gregory to the 14th century. It has been assigned by the Institute for New Testament Textual Research (INTF) to the 15th century.

Of the history of the codex nothing is known until the year 1864, when it was in the possession of a dealer at Janina in Epeiros. It was then purchased from him by a representative of Baroness Burdett-Coutts (1814–1906), a philanthropist, along with other Greek manuscripts. They were transported to England in 1870-1871. The manuscript was presented by Burdett-Coutts to Sir Roger Cholmely's School, and was housed at the Highgate (Burdett-Coutts III. 29), in London.

The manuscript was added to the list of New Testament manuscripts by Scrivener (number 252) and Gregory (number 223). Gregory saw it in 1883. The manuscript was acquired for the University of Michigan in 1922. It was digitalized by the Center for the Study of New Testament Manuscripts in 2008.

The manuscript is sporadically cited in the critical editions of the Greek New Testament (UBS3).

The codex is housed at the University of Michigan (Ms. 17) in [Ann Arbor, Michigan.

== See also ==
- List of New Testament lectionaries
- Biblical manuscript
- Textual criticism

== Bibliography ==
- Frederick Henry Ambrose Scrivener, Adversaria Critica Sacra: With a Short Explanatory Introduction (Cambridge, 1893), pp. LXVII-LXVIII (as v)
- Kenneth W. Clark, A Descriptive Catalogue of Greek New Testament Manuscripts in America (Chicago, 1937), pp. 284-285.
