= University of Exeter Halls of Residence =

Student housing at the University of Exeter, England

Coordinates: 50.735°N 3.534°W

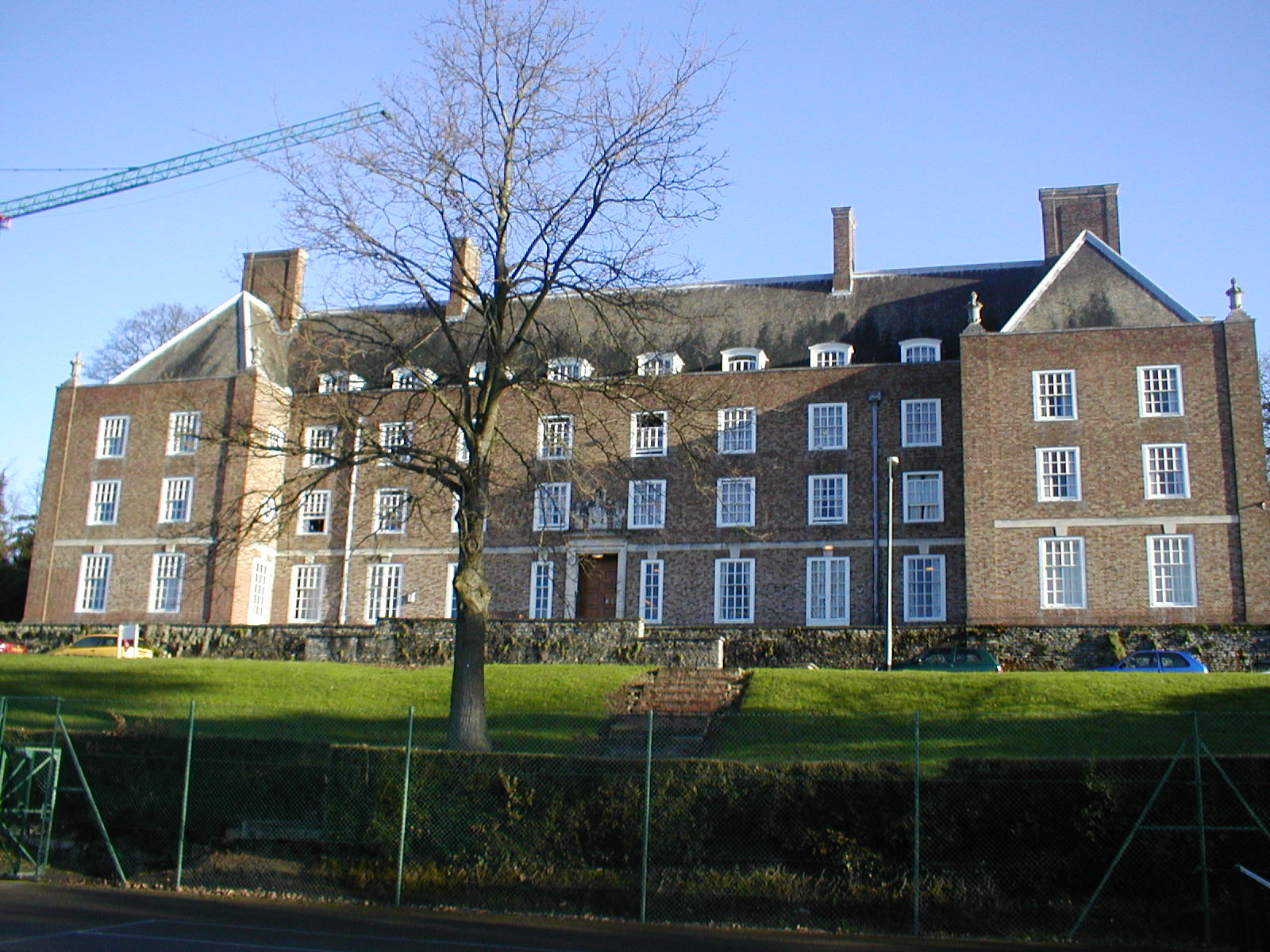
Mardon Hall (1933), the first purpose-built hall

The University of Exeter offers approximately 6,500 purpose-built student bed spaces for its students. The majority of its residences are located on campus, although 30% of self-catered accommodations (particularly for the St Lukes Campus) are located off-campus.

The first accommodation for students was in the city centre during the first years of the 20th century, and the first purpose-built hall was Mardon Hall, opened in 1933.

== Early history ==
The university developed from the 19th century Royal Albert Memorial College, and by 1902 it was apparent that accommodation was needed for the female students with a house in Castle Street being privately run as a hostel for them. In 1906 the city council bought the house, extended it and renamed it as Bradninch Hall. It offered housing for 78 female students and was the college's first hall of residence. During the First World War, Bradninch Hall was used as a Red Cross hospital and the students were moved to Hartwell House and two houses in Pennsylvania Road. After being extended in the 1920s, Hartwell House subsequently became Hope Hall, and the Pennsylvania Road properties became Kilmorie Hall.

In 1902, two houses in St. David's Hill were leased by the Diocesan Council for Religious Education as a hostel for female students. Known as Sandford Hall, it was taken over by the university college for two years from 1946. In 1904 the college rented a field known as Grâs Lawn in Barrack Road, east of the city centre. The college bought the field in 1912, intending it to be used for a hall of residence for male students, but this never occurred and the land was sold for housing in 1999.

In the early 1920s Reed Hall and two houses in Grendon Road were acquired to accommodate male students. Reed Hall now serves as a wedding and conference venue.

== Exeter Halls ==
The Exeter Halls, on Streatham Campus, are Hope Hall, Lopes Hall, Pennsylvania Court, Ransom Pickard, as well as formerly Lazenby and Kilmorie Hall. James Owen Court is also a part of Exeter Halls, although it is self catered, and therefore not generally considered. The combined student total is around 700 .

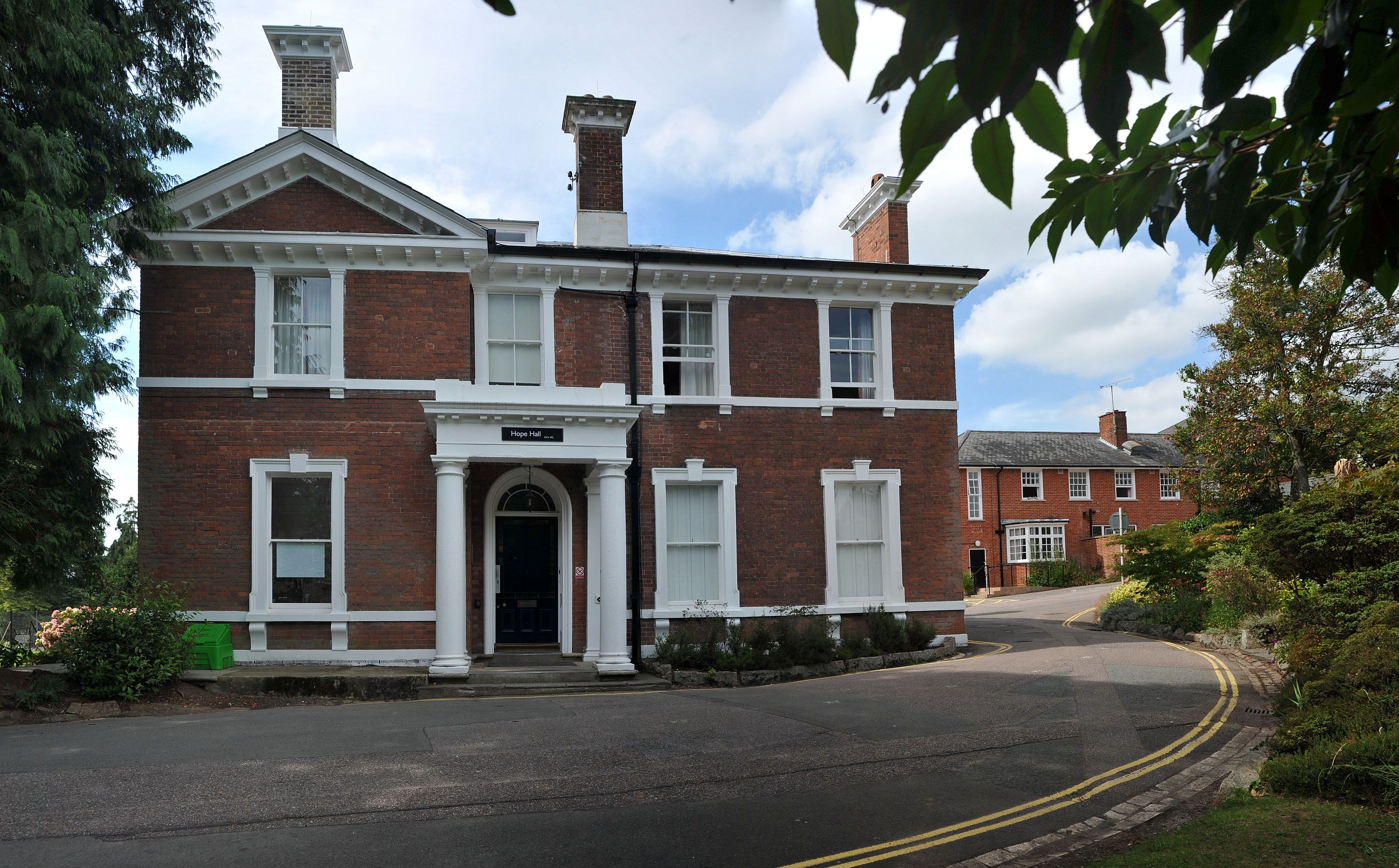
Hope Hall

=== Hope Hall ===
Hope Hall accommodated around 60 students in three converted family homes. Originally opened in 1915 as an all-girls residence and named Hartwell House, it was reopened and renamed as Hope Hall in 1925 by the Duke and Duchess of York after Helena Hope, due to her generous donations. A painting of Helena Hope hangs in the main foyer. The hall was visited by Queen Mary in 1938.

Hope Hall has picturesque grounds that are just across the lawn from Lazenby, which itself accommodated around 18 students. Both buildings have features such as original fireplaces, antique wall hangings and ceiling decorations.

Containing a TV room, laundry facilities and a bar called 'The Badger' (in use intermittently as of 2010), the hall was a catered residence with a small kitchenette on each floor. It had until recently, an operating dining room in which its annexe buildings, Lazenby, Byrne House (formerly Montefiore, now office space for Egenis, the Centre for the Study of Life Sciences) and Spreytonway (now derelict), all dined in. Now the room is used as a social space, in particular for dance societies.

In 2013, Hope Hall and Lazenby were both refurbished to provide additional office and research space for university staff. As of 2014, Hope Hall accommodates research and administrative staff from the College of Engineering, Mathematics and Physical Sciences, postgraduate students of the Business School and the Health, Safety and Environment Office. The Badger Bar in Hope Hall remains as a social and networking space and the dining room is an open plan office for the business school.

Similar plans to convert Spreytonway have been shelved for financial reasons. The building is in a deteriorating state - as of 2015 the glass has been removed from the verandas for safety, slates have slipped from the roof and the plaster on lath ceiling has collapsed in one upstairs room visible through a window. Services have been switched off. Spreytonway's yard and outbuildings remain in use by the grounds maintenance team and as parking for the university's minibus fleet. Spreytonway is a locally listed building and is classified as having a positive contribution to townscape in the university's 2010 Streatham Campus Master Plan Framework.

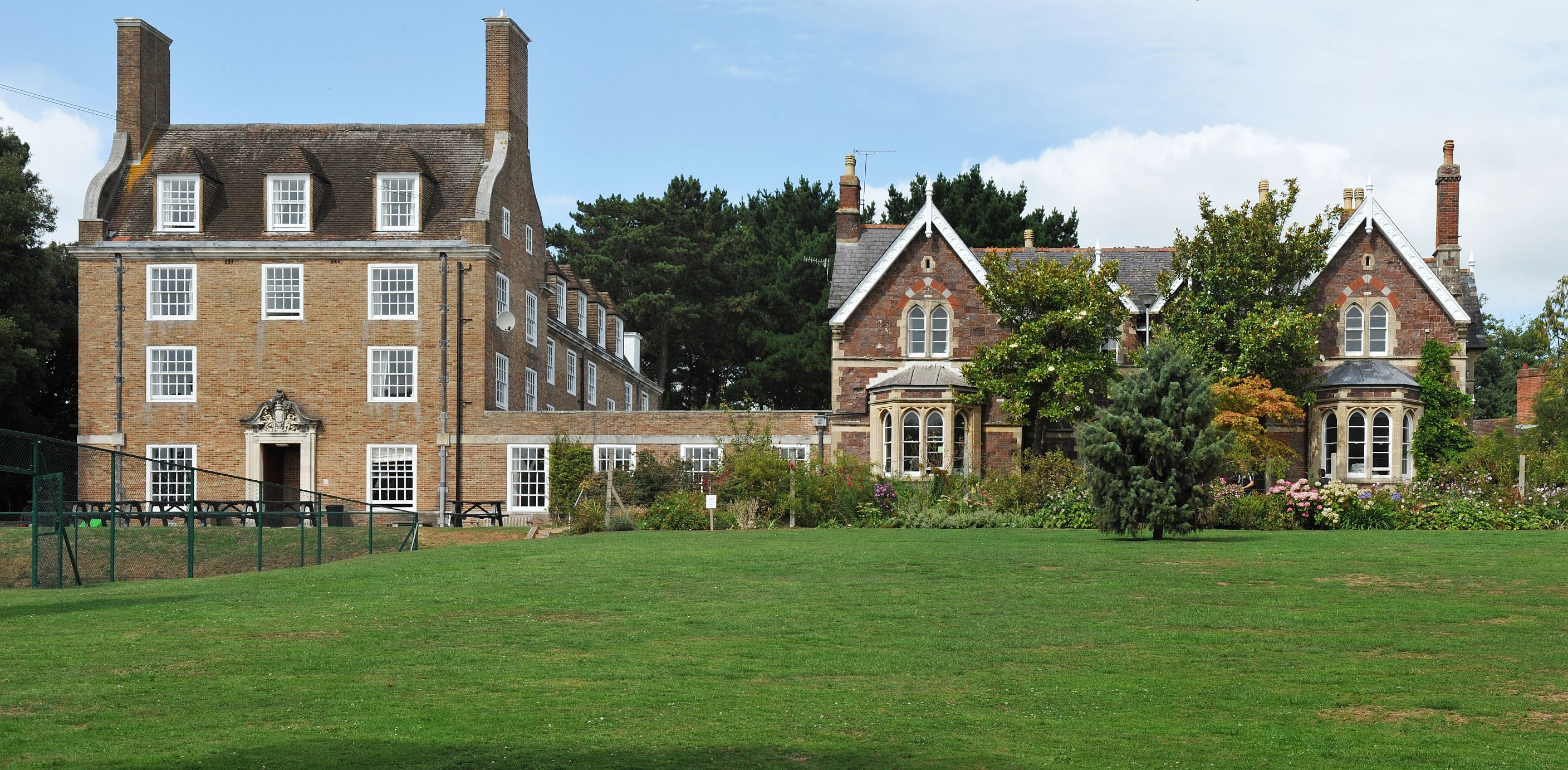
Lopes Hall

=== Lopes Hall ===
Lopes (pronounced "Lopez") Hall was originally a large Victorian Gothic villa known as "Highlands", built in 1866. After the university bought it and the surrounding seven acres of land in 1930, the architect E. Vincent Harris added a brick Queen Anne-style extension and it was opened by United States Ambassador Robert Bingham in October 1933, for women students only. It is named after Henry Lopes, 1st Baron Roborough who was president of the college.

Today Lopes Hall consists of a main building with 57 standard rooms, and contains the main Exeter Halls reception, a common room, laundry facilities, study room and library. The main building consists of the Old House (Nunnery) and the Main Wing. It now houses around 100, both male and female first year students with shared bathrooms and spacious rooms.

=== Pennsylvania Court ===
Pennsylvania Court (Penny C) was finished in 2004. In contrast to the traditional appearance of the rest of Exeter Halls, Pennsylvania Court is more modern, in both its appearance and facilities. It contains 4-star en-suite accommodation including balconies, heated towel rails and double beds. Housing around 180 students, Pennsylvania Court is generally the most oversubscribed hall on campus.

=== Ransom Pickard ===
Ransom Pickard (Ranny P) was built in the 1960s, but completely refurbished in 2008. Ransom Pickard is separated into two blocks, A and B, joined by a central staircase. These two blocks are in turn separated into three floors, each of which has space for 16 people. There are four double rooms to a floor and eight single rooms. Ransom Pickard has single beds, a desk, wardrobe and sink to each room and since the refurbishment now falls under the category of 'single enhanced' in terms of accommodation.

New Birks Grange

== Birks Grange ==
In 2005, Birks Grange, formerly Birks Halls (1966–2004), completed a multimillion-pound redevelopment with the residential block being completely rebuilt and the central block being redesigned and renovated. The central block was equipped with a new porter's lodge, a modern canteen and a renovated hall bar named 'The Boot', and a shop. Birks Grange has accessible rooms for people with disabilities.

Birks Grange now encompasses Moberly House (standard rooms), and together make up the largest hall in the University of Exeter with 360 undergraduates in Birks Grange and 152 in Moberly. The colours for Birks Grange is blue, whilst that of Moberly House is green. The main motto is "Together we stand", whilst each hall has a slogan that identifies itself. The informal slogan for Birks Grange is currently "Best legs on Campus" - due to Cardiac Hill, the steep path leading up from Birks Grange to the campus. The motto for Birks is "Excelsior" (Ever Upward), and the informal slogan for Moberly House is "Last one standing", which refers to the last remaining hall of the recently demolished Duryard Halls.

=== Birks Grange Village ===
Building works were completed in September 2011 providing en-suite, enhanced and studio self-catered accommodation on the hills opposite Birks Grange and the green area between the central block and the catered blocks to accommodate for more than 800 students. The halls have collectively become known as Birks Grange Village. The university hopes that these brand new halls will enable them to increase student intake, and thus maintain the institution's 9th-place ranking within the country.

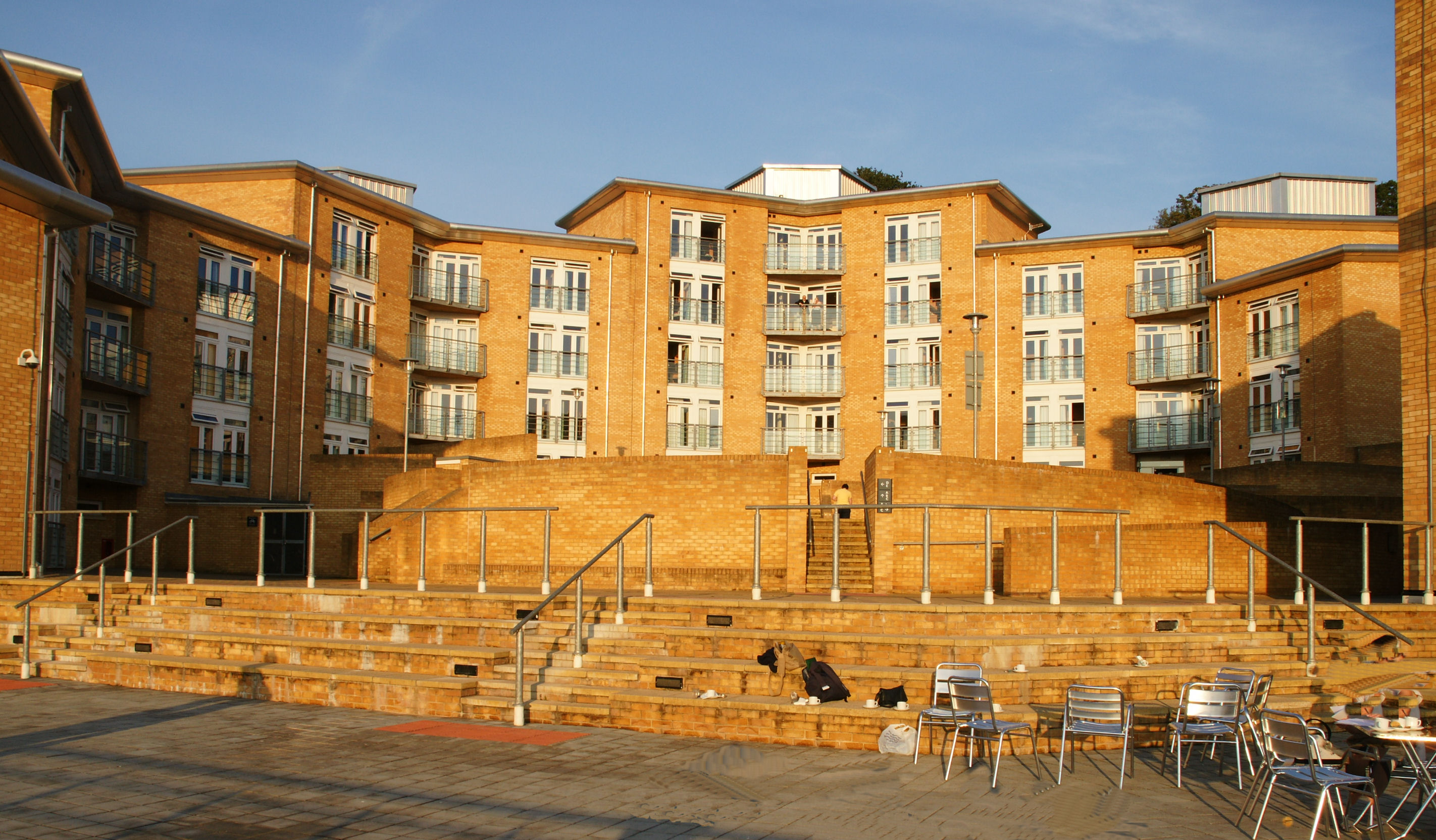
Holland Hall

== Holland Hall ==
Holland Hall is named after Sir Geoffrey Holland, the Vice-Chancellor of the university who retired in 2002. It opened in September 2004, and features both catered rooms and studios.

The hall has rooms for 406 undergraduates and has a restaurant that seats 360. It is on the north-east side of Streatham Campus and has good views over the River Exe. The accommodation is utilised as a hotel during non term time, particularly by guests to conferences or events on campus.

The crest on Mardon Hall

== Mardon Hall ==
As of 2011, Mardon Hall provides accommodation for a total of 106 students in 48 single rooms and 29 shared rooms, with shared bathroom facilities.

Designed in a 'country house' style by E. Vincent Harris, Mardon Hall opened in 1933, and was extensively refurbished in 1996, but retains its wood-panelled library and grand staircase. It was the University College of the South West's first purpose-built hall of residence. This was 22 years before the university gained its charter, becoming the University of Exeter in 1955.

Mardon Hall was financed by the College Appeal and Flight Lieutenant Evelyn Mardon, who donated £25,000 towards the building cost and after whom it was named. One of the original notable features of Mardon Hall was the wooden hut that was used as a dining hall until shortly after Holland Hall was built, due to the University College's lack of funds at the time of Mardon's construction.

In early planning against the outbreak of war the Government indicated a wish to use Mardon Hall as a hospital, but it continued as student accommodation until 1943, when it was taken over by the American Red Cross as a rest centre and Psychological Hospital for American troops. A wartime German map, held by the Devon Record Office, has the adjacent Reed Hall and the university's Washington Singer Laboratories marked as military targets, but not Mardon. The Hall was returned to student use in 1945.

During the 1970s, the Warden was the Dr FR Oliver MA DPhil, who was awarded 'the most boring lecturer in the UK' by Radio 4 on several occasions for his lecture 'The correlation coefficient' for first-year economics students.

The Hall accommodated men only until women were admitted in 1986, when "too many" women applied for University accommodation, but "not enough" Mardon Bar was known as "The Beaver", although it has been out of action since 2007.

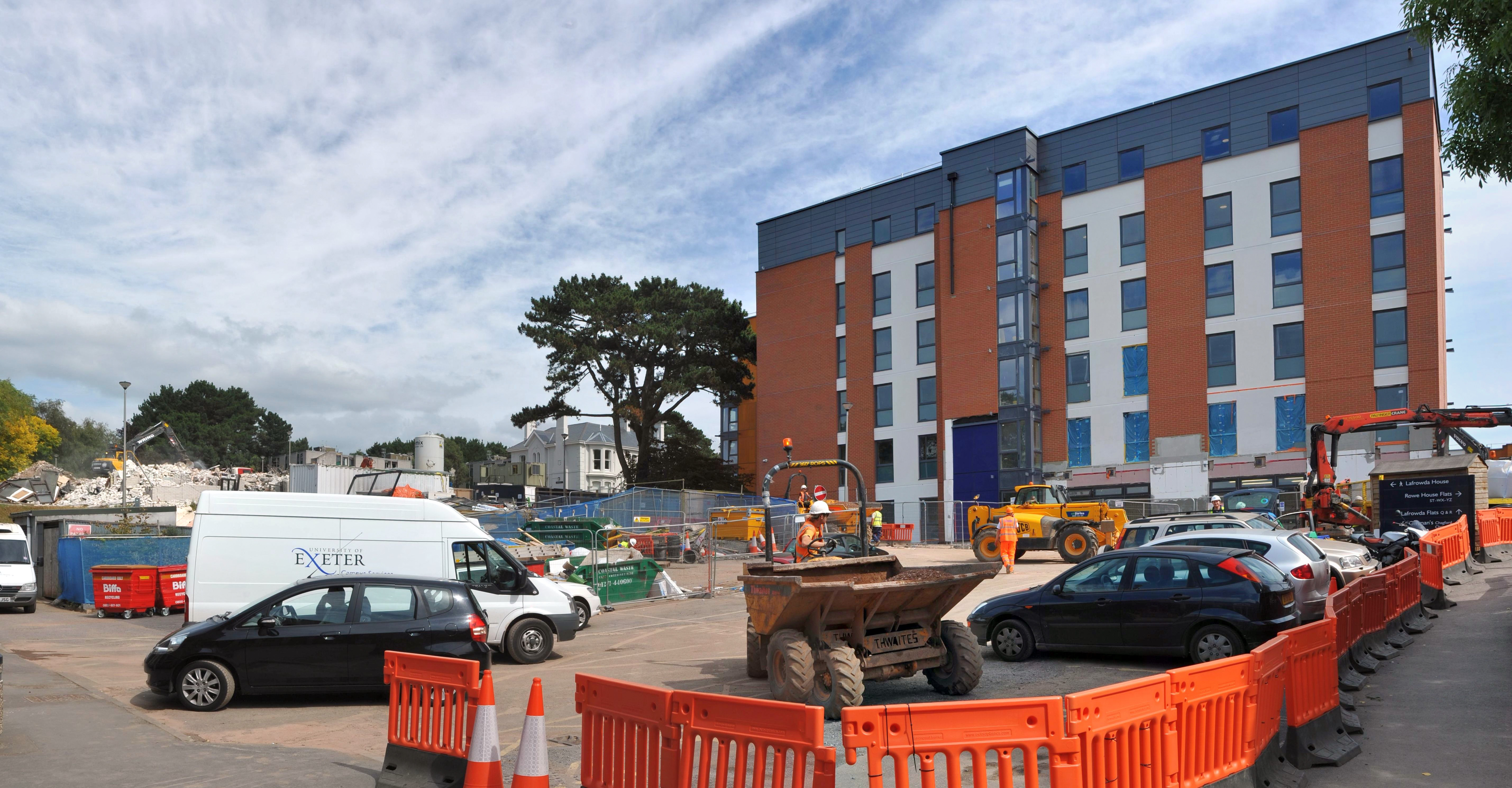
Building work at Lafrowda, August 2011

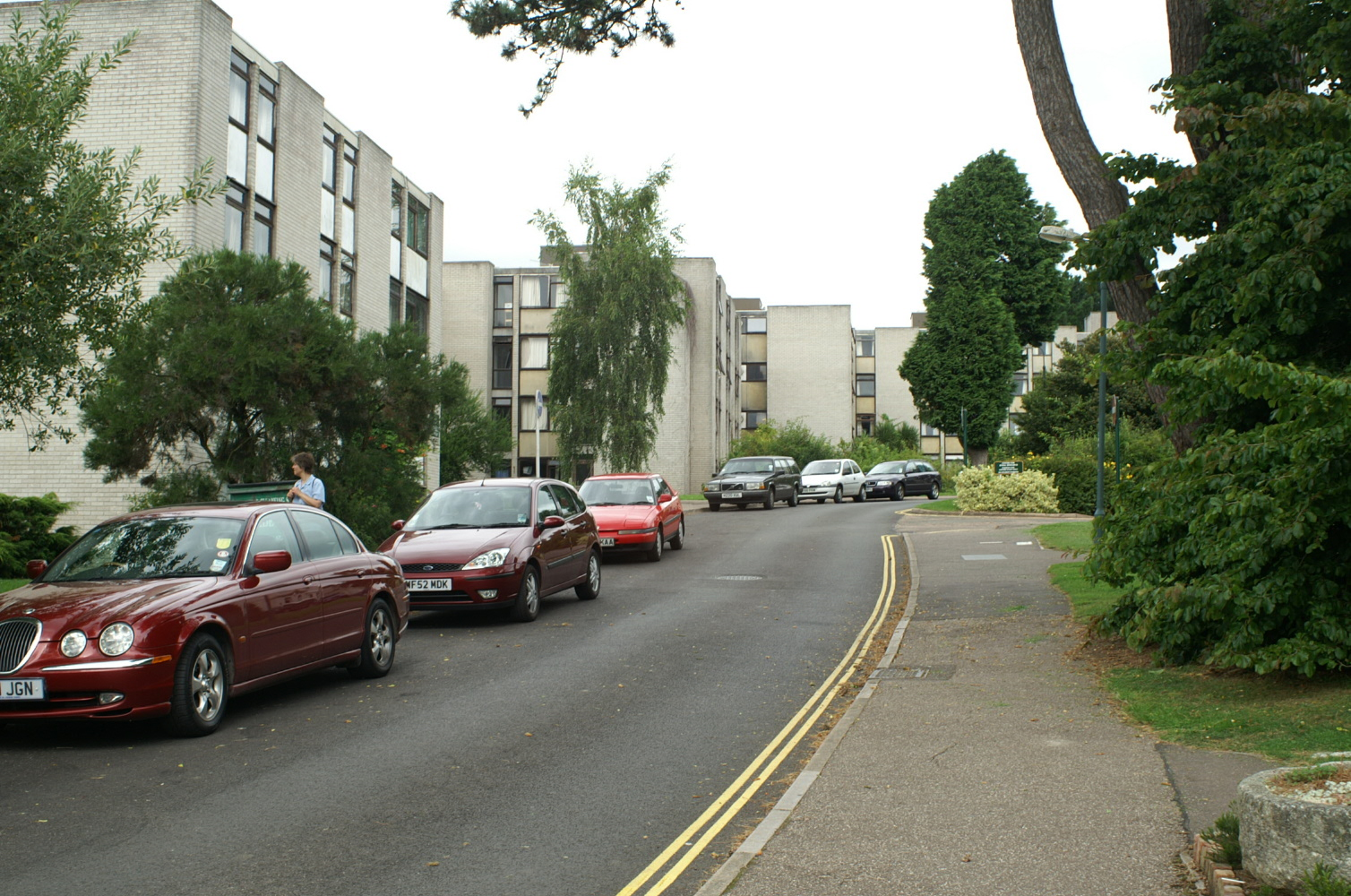
The original 1970s Lafrowda Flats

== Self-catered accommodation ==
The original Lafrowda flats that were built in 1971 and 1976 were sold to the University Partnership Programme (UPP) in 2009 and are being demolished. Four new accommodation blocks are intended to be available by September 2011 with a further three blocks due for completion the following year, providing a total of 921 residences.

Llewellyn Mews is self-catered accommodation situated just off-campus on King Edward Street. Like Birks Grange, residents use Cardiac Hill to get to campus.

East Park is the newest self-catered accommodation, with construction completed in 2021. There are 270 standard bedrooms, and 912 en-suites. Students access campus via Forum Hill.

Other self-catered residences both on- and off-campus include Bonhay House, Clydesdale Court, Clydesdale Rise, James Owen Court, King Edward Court, King Edward Studio, Nash Grove, St Germans (University owned), Rowe House (University owned), Point Exe (Signpost Homes), Northernhay, and Northfield (UNITE).

== St Luke's Campus and Rowancroft ==
Consisting of College House, South Cloisters, New Nancherrow and Old Nancherrow, all accommodation on St Luke's Campus shares a single halls committee, and is often considered as simply "St Luke's halls" by non-residents.

As of 2011, Rowancroft consists of a total of 386 places in various self-catered accommodation on sites to the east of the city centre, close to St Luke's Campus and the suburb of Heavitree. The residences are shared between undergraduates and postgraduates.

== Penryn Campus ==
Penryn Campus near Penryn in Cornwall contains Glasney Student Village and nearby is The Sidings, opened in September 2012. Former halls were Beringer House and MacWilliam which were halls of residence for fresher and graduate students respectively at the Camborne School of Mines in Camborne, until the school moved in 2004. Beringer House was a two-storey building constructed from Cornish granite and concrete and was named after one of the school's founders, J Beringer.

== Former halls ==
Thomas Hall

=== Thomas Hall ===
Thomas Hall has not been used as a hall of residence since 2002/2003. The hall was built as Great Duryard House in about 1690 by Sir Thomas Jefford, mayor of Exeter. The Manor of Duryard was originally owned by the city of Exeter, but was sold off in the 17th century. Inside the hall is linenfold panelling said to have come from Exeter Guildhall. In 1936 it was renamed Thomas Hall after Charles Vivian Thomas, a Cornish businessman who helped fund its transfer to the university.

Originally providing accommodation for male students, during the early part of World War II it was used for the students of the Royal Free Hospital Medical School who were evacuated to the city. After the war it was a hall for female students. In July 2013, the new Exeter Steiner Academy announced that it had secured the purchase of the hall for use as its permanent school premises from 2015.

=== Duryard Halls ===
Duryard Halls provided accommodation from 1964 until 2007, latterly for around 650 students. These halls were the residence of Harry Potter author JK Rowling, as well as pop singer and winner of Pop Idol Will Young and actor Adam Campbell, who shared a room in Hetherington House.

Duryard Halls were spread over four houses, surrounding the old Duryard House and its drive: Moberly named after Walter Hamilton Moberly; Murray, named after John Murray; Hetherington, named after Hector Hetherington; and Jessie Montgomery. In 2007 demolition work started on all the halls, except for Moberly and the grade II listed Duryard House, with the intention of providing seven new accommodation blocks to house 630 students.

Moberly Hall fell out of use in the academic year 2012/13, although was re-occupied in 2014/15.

Part of Jessie Montgomery hall remains as the Grade II listed stable block, which was used as a site office accommodation during the construction of the new UPP and INTO halls of residence and is now used as storage.

The central block has undergone a deep refurbishment as a music facility and is known as Kay House. Together with Cornwall House on the main part of the campus, it formed a test bed for the retrofitting of external wall insulation to improve its thermal efficiency.

The new halls are operated by INTO (Avon, Bovey, Dart and Exe halls, along with the listed Duryard House which is used as a social space and offices) and UPP (Teign and Yeo).

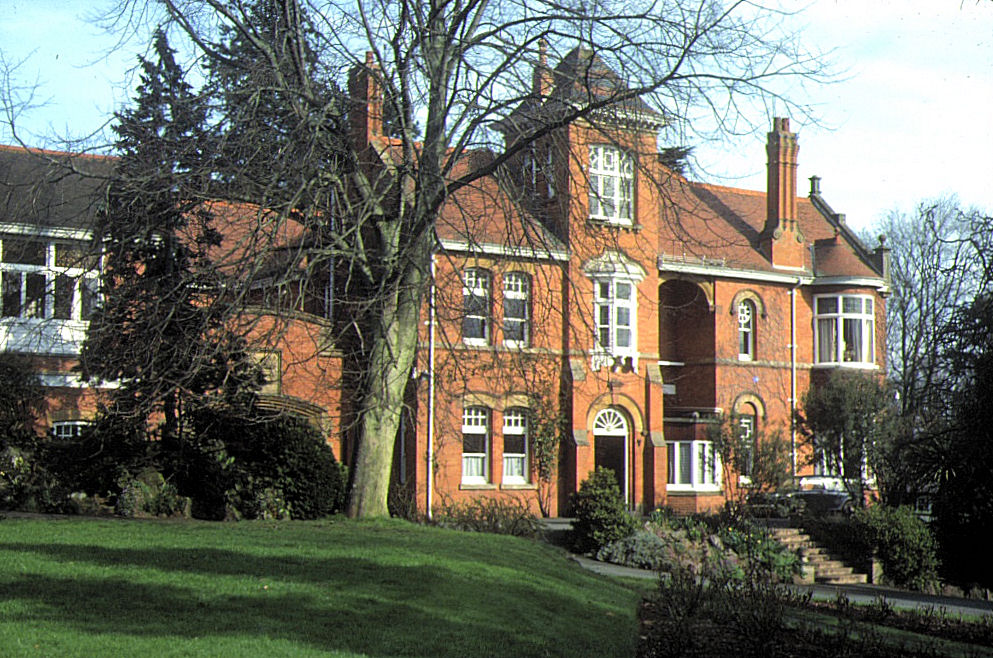
Crossmead Main Hall in 1976

=== Crossmead Hall ===
Crossmead was located across the river at the top of Dunsford Hill. In the 1980s the lower part of the grounds on the corner of Barley Lane and Dunsford Hill was developed as Cadogan Court, a nursing home. Crossmead was closed as a hall and used by the university as a conference centre. This closed in 2006. There was controversy in autumn 2005 when the university applied to build 36 flats and 54 houses on the site; proposals that were bitterly opposed by the local residents.

== See also ==
- University of Exeter

== Sources ==
- Caldwell, John (1962), "Notes on the History of the University of Exeter", Report and Transactions of the Devonshire Association, XCIV: 413–426
