= Jessie Montgomery (Exeter) =

English education and suffrage activist

- Born: Jessie Anne Douglas Montgomery; 6 August 1851; London
- Died: 13 October 1918 (aged 67); Southampton
- Organisation(s): National Union of Women's Suffrage Societies; Conservative and Unionist Women's Franchise Association
- Known for: Activism for women's education and foundation of University of Exeter
- Political party: Conservative and Unionist Party
- Father: Robert Montgomery
- Relatives: Frederic Charles Cook (uncle)

Jessie Anne Douglas Montgomery (1851–1918), known as Jessie Montgomery, was an English educational administrator, activist and suffragist associated with women's formal education in the Exeter area.

== Early life ==
Montgomery was born on 6 August 1851 in London to the Rev. Robert Montgomery (1807–1855) and his wife Rachel Catherine Andrews McKenzie (1814−1882). On Robert's death, his widow and daughter moved to Exeter, where they lived in the Cathedral Close with Rachel's sister, Jessie Barbara Cook (1811–1899), and her husband, Rev. Frederic Charles Cook (1805–1889), Canon of Exeter Cathedral.

After her mother's death in 1882, Montgomery moved to a large house in Baring Crescent, Exeter.

== Education career ==
Despite limited opportunities for her own education, Montgomery became an activist over several decades for women's education in the Exeter area. Having successfully completed several courses at the Exeter Museum Centre, she became joint secretary to the University Extension Centre, and convenor of the Ladies' Students' Association. She became a governor of the Royal Albert Memorial Museum College, which became the Royal Albert Memorial College, the forerunner of both the University College of the South-West and then the University of Exeter.

== Suffragist ==
Montgomery inaugurated the Exeter Branch of the National Union of Women's Suffrage Societies, and became its first secretary (1909–1911). Despite her organisation, activism and public speaking for women's suffrage, she did not survive long enough to cast a vote.

== Death and legacy ==
On 13 October 1918, aged 67, Montgomery died in hospital in Southampton during an operation.

She is commemorated by a memorial in the Exeter Cathedral.

A house in the University of Exeter former Duryard Halls of Residence was named "Jessie Montgomery" in her honour. A Common Room at Duryard Hall was previously named after her.

A primary school in St Thomas, Exeter, built in the 1930s, was named Montgomery Primary School in her honour.
