= John Hollingworth (priest) =

John Banks Hollingworth (14 December 1779 – 9 February 1856) was Archdeacon of Huntingdon from 25 February 1828 until his death.

Hollingworth was born in London to John and Elizabeth Hollingworth. He was educated at Peterhouse, Cambridge and ordained in 1804. He held incumbencies at Little St Mary's, Cambridge and St Margaret Lothbury; and was Norrisian Professor of Divinity from 1824 to 1838.

Anglican Communion titles
Preceded by Thomas Jackson	Norrisian Professor of Divinity; 1824 – 1838	Succeeded by George Elwes Corrie
Church of England titles
Preceded by James Hook	Archdeacon of Huntingdon; 1828 – 1856	Succeeded by Henry Reginald Yorke
