= Harold Browne =

19th-century Anglican Bishop of Winchester

The Right Reverend Harold Browne
- Bishop of Winchester
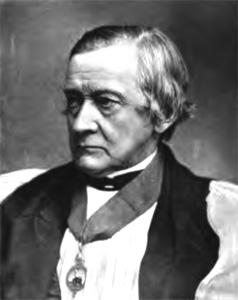
- Church: Church of England
- Diocese: Diocese of Winchester
- In office: 1873–1890
- Predecessor: Samuel Wilberforce
- Successor: Anthony Thorold
- Other posts: Norrisian Professor of Divinity (1854–1864); Bishop of Ely (1864–1873)

Orders
- Ordination: 1836 (deacon); 1837 (priest)
- Consecration: 1864

Personal details
- Born: 6 March 1811 Aylesbury, Buckinghamshire, UK
- Died: 18 December 1891 (aged 80) Bitterne, Hampshire, UK
- Denomination: Anglicanism
- Residence: Shales House, Bitterne (at death)
- Parents: Robert and Sarah
- Spouse: Elizabeth (m. 1840–1891)
- Profession: Theologian
- Education: Eton College; Emmanuel College, Cambridge

Edward Harold Browne (6 March 1811 – 18 December 1891) was a bishop of the Church of England.

== Early life and education ==
Browne was born on 6 March 1811 at Aylesbury, Buckinghamshire, the second son of Robert Browne of Morton House in Buckinghamshire, colonel in the Buckinghamshire Militia, and of Sarah Dorothea Steward; and younger brother to Thomas Gore Browne. He was educated at Eton College and Emmanuel College, Cambridge. After securing his BA in 1832, he won the Crosse theological scholarship in 1833, the Tyrwhitt Hebrew scholarship in 1834, and the Norrisian prize in 1835. He graduated with his MA in 1836, was elected fellow of Emmanuel in 1837, and appointed senior tutor in 1838. In 1854 he was elected Norrisian Professor of Divinity at Cambridge. He took the BD in 1855 and the DD in 1864.

== Early career ==
Browne was ordained deacon on 26 November 1836 by Joseph Allen, Bishop of Ely; and priest, again by Allen, on 3 December 1837. In 1841, he accepted a curacy in Exeter (St Sidwell's), but in 1843 moved to Wales as Vice-Principal of St David's College. In 1849, he took a benefice in Cornwall, to which was attached a prebendal stall in Exeter Cathedral, which he exchanged in 1857 for a canonry in the same and the living of Heavitree.

== Later career ==
In 1854, Browne was appointed to the Norrisian chair of divinity at the University of Cambridge but held his livings in the Diocese of Exeter concurrently. (The Cornish benefice was the vicarage of Kenwyn and Kea.) On 29 March 1864 he was consecrated Bishop of Ely by Charles Longley, Archbishop of Canterbury (assisted by Connop Thirlwall, Bishop of St David's and Henry Philpott, Bishop of Worcester) at Westminster Abbey; he was enthroned at Ely Cathedral on 26 April. During his time at Ely he returned to his hometown for the re-opening of a newly refurbished church of St. Mary the Virgin, Aylesbury in 1869. In December 1873, he was translated to the see of Winchester; he was enthroned at Winchester Cathedral on 11 December.

On Sunday 21 May 1885, Browne ordained as deacon of the first deaf-mute Anglican clergyman, Richard Aslatt Pearce.

Browne resigned his See in 1890 and died at Shales House near Bitterne on 18 December 1891.

== Legacy ==
Browne was a high churchman and in 1885, he set up the first diocesan organisation of the Mothers' Union, which had previously been a simple parish meeting chaired by Mary Sumner in Old Alresford.

Browne was a moderating influence in the conflict arising from Essays and Reviews and the Pentateuch criticism of J. W. Colenso. His work, An Exposition of the Thirty-nine Articles: Historical and Doctrinal. New York: E.P. Dutton. 1874. held its place as a standard work for many years.

== Publications ==
- The Pentateuch and the Elohistic Psalms, in reply to [The Pentateuch and Book of Joshua critically examined, by] bishop Colenso, five lectures
- The inspiration of Holy Scripture: being an essay

== Marriage and family ==
On 18 June 1840, Browne married Elizabeth Carlyon (daughter of Dr Clement Carlyon of Truro, Cornwall).

== Styles and titles ==
- 1811–1836: Harold Browne Esq
- 1836–1849: The Reverend Harold Browne
- 1849–1854: The Reverend Prebendary Harold Browne
- 1854–1857: The Reverend Prebendary Professor Harold Browne
- 1857–1864: The Reverend Canon Professor Harold Browne
- 1864–1890: The Right Reverend Doctor Harold Browne

== Sources ==
- Kitchin, George (1895). Edward Harold Browne, D.D., Lord Bishop of Winchester and Prelate of the Most Noble Order of the Garter. London: John Murray.
- Chisholm, Hugh, ed. (1911). "Browne, Edward Harold" . Encyclopædia Britannica. Vol. 4 (11th ed.). Cambridge University Press. p. 663.
- Buckland, Augustus Robert (1901). "Browne, Edward Harold" . In Lee, Sidney (ed.). Dictionary of National Biography (1st supplement). London: Smith, Elder & Co. p. 304.
- Cross, F. L.; Livingstone, Elizabeth A., eds. (2005). "Browne, Edward Harold". The Oxford Dictionary of the Christian Church. London: Oxford University Press. p. 244. ISBN 978-0-19-280290-3.

Honorary titles
Preceded by Alfred Ollivant	Vice-principal of St Davids College, Lampeter; 1843–1850	Succeeded by Rowland Williams
Academic offices
Preceded by George Corrie	Norrisian Professor of Divinity; 1854–1864	Succeeded by Charles Swainson
Church of England titles
Preceded by Thomas Turton	Bishop of Ely; 1864–1873	Succeeded by James Woodford
Preceded by Samuel Wilberforce	Bishop of Winchester; 1873–1890	Succeeded by Anthony Thorold
