= Robert Gray (bishop of Bristol) =

Bishop of Bristol

The Right Reverend Robert Gray
- Bishop of Bristol
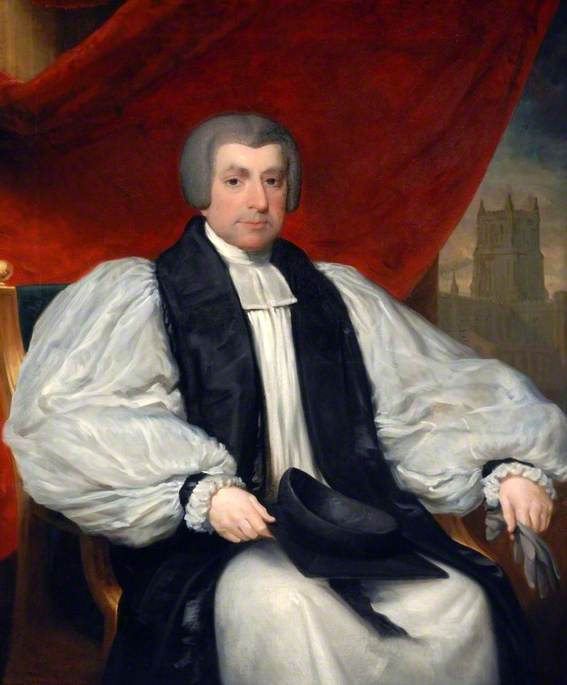
- Church: Church of England

Personal details
- Born: 11 March 1762
- Died: 28 September 1834 (aged 72)
- Children: Robert Gray
- Education: St Mary Hall, Oxford

Robert Gray (1762–1834) was an English Bishop of Bristol.

== Life ==
Born 11 March 1762, he was the son of Robert Gray, a London silversmith. Having entered St Mary Hall, Oxford, he graduated B.A. 1784, M. A, 1787, B.D. 1799, and D.D. 1802. Soon after 1790 he was presented to the vicarage of Faringdon, Berkshire.

In 1796 he was appointed Bampton lecturer, and his discourses were published the same year, under the title of Sermons on the Principles upon which the Reformation of the Church of England was established. Through the favour of Shute Barrington, Bishop of Durham, he was promoted, in 1800, to the rectory of Crayke, Yorkshire, and resigned Faringdon; in 1804 he was collated by Barrington to the seventh stall in Durham Cathedral, and again, in 1805, to the rectory of Bishopswearmouth, and resigned Crayke. He held this living, in which he had succeeded William Paley, until his elevation, in 1827, to the bishopric of Bristol.

In 1815, when he was Vicar of Bishopwearmouth, Robert Gray played an important part in one of the most important moments in the industrialisation of the World. After witnessing many mining accidents, it was Gray that wrote to Humphry Davy asking for his help with the problem of providing light safely in the local underground collieries. As a result, Davy visited the Northeast of England in August 1815 and discussed the problem with Colliery owners and mining expert John Buddle. Davy took samples of the gas to his London laboratory and designed his famous "miners lamp". Buddle was one of the first people to test the lamp. Stating in a report from the Select Committee on Accidents in Mines on the 4 September 1835 "I first tried the lamp in an explosive mixture on the surface; and then took it to the mine; it is impossible for me to express my feelings at the time when I first suspended the lamp in the mine and saw it red hot. I said to those around me: "We have at last subdued this monster [fire-damp]." Thus is recorded one of the most significant moments in the industrialization of the world. Davy did not patent his lamp effectively giving it to the Nation and the miners of the world.

The 1831 Bristol riots, during which Gray remained at his post

During the Bristol riots of 1831, when one of the minor canons suggested a postponement of divine service, since the rioters were masters of the city, Gray replied that it was his duty to be at his post. The service was held as usual, and he was himself the preacher. Before the close of the evening his palace was burned to the ground, and the loss which he sustained was estimated at £10,000. He died at Rodney House, Clifton, 28 September 1834, and was buried in the graveyard attached to Bristol Cathedral. A marble monument by Edward Hodges Baily was erected in the cathedral. His wife was Elizabeth, sister of Alderman Camplin of Bristol, with whom he had numerous children; including Robert Gray who became Bishop of Cape Town and Metropolitan of Africa.

== Works ==
His first literary undertaking was his 'Key to the Old testament and Apocrypha; or, an Account of their several Books, their Contents and Authors, and of the Times in which they were respectively written;' a work compiled on the plan of Thomas Percy's 'Key to the New Testament,' first published in 1790, and repeatedly reprinted. In 1793 he published 'Discourses on various subjects, illustrative of the Evidence, Influence, and Doctrines of Christianity;' and in 1794, 'Letters during the course of a Tour through Germany, Switzerland, and Italy, in 1791 and 1792.'

Gray also published sermons, and the following:

- 'Religious Union,' a sketch of a plan for uniting Roman Catholics and presbyterians with the established church, 1800.
- 'A Dialogue between a Churchman and a Methodist,' 1802, 5th edit. 1810.
- 'Theory of Dreams,' 2 vols., 1808, anonymous.
- 'Discourse at Bishopswearmouth', 1812, on the assassination of Spencer Perceval.
- 'The Connection between the Sacred Writings and the Literature of the Jewish and Heathen Authors, particularly that of the Classical Ages,' &c., 2 vols., 1816; 2nd edition 1819.

Church of England titles
Preceded by John Kaye	Bishop of Bristol; 1827–1834	Succeeded by Joseph Allen
