= Joseph Allen (bishop) =

Bishop of Bristol

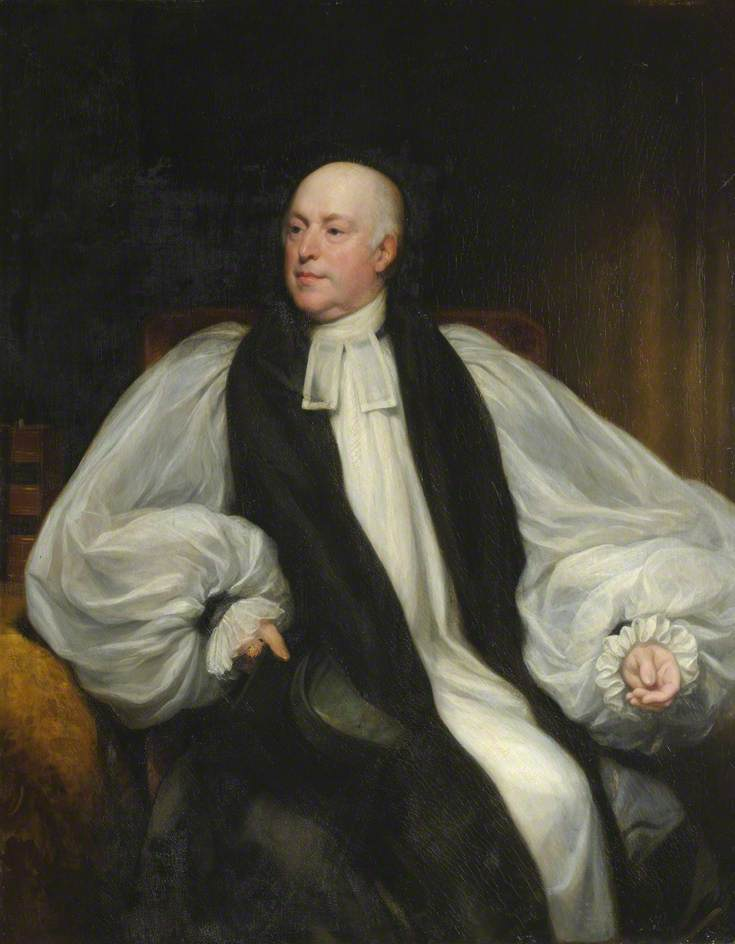
Bishop Allen, by Thomas Phillips

Joseph Allen (1770–20 March 1845) was a British clergyman. He was the son of William Allen and his wife Nelly Livesey. William Allen (d. 1792) was a partner in Manchester's first Bank, Byrom, Allen, Sedgwick and Place (founded 1771) but was made bankrupt in 1788 on the failure of the Bank. This was despite inheriting £20,000 from his father, John Allen, of Davyhulme Hall, Eccles. Allen was educated at the Free Grammar School, Manchester and at Trinity College, Cambridge (admitted 1788, scholar and prizeman, graduated B.A. (7th wrangler) 1792, M.A. 1795, D.D. 1829), where he gained a fellowship in 1793. He was ordained deacon in 1799 and priest in 1800.

He was private secretary to the 2nd Earl Spencer and tutor to his son, the 3rd Earl Spencer, when Viscount Althorp. He was appointed a prebendary of Westminster Abbey on 4 October 1806 which appointment he held until 1836, vicar of Battersea in 1808 (Battersea was in the gift of Lord Spencer) and vicar of St Bride's, Fleet Street in 1829. The fact that Allen held more than one living at the same time was not uncommon in the eighteenth and nineteenth centuries.

He was Bishop of Bristol from 1834 to 1836, when he was translated to become Bishop of Ely. He died in that office in 1845. There is a memorial to him in the South Choir Aisle of Ely Cathedral.

It was during Allen's episcopate (in 1837) that the Counties of Huntingdon and Bedford, and the Archdeaconry of Sudbury were added to the Diocese.

By his wife Margaret Ashley (whom he married on 19 May 1807 at Frodsham, Cheshire), Allen had three sons and a daughter:

- George John Allen (1810–1883), of Trinity College, Cambridge, barrister and Master of Dulwich College
- William Joseph Allen (1812–1888), Bengal Civil Service (1829–1865)
- Robert Allen (1816–1846), of Corpus Christi College, Cambridge, died in Darmstadt on 11 March 1846
- Ellen Allen (died 1860), died in Bayswater on 15 December 1860

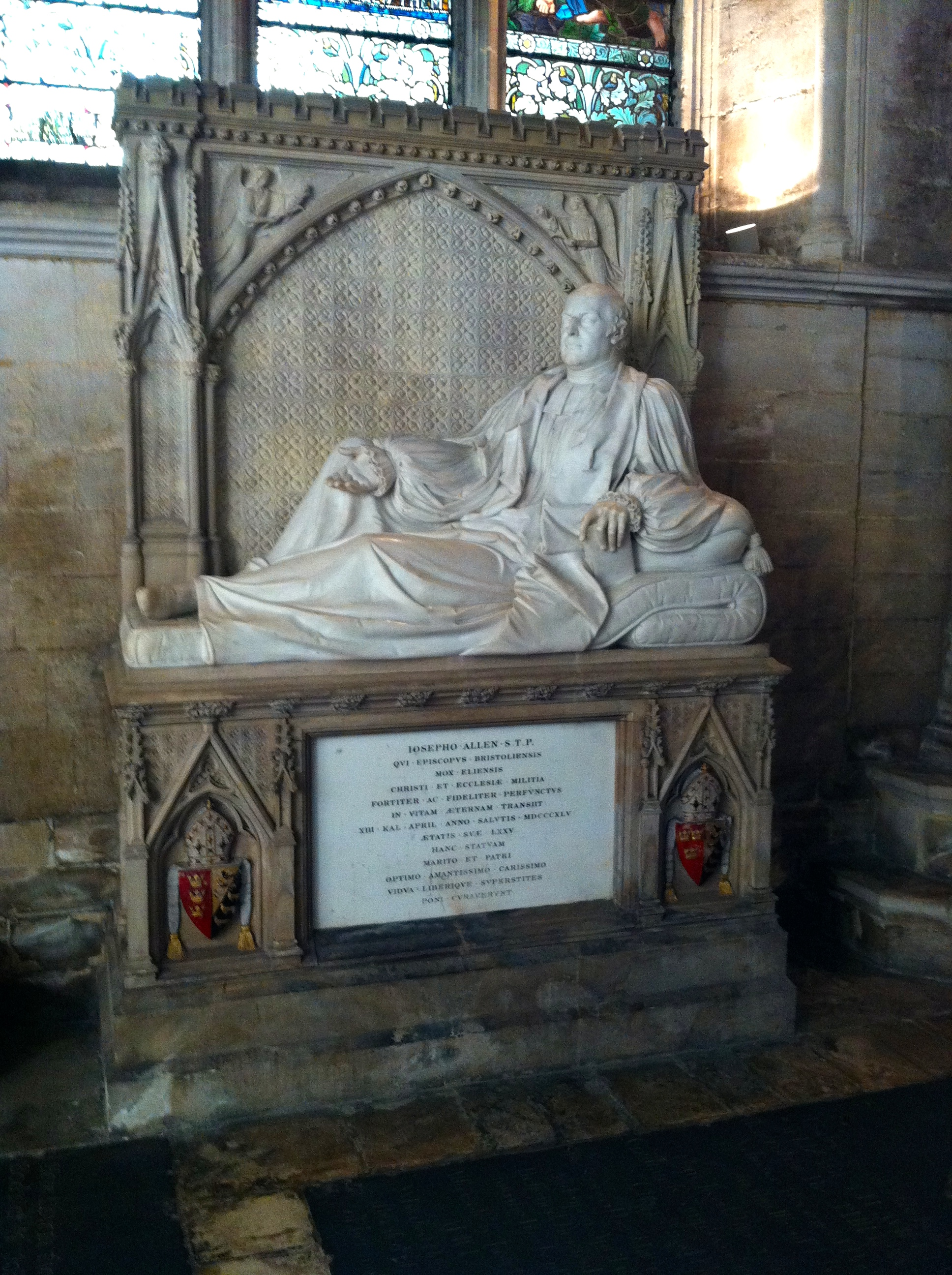
Memorial to Bishop Joseph Allen in Ely Cathedral

Church of England titles
Preceded by Robert Gray	Bishop of Bristol; 1834–1836	Succeeded by James Henry Monk as Bishop of Gloucester and Bristol
Preceded by Bowyer Sparke	Bishop of Ely; 1836–1845	Succeeded by Thomas Turton
