= William Allen (banker) =

English banker (born 1736)

William Allen (1736–1792) was an English banker who was a co-founder of the first bank to be opened in Manchester and was also the father of a future bishop.

== Early personal life ==
William Allen was the youngest of six sons. His mother died in 1742, when he was six years old, and he was raised by his father. When his father died, he was the sole surviving child and inherited his father's house and property. In 1760, he married the daughter of Tomas Clowes and, in 1765, bought Davyhulme Hall, near Urmston (now in Greater Manchester). A year later, his wife died, and in 1768, he married Ellen (Nellie) Livesey, the daughter of John Livesey, a Blackburn cotton mill owner. In 1770, their son, Joseph, the future bishop, was born. A daughter, Ellen, was born in 1774.

== Banking career ==
Allen was a co-founder of the bank of Byrom, Allen, Sedgwick, and Place, also known as the Manchester Bank, the first bank to be established in the city, which opened its doors on 2 December, 1771. Its other founders were Edward Byrom, Roger Sedgwick, and Edward Place. Place left the bank after a few months to take up other business interests. Byrom died in 1773 and Sedgwick in 1779, leaving Allen as the sole director. One of the bank's customers was the firm of Livesey, Hargreaves and Company. Allen's wife is one of the Livesey family, and Allen made large loans to the company. However, the company went bankrupt in 1788, with debts totaling £1.5 million (equivalent to £196,000,000 in 2021). Two days later, the bank itself collapsed, Allen was declared bankrupt, and he had to sell his property.

== Later family life ==
Allen and his family went to live with Robert Wainwright Ashley, an old friend, in their home at Park Place (now Castle Park House) in Frodsham, Cheshire, where he died four years later. In 1794, William's daughter, Ellen, married Wainwright's son, Daniel, and in 1807, Joseph married Wainwright's daughter, Margaret. Joseph had studied in Manchester, then at Trinity College, Cambridge. After serving as vicar to two London churches, he was appointed Bishop of Bristol in 1834, then Bishop of Ely two years later, remaining there until his death in 1845. William's wife, Ellen, had died in 1825. They were both buried in St. Laurence's Church, Frodsham, and there is a wall monument to their memory in the chancel of the church.
