= Thomas Calvert (professor) =

English Anglican priest (1775–1840)

The Very Reverend Thomas Calvert
- Warden of the Collegiate Church, Manchester
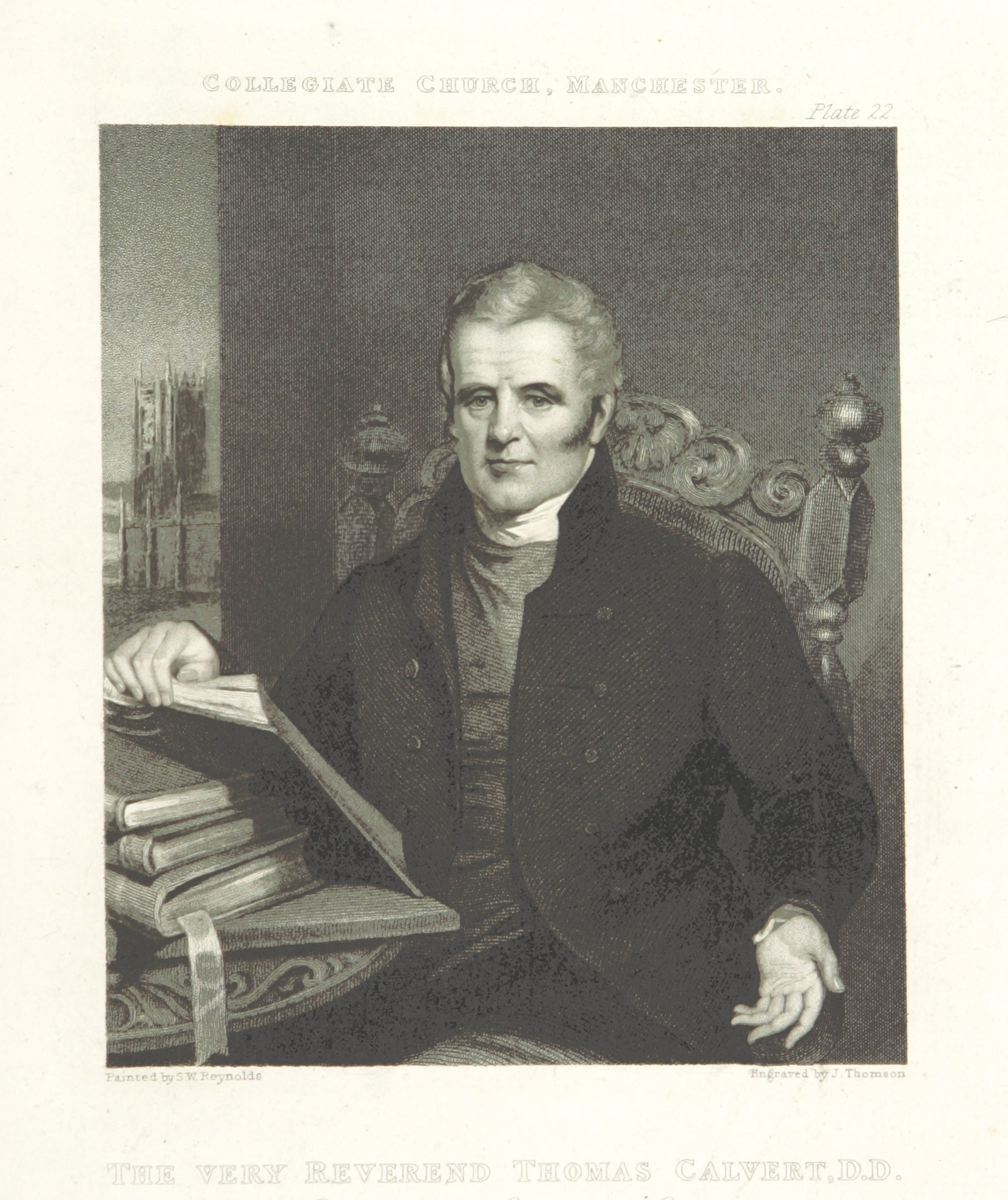
- Engraved portrait by J. Thomson after a painting by S. W. Reynolds (1834)

Orders
- Ordination: 1800

Personal details
- Born: 1775
- Died: 4 June 1840 (aged 64–65)
- Denomination: Anglican
- Children: 3, including Charles

Thomas Jackson Calvert (1775–1840) was an English Anglican priest and theologian. Calvert was born in 1775; educated at Kirkham Grammar School and St John's College, Cambridge; and ordained in 1800. He held incumbencies at Holme-on-Spalding-Moor and Manchester Collegiate Church. He was Norrisian Professor of Divinity from 1815 to 1824. He died on 4 June 1840.

== Life ==
He was born at Preston in 1775. His father, whose name was Jackson, sent him to Clitheroe Free Grammar School, of which the master was then the learned Rev. Thomas Wilson, BD. He entered St. John's College, Cambridge, and was fourth wrangler. He was BA in 1797, MA in 1800, BD in 1807, and DD in 1823. The last-named degree was taken in the name of Calvert, which he assumed on the death of a friend belonging to an old Lancashire family, who, although unconnected by blood, left him about 1819 a large fortune.

He was fellow of his college in 1798, tutor in 1814, and Norrisian Professor of Divinity from 1814 to 1824, in which year he resigned the post of Lady Margaret's preacher, which he had held since 1819. Having been appointed king's preacher at Whitehall, he attracted the attention and admiration of Lord Liverpool, who appointed him to the rectory of Wilmslow. Although the crown claimed the patronage, it was ultimately decided that the right vested in the ancient family of the Traffords of Trafford, who for more than two centuries had been Roman Catholics. Calvert had his consolation in the college living of Holme, Yorkshire, in 1822, and in the wardenship of the Collegiate Church of Manchester, conferred unsolicited on the recommendation of his admirer, Lord Liverpool. He was installed on 8 March 1823. He married Juliana, daughter of Sir Charles Watson of Wratting Park, Cambridgeshire, and had three sons, the oldest of whom, Charles Calvert, played cricket for Cambridge University and was later called to the bar.

Calvert was constitutionally diffident, and did not take much part in public affairs except in his opposition to Catholic emancipation. His serene manners and gentle deportment made him very popular. He died after a short illness in his house at Ardwick on 4 June 1840, and was followed to the grave by the whole body of the Manchester clergy.

== Works ==
He wrote:

1. The Disinterested and Benevolent Character of Christianity, a Sermon, Cambridge, 1819.
2. The Rich and Poor shown to be of God's appointment and equally the objects of His regard, two Sermons at Whitehall, Cambridge, 1820.
3. Christ's Presence a source of Consolation and Courage, a Sermon, London, 1823.
4. Help in Time of Need, a Sermon, London, 1826.
5. Infidelity Unmasked, a Sermon, Manchester, 1831.
6. An Established Church the best means of providing for the Care of a Christian Community, a Sermon, Manchester, 1834.
7. A Sermon preached before the Corporation of the Sons of the Clergy in St. Paul's Cathedral (1837).
8. On the Duty of Bridling the Tongue, a Sermon, 1840. This was written for a volume made up of contributions by thirty-nine divines towards a fund for St. Andrew's Schools, Manchester.

== Sources ==
- Axon, William Edward Armytage (1886). "Calvert, Thomas (1775-1840)" . In Stephen, Leslie (ed.). Dictionary of National Biography. Vol. 8. London: Smith, Elder & Co. p. 275.

Anglican Communion titles
Preceded by James Fawcett	Norrisian Professor of Divinity; 1824–1838	Succeeded by John Hollingworth
