= Robert Montgomery (poet) =

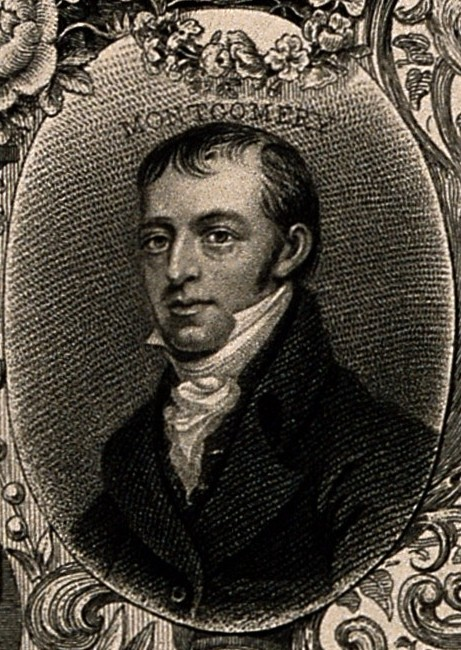
- Born: Robert Gomery; 1807; Bath, Somerset
- Died: 3 December 1855 (aged 47–48); Brighton
- Education: Lincoln College, Oxford (BA, MA)
- Spouse: Rachel Catherine Andrews MacKenzie (m. 1843)
- Children: Jessie Anne Douglas Montgomery
- Relatives: Rev Frederic Charles Cook (brother-in-law)
- Writing career
- Genres: Christian literature, Poetry, Satire
- Notable work: The Omnipresence of the Deity

Religious life
- Religion: Christianity
- Denomination: Church of England
- Ordination: 1835, St Asaph

Robert Montgomery (1807–1855) was an English poet and minister, the natural son of Robert Gomery (1778-1853), an actor and clown, and Elizabeth Medows Boyce, a schoolteacher.

Born in Bath, Somerset, it is unknown why Robert Jnr. was baptised with the surname Montgomery. He was educated at a private school in the city. Later, he founded an unsuccessful weekly paper in that city. In 1828 he published The Omni-presence of the Deity, which hit popular religious sentiment so exactly that it ran through eight editions in as many months. In 1830 he followed it with The Puffiad (a satire), and Satan, or Intellect without God. An exhaustive review in Blackwood's by John Wilson, followed in the thirty-first number by a burlesque of Satan, and two articles in the first volume of Fraser, ridiculed Montgomery's pretensions and the excesses of his admirers.

His name was immortalized by Macaulay's famous onslaught in the Edinburgh Review for April 1830, "an annihilating so Jove-like that the victim automatically commands the spectator's rueful sympathy." This review did not, however, diminish the sale of his poems; The Omni-presence of the Deity reached its 28th edition in 1858.

In 1830, Montgomery entered Lincoln College, Oxford, graduating B.A. in 1833 and M.A. in 1838. Taking holy orders in 1835, he obtained a curacy at Whittington, Shropshire, which he exchanged in 1836 for the charge of the church of St. Jude, Glasgow. In 1843, he moved to the parish of St Pancras, London, when he was minister of Percy Chapel.

== Family ==
On 7 October 1843, at St George's Hanover Square, London, Montgomery married Rachel Catherine Andrews MacKenzie (1814-82), the daughter of Alexander Douglas McKenzie (died 1842) of Bursledon, Hampshire. His brother-in-law was Rev Frederic Charles Cook (1804-1889).

He had a daughter:

- Jessie Anne Douglas Montgomery (1851-1918)

== Death ==
Robert Montgomery died in Brighton on 3 December 1855.

== List of works ==
- The Omni-presence of the Deity, (1828)
- The Puffiad, (1828)
- Satan, or Intellect without God, (1830)
- Oxford, (1831)
- The Messiah, (1832)
- Woman, the Angel of Life, (1833)
- God and Man: being outlines of religious and moral truth, according to Scripture and the church, (1850)
