= Divinity Faculty Library, Cambridge =

Library at the University of Cambridge

Coordinates: 52.2017627°N 0.1058087°E

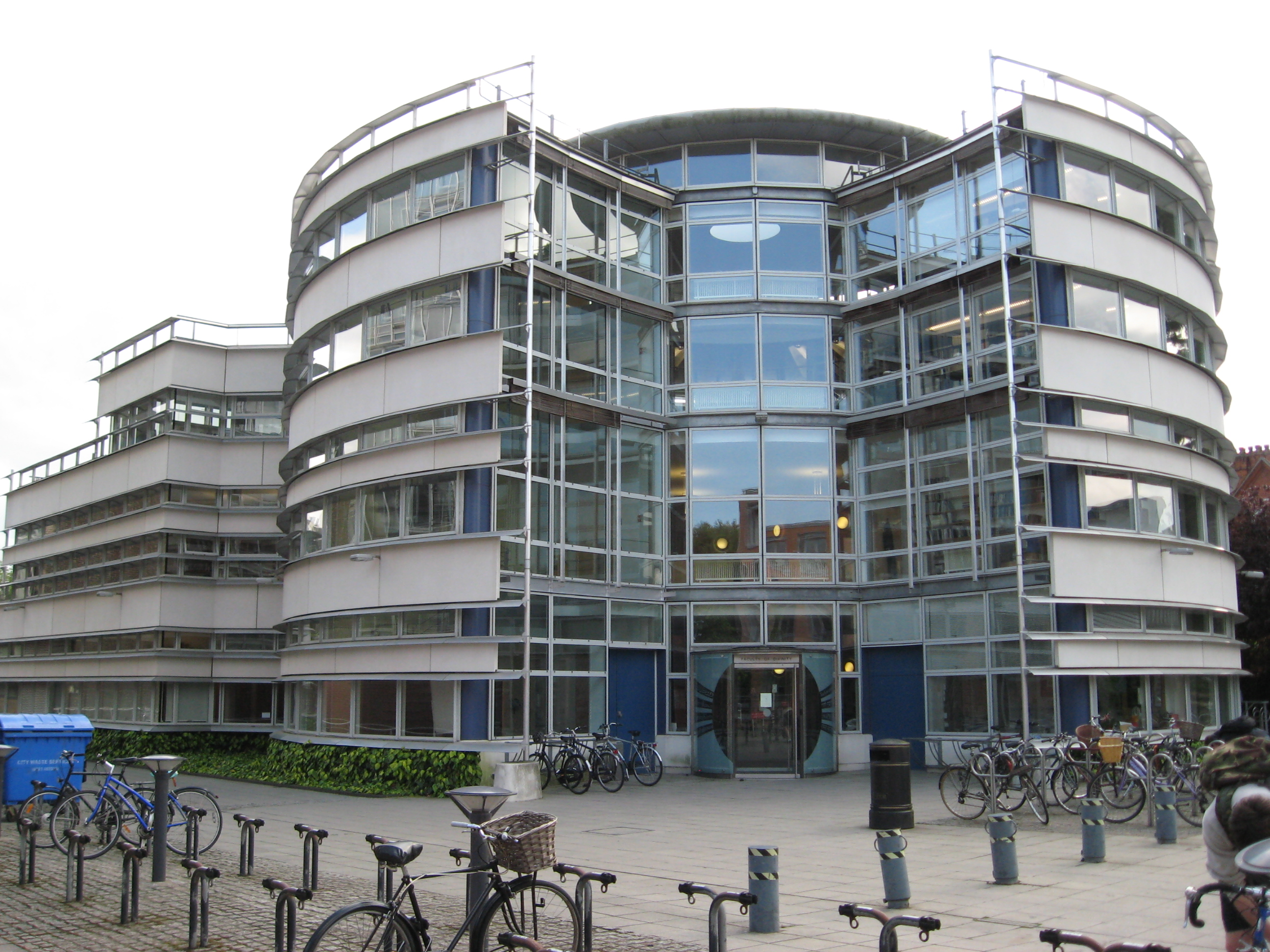

The Divinity Faculty Library, Cambridge, is the library for theology and religious studies at the University of Cambridge, England. It is housed within the Faculty of Divinity, University of Cambridge building on the Sidgwick Site off West Road, Cambridge. The library holds 59,000 volumes on its open shelves, and uses a bespoke classification system. The Library has particular strong holdings in Christian theology, biblical commentaries, church history and patristics. Perhaps, more surprisingly, also books on anthropology, sociology, politics, fiction and on sciences are held.

The library is open to current members of the University of Cambridge, and members of the Cambridge Theological Federation.
