= Byrom, Allen, Sedgwick and Place =

English bank

Byrom, Allen, Sedgwick and Place, also known as the Manchester Bank, was the first bank to be established in Manchester, England. It was founded on 2 December 1771 in Bank Street.

The founders were Edward Byrom, William Allen, Roger Sedgwick, and Edward Place. Place left the bank after a few months to take up other business interests. Byrom died in 1773, and Sedgwick in 1779, leaving Allen as the sole director. One of the bank's customers was the firm of Livesey, Hargreaves and Company; Allen was related to the Livesey family by marriage, and made large loans to the company. Livesey, Hargreaves and Company were the largest calico printers in Lancashire, and was "one of the largest cotton manufacturing enterprises in the early stages of the Industrial Revolution". They ran factories Preston, Lancashire, a mill at Clitheroe, a coal mine, and premises in Manchester and London. However the firm went bankrupt in 1788, with debts totalling £1.5 million (equivalent to £196,000,000 in 2025). Two days later the bank collapsed, Allen was also declared bankrupt. The business was acquired by Heywood's Bank.
