= Charles Swainson =

English Anglican theologian (1820–1887)

The Reverend Charles Swainson
- Born: Charles Anthony Swainson; 29 May 1820; Liverpool, England
- Died: 15 September 1887 (aged 67)
- Title: Master of Christ's College, Cambridge (1881–1887)

Ecclesiastical career
- Religion: Christianity (Anglican)
- Church: Church of England
- Ordained: 1843 (deacon); 1844 (priest)

Academic background
- Education: Trinity College, Cambridge

Academic work
- Discipline: Theology
- Institutions: Chichester Theological College; Christ's College, Cambridge

Charles Anthony Swainson (1820–1887) was an English Anglican theologian, Principal of Chichester Theological College, Norrisian Professor of Divinity, and subsequently Lady Margaret's Professor of Divinity, Master of Christ's College, Cambridge, and a canon of Chichester. His published works deal mainly with the Eastern liturgies and the creeds.

== Life ==
He was the second son of Anthony Swainson of Liverpool, a merchant and brother of Charles Swainson of Preston. He was educated at the Royal Institution of Liverpool's school, and matriculated at Trinity College, Cambridge, in 1837, graduating BA in 1841, MA in 1844, and DD in 1864.

== Works ==
- The Greek Liturgies Chiefly from Original Authorities (Cambridge, 1884)
- Several of his works have been reproduced by Project Canterbury (May 2013).

Academic offices
Preceded by	Principal of Chichester Theological College; 1854–1870	Succeeded by Arthur Rawson Ashwell
Preceded by Harvey Goodwin	Hulsean Lecturer; 1857–1858	Succeeded by Charles Ellicott
Preceded by Harold Browne	Norrisian Professor of Divinity; 1864–1879	Succeeded by J. Rawson Lumby
Preceded by J. B. Lightfoot	Lady Margaret's Professor of Divinity; 1879–1887	Succeeded by F. J. A. Hort
Preceded by James Cartmell	Master of Christ's College, Cambridge; 1881–1887	Succeeded by John Peile
Preceded by Norman Macleod Ferrers	Vice-Chancellor of the University of Cambridge; 1885	Succeeded by Charles Taylor
