= William Thomas Bullock =

William Thomas Bullock (1818–1879) was an English Anglican cleric and mission administrator.

== Life ==
He was the second son of John Bullock by Mary Soper, born in London. He entered Magdalen Hall, Oxford as a gentleman commoner, and took his B.A. degree in 1847, obtaining a fourth class in Literae Humaniores. The same year he was ordained deacon, and licensed to the curacy of St Anne's, Soho. Here he worked until June 1850, when he was appointed assistant secretary to the Society for the Propagation of the Gospel (SPG).

On the death of Ernest Hawkins in 1865, Bullock succeeded him as chief secretary of the SPG, a post he held for the rest of his life. In 1867 he was appointed chaplain to the royal household in Kensington Palace, where he occupied the chaplain's apartments. In 1875 Bullock was presented to a prebendal stall of St. Paul's Cathedral.

Bullock worked to expand the operations of the SPG. He saw 42 new sees added to the colonial episcopate, while church operations were extended beyond the British Empire, by the appointment of missionary bishops in the Niger territory, Honolulu, Ningbo, Madagascar, Central Africa, and Melanesia. Missions were opened in new countries: independent Burma, China, and Japan. At the same time the income of the society increased. It was at Bullock's instigation that the society undertook the publication of The Missionary Record, The Gospel Missionary, and The Mission Field, which were run under his supervision.

In 1878 Bullock took part in the arrangements for the Pan-Anglican synod, but at the end of the year his health forced him take leave. He died at Mentone of paralysis on 27 February 1879. He had married in 1862 Alice Oke Alford, elder daughter of Henry Alford, by whom he left two daughters.

== Works ==
Bullock was the author of about 70 articles in Smith's Dictionary of the Bible, and wrote on the Book of Ecclesiastes in the Speaker's Commentary. In 1878 he published a sermon Builders of the Temple preached at the consecration of the Bishop of Newfoundland. After his death a volume of sermons, edited by his widow, was published, most of them preached at Kensington Palace Chapel.

== Notes ==
Attribution

This article incorporates text from a publication now in the public domain: Stephen, Leslie, ed. (1886). "Bullock, William Thomas". Dictionary of National Biography. Vol. 7. London: Smith, Elder & Co.
