= J. Rawson Lumby =

English Anglican priest and scholar (1831–1895)

Joseph Rawson Lumby (1831–1895) was an English cleric, academic and author and divine, Norrisian Professor of Divinity from 1879 and then Lady Margaret's Professor of Divinity from 1892.

== Life ==
He was the son of John Lumby of Stanningley, near Leeds, where he was born on 18 July 1831. He was admitted on 2 August 1841 to Leeds Grammar School. In March 1848 he left to become master of a school at Meanwood; but he was encouraged to proceed to the university. In October 1854 he entered Magdalene College, Cambridge, where in the following year he was elected to a Milner close scholarship. In 1858 he graduated B.A., being bracketed ninth in the first class of the classical tripos. His subsequent degrees were M.A. 1861, B.D. 1873, D.D. 1879.

Within a few months of graduation Lumby was made Dennis Fellow of his college, and began to take pupils. In 1860 he gained the Crosse scholarship, and in the same year was ordained deacon and priest in the diocese of Ely. For clerical work he had the chaplaincy of Magdalene and the curacy of Girton. In 1861 he won the Tyrwhitt Hebrew scholarship, and was appointed classical lecturer at Queens' College. In 1873 he joined the Old Testament Revision Company, and he worked also on the revision of the Apocrypha (he just lived to see the appearance of the revised version).

In 1874, a widower through the death of his first wife, Lumby was chosen Fellow and Dean of St Catharine's College, and, having resigned his curacy at Girton, was made curate of St Mark's, Newnham. The following year he was appointed, on the nomination of Trinity Hall, to the vicarage (non-stipendiary) of St Edward's, Cambridge. In 1879 he was elected to the Norrisian professorship of divinity, and was also Lady Margaret preacher for that year.

Having vacated his fellowship at St Catharine's by a second marriage, Lumby was appointed to a professorial fellowship in that college in 1886. In 1887 he was made prebendary of Wetwang in the York Cathedral, and acted as examining chaplain to the archbishop of York and the bishop of Carlisle. On the death of Fenton John Anthony Hort in 1892, he was chosen to succeed him as Lady Margaret professor of divinity.

Lumby died at Merton House, Grantchester, near Cambridge, on 21 November 1895.

== Works ==
Lumby was one of the founders of the Early English Text Society, and edited for it King Horn (1866), Ratis Raving (1867), and other pieces. For the Rolls series, after a request by the Master of the Rolls to continue the work of Churchill Babington, he edited vols. iii–ix. of Ranulph Higden's Polychronicon (1871–86), and vol. i. of the Chronicon of Henry Knighton (1889). To the Pitt Press series he contributed editions of Francis Bacon's Henry VII (1876), Venerabilis Bædæ Historiæ … Libri iii. iv. (with John E. B. Mayor, 1878), Thomas More's Utopia, in Ralph Robynson's English translation (1879), More's History of Richard III (1883), and Abraham Cowley's Essays (1887).

As co-editor of the Cambridge Bible for Schools, he edited, with commentary, The Acts (chaps. i–xiv., 1879; completed 1884), 1 Kings (1886), 2 Kings (1887), The Acts in the Cambridge Greek Testament for Schools (1885), also in The Smaller Cambridge Bible for Schools (1889), and for this last series 1 Kings (1891). To the Sunday School Centenary Bible he contributed a Glossary of Bible Words (1880), republished in the same year in another version by the Society for the Promotion of Christian Knowledge. For the Speaker's Commentary he edited 2 Peter and Jude (1881); for A Popular Commentary the Epistles to the Philippians and Philemon (1882); and for The Expositor's Bible the two Epistles of St. Peter (1893).

Lumby wrote also:

- the chapter on The Ordinary Degree in John Robert Seeley's Guide (1866),
- Three Sermons on Early Dissent, &c. (1870),
- A History of the Creeds (1873),
- A Sketch of a Course of English Reading (1873),
- Hear the Church (1877),
- Greek Learning in the Western Church (a pamphlet, 1878), preface to a Compendium of Church History (1883),
- A Popular Introduction to the New Testament (1883), and
- articles in the Cambridge Companion to the Bible (1893).

He was a contributor to the ninth edition of the Encyclopædia Britannica.

== See also ==
- Knighton's Chronicon
