= George Corrie (priest) =

English churchman and academic

George Elwes Corrie (28 April 1793 – 20 September 1885) was an English churchman and academic, Master of Jesus College, Cambridge from 1849.

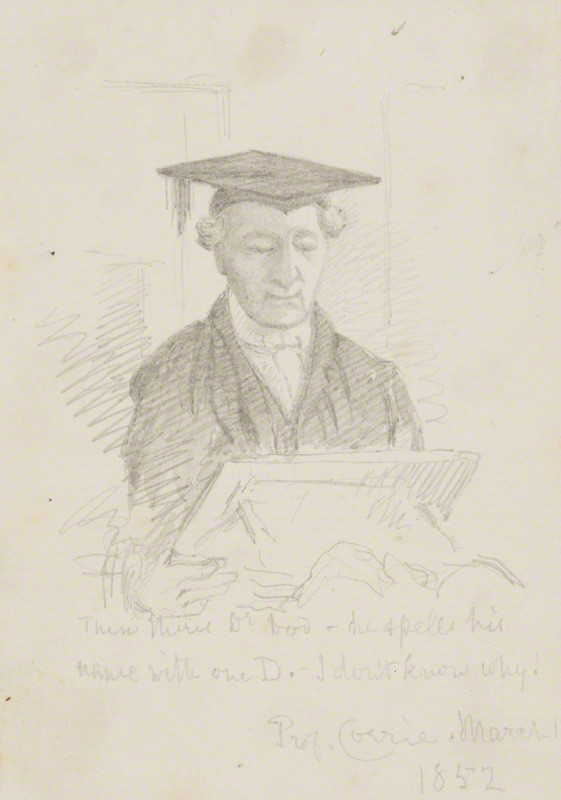
George Elwes Corrie, 1852 drawing

== Life ==
He was born at Colsterworth, Lincolnshire, on 28 April 1793, where his father John Corrie, who became vicar of Morcott, was then curate; his mother was Anne MacNab. He was the youngest of three sons, the eldest being Daniel Corrie, and the second Richard Corrie, M.D., who became rector of Kettering. They were all educated by their father. In October 1813 Corrie entered Catharine Hall, Cambridge. He graduated B.A. in 1817, and took orders. In 1817 he became assistant tutor of his college, and on the resignation of Thomas Turton, succeeded to the tutorship, which he held till 1849.

In 1838 Corrie was appointed Norrisian professor of divinity. In 1854 he had to resign his professorship, on attaining the age of 60. He was a leader of the conservative party at Cambridge. In 1845 Turton, on becoming bishop of Ely, made Corrie his examining chaplain (a post he held till 1864), and in 1849 presented him to the mastership of Jesus College. He was vice-chancellor of the university in 1850. In 1851 Turton presented him to the rectory of Newton-in-the-Isle, where he resided when not engaged in university work. He was an active parish priest, and for many years rural dean. As master of Jesus, Corrie improved the college's reputation, and took a major part in the management of its estates.

Corrie was one of the founders and for several years president of the Cambridge Antiquarian Society. He died 20 September 1885.

== Works ==
Corrie wrote Historical Notices of the Interference of the Crown with the English Universities, A Concise History of the Church and State of England in conflict with the Papacy (1874); and a series of five letters in the British Magazine criticising Thomas Moore's History of Ireland, dealing mainly with the doctrines of the Irish church on Pelagianism.

Corrie edited the Homilies, Charles Wheatly's work on the Book of Common Prayer, and Roger Twysden's Historical Vindication of the Church of England for the Cambridge University Press; and Alexander Nowell's Catechism and Hugh Latimer's Sermons and Remains for the Parker Society. He published an abridgment of Gilbert Burnet's History of the Reformation, and, with Hugh James Rose, wrote "Outlines of Theology' for the Encyclopædia Metropolitana. With his brother Richard he edited the Life and Letters of Bishop Daniel Corrie.

== Notes ==
Attribution

This article incorporates text from a publication now in the public domain: Stephen, Leslie, ed. (1887). "Corrie, George Elwes". Dictionary of National Biography. Vol. 12. London: Smith, Elder & Co.
