= Thomas Turton =

English academic and divine

The Right Reverend Thomas Turton
- Bishop of Ely
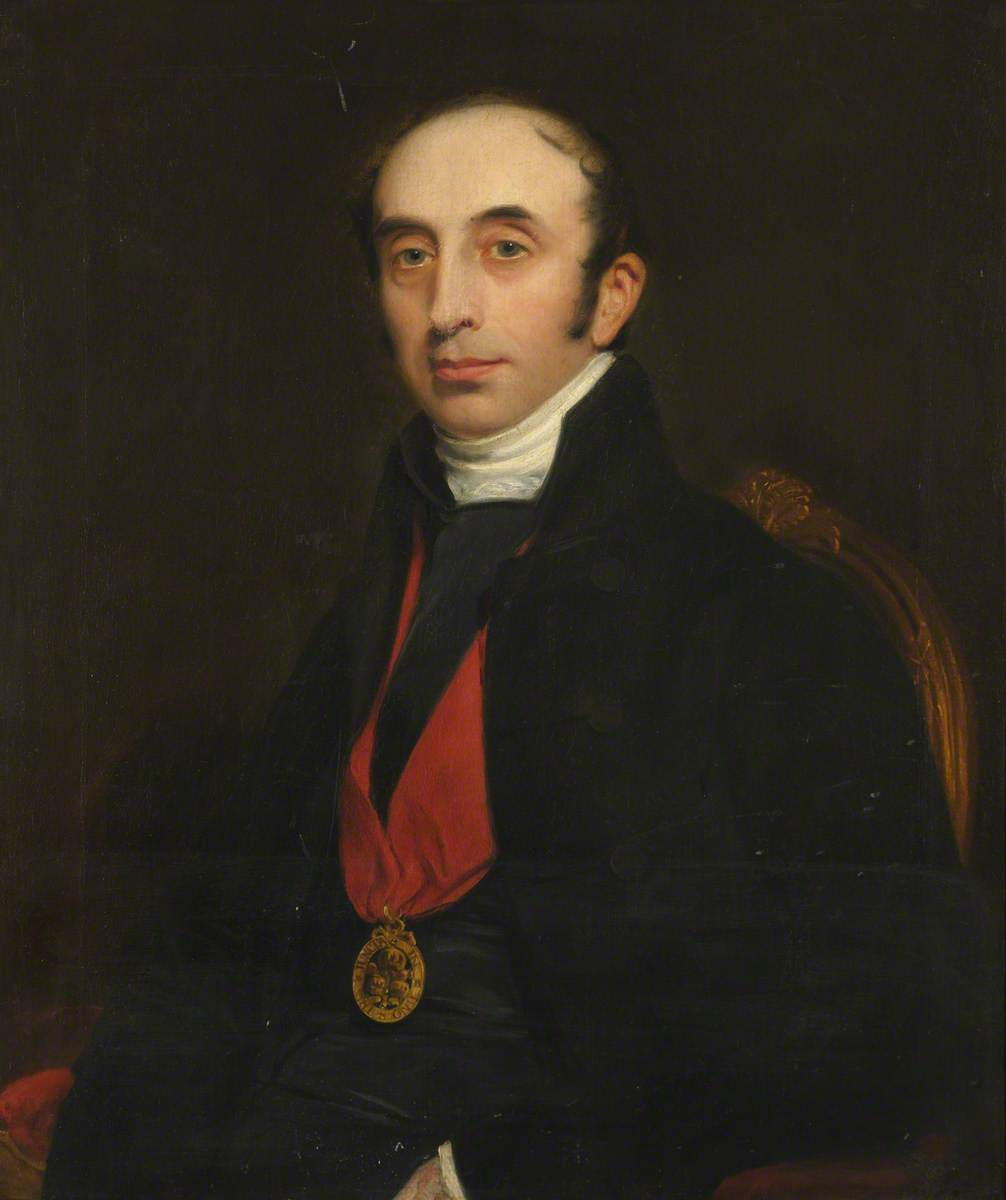
- Thomas Turton by Henry William Pickersgill
- Diocese: Ely
- In office: 1845–1864
- Predecessor: Joseph Allen
- Successor: Harold Browne
- Other posts: Dean of Peterborough (1830–1842); Dean of Westminster (1842–1845)

Personal details
- Born: 25 February 1780 Hatfield, West Riding of Yorkshire, England
- Died: 7 January 1864 (aged 83) Ely House, Dover Street, London, England
- Buried: Kensal Green Cemetery
- Denomination: Anglican
- Education: Queens' College, Cambridge; St Catharine's College, Cambridge

Thomas Turton (25 February 1780 – 7 January 1864) was an English academic and divine, the Bishop of Ely from 1845 to 1864.

== Life ==
Thomas Turton was son of Thomas and Ann Turton of Hatfield, West Riding. He was admitted to Queens' College, Cambridge, in 1801 but migrated to St Catharine's College in 1804. In 1805 he graduated BA as senior wrangler and equal Smith's Prizeman. Elected a fellow of St Catharine's in 1806, he was Lucasian Professor of Mathematics from 1822 to 1826 and Regius Professor of Divinity from 1827 to 1842.

After various other clerical appointments, Turton was Dean of Peterborough from 1830 to 1842, Dean of Westminster from 1842 to 1845 and Bishop of Ely from 1845 to 1864. He wrote the tune "Ely" to the office hymn 'O God, thy loving care for man' (New English Hymnal 221).

He is buried at Kensal Green Cemetery.

== Works ==
- 1834: Thoughts on the Admission of Persons without Regard to their Religious Opinions to Certain Degrees in the Universities of England, Cambridge: The Pitt Press
- The Text of the English Bible
- The Roman Catholic doctrine of the Eucharist considered

== Sources ==
- Frost, Maurice, ed. (1962). Historical Companion to Hymns Ancient & Modern. London: William Clowes & Sons Ltd.
- Robert Bruen (2008). "Lucasian Chair: Thomas Turton". Lucasian Chair.org.

Academic offices
Preceded by Robert Woodhouse	Lucasian Professor of Mathematics at Cambridge; 1822–1826	Succeeded by George Biddell Airy
Preceded by John Kaye	Regius Professor of Divinity at Cambridge; 1827–1842	Succeeded by Alfred Ollivant
Church of England titles
Preceded by James Henry Monk	Dean of Peterborough; 1830–1842	Succeeded by George Butler
Preceded by John Ireland	Dean of Westminster; 1842–1845	Succeeded by Samuel Wilberforce
Preceded by Joseph Allen	Bishop of Ely; 1845–1864	Succeeded by Harold Browne
