= Norris–Hulse Professor of Divinity =

Senior professorship in divinity at the University of Cambridge

The Norris–Hulse Professorship of Divinity is one of the senior professorships in divinity at the University of Cambridge.

== History ==
The Norrisian chair was founded in 1777 by a bequest from John Norris. Among the original stipulations of the bequest were that the holder should be between 30 and 60 years old, and that he should be fined 21 shillings from his salary if any student at his lectures were not provided with copies of the Old and New Testaments, and a Pearson on the Creed.

John Hulse (1708–1790) was an English clergyman from Middlewich, Cheshire. On his death, he bequeathed a large proportion of his estate to found a prize essay, two scholarships, and the positions of 'Hulsean Lecturer' and 'Christian Advocate'. The Hulsean Lecturer was originally required to deliver 20 sermons each year on the evidence of Christianity or scriptural difficulties, and the position continues to this day, although the number of lectures has been reduced greatly. In 1860 the Christian Advocate became the 'Hulsean Professor of Divinity'.

In 1934 the Norrisian and Hulsean Professorships were merged to form the Norris–Hulse Professorship. The expertise of the incumbent is generally expected to include philosophical theology, although the post does not formally require this.

In 2005 the Norris–Hulse professorship was frozen by the University of Cambridge. Then on 18 October 2006, the university announced the election of Sarah Coakley to the position. Upon the retirement of Professor Coakley, the university conducted an international search that resulted in the appointment of Catherine Pickstock to the position in March 2018.

== Norrisian Professors ==
- John Hey (1780)
- James Fawcett (1795)
- Thomas Jackson Calvert (1815)
- John Banks Hollingworth (1824)
- George Elwes Corrie (1838)
- Edward Harold Browne (1854)
- Charles Anthony Swainson (1864)
- Joseph Rawson Lumby (1879)
- Joseph Armitage Robinson (1893)
- Handley Carr Glyn Moule (1899)
- Frederick Henry Chase (1901)
- Francis Crawford Burkitt (1905)

== Hulsean Professors ==
- Charles John Ellicott (1860)
- Joseph Barber Lightfoot (1861)
- John James Stewart Perowne (1875)
- Fenton John Anthony Hort (1878)
- Herbert Edward Ryle (1887)
- William Emery Barnes (1901)

== Norris–Hulse Professors ==
- Francis Crawford Burkitt (1934)
- Charles Harold Dodd (1935)
- Herbert Henry Farmer (1949)
- Donald MacKenzie MacKinnon (1960)
- Nicholas Langrishe Alleyne Lash (1978)
- Denys Alan Turner (1999)
- Sarah Anne Coakley (2007)
- Catherine Pickstock (2018)
