= Graham Stanton =

New Zealand theologian (1940–2009)

- Born: 9 July 1940; Christchurch, Canterbury Region
- Died: 18 July 2009 (aged 69); Cambridge, England
- Title: Lady Margaret's Professor of Divinity
- Spouse: Valerie Douglas (m. 1965)

Academic background
- Education: Knox College, Otago; Westminster College, Cambridge
- Thesis: The Primitive Preaching and Jesus of Nazareth (1969)
- Doctoral advisor: C. F. D. Moule

Academic work
- Discipline: Biblical studies
- Sub-discipline: New Testament studies
- Institutions: King's College, London; Fitzwilliam College, Cambridge
- Main interests: Epistle to the Galatians; Gospel of Matthew; Justin Martyr
- Notable works: The Gospels and Jesus (1989); Gospel Truth? (1995)

Graham Norman Stanton (9 July 1940 – 18 July 2009) was a New Zealand biblical scholar who taught at King's College, London, and as Lady Margaret's Professor of Divinity at the University of Cambridge. A New Testament specialist, Stanton's special interests were in the Gospels, with a particular focus on Matthew's Gospel; Paul's letters, with a particular focus on Galatians; and second-century Christian writings, with a particular interest in Justin Martyr.

== Biography ==
Stanton was born on 9 July 1940 in Christchurch, New Zealand. He came to Cambridge in 1966 to study under C. F. D. Moule (at Westminster College and as a member of Fitzwilliam College), his dissertation was completed in 1969 and published in 1974. From 1970 to 1998, he served as lecturer and (from 1977) as Professor of New Testament at King's College, London. In 1998, he returned to Cambridge as Lady Margaret's Professor and as a Fellow at Fitzwilliam College.

From 1996–1997, Stanton was the President of the Studiorum Novi Testamenti Societas, a society of New Testament scholars. In 1982–1990), he was editor of the journal New Testament Studies and of the associated monograph series (1982–1991) and was a General Editor of the International Critical Commentaries (1984–2009).

Among other honours, Stanton was awarded an honorary Doctor of Divinity degree from the University of Otago in 2000; in 2005, he was honoured with a Festschrift to mark his 65th birthday. The Written Gospel (eds. M. Bockmuehl and D. Hagner, Cambridge University Press) includes a bibliography of Stanton's books and articles until 2005 (9 authored books, 6 edited books, 60 authored articles or chapters). In 2006 he was awarded the Burkitt Medal by the British Academy for his contribution to biblical studies in the United Kingdom.

Stanton died on 18 July 2009 in Cambridge. In 2011, a collection of essays discussing various aspects of Stanton's work was published in his memory.

== Criticism of Christ myth theory ==
Stanton criticised the arguments of Christ myth theorists. In his book The Gospels and Jesus, he wrote:

Today, nearly all historians, whether Christians or not, accept that Jesus existed and that the gospels contain plenty of valuable evidence which has to be weighed and assessed critically. There is general agreement that, with the possible exception of Paul, we know far more about Jesus of Nazareth than about any first or second century Jewish or pagan religious teacher.

== Works ==
=== Books ===
- Stanton, Graham N. (1974). Jesus of Nazareth in New Testament Preaching. Society of New Testament Studies: Monograph Supplement. Vol. 27. Cambridge: Cambridge University Press. ISBN 9780521204651. OCLC 1166777.
- ——— (1989). The Gospels and Jesus. Oxford Bible Series. Oxford: Oxford University Press. ISBN 9780191586385. OCLC 43477458.
- ——— (1992). A Gospel for a New People: Studies in Matthew. Edinburgh: T&T Clark. ISBN 9780567095350. OCLC 21596331.
- ——— (1995). Gospel Truth?: new light on Jesus and the Gospels. London: HarperCollins. ISBN 9780006279631. OCLC 246873785.
- ——— (2004). Jesus and Gospel. Cambridge, UK: Cambridge University Press. ISBN 9780521810326. OCLC 475052307.
- ——— (2013). Bockmuehl, Markus; Lincicum, David (eds.). Studies in Matthew and Early Christianity. Wissenschaftliche Untersuchungen zum Neuen Testament. Vol. 309. Tubingen, Germany: Mohr Siebeck. ISBN 9783161525438. OCLC 854556985.

=== Edited works ===
- ———, ed. (1983). The Interpretation of Matthew. Issues in Religion and Theology. Vol. 3. Philadelphia, PA & London: Fortress Press & SPCK. ISBN 9780800617660. OCLC 925006154.
- ———; Collinson, Patrick; Rex, Richard, eds. (1996). The Dictionary of the Bible. Oxford: Oxford University Press. ISBN 9780192116918. OCLC 34471717.
- ———; Stroumsa, Guy G., eds. (1998). Tolerance and Intolerance in Early Judaism and Christianity. Cambridge: Cambridge University Press. ISBN 9780521590372. OCLC 36017291.
- ———; Collinson, Patrick; Rex, Richard, eds. (2003). Lady Margaret Beaufort and her Professors of Divinity at Cambridge: 1502 to 1649. Cambridge: Cambridge University Press. ISBN 9780521533102. OCLC 51336723.
- ———; Ford, David F., eds. (2003). Reading Texts, Seeking Wisdom: scripture and theology. London: SCM Press. ISBN 9780802827630. OCLC 54817117.
- ———; Dunn, James D. G.; Longenecker, Bruce W.; Barton, Stephen C., eds. (2004). The Holy Spirit And Christian Origins: Essays in Honor of James. Wm. B. Eerdmans. ISBN 9780802828224. OCLC 56198878.

=== Articles and chapters ===
- ——— (January 1995). "Matthew's Gospel: A Survey of Some Recent Commentaries". Bible Translator. 46 (1): 131–140. doi:10.1177/026009359504600106. S2CID 165007415.

== Festscrift ==
- Gurtner, Daniel M.; Willits, Joel; Burridge, Richard A., eds. (2011). Jesus, Matthew's gospel and early Christianity: studies in memory of Graham N. Stanton. Library of New Testament Studies. Vol. 435. London: T&T Clark. ISBN 9780567500854. OCLC 707329166.

Academic offices
Preceded by Morna Hooker	Lady Margaret's Professor of Divinity; 1998–2007	Succeeded by Judith Lieu
Professional and academic associations
Preceded by Albert Vanhoye	President of the Studiorum; Novi Testamenti Societas; 1996	Succeeded by Ulrich Luz
Awards
Preceded by Pierre-Maurice Bogaert	Burkitt Medal; 2006	Succeeded by Alberto Soggin
