= Studiorum Novi Testamenti Societas =

International society of New Testament scholars

The Studiorum Novi Testamenti Societas (SNTS) is an international society of New Testament scholars. The current president is Adele Reinhartz. The SNTS publishes the academic journal New Testament Studies.

== Presidents ==
Since 1947, the SNTS' presidents have been:

Year	President
1947	Johannes De Zwaan
1948	G. S. Duncan
1949	T. W. Manson
1950	Henri Clavier
1951	C. H. Dodd
1952	W. Manson
1953	Rudolf Bultmann
1954	V. Taylor
1955	Joachim Jeremias
1956	E. G. Selwyn
1957	H. G. Wood
1958	H. J. Cadbury
1959	Johannes Munck
1960	G. H. C. Macgregor
1961	W. C. van Unnik
1962	Pierre Benoit
1963	W. G. Kümmel
1964	Oscar Cullmann
1965	Paul S. Minear
1966	Rudolf Schnackenburg
1967	C. F. D. Moule
1968	Harald Riesenfeld
1969	Eduard Schweizer
1970	M. Black
1971	B. M. Metzger
1972	Ernst Käsemann
1973	C. K. Barrett
1974	Béda Rigaux
1975	F. F. Bruce
1976	W. D. Davies
1977	Günther Bornkamm
1978	N. Dahl
1979	H. Greeven
1980	Xavier Léon-Dufour
1981	R. McL. Wilson
1982	Bo Reicke
1983	Reginald H. Fuller
1984	J. Dupont
1985	Marinus de Jonge
1986	Raymond E. Brown
1987	E. Lohse
1988	Morna Hooker
1989	Frans Neirynck
1990	Birger Gerhardsson
1991	Étienne Trocmé
1992	Joseph Fitzmyer
1993	Martin Hengel
1994	Petr Pokorný
1995	Albert Vanhoye
1996	Graham Stanton
1997	Ulrich Luz
1998	Peder Borgen
1999	H. D. Betz
2000	François Bovon
2001	Tjitze Baarda
2002	J. D. G. Dunn
2003	Hans-Josef Klauck
2004	Wayne A. Meeks
2005	Barbara Aland
2006	Sean Freyne
2007	Daniel Marguerat
2008	A. B. du Toit
2009	Andreas Lindemann
2010	Adela Yarbro Collins
2011	A. Puig i Tàrrach
2012	H. J. de Jonge
2013	Christopher M. Tuckett
2014	Udo Schnelle
2015	Judith Lieu
2016	Carl Holladay
2017	Michael Wolter
2018	Jean Zumstein
2019	John Kloppenborg
2020	(because of COVID-19, no new president was appointed)
2021	Margaret M. Mitchell
2022	John Barclay
2023	Joseph Verheyden
2024	Angela Standhartiger
2025	Cilliers Breytenbach
2026	Adele Reinhartz
