= Burkitt Medal =

Medal awarded by the British Academy

The Burkitt Medal is awarded annually by the British Academy "in recognition of special service to Biblical Studies". Awards alternate between Hebrew Bible studies (odd years) and New Testament studies (even years). It was established in 1923 and has been awarded to many notable theologians. It is named in honour of Francis Crawford Burkitt.

== List of recipients ==
The first recipient of the Burkitt medal was R. H. Charles (1925). Below is a full list of recipients:

=== 1925–1999 ===
- 1925 The Ven. Archdeacon R. H. Charles
- 1926 Professor F. C. Burkitt
- 1927 The Rev. Canon B. H. Streeter
- 1928 Professor J. H. Ropes
- 1929 The Rev. Professor M.-J. Lagrange, OP
- 1930 Dr. C. G. Montefiore
- 1931 No Award
- 1932 Professor Alexander Souter
- 1933 No Award
- 1934 Sir Frederic G. Kenyon
- 1935 No Award
- 1936 Professor Kirsopp Lake
- 1937 No Award
- 1938 The Rev. Dr. W. O. E. Oesterley
- 1939 The Rev. Dr. A. E. Brooke and Dr. Norman Mclean
- 1940 The Rev. L. Hugues Vincent, OSD
- 1941 The Rev. S. C. E. Legg
- 1942 No Award
- 1943 Professor S. A. Cook
- 1944 The Rev. Dr. H. Wheeler Robinson
- 1945 The Rev. Professor C. H. Dodd
- 1946 Professor Theodore Henry Robinson
- 1947 The Rev. Dr. W. F. Howard
- 1948 Professor S. H. Hooke
- 1949 Professor Sigmund Mowinckel
- 1950 The Rev. Professor T. W. Manson
- 1951 The Rev. Professor H. H. Rowley
- 1952 Professor Anton Fridrichsen
- 1953 Sir Godfrey R. Driver
- 1954 Professor P. E. Kahle and Professor Ludwig Koehler
- 1955 Professor Walther Bauer
- 1956 Professor Oscar Cullmann
- 1957 The Rev. Roland de Vaux, OP
- 1958 Professor Joachim Jeremias
- 1959 Charles Virolleaud
- 1960 The Rev. Dr. Vincent Taylor
- 1961 The Rev. Professor A. R. Johnson
- 1962 The Rev. Professor Matthew Black
- 1963 Professor Walther Eichrodt
- 1964 Professor W. D. Davies
- 1965 Professor Otto Eissfeldt
- 1966 Professor C. K. Barrett
- 1967 Professor Martin Noth
- 1968 The Rev. Professor P. Benoit, OP
- 1969 Professor D. Winton Thomas
- 1970 The Rev. Professor C. F. D. Moule
- 1971 Professor Ernst Kasemann
- 1972 Professor W. Zimmerli
- 1973 Professor W. G. Kummel
- 1974 Professor C. J. Lindblom
- 1975 Professor K. Aland
- 1976 Professor E. H. Riesenfeld
- 1977 Professor D. C. Westermann
- 1978 Professor H. F. D. Sparks
- 1979 Professor F. F. Bruce
- 1980 Professor P. A. H. De Boer
- 1981 Professor G. B. Caird
- 1982 Professor G. W. Anderson
- 1983 Dom Bonifatius Fischer, OSB
- 1984 The Rev. Professor J. A. Fitzmyer, SJ
- 1985 Professor W. Mckane
- 1986 Professor M. Hengel
- 1987 Professor Dr R. Schnackenburg
- 1988 Professor James Barr
- 1989 Professor C. E. B. Cranfield
- 1990 Professor R. M. Wilson
- 1991 Professor J. A. Emerton
- 1992 Dr Ernst Bammel
- 1993 Professor Otto Kaiser
- 1994 Professor B. M. Metzger
- 1995 Professor Dr A. S. Van Der Woude
- 1996 Professor Dr E. Schweizer
- 1997 Professor R. N. Whybray
- 1998 Rev. Dr Margaret Thrall
- 1999 Professor Brevard S. Childs

=== 2000s ===
Year	Recipient	Area of study
2000	Hans Dieter Betz	New Testament
2001	Rudolf Smend	Hebrew Bible
2002	Gerd Theissen	New Testament
2003	Bertil Albrektson	Hebrew Bible
2004	Morna Hooker	New Testament
2005	Pierre-Maurice Bogaert OSB	Hebrew Bible
2006	Graham Stanton	New Testament
2007	Alberto Soggin	Hebrew Bible
2008	Richard Bauckham	New Testament
2009	Ernest Nicholson	Hebrew Bible

=== 2010s ===
Year	Recipient	Area of study	Citation
2010	Ulrich Luz	New Testament	
2011	Andrew Mayes	Hebrew Bible	
2012	Christopher Tuckett	New Testament	
2013	R. E. Clements	Hebrew Bible	
2014	N. T. Wright	New Testament	
2015	David J. A. Clines	Hebrew Bible	"in recognition of his significant contribution to the study of the Hebrew Bible and Hebrew lexicography"
2016	Barbara Aland	New Testament	"for her significant contribution to New Testament textual research"
2017	Takamitsu Muraoka	Hebrew Bible	"for his outstanding contribution to the study of Hebrew grammar and syntax, and the Septuagint"
2018	Rev. Professor Christopher Charles Rowland	New Testament	"for his wide-ranging contribution to New Testament studies."
2019	Professor John J. Collins	Old Testament	

=== 2020s ===
Year	Recipient	Area of study	Citation
2020	Professor Beverly Gaventa	New Testament	"for her long and distinguished contribution to New Testament scholarship"
2021	Professor Rainer Albertz	Hebrew Bible	"for enduring contributions to the field"
2022	Emeritus Professor Richard B. Hays	New Testament	"for his internationally recognized and influential work on the Gospels, the letters of Paul, and New Testament ethics"
2023	Professor Sara Japhet	Hebrew Bible	"for her pioneering contribution to the study of post-exilic Hebrew literature, particularly the books of Chronicles and Ezra-Nehemiah"
2024	Professor George J. Brooke	New Testament	"I am greatly surprised and honoured to be awarded the British Academy’s Burkitt Medal for 2024. It is a great joy to me that those who nominated me and who ratified the nomination have so strongly affirmed that an academic career spent mostly with the Dead Sea Scrolls and other Jewish literature of the Second Temple period is of major significance for the study of the New Testament and related texts. Indeed, here is an indication that the New Testament must itself be considered in many fundamental respects as Jewish literature. I am enormously grateful to the Academy for bestowing this significant, internationally-renowned award on me."
2025	Professor Carol A. Newsom	Dead Sea Scrolls	"for her distinguished contribution to the study of the Dead Sea Scrolls (particularly the Songs of the Sabbath Sacrifice), to ancient Hebrew Wisdom Literature, and to Apocalyptic"

== See also ==
- Awards of the British Academy
- List of religion-related awards
