= Riesenfeld =

Riesenfeld is a surname. Notable people with the surname include:

- Ernst Hermann Riesenfeld (1877–1957, German-Swedish chemist
- Harald Riesenfeld (1913–2008), Swedish theologian
- Hugo Riesenfeld (1879–1939), Jewish Austrian-American composer
- Stefan Riesenfeld (1908–1999), German-American legal scholar
