= Pierre-Maurice Bogaert =

Belgian Benedictine biblical scholar

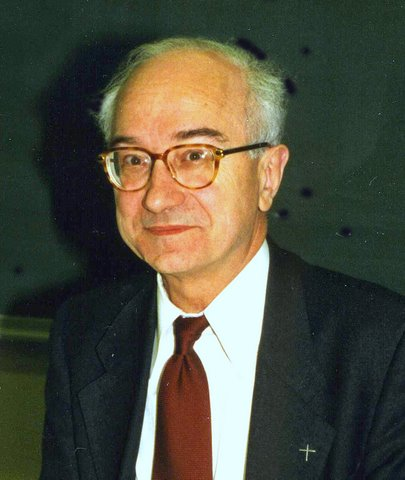
- Born: 1934; Etterbeek
- Education: University of Strasbourg
- Occupation: University teacher
- Employer: UCLouvain (1970–)

Pierre-Maurice Bogaert (born 1934, Etterbeek) is a Belgian Benedictine of the Monastery of Maredsous, professor emeritus of Old Testament at the Catholic University of Louvain and co-director of the Revue Bénédictine.

== Life ==
=== Education ===
Bogaert studied theology and exegesis in Leuven, Strasbourg (state doctorate), Jerusalem and Rome. From 1969 he holds his ThD from the University of Strasbourg.

=== Teaching ===
In 1991 Bogaert has become professor of Old Testament at the Université catholique de Louvain.

== Field of work ==
His research focuses on the ancient transmission of the Bible. Since 1964 he has published in the Bulletin de la Bible latine dans la Revue bénédictine (which he has directed since 2000). After 1992 Bogaert was chair of the Revue théologique de Louvain. He has taken an interest in the text of the Lobbes Bible (1084) in several articles. He is a contributor to the New Cambridge History of the Bible.

== Award ==
In 2005 he received the Burkitt Medal from the British Academy.

== Bibliography ==
Books

- Bogaert, P.-M. (1969). Apocalypse de Baruch: introduction, traduction du syriaque et commentaire. Sources chrétiennes. Vol. 144. Paris: Les Editions du Cerf. OCLC 466076401.
- Bogaert, P.-M. (1969). Apocalypse de Baruch: introduction, traduction du syriaque et commentaire. Sources chrétiennes. Vol. 145. Paris: Les Editions du Cerf. OCLC 466076401.

Articles

- Bogaert, P.-M. (1978). "Le témoignage de la Vetus Latina dans l'étude de la tradition des Septante: Ézéchiel et Daniel dans le Papyrus 967". Biblica. 59 (3): 384–395. JSTOR 42706730.
- Bogaert, Pierre-Maurice (1988). "La Bible latine des origines au moyen âge. Aperçu historique, état des questions (Première partie)". Revue Théologique de Louvain. 19 (2): 137–159.
- Bogaert, P.-M. (1994). "LE LIVRE DE JÉRÉMIE EN PERSPECTIVE : LES DEUX RÉDACTIONS ANTIQUES SELON LES TRAVAUX EN COURS". Revue Biblique. 101 (3): 363–406. JSTOR 44089199.
- Bogaert, Pierre-Maurice. "Les livres d'Esdras et leur numérotation dans l'histoire du canon de la Bible latine". Revue Bénédictine. 110: 5–26. doi:10.1484/J.RB.5.100750. ISSN 0035-0893.

== Sources ==
- Mared Sous. "Pierre-Maurice Bogaert".
- Université de Geneve. "Pierre Maurice Bogaert".
- The British Academy. "Burkitt Medal for Biblical Studies".
- "PIERRE-MAURICE BOGAERT". www.editionsducerf.fr.

Awards
| Preceded by Morna Hooker | Burkitt Medal; 2005 | Succeeded by Graham Stanton |
