= Aubrey Rodway Johnson =

University professor and Hebrew scholar (1901–1985)

Aubrey Rodway Johnson, FBA (23 April 1901 – 29 September 1985) was a British scholar of Hebrew and the Old Testament. He was professor of Semitic languages at the University College of South Wales and Monmouthshire in Cardiff (1944–66).

The son of a Baptist minister, he was born in Leamington Spa, but the family moved to Newport in Wales when Johnson was a child. After attending the Newport Intermediate School for Boys, he worked for his uncle's corn merchant business and then in the finance department of the Newport Borough Council. In 1919, he began working as a teacher, but in 1922 he gave this up to carry out missionary work. He studied at Trefecca Memorial College, where he became interested in Greek. In 1924, he began studying at Cardiff Baptist College and the University College of South Wales and Monmouthshire, graduating in 1928 with a first-class degree in Hebrew. He continued studying and in 1931 was awarded a PhD by the University of Wales.

Johnson was then given a fellowship of the university. In 1934, he was appointed to an assistant lectureship in Semitic languages at the University College of South Wales in Cardiff. He was promoted to a full lectureship before he succeeded T. H. Robinson to the professorship of Semitic languages in 1944. He retired in 1966.

Johnson was an Old Testament scholar. His published books include The One and the Many in the Israelite Conception of God (1942), The Cultic Prophet in Ancient Israel (1944), The Vitality of the Individual in the Thought of Ancient Israel (1949), Sacral Kingship in Ancient Israel (1955) and The Cultic Prophet and Israel's Psalmody (1979). He also wrote articles and book chapters, including several on the role of the king in ancient Israel. He was elected a fellow of the British Academy in 1951, received its Burkitt Medal in 1961 and was president of the Society for Old Testament Study in 1956. He died in 1985.
