= Francis Crawford Burkitt =

English theologian and biblical scholar (1864–1935)

Francis Burkitt FBA
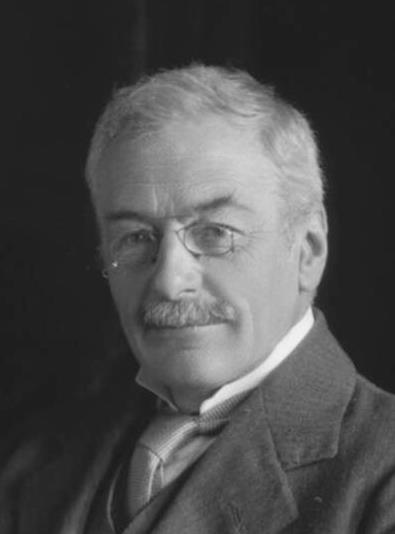
- Born: Francis Crawford Burkitt; 3 September 1864
- Died: 11 May 1935 (aged 70)

Academic background
- Education: Trinity College, Cambridge
- Influences: William Sanday; William Wright

Academic work
- Discipline: Biblical studies; philology; theology
- Sub-discipline: New Testament studies; Syriac studies
- School or tradition: Anglicanism
- Institutions: Trinity College, Cambridge

Francis Crawford Burkitt FBA (3 September 1864 – 11 May 1935) was an English theologian. As Norris Professor of Divinity at the University of Cambridge from 1905 until shortly before his death, Burkitt was a sturdy critic of the notion of a distinct "Caesarean Text" of the New Testament put forward by B. H. Streeter and others.

== Education and career ==
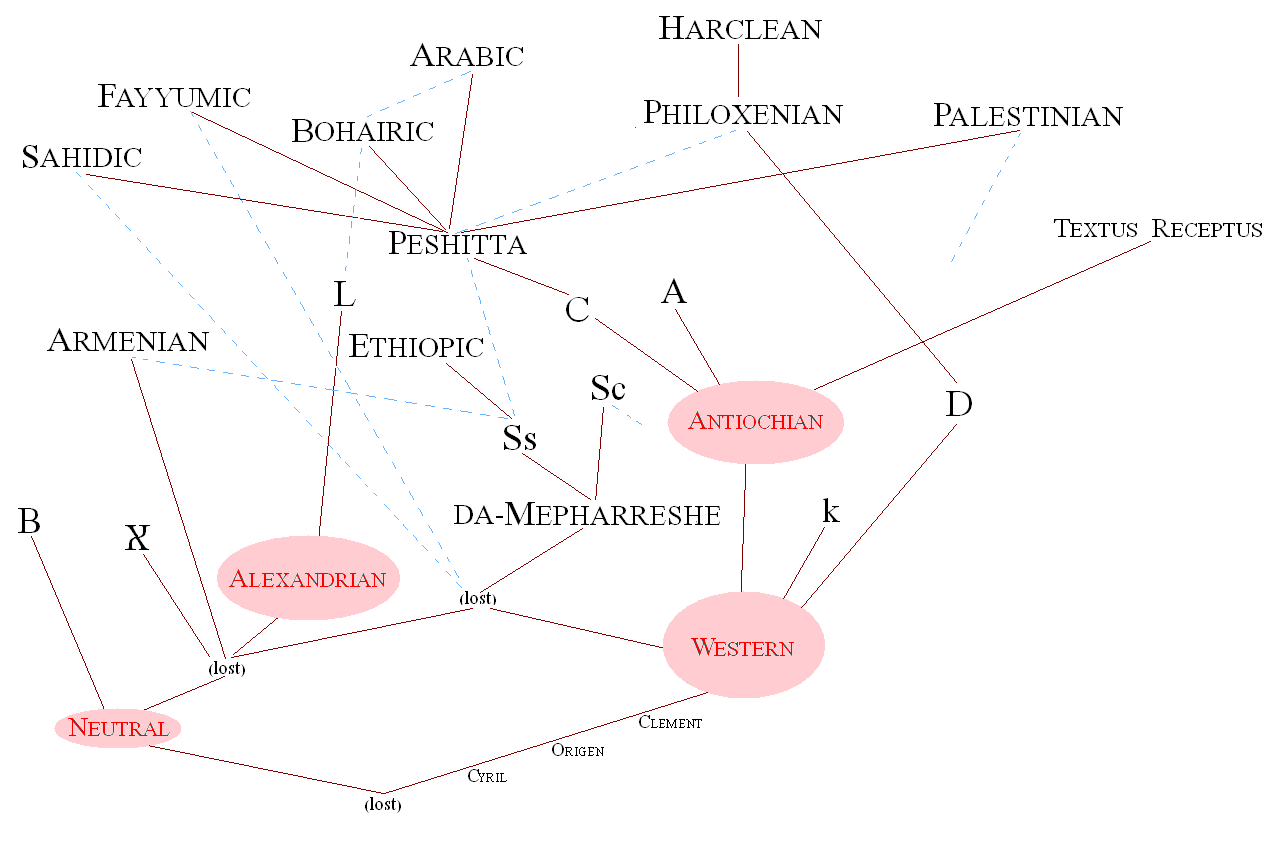
The inter-relationship between significant ancient manuscripts according to Burkitt

Burkitt was educated at Harrow School. He studied mathematics at Trinity College, Cambridge, graduating with a Bachelor of Arts (BA) degree in 1886: he was the 28th Wrangler that year. He then undertook the theological tripos and gained first-class honours in 1888. He received his Master of Arts (MA) in 1890. He was awarded both Bachelor of Divinity (BD) and Doctor of Divinity (DD) degrees in 1915.

From 1903 to 1905, he was a lecturer in palaeography at the University of Cambridge. He was Norrisian Professor of Divinity from 1905 to 1934, and then Norris–Hulse Professor of Divinity from 1934 until his death in 1935. In 1926, he was additionally elected a professorial fellow of Trinity College, Cambridge.

Burkitt accompanied Robert Bensly, James Rendel Harris, and sisters Agnes and Margaret Smith on the 1893 expedition to Saint Catherine's Monastery in Egypt to examine a Syriac palimpsest of the Gospels discovered there the previous year by the sisters. Burkitt played an important role in deciphering the text and in subsequent publication of the team's findings.

Burkitt was a noted figure at Cambridge in 1912–1935 for his chairmanship of the Cambridge New Testament Seminar, attended by other prominent theologians, including Robert Newton Flew, who left an account of it in an obituary for Burkitt in the Proceedings of the British Academy. He was also president of the Cambridge Philological Society from 1904 to 1905. Burkitt was one of the founding member of the Cambridge Theological Society that was dedicated to research, and president from 1907-09.

== Personal life ==
Burkitt married Amy Persis in 1888. Together, they had one son, Miles Crawford Burkitt, who went on to become an archaeologist and academic.

Burkitt died suddenly at his home on West Road, Cambridge on 11 May 1935, aged 70.

== Honours ==
The Burkitt Medal, awarded by the British Academy, is named in his honour.

== Works ==
Descriptions of end-time beliefs in Judaism and Christianity. (The Schweich Lectures (1913).

=== Books ===
- Burkitt, Francis C. (1894). The Book of Rules of Tyconius: newly edited from the mss., with an introduction and an examination into the text of the Biblical quotations. Cambridge, England: Cambridge University Press. OCLC 6132125.
- Burkitt, Francis C.; Bensly, Robert L.; Harris, J. Rendel (1894). The Four Gospels in Syriac, transcribed from the Sinaitic palimpsest. Cambridge, England: Cambridge University Press. ISBN 9780837013770. OCLC 2433500.
- Burkitt, Francis C. (1896). The Old Latin and the Itala: With an appendix containing the text of the S. Gallen Palimpsest of Jeremiah. Cambridge, England: Cambridge University Press. OCLC 3314332.
- Burkitt, Francis C. (1899). Early Christianity Outside the Roman Empire, two lectures delivered at Trinity College, Dublin . Cambridge, England: The University Press. OCLC 457206218 – via Wikisource. [scan ]
- Burkitt, Francis C. (1901). Two Lectures on the Gospels. London & New York: Macmillan. OCLC 3381853.
- Burkitt, Francis C. (1901). Saint Ephraim's Quotations From The Gospel. Cambridge, England: Cambridge University Press. OCLC 3792630.
- Burkitt, Francis C.; Kenyon, Frederic G.; Headlam, Arthur C.; et al. (1902). Criticism of the New Testament: St. Margaret's Lectures 1902. New York: Scribners Sons. OCLC 4107994.
- Burkitt, Francis C. (1904). Early Eastern Christianity: Saint Margaret's Lectures on the Syriac Speaking Church 1904. London: John Murray. OCLC 941047442.
- Burkitt, Francis C. (1904). Evangelion da-mepharreshe: The Curetonian Version of the Four Gospels, with the readings of the Sinai Palimpsest. I. Text; II: Introduction and Notes. Cambridge, England: Cambridge University Press. OCLC 557772466.
- Burkitt, Francis C. (1907). The Gospel History and its Transmission. Edinburgh: T&T Clark.
- Burkitt, Francis C. (1914). Jewish and Christian Apocalypses: Schweich Lectures of the British Academy 1913. London: The British Academy. OCLC 458985970.
- Burkitt, Francis C. (1924). Christian Beginnings: Three Lectures. London: University of London Press. OCLC 253528260.
- Burkitt, Francis C. (1925). The Religion of the Manichees: Donnellan Lectures 1924. Cambridge, England: Cambridge University Press. OCLC 79046876.
- Burkitt, Francis C.; Robinson, Theodore H.; Hunkin, Joseph W. (1929). Palestine in General History: Schweich Lectures of the British Academy 1926. London: Oxford University Press. OCLC 1091929228.
- Burkitt, Francis C. (1930). Christian Worship. Christian religion, its origin and progress. 3. The church of to-day, pt. 2. Cambridge, England: Cambridge University Press. OCLC 1014109.
- Burkitt, Francis C.; Gardner-Smith, P.; Raven, Charles E. (1930). The Christian Religion and Its Origin and Progress, Volume 3 :The Church of Today. Cambridge, England: Cambridge University Press. OCLC 912955287.
- Burkitt, Francis C. (1932). Jesus Christ: An Historical Outline. London: Blackie & Son. OCLC 472794866.
- Burkitt, Francis C. (1932). Church and Gnosis: a Study of Christian Thought and Speculation in the Second Century: The Morse lectures for 1931. Cambridge, England: Cambridge University Press. OCLC 640005752.
- Burkitt, Francis C.; Goad, Harold E.; Little, A. G. (1932). Franciscan Essays II. British Society of Franciscan Studies, Extra series. Manchester: The University Press. OCLC 1096531998.

=== Edited by ===
- Burkitt, Francis C., ed. (1896). The New Testament in Greek (2nd ed.).
- Burkitt, Francis C., ed. (1897). Fragments of the Books of Kings according to the Translation of Aquila. Cambridge, England: Cambridge University Press. OCLC 65478051.

=== Journal articles ===
- Burkitt, Francis C. (January 1900). "Notes. Saint Mark XV 34 in Codex Bobiensis". The Journal of Theological Studies. 1 (2): 278–279.
- Burkitt, Francis C. (January 1900). "Notes. On the Baptismal Rite in the Canons of Hippolytus". The Journal of Theological Studies. 1 (2): 279.
- Burkitt, Francis C. (January 1900). "Notes. The Original Language or the Acts of Judas Thomas". The Journal of Theological Studies. 1 (2): 280–290.
- Burkitt, Francis C. (October 1903). "Further Notes on codex k". The Journal of Theological Studies. 5 (17): 100–107.
- Burkitt, Francis C. (October 1904). "The Palestinian Syriac Lectionary". The Journal of Theological Studies. 6 (21): 91–98.
- Burkitt, Francis C. (October 1909). "The Oldest MS of St Justin's Martyrdom". The Journal of Theological Studies. 11 (41): 61–66.
- Burkitt, Francis C. (January 1910). "Saint Augustine's Bible and the Itala". Journal of Theological Studies. 11 (42): 258–268.
- Burkitt, Francis C. (April 1910). "The Peraean Ministry: A Reply". The Journal of Theological Studies. 11 (43): 412–415.
- Burkitt, Francis C. (April 1910). "Saint Augustine's Bible and the Itala". The Journal of Theological Studies. 11 (43): 447–458.
- Burkitt, Francis C. (July 1910). "Codex Alexandrinus". The Journal of Theological Studies. 11 (4): 603–606.
- Burkitt, Francis C. (January 1911). "The Waters of Shiloah That Go Softly: A Note on Isaiah VIII 6". Journal of Theological Studies. 12 (46): 294–295.
- Burkitt, Francis C. (January 1911). "On Matt. XI 27, Luke X 22". Journal of Theological Studies. 12 (46): 296–297.
- Burkitt, Francis C. (April 1911). "Additional Note". Journal of Theological Studies. 12 (47): 457–459.
- Burkitt, Francis C. (April 1911). "On Immediately in Matt. XXIV 29". Journal of Theological Studies. 12 (47): 460–461.
- Burkitt, Francis C. (April 1912). "A New MS of the Odes of Solomon". Journal of Theological Studies. 13 (51): 372–385.
- Burkitt, Francis C. (July 1912). "Woman, What Have I To Do With Thee?". Journal of Theological Studies. 13 (52): 594–595.
- Burkitt, Francis C. (October 1919). "William Sanday". The Expository Times. 31 (1): 20–21. doi:10.1177/001452461903100104. S2CID 221051734.
- Burkitt, Francis C. (February 1927). "The Baptism of Jesus". The Expository Times. 38 (5): 198–202. doi:10.1177/001452462703800502. S2CID 170930477.
- Burkitt, Francis C. (October 1929). "A Further Note on the Pahlavi Crosses". The Journal of Theological Studies. 31 (121): 47–48.
- Burkitt, Francis C. (April 1930). "The Didascalia". The Journal of Theological Studies. 31 (123): 258–265.
- Burkitt, Francis C. (October 1934). "The Chester Beatty Biblical Papyri". The Journal of Theological Studies. 34 (136): 363–368.
- Burkitt, Francis C. (July 1935). "The Dura Fragment of Tatian". The Journal of Theological Studies. 36 (143): 255–259.

Academic offices
| Preceded by Frederic Chase | Norrisian Professor; 1905–1934 | Succeeded by Himself as Norris–Hulse Professor of Divinity |
| Preceded by William Emery Barnes as Hulsean Professor of Divinity | Norris–Hulse Professor of Divinity; 1934–1935 | Succeeded by C. H. Dodd |
| Preceded by Himself as Norrisian Professor | Norris–Hulse Professor of Divinity; 1934–1935 | Succeeded by C. H. Dodd |
