= C. K. Barrett =

British biblical scholar and Methodist minister (1917–2011)

C. K. Barrett FBA
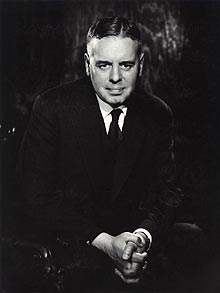
- Born: Charles Kingsley Barrett; 4 May 1917; Salford, UK
- Died: 26 August 2011 (aged 94)
- Education: Pembroke College, Cambridge
- Occupation: Theologian
- Spouse: Margaret
- Children: 2
- Theological work
- Era: Late 20th and early 21st centuries
- Tradition or movement: Methodist

Charles Kingsley Barrett FBA (4 May 1917 – 26 August 2011) was a British biblical scholar and Methodist minister. He served as Professor of Divinity at the University of Durham and wrote commentaries on the Acts of the Apostles, John, Romans, 1 Corinthians and 2 Corinthians.

== Early life and education ==
Barrett was born in Salford, and studied at Shebbear College, Devon, Pembroke College, Cambridge, and Wesley House in Cambridge.

== Career ==
Barrett was ordained to the ministry in the Methodist Church, and appointed lecturer in divinity at the University of Durham in 1945, where he was elected professor in 1958. He also preached on a regular basis in the Darlington circuit of the Methodist Church and more widely.

Barrett has been described as standing alongside C. H. Dodd as "the greatest British New Testament scholar of the 20th century" and "the greatest UK commentator on New Testament writings since J. B. Lightfoot".

== Honours ==
Barrett was elected a Fellow of the British Academy (FBA) in 1961, and was awarded its Burkitt Medal in 1966. He served as president of the Society for New Testament Studies in 1973.

In 1982, a Festschrift was published in his honour. Paul and Paulinism: Essays in Honour of C.K. Barrett included contributions from Morna Hooker, F. F. Bruce, I. Howard Marshall, Martin Hengel, and John Painter.

== Selected works ==
- Barrett, C. K. (1947). The Holy Spirit and the Gospel tradition. London: S.P.C.K.
- ——— (1955). The Gospel According to St. John: an introduction with commentary and notes on the Greek text. London: S.P.C.K.
- ——— (1956). The New Testament Background: selected documents edited, with introductions. London: S.P.C.K.
- ——— (1957). A Commentary on the Epistle to the Romans. London: A. & C. Black.
- ——— (1963). The Pastoral Epistles in the New English Bible. Oxford: Oxford University Press.
- ——— (1967). Jesus and the Gospel Tradition. London: S.P.C.K.
- ——— (1968). A Commentary on the First Epistle to the Corinthians. London: A. & C. Black.
- ——— (1970). The Gospel of John and Judaism. London: S.P.C.K.
- ——— (1973). A Commentary on the Second Epistle to the Corinthians. London: A. & C. Black.
- ——— (1977). Reading Through Romans. London: SCM Press.
- ——— (1982). Essays on Paul. London: S.P.C.K.
- ——— (1982). Essays on John. London: S.P.C.K.
- ——— (1985). Freedom and Obligation: Study of the Epistle to the Galatians. London: S.P.C.K.
- ——— (1994). Paul: An Introduction to His Thought. Geoffrey Chapman.
- ——— (1994). A Critical and Exegetical Commentary on The Acts of the Apostles: Vol. 1, Preliminary Introduction and Commentary on Acts I-XIV. ICC. London: T&T Clark.
- ——— (1999). A Critical and Exegetical Commentary on The Acts of the Apostles: Vol. 2, Preliminary Introduction and Commentary on Acts XV-XXVIII. ICC. London: T&T Clark.
- ——— (2002). Acts of the Apostles: A Shorter Commentary. ICC. London: T&T Clark.
