= Västmanlands-Dala nation =

Student nation of Uppsala University

Coordinates: 59°51′36.75″N 17°37′43″E

Västmanland's-Dala Nation
- Uppsala University
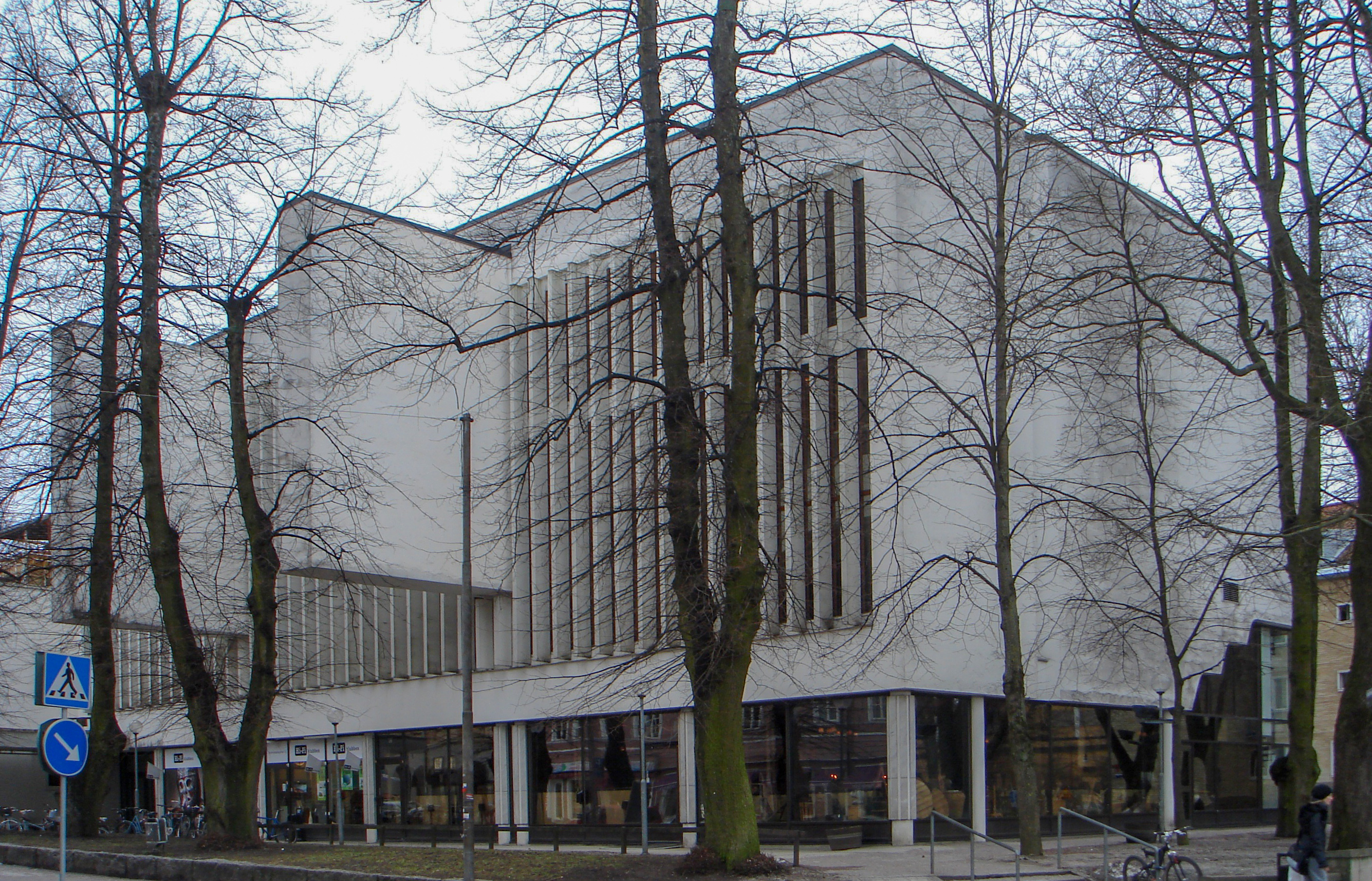
- Location: S:t Larsgatan 13; Box 2062; 750 02 Uppsala; Sweden
- Latin name: Natio Westmanno-Dalecarliae
- Abbreviation: V-Dala
- Established: 1639
- Inspektor: Johan Tysk
- Membership: 5290
- Website: www.v-dala.se

Västmanlands-Dala nation, mostly referred to only as V-Dala, is one of the 13 student nations at Uppsala University in Sweden. The nation, intended for students from the provinces of Dalarna and Västmanland – these provinces making up most of the diocese of Västerås – was founded in 1639. The first inspektor of the nation was Olof Rudbeck the Elder, appointed in 1663. The current inspektor (as of 2021) is Johan Tysk, professor, Department of Mathematics, Uppsala University.

== Architecture ==
The house of Västmanlands-Dala nation is one of three buildings in Sweden designed by the world-famous Finnish architect Alvar Aalto. The house was built in 1965, and was paid for by fund-raising in Dalarna and Västmanland.

== Inspektors ==
Västmanlands-Dala nation

- Olof Rudbeck the Elder 1663–1696
- Jesper Svedberg 1696–1703
- Johan Palmroot 1703–1727
- Erik Alstrin 1727–1732
- Anders Grönwall 1732–1747
- Lars Dahlman 1748–1764
- Carl Fredrik Georgii 1764–1781
- Fredrik Mallet 1781–1794
- Daniel Boëthius 1795–1810
- Benjamin Höijer 1810–1812
- Lars Georg Rabenius 1812–1838
- Christian Erik Fahlcrantz 1838–1849
- Johan Henrik Schröder 1850–1857
- Carl Edward Zedritz 1857–1859
- Carl Wilhelm Böttiger 1859–1866
- Wilhelm Erik Svedelius 1866–1882
- Edward Clason 1882–1897
- Oscar Josef Alin 1897–1900
- Simon Johannes Boëthius 1901–1915
- Sam Wide 1915–1918
- Erik Stave 1918–1922
- Östen Bergstrand 1922–1931
- Henrik Samuel Nyberg 1931–1956
- Gunnar Tideström 1956–1966
- Harald Riesenfeld 1966–1981
- Mats Olsmats 1981–2006
- Anne-Liis von Knorring 2006–2011
- Johan Sundström 2011–2016
- Peter Wallensteen 2016–2021
- Johan Tysk 2021-
