= Elly Schwab-Agallidis =

Greek physicist (1914–2006)

- Έλλη Αγαλλίδου
- Born: Elly Agallidis; 14 August 1914; Athens, Greece
- Died: 24 December 2006 (aged 92); Essen, Germany
- Other name: Elly Schwab
- Education: National and Kapodistrian University of Athens; Ludwig-Maximilians-Universität München
- Known for: Reactions of parahydrogen
- Spouse: Georg-Maria Schwab
- Children: Andreas Josef Scwhab; Maria Schwab; Johanna Schwab
- Scientific career
- Fields: Physical chemistry, Solid-state physics
- Workplaces: Kanellopoulos Institute of Chemistry and Agriculture; National and Kapodistrian University of Athens
- Thesis: Ἐπίδρασις ἐλευθέρων ἀτόμων καὶ ῥιζῶν ἐπὶ τοῦ παραϋδρογόνου (Note: English: Influence of Free Radicals on Parahydrogen) (1939)
- Doctoral advisor: Georg-Maria Schwab

Elly Schwab-Agallidis (born Elly Agallidis, Greek: Έλλη Αγαλλίδου, pronounced [ˈeli aɣaˈliðu]; 14 August 1914 – 24 December 2006) was a Greek physicist/physical chemist and one of the first women in Greece to be awarded a PhD in the field. She was the wife of Georg-Maria Schwab, who met her at the Ludwig-Maximilians-Universität München as the supervisor of the experimental work for her doctoral thesis; the couple then worked together as researchers at the Kanellopoulos Institute of Chemistry and Agriculture after they immigrated to Greece. Her most famous work concerned the properties and reactivity of parahydrogen.

== Biography ==
Elly Agallidis was born in 1914 to a middle class family of Athens; she was the first child of Ioannis Agallidis and Maria-Edith Agallidis (née Zannou). She graduated with a degree in Physics from the National and Kapodistrian University of Athens in 1934 and continued with postgraduate studies in the Physical Chemistry Laboratory of the Ludwig-Maximilians-Universität München, then under the direction of Heinrich Otto Wieland. It was there that she met Georg-Maria Schwab, her future husband, who suggested that she examine parahydrogen and supervised her experimental work.

Schwab was banned from teaching in Nazi Germany due to his half-Jewish origin. With the increasing fear of prosecution, he decided in 1930 to immigrate to Elly's homeland, Greece. Agallidis and Schwab married in Athens the same year. Schwab-Agallidis was able to find work for both in the chemical laboratory of the Kanellopoulos Institute of Chemistry and Agriculture, where the couple collaborated on various topics of physico-chemical research for the next ten years (1939–1949). Among those topics Schwab-Agallidis continued her work on the properties of parahydrogen, for which she received her PhD by the Department of Physics of the National and Kapodistrian University of Athens in 1939 and published multiple relevant papers in the following years. At the same period she also delivered lectures on Physical Chemistry at the National and Kapodistrian University of Athens.

After a difficult period for the couple during the Axis occupation of Greece and the resumption of their research after the liberation of Greece, the two scientists eventually returned to West Germany when Schwab was offered the Professorship of Physical Chemistry at the Ludwig-Maximilians-Universität München in 1951.

Elly Schwab-Agallidis died in Essen at the age of 92 in 2006.
