= Peter Wallensteen =

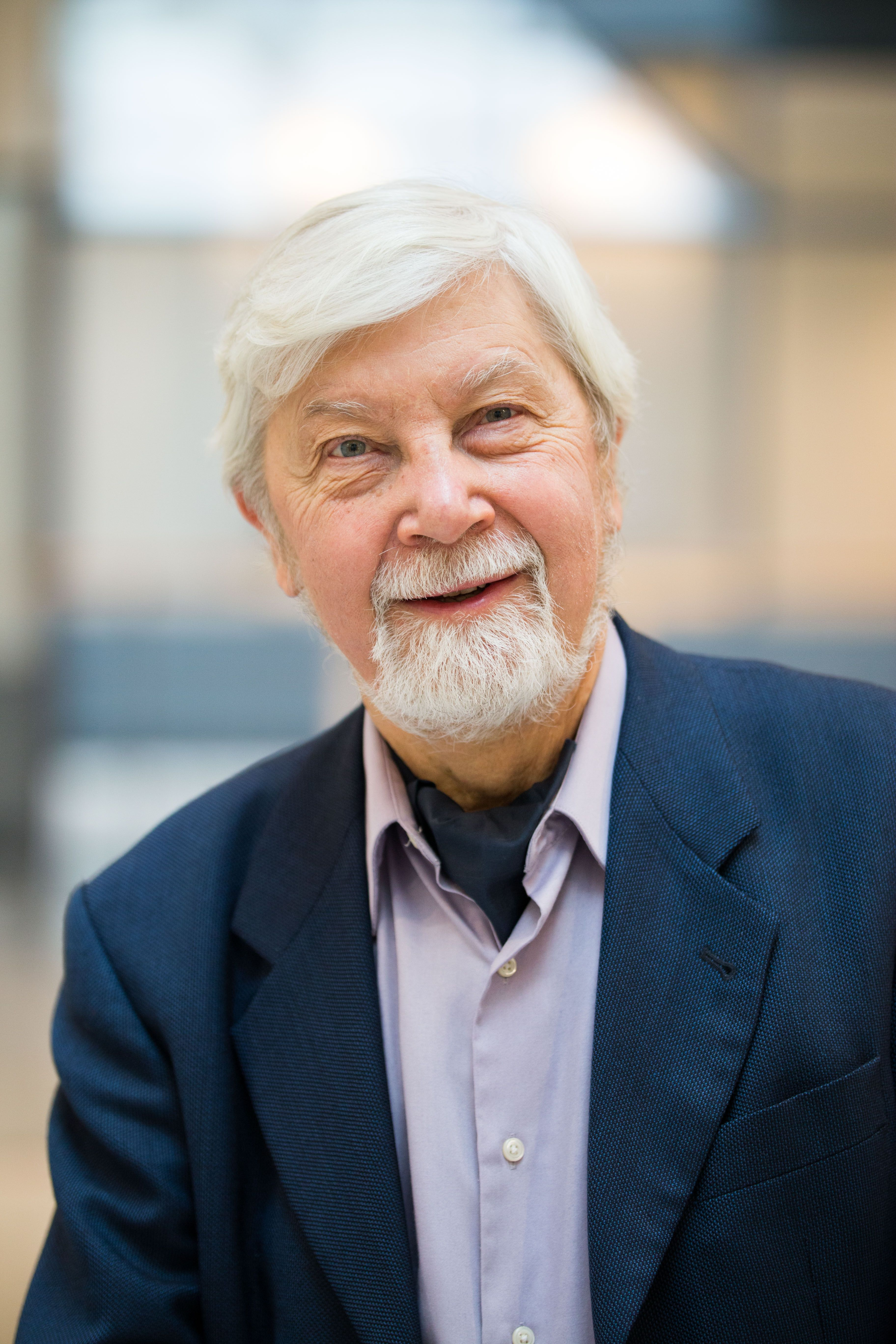
Portrait of Peter Wallensteen

Peter Wallensteen (born 29 July 1945, Stockholm) is a peace and conflict researcher in Sweden, now Senior Professor in Peace and Conflict Research at Uppsala University. He was the first holder of the Dag Hammarskjöld Chair in Peace and Conflict Research at Uppsala University, 1985-2012. He was the Richard G. Starmann Sr. Research Professor of Peace Studies, at the Kroc Institute for International Peace Studies at University of Notre Dame (Indiana, USA), 2006-2018. From 1972 to 1999 he directed the Department of Peace and Conflict Research at Uppsala University.

He is recognized in the scholarly community through his studies of international economic sanctions, where he is leading SPITS, the Special Program on the Implementation of Targeted Sanctions. The program deals primarily with UN economic sanctions.

One of his major contributions to international peace research is the Uppsala Conflict Data Program (UCDP), which he initiated in 1978 and led until 2015. UCDP collects data on armed conflict throughout the world, and has become a leading data provider on organized violence. In 2011 the program was specifically awarded by APSA, the American Political Science Association.

At Uppsala University he chaired the University Committee for the Holmdahl Prize in Human Rights (2014-2023) and at the Regina Theatre, Uppsala, he conducted its regular sessions Philosophy Tea (2014-2021) together with lecturer Daniel Ogden, discussing authors, practitioners and philosophers concerned with issues of peace, war and justice.

For the period 2016-2021 he was the Inspector of the Västmanlands-Dala Nation (a student club with 5 000 members). He was a member of the Advisory Council of the Folke Bernadotte Academy, Stockholm, 2017-2023. Since 2021 he is the Vice Chair of the Alva Myrdal Center for Nuclear Disarmament, Uppsala University.

== Research ==
Early in his career Wallensteen had published on economic sanctions, notably in the Journal of Peace Research in 1968 in one of the first systematic studies of the efficacy of sanctions. It outlined the conditions under which such sanctions were likely to succeed. Wallensteen has continued to be engaged in the study of sanctions. In 2001-2003 he led the Stockholm Process initiated by the Swedish Ministry for Foreign Affairs for the benefit of the UN. This project focused on the conditions for making targeted sanctions more effective. It had a significant impact on the UN conduct of targeted sanctions.

In 1973 Peter Wallensteen received his Ph.D. in political science at Uppsala University with his dissertation Structure and war: On international relations, 1920-1968. The dissertation dealt with the links between international dependencies, social order and the onset of war. It included one of the first statistically based conclusions that liberal major powers had not been at war with one another.

In the years 1972-1999 Wallensteen was directing the Department of Peace and Conflict Research at Uppsala University, i.e. from its inception until it had a full teaching and research program. He was one of the pioneers in this discipline in the country. When he was appointed to the Dag Hammarskjöld Chair in 1985 the Department could start the first research education program in peace and conflict research. By 2020 more than 50 persons had received a Ph.D. in this program.

His research interest also include mediation studies and Wallensteen has experience as third party in conflicts such as those involving Papua New Guinea (Bougainville), Israel-Palestine, Nagorno-Karabakh and Cyprus.

At the newly started Alva Myrdal Centre for Nuclear Disarmament, Wallensteen leads a working group on the use of sanctions for the prevention of proliferation of nuclear weapons. An edited volume was published in 2024.

Lately, he has been concerned with the notion of “quality peace” to understand the conditions after a war that will not lead to a resumption of armed conflict.

== Publications (examples) ==
Wallensteen’s most widely read book is Understanding Conflict Resolution which in 2023 saw its sixth edition and has been translated into Arabic and Korean. His book Peace Research: Theory and Practice from 2011 reprints 13 of Wallensteen’s earlier articles and has unique overviews of different areas of peace research. It has been translated into Chinese. Similarly the volume Peter Wallensteen: A Pioneer in Making Peace Researchable (Springer 2021) brings together 32 different articles, chapters and original texts on a set of peace research topics.

Together with Isak Svensson, Wallensteen has written The Go-Between: Jan Eliasson and Styles of Mediation (2010), which is an analysis of situations in which the Swedish leading diplomat Jan Eliasson has been involved as a mediator. Also the work (in Swedish) Fredens diplomater (2016) is done with Isak Svensson and the authors scrutinize some 50 Nordic mediation efforts since the time of Count Folke Bernadotte.In 2025 Cambridge University Press publishes The Peacemaking Mandate: Nordic Experiences in International Mediation, building on updated information and with a mandate focused approach to mediation.

His work Quality Peace: Peacebuilding, Victory and World Order (2015) specifies his approach to the conditions after a war. The topic is continued in the edited volume Understanding Quality Peace (2019, with Madhav Joshi).

== Awards and prizes (recent) ==
- 2019 - James A. Burns, C.S.C: Award, University of Notre Dame, USA, for "Distinction in graduateteaching or other exemplary contributions to graduate education", May 17, 2019
- 2018 - Torgny Segerstedt Medal, Uppsala University 2018, awarded January 2019.
- 2016 - International Studies Association (ISA). Peace Studies Section’s Distinguished Scholar Award, 2016. Awarded at the ISA 57th Annual Convention, Atlanta, USA, March 16, 2016
- 2014 - FUF Prize 2014. FUF. The Swedish Development Forum, December 2014.
- 2014 - H.M. The King’s Medal 2014, 8th size, for distinguished contributions in the field of peace and conflict research, by the King of Sweden, awarded June 11, 2014
- 2013 - The Eldh-Ekblads Peace Prize 2013, from the Swedish Peace and Arbitration Society, for the furthering of peace research.
- 2011 Rudbeckmedaljen
