= Ulrich Luz =

Swiss theologian and professor (1938–2019)

- Born: February 23, 1938; Männedorf
- Died: October 13, 2019 (aged 81)
- Occupations: Theologian and professor emeritus
- Spouse: Salome Keller
- Children: Three

Academic work
- Institutions: International Christian University, Göttingen University, University of Bern
- Main interests: Gospel of Matthew

Ulrich Luz (23 February 1938 – 13 October 2019) was a Swiss theologian and professor emeritus at the University of Bern.

== Early life ==
He was born on 23 February 1938 in Männedorf. He studied Protestant theology in Zurich, Göttingen and Basel under Hans Conzelmann, Eduard Schweizer and Gerhard Ebeling.

== Academic career ==
He taught at the International Christian University in Tokyo from 1970 to 1971. From 1972 to 1980 he was professor for New Testament studies at Göttingen University. He was the New Testament professor at the University of Bern in Switzerland until his retirement in 2003.

Much of his research focused on the Gospel of Matthew and was made available in English in the Hermeneia commentary on the Gospel, which was released in three volumes over a period of more than 20 years. Luz served as president of the Studiorum Novi Testamenti Societas in 1998.

== Personal life ==
He and his wife, Salome Keller, had three children.

== Honours ==
Luz had seven honorary doctorates. He received one of them in 2006 from the Faculty of Theology at Uppsala University. In 2010, he was awarded the Burkitt Medal by the British Academy 'in recognition of special service to Biblical Studies'.

== Works ==
=== Thesis ===
- Luz, Ulrich (1968). Das Geschichtsverstandnis des Paulus (Ph.D.). Beiträge zur evangelischen Theologie. Vol. 49. München: C. Kaiser. OCLC 1002730.

=== Books ===
- ———; Lapide, Pinchas (1985). Jesus in Two Perspectives : a Jewish-Christian dialog. Minneapolis, MO: Augsburg. ISBN 9780806621715. OCLC 12314510.
- ——— (1989). Matthew 1-7: a commentary. Hermeneia -a critical and historical commentary on the Bible. Minneapolis, MO: Augsburg. ISBN 9780806624020.
- ——— (1994). Matthew in history : interpretation, influence, and effects. Minneapolis, MO: Augsburg. ISBN 9780800628338. OCLC 30079235.
- ——— (1995). The Theology of the Gospel of Matthew. New Testament Theology. Cambridge & New York: Cambridge University Press. ISBN 9780521434331. OCLC 31011628.
- ——— (2001). Matthew 8-20: a commentary. Hermeneia -a critical and historical commentary on the Bible. Minneapolis, MO: Augsburg. ISBN 9780800660345.
- ——— (2005). Matthew 21-28: a commentary. Hermeneia -a critical and historical commentary on the Bible. Minneapolis, MO: Augsburg. ISBN 9780800637705.
- ——— (2005). Studies In Matthew. Grand Rapids, MI: Eerdmans. ISBN 9780802839640. OCLC 57207590.
- ———; Michaels, Axel (2006). Encountering Jesus & Buddha: their lives and teachings. Minneapolis, MO: Fortress Press. ISBN 9780800635633. OCLC 69241441.

=== As editor ===
- ———; Weder, Hans, eds. (1983). Die Mitte des Neuen Testaments: Einheit und Vielfalt neutestamentlich: Festschrift für Eduard Schweizer zum siebzigsten Geburtstag. Göttingen: Vandenhoeck & Ruprecht. ISBN 9783525581230. OCLC 8184518.
- ———; Dietrich, Walter, eds. (2002). The Bible in a World Context: An Experiment in Contextual Hermeneutics. Grand Rapids, MI: Eerdmans. ISBN 9780802849885. OCLC 48474062.
