= Georg-Maria Schwab =

German chemist

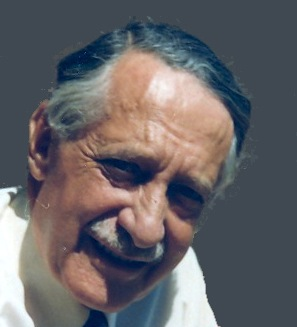
- Schwab, ca. 1975
- Born: 3 February 1899; Berlin, German Empire
- Died: 23 December 1984 (aged 85); Munich, West Germany
- Other name: Γεώργιος Σβαμπ (Greek)
- Citizenship: Bavarian
- Education: Friedrich Wilhelm University of Berlin
- Known for: work on ozone, kinetics of heterogeneous catalysis, catalyst poisoning, inorganic chromatography, physical chemistry and catalysis textbooks
- Spouse: Elly Agallidis (physicist)
- Children: Andreas Josef Schwab; Maria Edith Schwab; Johanna Monika Schwab
- Awards: Ordinary Member of the Bavarian Academy of Sciences (1952); Member of the Leopoldina and Heidelberg Academy of Sciences (1956); Liebig Medal of the GDCh (1960); Order of the Crown (Officer) of Belgium; Order of George I (Gold Cross) of Greece
- Scientific career
- Fields: Physical chemistry, Catalysis, Kinetics
- Workplaces: Friedrich Wilhelm University of Berlin, Institute of Physical Chemistry (Research Assistant, 1923–1925); University of Würzburg (Research Assistant, 1925–1927; Privatdozent, 1927–1928); Ludwig-Maximilians-Universität München (Privatdozent, 1928–1933; Extraordinary Professor, 1933–1938); Kanellopoulos Institute of Chemistry and Agriculture (Researcher, 1939–1950); National Technical University of Athens (Professor of Physical Chemistry, 1949–1959); Technical University of Darmstadt (Guest Professor, 1950–1951); Ludwig-Maximilians-Universität München (Professor of Physical Chemistry, 1951–1967)
- Thesis: Über Ozon (1923)
- Doctoral advisor: Ernst Hermann Riesenfeld

Georg-Maria Schwab (pronounced [ˈɡeːɔʁk maˈʁiːa ʃvaːp], Greek: Γεώργιος Σβαμπ; 3 February 1899 – 23 December 1984) was a German-Greek physical chemist recognised for his important contributions in the field of catalysis and the kinetics thereof.

Schwab's early academic career at the Friedrich Wilhelm University of Berlin and the University of Würzburg (1923–1928) was characterised by meticulous experimental work as a kineticist, before starting his specialisation in heterogeneous catalysis at the Ludwig-Maximilians-Universität München (1928–1938). Dismissed by Nazi Germany on antisemitic grounds, he emigrated to Greece with the help of his future wife Elly Schwab-Agallidis, where together, they continued conducting physico-chemical research (1939–1950). Eventually returning to West Germany in the 1950s, Schwab served as professor of physical chemistry at the Ludwig-Maximilians-Universität München until retirement (1951–1967).

== Biography ==
=== Early life and career ===
Schwab was born in 1899 in Berlin as the second son of famed journalist Josef Bernhard Schwab and his wife, the writer Marie Köglmayr. Both his parents originated from Bavaria; Josef Schwab was a Franconian Jew and his wife a Catholic from Upper Bavaria. Georg-Maria finished his secondary education at the Friedrich Wilhelm Gymnasium in Berlin, and upon turning 18 was conscripted for WWI and served for a year with the Bavarian Army in Flanders.

Following WWI, Schwab studied Chemistry and Physics at the Friedrich Wilhelm University of Berlin. He continued his postgraduate studies there under the supervision of Ernst Hermann Riesenfeld and in 1923 received his doctorate with his thesis "Über Ozon" (On Ozone), which was awarded the rare distinction eximium opus. For the following two years, until 1925, Schwab worked as a research assistant to Max Bodenstein, the successor of Walther Nernst in the Institute of Physical Chemistry that Nernst founded in Berlin. Under Bodenstein, Schwab was initiated and trained in the field of chemical kinetics, in which he contributed much for the rest of his career.

In 1925, he accepted a position in the University of Würzburg, initially as the assistant of Otto Dimroth. He was eventually habilitated in 1927 as a Privatdozent in Würzburg with his habilitation thesis on the thermal decomposition of methane and ammonia. In 1928, after the invitation of Heinrich Otto Wieland, Schwab began working in the inorganic laboratory at the Ludwig-Maximilians-Universität München and was promoted to extraordinary professor in 1933.

It was during this period that he met his future wife Elly Agallidis (Greek: Έλλη Αγαλλίδου), a Greek physicist who was doing her PhD at the Ludwig-Maximilians-Universität München.

Schwab remained at his position at the Ludwig-Maximilians-Universität München until 1938, when he was expelled and barred from teaching by Nazi authorities on account of "racial grounds" i.e. his half-Jewish origin. Raised a Catholic, he had been previously unaware of his father's origin until questioned about it under the provisions of the 1933 anti-Semitic Civil Service Law.

=== Emigration to Greece ===
Unable to pursue his career, Schwab emigrated from Nazi Germany to Greece in 1939, He and Elly married in Athens in the same year. With the connections of his wife, both started research work in the industrial chemistry laboratory of the recently founded Kanellopoulos Institute of Chemistry and Agriculture in Piraeus.

For the following years he spent in Greece, Schwab (known in Greek as Γεώργιος Σβαμπ, pronounced [ʝeˈorʝi.os zvab]) came to view Greece as "his second fatherland".

While in the Kanellopoulos Institute, a sui generis research institution for contemporary Greece, he was allowed to pursue purely scientific work; indeed Schwab had a fruitful 11-year stay marked by a series of incidental discoveries as well as systematic studies continuing his previous work on catalysis.

Schwab was in a difficult situation during the Axis occupation of Greece, when he once again faced danger from the German occupying forces due to his Jewish background. In 1942, the German authorities refused to renew his German passport. Georg-Maria escaped the fate of his brother, Josef-Maria Schwab – who died as a forced labourer in Organisation Todt, by keeping a low profile in Greece and getting an exemption from the 1943 order for German citizens to return to Germany with the help of an official at the German Embassy in Athens.

After the liberation of Greece (1944), Schwab was able to resume his research at the Kanellopoulos Institute, until he was offered the Professorship of Physical Chemistry at the National Technical University of Athens in 1949. He kept the position and taught the subject for the next 10 years.

=== Later years ===
Starting from the 1950s, Schwab was allowed to return to West Germany, with his first post being guest professor at the Technical University of Darmstadt (1949) before he was appointed to the illustrious Professorship of Physical Chemistry at the Ludwig-Maximilians-Universität München in 1950. While holding the corresponding seat in Athens, Schwab continued visiting Greece to offer lectures on his course.

Meanwhile, he engaged in notable novel research regarding surface catalytic interactions. In the 1955–1956 academic year he was Dean of the Faculty of Natural Sciences of the Ludwig-Maximilians-Universität München. He retired in 1967 with the title of Emeritus Professor of Physical Chemistry, which he held until his death in 1984.

== Scientific work ==
Schwab's academic career was prolific in the many fields he became involved with; most famous were his contributions to the understanding and kinetics of phenomena relating to heterogeneous catalysis. In his career he published a total of more than 250 papers in eminent chemical journals.

=== Ozone ===
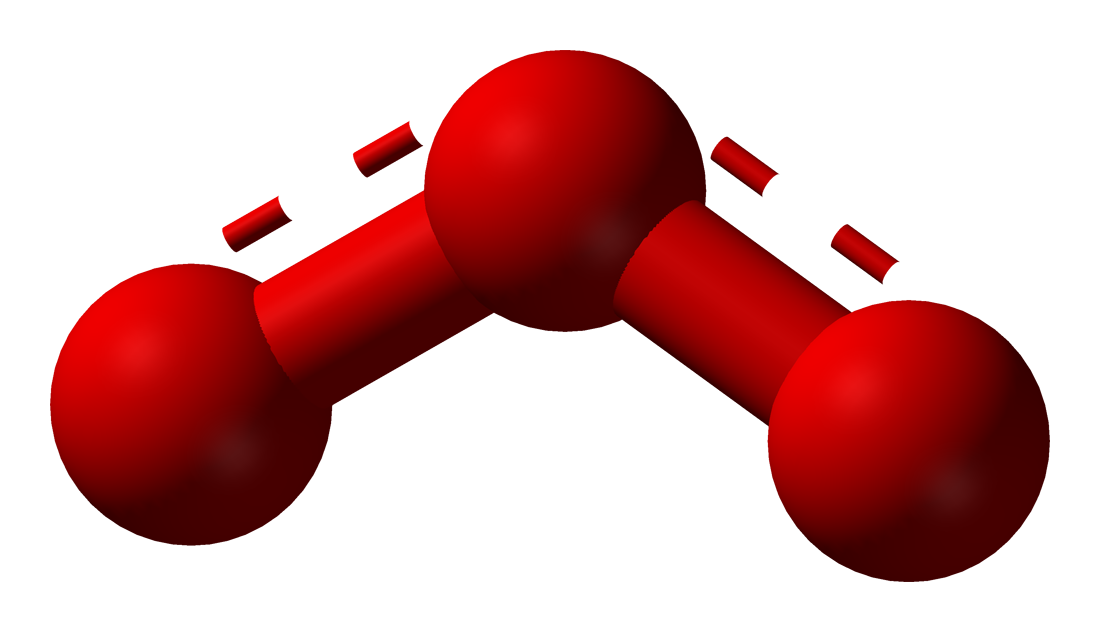
An ozone molecule; the pure gas was first prepared by Schwab.

His first important research work, undertaken as part of his doctoral studies under E. H. Riesenfeld in the early 1920s, concerned ozone, O_{3}. Schwab was the first to describe the preparation of pure ozone and its solidification, thereby accurately determining many of its physical constants. At the time, it was still not certain whether the tetratomic species oxozone, O_{4}, was also present in ozone samples. The work of young Schwab conclusively refuted the century-old theory of oxozone, which led to the exceptional grade of his dissertation.

=== Early kinetic work ===
Schwab's research interests seem to have switched to kinetics under the guidance of Max Bodenstein while at Nernst's Institute of Physical Chemistry in Berlin. Some of the problems on which Schwab worked on his own in this period included the thermal decomposition of methane, chemical reactions taking place during a cold cathode discharge, and the speed of dissolution of gases.

In Würzburg, he continued along a similar line of work studying gas dissolution, the thermal decomposition of ammonia, and the kinetics of photochlorination reactions.

=== Catalysis ===
Generalised depiction of heterogeneous catalysis studied by Schwab: the reactant (blue) is converted to product (red) at the surface of the catalyst phase (brown).

It was at the Ludwig-Maximilians-Universität München (1928–1938) that Schwab started systematic work on heterogeneous catalysis which marked the rest of his career. Among the catalysis-related topics he studied at the Ludwig-Maximilians-Universität München were the kinetics of heterogeneously catalysed reactions, the nature of the heat of adsorption, the poisoning of catalysts and the spatial distribution of active catalytic sites. He also collaborated with his future wife Elly on her research about the influence of free radicals on parahydrogen, a work which they completed in Greece.

In the Kanellopoulos Institute (1939–1950), with the academic freedom he was given Schwab produced research on various occasional topics such as inorganic chromatography (which he is credited with inventing), turn-over transitions, carbon adsorption and properties of parahydrogen. He also built on his previous work with a series of kinetic studies, which eventually led to his theory on the electronic mechanisms of metal catalysis.

In later years, after returning to the Ludwig-Maximilians-Universität München as professor of physical chemistry, Schwab discovered the surface catalytic influence of a metal in contact with a semiconductor catalyst or an insulator in contact with a metal catalyst (occasionally referred to as Schwab effects of the 1st and of the 2nd type, respectively).

=== Textbooks ===
Schwab was also known as a writer of physical chemistry and catalysis textbooks, with important works such as the Physico-chemical Foundations of Chemical Technology (German: Physikalisch-chemische Grundlagen der chemischen Technologie, 1928) or Catalysis from the Standoint of Chemical Kinetics (German: Katalyse vom Standpunkt der chemischen Kinetik, 1931), the English translation of which was a standard textbook on catalysis for decades. He was the editor of all 7 volumes of the international Handbook of Catalysis (1940–1960).

== Honours ==
Schwab received honours throughout his lifetime in recognition of his scientific work. In 1952 he became one of the only 45 ordinary members of the Bavarian Academy of Sciences, and in 1956 he was also inducted as a member of the Heidelberg Academy of Sciences and the German National Academy of Sciences Leopoldina.

In 1960 he was awarded the Liebig Medal of the German Chemical Society; he had also been awarded the Order of the Crown of Belgium (Officer class) as well as the Golden Cross of the Greek Order of George I.

Additionally, he was conferred honorary doctorates from the Sorbonne, the Free University of Berlin and the University of Liège, as well as an honorary professorship at the Central University of Venezuela.
