= Carl Holladay =

American scholar

- Born: October 18, 1943 (age 82); Huntingdon, Tennessee, US

Academic background
- Education: Freed–Hardeman College; Abilene Christian University; Princeton Theological Seminary; University of Cambridge
- Doctoral advisor: Ernst Bammel
- Other advisor: Bertil Gärtner

Academic work
- Discipline: Biblical studies
- Sub-discipline: New Testament studies
- Institutions: Yale University; Emory University

Carl Roark Holladay (born 18 October 1943) is an American scholar of the New Testament, Christian origins, and Hellenistic Judaism. He is the Charles Howard Candler Professor Emeritus of New Testament at Emory University's Candler School of Theology and an Elected Fellow of the American Academy of Arts and Sciences.

== Biography ==
Born October 18, 1943, Holladay was born and raised in Huntingdon, Tennessee. He started his undergraduate education at Freed–Hardeman College, where he met his wife, Donna. Moving to Texas, he continued his education at Abilene Christian University, receiving a Bachelor of Arts degree (summa cum laude) in 1965 and a Master of Divinity degree in 1969. At this Churches of Christ school he was mentored by important scholars from the Stone-Campbell Restoration tradition, including Abraham Malherbe, Everett Ferguson, and Thomas H. Olbricht. After completing a Master of Theology degree at Princeton Theological Seminary under Bertil Gärtner, Holladay moved to England to pursue a Doctor of Philosophy degree at the University of Cambridge. Studying with C. F. D. Moule and Ernst Bammel, he finished his dissertation in 1975, writing on the "divine man" in Hellenistic Judaism and early Christianity.

After beginning his teaching career at Yale Divinity School in 1975, Holladay came to Candler School of Theology at Emory University in 1980, where he taught until his retirement in 2019. In addition to teaching New Testament, he served as academic dean for almost a decade. In 2002 he was named Charles Howard Candler Professor of New Testament.

Among Holladay’s many scholarly contributions are his critical editions of Hellenistic Jewish authors and his work on New Testament Christology and Luke-Acts.

== Selected honors ==
- F. J. A. Hort Memorial Fund Award, University of Cambridge, 1973
- Elected to membership in Studiorum Novi Testamenti Societas, 1979
- Fulbright Senior Scholar Award, Eberhard-Karls Universität, Tübingen, 1994–95
- Henry T. Luce, III, Fellow in Theology, Association of Theological Schools, 1999-2000
- Distinguished Alumni Award, Abilene Christian University, 2003
- President, Studiorum Novi Testamenti Societas, 2016–17
- Elected to membership in American Academy of Arts and Sciences, 2017

== Selected works ==
- THEIOS ANER in Hellenistic Judaism: A Critique of the Use of This Category in New Testament Christology. Society of Biblical Literature Dissertation Series, No. 40. Missoula, MT: Scholars Press, 1977.
- Commentary on First Corinthians. Austin, Texas: R. B. Sweet Publishing Co., 1978.
- Biblical Exegesis: A Beginner’s Handbook. (Co-authored with John H. Hayes.) Atlanta: John Knox Press, 1982/London: SCM Press, 1983. (Rev. ed., 1987; 3rd ed., 2007.)
- Fragments from Hellenistic Jewish Authors. Volume I: Historians. Society of Biblical Literature Texts and Translations, No. 20; Pseudepigrapha Series, No. 10. Chico, CA: Scholars Press, 1983.
- Preaching the New Common Lectionary. (Co-authored with Fred B. Craddock, John H. Hayes, and Gene M. Tucker.) Nashville: Abingdon Press, 1984-87.
- Fragments from Hellenistic Jewish Authors. Volume II: Poets. Society of Biblical Literature Texts and Translations, No. 30; Pseudepigrapha Series, No. 12. Atlanta: Scholars Press, 1989.
- Preaching Through the Christian Year. (Co-authored with Fred B. Craddock, John H. Hayes, and Gene M. Tucker.) Philadelphia: Trinity Press International, 1992-94.
- Fragments from Hellenistic Jewish Authors. Volume III: Aristobulus. Society of Biblical Literature Texts and Translations, No. 39; Pseudepigrapha Series, No. 13. Atlanta: Scholars Press, 1995.
- Fragments from Hellenistic Jewish Authors. Volume IV: Orphica. Society of Biblical Literature Texts and Translations, No. 40; Pseudepigrapha Series, No. 14. Atlanta: Scholars Press, 1996.
- A Critical Introduction to the New Testament: Interpreting the Message and Meaning of Jesus Christ. Nashville: Abingdon Press, 2005.
- Acts: A Commentary. New Testament Library. Louisville: Westminster John Knox Press, 2016.
- Introduction to the New Testament: Reference Edition. Waco, Texas: Baylor University Press, 2017.
