= C. H. Dodd =

Welsh biblical scholar and theologian (1884–1973)

The Reverend C. H. Dodd CH FBA
- Born: Charles Harold Dodd; 7 April 1884; Wrexham, Wales
- Died: 21 September 1973 (aged 89); Goring-on-Thames, England

Ecclesiastical career
- Religion: Christianity (Congregationalist)
- Ordained: 1912

Academic background
- Education: University College, Oxford; Mansfield College, Oxford
- Influences: Adolf von Harnack; Martin Heidegger; Rudolf Otto

Academic work
- Discipline: Biblical studies
- Sub-discipline: New Testament studies
- Institutions: Mansfield College, Oxford; Victoria University of Manchester; Jesus College, Cambridge
- Doctoral students: W. D. Davies
- Notable ideas: Realized eschatology
- Influenced: G. B. Caird; David Daube

Charles Harold Dodd CH FBA (7 April 1884 – 21 September 1973) was a Welsh New Testament scholar and influential Protestant theologian. He is known for promoting "realized eschatology", the belief that Jesus' references to the kingdom of God meant a present reality rather than a future apocalypse. He was influenced by Martin Heidegger and Rudolf Otto.

== Life ==
Dodd was born on 7 April 1884 in the Welsh town of Wrexham, Denbighshire. He was the elder brother of the historian A. H. Dodd, the classicist P. W. Dodd and the teacher E. E. Dodd. He studied classics at University College, Oxford, from 1902. After graduating in 1906 he spent a year in Berlin, where he studied under the influential Adolf von Harnack.

He studied for the ministry at Mansfield College, Oxford, and was ordained in 1912. He was a Congregationalist minister for three years in Warwick, before going into academia. From 1915 he was Yates Lecturer in New Testament at Oxford. He became Rylands Professor of Biblical Criticism and Exegesis at the Victoria University of Manchester in 1930. He was Norris–Hulse Professor of Divinity at the University of Cambridge from 1935, becoming emeritus in 1949. His students from Cambridge include David Daube and W. D. Davies. The three together, each through his own work, ushered in changes in New Testament studies that led to the New Perspective on Paul and the scholarship of Davies's student, E. P. Sanders.

He directed the work of the New English Bible translators, from 1950.

He was elected a fellow of the British Academy in 1946. He was appointed to the Order of the Companions of Honour in 1961.

Dodd died on 21 September 1973 in Goring-on-Thames, Oxfordshire, England. His daughter Rachel married the Old Testament scholar Eric William Heaton in 1951.

== Works ==
=== Books ===
- Dodd, Charles H. (1920). The Meaning of Paul for Today. London: Allen and Unwin. OCLC 263558031.
- ——— (n.d.). The Gospel in the New Testament. London: The National Sunday School Union.
- ——— (1929). The Authority of the Bible. Library of constructive theology. London: HarperCollins. OCLC 559048103.
- ——— (1931). The Bible and Its Background. London: George Allen & Unwin. OCLC 931312025.
- ——— (1932). Epistle of Paul to the Romans. Moffatt New Testament commentary. New York: Harper & Row. OCLC 2685372.
- ——— (1932). The Framework of the Gospel Narrative. Edinburgh: T & T Clark. OCLC 643640621.
- ——— (1932). There and Back Again. Tales, etc. London: Hodder & Stoughton. OCLC 559049636.
- ——— (1933). The Mind of Paul: A Psychological Approach. Manchester: John Rylands Library. OCLC 1027034524.
- ——— (1935). The Bible and the Greeks. London: Hodder & Stoughton. OCLC 362655.
- ——— (1935). The Parables of the Kingdom. London: Nisbet. ISBN 9780006251941. OCLC 815611100.
- ——— (1935). The Apostolic Preaching and Its Developments: Three Lectures with an Eschatology and History: three lectures with an appendix on eschatology and history. New York: Harper. OCLC 301542028.
- ——— (1937). The First Epistle of John and the Fourth Gospel. Manchester: Manchester University Press. OCLC 15165498.
- ——— (1938). History and the Gospel. New York: Charles Scribner's Sons. OCLC 865693.
- ——— (1941). How to Read the Gospels. London: Press & Publications Board of the Church Assembly. OCLC 611543091.
- ——— (1946). The Bible Today. Cambridge: Cambridge University Press. OCLC 474984013.
- ——— (1946). The Johannine Epistles. Moffatt New Testament commentary. London: Hodder and Stoughton. OCLC 1068159111.
- ——— (1950). About the Gospels. Cambridge: Cambridge University Press. OCLC 2928350.
- ——— (1951). The Coming of Christ: Four Broadcast Addresses for the Season of Advent. Cambridge: Cambridge University Press. OCLC 65014900.
- ——— (1951). Gospel and Law: The Relation of Faith and Ethics in Early Christianity. Bampton Lectures at Columbia University. Vol. 3. New York: Columbia University Press. OCLC 383749.
- ——— (1952). According to the Scriptures: The Substructure of New Testament Theology. London: Nisbet. OCLC 382427.
- ——— (1952). Christianity and the Reconciliation of the Nations. Burge memorial lecture, 1951. London: SCM Press. OCLC 3579446.
- ———; Bratsiotis, Panagiotis I.; Bultmann, Rudolf; Clavier, Henri (1953). Man in God's Design According to the New Testament. General Meeting of the Studiorum Novi Testamenti Societas, Bern, 1952. Newcastle upon Tyne: Studiorum Novi Testamenti Societas. OCLC 2057337.
- ——— (1952). The Old Testament in the New. Ethel M. Wood Lecture delivered before the University of London on 4 March 1952. London: The Athlone Press.
- ——— (1953). The Interpretation of the Fourth Gospel. Cambridge: Cambridge University Press. ISBN 9780521095174. OCLC 383172.
- ——— (1953). New Testament Studies. Manchester: Manchester University Press. OCLC 4644418.
- ——— (1956). Benefits of His Passion. New York: Abingdon Press. OCLC 1375926.
- ——— (1958). The Leader: A Vivid Portrayal of the Last Years of the Life of Jesus. London: Independent Press. OCLC 810737417. - fiction
- ——— (1965). A New Testament Triptych: On Christ's Coming, His Gospel, His Passion. Cincinnati, OH: Forward Movement Publications. OCLC 4596408. - called Triptych on spine
- ——— (1963). Historical Tradition in the Fourth Gospel. Cambridge: Cambridge University Press. ISBN 9780521291231. OCLC 383174.
- ——— (1968). More New Testament Studies. Manchester: Manchester University Press. ISBN 9780719003332. OCLC 468418.
- ——— (1970). The Founder of Christianity. London, ON: Macmillan. ISBN 9780020846406. OCLC 150285484.

=== Journal articles ===
- ——— (1932). "The Framework of the Gospel Narrative". Expository Times. 43 (9): 396–400. doi:10.1177/001452463204300903. S2CID 171035798.
- ——— (January 1936). "A New Gospel". Bulletin of the John Rylands Library. 20 (1): 56–92. doi:10.7227/BJRL.20.1.3.
- ——— (1937). "The First Epistle of John and the Fourth Gospel". Bulletin of the John Rylands Library. 21 (1): 129–156. doi:10.7227/BJRL.21.1.5.
- ——— (1938). "The Gospel as History: A Reconsideration". Bulletin of the John Rylands Library. 22 (1): 122–143. doi:10.7227/BJRL.22.1.5.
- ——— (September 1954). "The Dialogue Form in the Gospels". Bulletin of the John Rylands Library. 37 (1): 54–67. doi:10.7227/BJRL.37.1.4.

Academic offices
Preceded by Arthur Peake	Rylands Professor of Biblical; Criticism and Exegesis; 1930–1935	Succeeded by Thomas Walter Manson
Preceded by Francis Crawford Burkitt	Norris–Hulse Professor of Divinity; 1935–1949	Succeeded by Herbert Henry Farmer
Awards
Preceded by H. Wheeler Robinson	Burkitt Medal; 1945	Succeeded by Theodore Henry Robinson
