= Richard Coggins =

British theologian

Richard J. Coggins (10 June 1929 – 19 November 2017) was a British Bible commentator who contributed to The Cambridge Bible Commentaries.

Coggins was Senior Lecturer in Old Testament Studies at King's College London, but retired by 2001.

== Works ==
- Samaritans and Jews: The Origins of Samaritanism Reconsidered (1975)
- The Books of Ezra and Nehemiah (Cambridge Bible Commentary) (1976)
- The First and Second Books of the Chronicles (Cambridge Bible Commentary) (1976)
- The First and Second Books of Esdras (Cambridge Bible Commentary) (with Michael Knibb) (1979)
- Who's Who in the Bible (1981)
- Israel's Prophetic Tradition: Essays in Honour of Peter R. Ackroyd (edited, with Anthony Phillips and Michael Knibb) (1982)
- Nahum, Obadiah, Esther: Israel among the Nations (International Theological Commentary) (with S. Paul Re'emi) (1986)
- Introducing the Old Testament (1990)
- Coggins, R. J.; Houlden, J. L., eds. (1990). A Dictionary of Biblical interpretation. London: SCM Press. ISBN 978-0334002949.
- A Dictionary of the Bible (with W.R.F. Browning and Graham N. Stanton) (1996)
- Sirach (Guides to the Apocrypha and Pseudepigrapha) (1998)
- Exodus (Epworth Commentaries) (2000)
- Isaiah (Oxford Bible Commentary) (2001)
- Six Minor Prophets Through the Centuries: Nahum, Habakkuk, Zephaniah, Haggai, Zechariah and Malachi (Wiley Blackwell Bible Commentaries) (with Jin H Han) (2011)
