= Sven Gustaf Hedin =

Swedish chemist and physiologist (1859–1933)

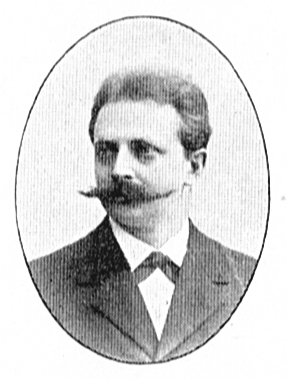
- Born: 6 October 1859; Alseda Parish, Jönköping County, Sweden
- Died: 11 July 1933 (aged 73); Uppsala, Sweden
- Burial place: Uppsala Old Cemetery
- Education: Uppsala University
- Occupation: Chemist
- Known for: Discovery of histidine

Sven Gustaf Hedin (6 October 1859 – 11 July 1933) was a Swedish chemist and physiologist credited with the discovery of histidine.

He was born in Alseda parish, Jönköping County. He began his studies in 1878 and received his bachelor's degree in 1881 at Uppsala University. In 1886 he received his doctorate in philosophy and doctorate of medicine in 1893 in Lund and docent in chemistry in 1886 and became a researcher (laborator) there in 1895. From 1900 to 1907 he was made head of the pathological chemistry division at the Lister Institute of Preventive Medicine in London, and professor of medicinal and physiological chemistry at Uppsala University in 1908. Hedin was a member of the Royal Physiographic Society in Lund (1896) and the Royal Swedish Academy of Sciences (1902). Among Hedin's many scientific theses are Om pyridinens platinabaser (1886) and Om trypsindigestionen (1893, both in Lund University's journal), Über die Bildung von Arginin aus Proteinkörpern (in Zeitschrift für physiologische Chemie, 1895) and other reports on the decomposition of protein in the same journal, Über die Permeabilität der Blutkörperchen (1897, in Archiv für die gesammte Physiologie), awarded the Alvarenga Prize, An explanation of the influence of acid and alkali on the autolysis of organs (in the Festschrift dedicated to Olof Hammarsten, 1906) along with contributions to The Journal of Physiology and Biochemical Journal regarding trypsin. Hedin was awarded the Björkénska priset in 1912.

He was the father-in-law of professor Harald Riesenfeld and uncle of literary historian Greta Hedin. Hedin died in Uppsala and is buried in Uppsala Old Cemetery.
