= Daniel Marguerat =

Swiss theologian and Biblical scholar (1943–2026

- Marguerat in August 2026
- Born: 30 October 1943; Lausanne, Switzerland
- Died: 3 November 2026 (aged 83)
- Education: University of Göttingen; University of Lausanne
- Occupations: Theologian; Biblical scholar

Daniel Marguerat (30 October 1943 – 3 November 2026) was a Swiss theologian and Biblical scholar.

Marguerat studied at the University of Göttingen and the University of Lausanne, earning a certificate of research in Biblical studies with a thesis titled Le jugement dans l’Évangile de Matthieu. He earned a doctorate at Lausanne in 1981. He then taught the New Testament at Lausanne from 1984 to 2008 and served as president of the Studiorum Novi Testamenti Societas from 2007 to 2008. Throughout his career, he was also a guest professor at the University of Geneva, the Université de Montréal, the Pontifical Biblical Institute, the University of Neuchâtel, and the Centre Sèvres.

Marguerat died on 3 November 2026, at the age of 83.

== Publications ==
- Les Actes des apôtres (2007, 2015)
- Un admirable christianisme, relire les Actes des apôtres (2013)
- Jésus et Matthieu : À la recherche du Jésus de l'histoire (2016)
- L'Historien de Dieu : Luc et les Actes des apôtres (2018)
- Vie et destin de Jésus de Nazareth (2019)
- Paul de Tarse : L'enfant terrible du christianisme (2023)
- L'Ange, souffle de l'invisible (2025)
- Saint Pierre entre histoire et légende (2026)
