= Kanellopoulos Institute of Chemistry and Agriculture =

Former research institute in Greece

- Ινστιτούτο Χημείας και Γεωργίας "Ν. Κανελλόπουλος"
- Established: 1938 (ceased operation in 1984)
- Research type: Basic, industrial and agricultural
- Field of research: Analytical chemistry Physical chemistry Agrochemistry; Edaphology
- Location: G. Lambraki & N. Kazantzaki, Drapetsona, Athens, Piraeus, Athens, Attica, GR 186 48, Greece; 37°56′42″N 23°37′16″E
- Affiliations: Greek Company of Chemical Products and Fertilisers (AEEChPL)
- Location within Piraeus

The Kanellopoulos Institute of Chemistry and Agriculture (Greek: Ινστιτούτο Χημείας και Γεωργίας "Ν. Κανελλόπουλος", Katharevousa: Ἰνστιτοῦτον Χημείας καὶ Γεωργίας "Ν. Κανελλόπουλος") is a former research institute in Drapetsona, Athens, Greece, which operated between 1938 and 1984 in affiliation with the Drapetsona-based Greek Company of Chemical Products and Fertilisers (Greek abbrev.: ΑΕΕΧΠΛ, romanized: AEEChPL).

The Kanellopoulos Institute was a sui generis institution in Greece. It was the first of its kind to combine high-profile basic research, research with applications in the chemical industry, and dissemination of agrochemical advances to the Greek populace.

== History ==
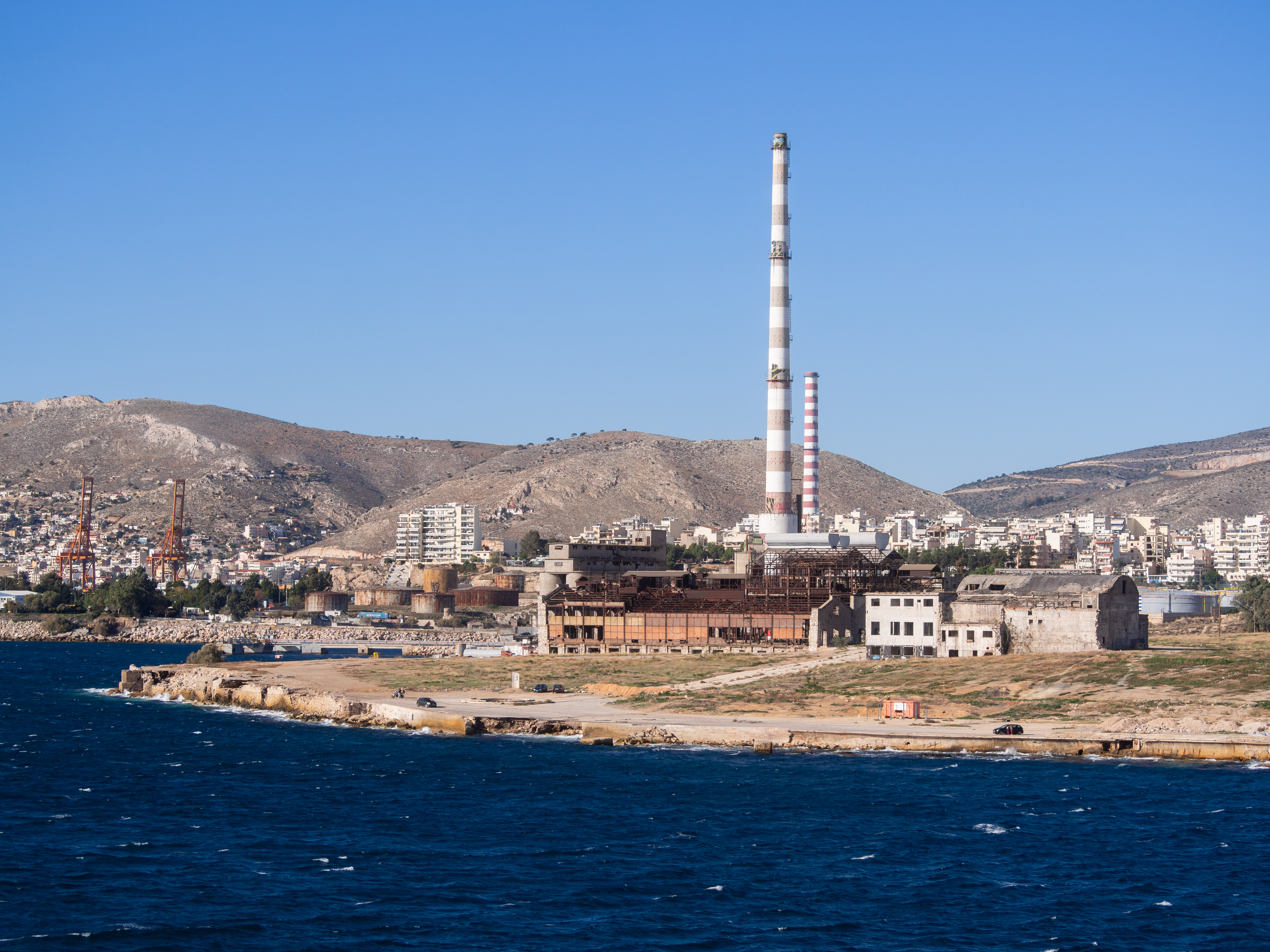
The abandoned AEEChPL complex in 2016 (view of west side, east side and Kanellopoulos Institute building not visible)

The idea for the creation of the Institute belonged to its nameshake, industrialist Nikolaos Kanellopoulos (1864–1936), one of the founders of AEEChPL. Construction commenced in 1936, as per the request and with the monetary sum Kanellopoulos bequeathed to the future Institute in his will. The institute was inaugurated in 1938, situated at the east side of the AEEChPL industrial complex in Drapetsona.

The institute's activities quickly attracted attention within Greece as well as abroad, with distinguished researchers such as Georg-Maria Schwab publishing in international chemical journals on the physico-chemical and analytical work conducted in the chemical laboratories at Kanellopoulos. At the same time, the edaphological investigations in the Institute helped modernise agriculture in Greece in the following 3 decades with the introduction of appropriate fertilisers and mapping-characterisation of the soils in major agricultural areas.

The Institute building was one among the severely damaged during WWII after the 1943 bombing of the industrial complex. Following repairs and the resumption of operation after the war, research in Kanellopoulos focused more on agrochemical over other chemical topics for the next years. The institute also published a periodical with relevant material called Agricultural Messenger (Greek: Ἀγροτικὸς Ταχυδρόμος).

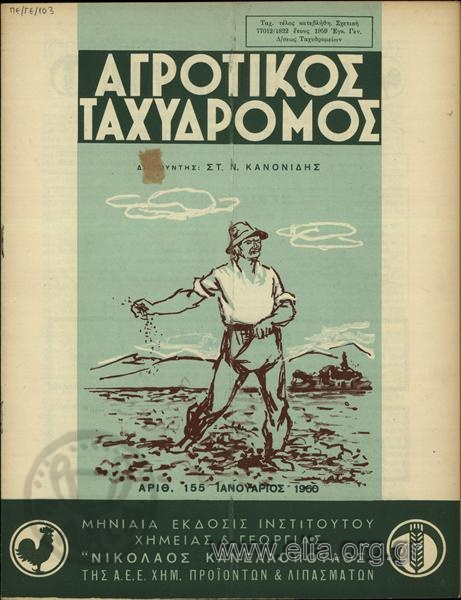
1960 issue of the Agricultural Messenger, the institute's periodical aiming to publicise agrochemical research among Greek farmers

In the early 1980s there was intense interest in the institute on assessing the environmental damage caused by the fertiliser plant and suggesting measures for the area's remediation. From 1984, the whole industrial complex faced economic difficulties and research in the Kanellopoulos Institute stopped; by 1993 AEEChPL was liquidated and the Drapetsona site abandoned. Since then the Institute building has been unused and fallen into grave disrepair.

== Departments ==
The institute was organised into three departments:

1. Department of Analytical Chemistry, tasked with performing more than 1200 assays per year for raw material going into the chemical industry; later incorporated the Laboratory of Instrumental Analysis, where research on the improvement of instrumental chemistry methods was conducted
2. Department of Industrial Oversight, examining the industrial processes of the plant (e.g. continuous flow procedures for the manufacturing of chemicals) and eventually monitoring the environmental impact thereof
3. Department of Edaphology, responsible for characterising of soils and providing recommendations on fertiliser use and better agricultural practice; it included the Laboratory of Pathophytology which researched plant disease and pests

Independently from the departments also operated the Laboratory of Metallurgy and the Laboratory of Physical Chemistry, which were respectively used for ore analysis and physico-chemical basic research.

The Kanellopoulos Institute was also famed for its library, at the time of its creation in 1938 perhaps the most complete collection of chemical literature in Greece.

== Notable people ==
- Elly Schwab-Agallidis, Greek physicist, researcher in the Laboratory of Physical Chemistry of the institute (1939–1949)
- Georg-Maria Schwab, German chemist, researcher in the Laboratory of Physical Chemistry of the institute (1939–1949)
- Georgios Drikos, Greek chemist, director of the Department of Industrial Oversight and later also vice-director of the institute (1938–1962)
