= Takamitsu Muraoka =

Japanese orientalist (1938–2026)

- 村岡 崇光
- Born: 9 February 1938; Hiroshima, Japan
- Died: 10 February 2026 (aged 88)
- Education: Doctor of Philosophy
- Alma mater: Hebrew University of Jerusalem
- Occupations: Linguist, Hebraist, writer, university teacher
- Employer(s): Leiden University (1991–2003); University of Manchester (1970–1980); University of Melbourne (1980–1991)
- Awards: Fellow of the Australian Academy of the Humanities (1984); Burkitt Medal (2017)

Takamitsu Muraoka (村岡 崇光, Muraoka Takamitsu; 9 February 1938 – 10 February 2026) was a Japanese Semitist. He was Chair of Hebrew, Israelite Antiquities, and Ugaritic at Leiden University in the Netherlands from 1991 to 2003 and is most notable for his studies of Hebrew and Aramaic linguistics and the ancient translations of the Bible, notably of the Septuagint.

== Education ==
After studying general linguistics and biblical languages under the late Prof. Masao Sekine at Tokyo University of Education (now University of Tsukuba), he studied at the Hebrew University of Jerusalem, completing his dissertation Emphasis in Biblical Hebrew with the late Prof. C. Rabin as supervisor, and obtaining his Ph.D. in 1970.

== Career ==
Muraoka taught Semitic languages including Modern Hebrew as Lecturer in Manchester University, U.K. (1970–1980), as Professor of Middle Eastern studies at Melbourne University (1980–1991), Australia, then moved in 1991 to Leiden University (1991–2003), The Netherlands, as Professor of the Hebrew Language and Literature, the Israelite Antiquities, and the Ugaritic language. In addition, he was editor of Abr-Nahrain [now Ancient Near Eastern Studies] 1980–1992, and also edited or co-edited volumes on Biblical Hebrew Semantics, the Aramaic of Qumran, and the Hebrew of Qumran. From 1995–2008 he gave leadership to the Semantics of Ancient Hebrew Database project as its Chairman. His comprehensive syntax of the Koine Greek of the Septuagint appeared in 2016. He co-founded, in 2000, the Dutch-Japanese-Indonesian Dialogue against the background of the Pacific War. He was a representative of The Biblical Church in The Netherlands.

== Retirement and death ==
After retiring in 2003 from the Leiden chair, he began yearly lecture tours teaching biblical languages and the Septuagint as a volunteer for a minimum of five weeks in Asian countries which suffered under Japanese militarism in the 20th century. His thoughts and reflections on this yearly teaching ministry up to the year 2015 can now be read in English in "My Via dolorosa: Along the trails of the Japanese imperialism in Asia" (AuthorHouse U.K. 2016). From 2021 he taught the same subjects online.

Muraoka died on 10 February 2026, one day after his 88th birthday.

== Honors ==
In the academic year 2001–2002 he was a Forschungpreisträger of Alexander von Humboldt Foundation and in that capacity a visiting professor at the Faculty of Divinity at Göttingen University, Germany. He was elected a Corresponding Fellow of the Australian Academy of Humanities in 1984, and since 2006 Honorary Fellow of the Academy of the Hebrew Language. On 27 September 2017 he was awarded the Burkitt Medal for Hebrew Bible Studies by the British Academy, which judged that over the past six decades he had made outstanding contributions to the study of the Hebrew grammar and syntax, and the Septuagint (an ancient Greek translation of the Old Testament).

== Selected publications ==
Muraoka's major publications (only English publications are mentioned) include:

- Emphatic Words and Structures in Biblical Hebrew (1985)
- Modern Hebrew for Biblical Scholars (1982, 1995)
- A Greek-Hebrew/Aramaic Index to I Esdras (1984)
- Classical Syriac for Hebraists (1987, 2nd revised ed. 2013)
- A Grammar of Biblical Hebrew [P. Joüon's grammar translated from French and extensively revised and updated] (1991, 2006)
- A Greek-English Lexicon of the Septuagint (Twelve Prophets) (1993)
- Classical Syriac: A Basic Grammar with a Chrestomathy (1997, 2005)
- With B. Porten, A Grammar of Egyptian Aramaic (1998, 2003)
- A Hebrew/Aramaic-Greek Index Keyed to Hatch and Redpath's Septuagint Concordance (1998)
- A Greek-English Lexicon of the Septuagint (Chiefly of the Pentateuch and the Twelve Prophets) (2002)
- A Greek-English Lexicon of the Septuagint [covering the entire Septuagint] (2009)
- A Greek-Hebrew/Aramaic Two-way Index to the Septuagint (2010)
- A Grammar of Qumran Aramaic (2011)
- An Introduction to Egyptian Aramaic (2012)
- A Biblical Aramaic Reader with an Outline Grammar (2015)
- A Syntax of Septuagint Greek (2016).
- A Biblical Hebrew Reader with an Outline Grammar (2017)
- Jacob of Serugh's Hexaemeron. Edited and translated. 2018. Leuven.
- A Syntax of Qumran Hebrew. 2020. Leuven.
- Why Read the Bible in the Original Languages? 2020. Leuven
- The Community Rule 1QS, 1QSa and 1QSb. A philological commentary. 2022. Leuven.
- The Books of Hosea and Micah in Hebrew and Greek. 2022. Leuven.
- Wisdom of Ben Sira. 2023. Leuven.
- The Wisdom of Solomon in the Septuagint. 2024. Leuven.
- Appendices to the Septuagint Book of Daniel 2025. Leuven.
- Articles in G. Khan (ed.), Encyclopaedia of Hebrew and Hebrew Linguistics, 2013, Leiden:
  - “Community Rule (1QS),” I.493a-95b;
  - “Copula: Biblical Hebrew,” I 623a-24b;
  - “Emphatic Lamed,” I 820b-821a;
  - “Existential: Biblical Hebrew,” I.881b-884b;
  - “Isaiah Scroll (1Isaa),” II.343b-348a;
  - “Neuter,” II.822b-23b;
  - “Phrasal verb: Pre-modern Hebrew,” III.141b-42a;
  - “Prepositional verbs,” III.219a-20a;
  - “Prophetic perfect,” III 279a-80a.

== External Reference ==
- Martin F.J. Baasten, Takamitsu Muraoka (1938 – 2026), Buried History 2025 – Volume 61 by the Journal of the Australian Institute of Archaeology
