= W. R. F. Browning =

Anglican clergyman and theologian

Wilfred Robert Francis Browning is an Anglican clergyman and theologian. He was Canon Residentiary of Christ Church Cathedral, Oxford and of Blackburn Cathedral. He is now an honorary priest and honorary canon. He previous lectured in New Testament Studies at the Oxford University Department for Continuing Education and at Cuddesdon College in Oxford.

== The Gospel According to St. Luke (1960) ==
Browning's The Gospel According to St. Luke was published by The Macmillan Company in 1960. A non-technical commentary on the Gospel of Luke, the book emphasises typological interpretations of the Bible. Reviewing the book in 1961, Joseph M. Gettys argued "that neither Jesus nor Luke was as conscious of the proposed schematic typological pattern as is Canon Browning", but concluded the book would "serve a useful purpose ... for it has the virtues of honest scholarship and readability."

== The Anglican Synthesis (1965) ==
The Anglican Synthesis, edited by Browning and published in 1965 by Peter Smith, is a collection of essays intended as a re-examination of Catholic and Protestant elements in Anglicanism. Its concluding essay argues that a true Anglican synthesis would not be a compromise but rather "utterly Catholic and utterly Protestant". Reviewing the book in 1966, C. J. Sansbury wrote "It's an exciting idea, but there is not much real dialogue in this book; inevitably, perhaps, it is a statement of the beliefs which certain individuals hold on certain subjects."

== A Dictionary of the Bible (1996) ==
A Dictionary of the Bible, by Browning with Graham Stanton and Richard Coggins as consultant editors, was published by Oxford University Press in 1996. The dictionary comprises short entries on people, places, events and institutions in the Bible, as well as modern scholars and early translators of the Bible, other figures from the Biblical world, the Church Fathers, and methods of exegesis. A 1996 review in the Expository Times described the entries as "occasionally misleading" and recommended the book to "students at the beginning of biblical work."

== Books ==
- W. R. F. Browning, The Gospel According to St. Luke (The Macmillan Company, 1960)
- W. R. F. Browning (editor), The Anglican Synthesis (Peter Smith, 1965)
- W. R. F. Browning with Graham Stanton and Richard Coggins, A Dictionary of the Bible (Oxford University Press, 1996)
- W. R. F. Browning, Saint Luke, Morehouse Publishing
