= A. H. Dodd =

British historian

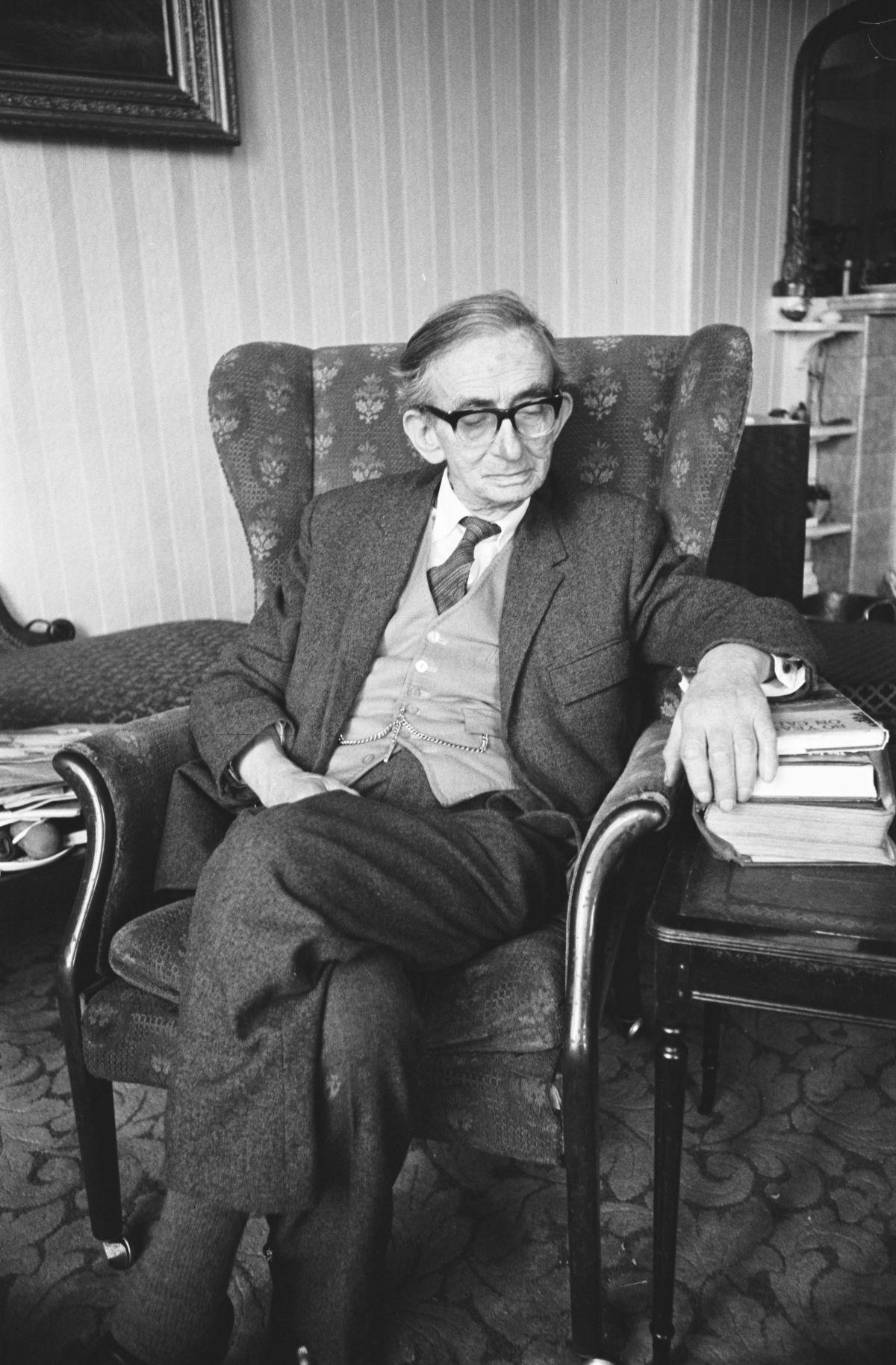
Image of Professor A H Dodd

Professor Arthur Herbert Dodd (1891 – 21 May 1975) was an academic historian who taught and published widely, specialising in the politics of the Tudor and Stuart periods, Welsh history, and the history of the Industrial Revolution.

Dodd was born and brought up in Wrexham, Denbighshire, where his father Charles was a headmaster at Victoria School. It was a family of modest means but studious inclinations; one of his three brothers, C. H. Dodd, achieved particular distinction as a New Testament scholar. Having attended Grove Park Grammar School in the town he went up to New College, Oxford in 1911, and after graduating in history, joined the Royal Army Medical Corps (2nd West Lancashire Field Ambulance) in 1914 with whom he saw active service in France.

Dodd was appointed lecturer in history at the University College of North Wales in 1919, and succeeded Sir John Edward Lloyd as professor of history there in 1930, remaining until his retirement in 1958. He also taught in the Extra-Mural Department, and was stalwart of the Workers' Educational Association and the Cambrian Archaeological Association. In retirement he was curator of Bangor Museum, and taught at Bangor Normal College (then St Mary's Educational College, now part of the University of Bangor).

He was a founder member of the Denbighshire Historical Society, and edited a history of Wrexham to coincide with the Borough Centenary Celebration in 1957. He was made a freeman of the Borough of Wrexham in 1963. A centenary celebration of his birth was held in Wrexham in 1991.

Though not a native speaker, Dodd was a supporter of the Welsh language and brought up his children as Welsh speakers, at a time when the language had far less social status.

== Bibliography ==
- The Industrial Revolution in North Wales (1933)
- Studies in Stuart Wales (1952)
- The Growth of Responsible Government from James the First to Victoria (1956)
- Life in Elizabethan England (1961)
- A History of Caernarvonshire (1968)
- Life in Wales (1972)
- A Short History of Wales (1977) (published posthumously)
