= Xavier Léon-Dufour =

French Jesuit biblical scholar (1912–2007)

Xavier Léon-Dufour (Paris, 7 March 1912–13 November 2007) was a French Jesuit biblical scholar and theologian. He was professor of the Bible at the centre Sèvres and director of collections at éditions du Seuil and éditions du Cerf.

Xavier Léon-Dufour made the choice to become a priest at the age of 17. While a priest, he worked with the resistance in the Southwest network during World War II.

In the years 1948-1957 he was a lecturer of the Holy Bible in the Jesuit theological faculty of Enghien in Belgium. From there, he moved to Lyon-Fourvière. He was a consultor of the Pontifical Biblical Commission in Rome and a member of the New Testament study society - Studiorum Novi Testamenti Societas. He published in theological magazines: "Recherches de Science Religieuse" and "New Testament Studies".

He is best known for his 'Vocabulary of Biblical Theology'. This work, published in 1962, remains, fifty years later, a reference book for students in theology. He also did important work on the synoptic gospels and on the gospel according to John. He took part in the doctrinal controversies that followed the Second Vatican Council.

He was president of the Studiorum Novi Testamenti Societas in 1980.

== Works ==
- X. Léon-Dufour; K. Romaniuk (1994). Słownik teologii biblijnej (4 ed.). Poznan: Pallottinum. ISBN 83-7014-224-9.
- K. Romaniuk (1981). Słownik Nowego Testamentu (II ed.). Poznan: Wydawnictwo Św. Wojciecha. ISBN 83-7015-048-9.
- Dorota Szczerba; Kraków (2007). Ewangelia - wezwanie do działania i modlitwy. Wydawnictwo Salwator. ISBN 978-83-60703-36-6.
- Les évangiles et l'histoire de Jésus. Paris: Editions du Seuil. 1963. pp. 526. and its English version: J.H. McHugh (1968). The Gospels and the Jesus of History. London: Collins. p. 288.
- Résurrection de Jésus et message pascal. Paryż: Editions du Seuil. 1971. p. 389.
- Le partage du pain eucharistique selon le Nouveau Testament. Paris: Editions du Seuil. 1982. p. 372.
- Lecture de l'évangile selon Jean. Vol. 1–4. Paris: Editions du Seuil. 1988–1996.
- Mort pour nos péchés: recherche pluridisciplinaire sur la signification rédemptrice de la mort du Christ
