= Percy Dodd =

British academic

Percy William Dodd (1889 – 20 May 1931) was a British classicist who taught at the Universities of Leeds and Oxford.

He was born in 1889. He was the third son of Charles Dodd, of Wrexham, and was educated at Grove Park School, Wrexham before matriculating at Jesus College, Oxford as an Open Classical Scholar in 1907. He obtained a second-class degree in Literae Humaniores in 1911 and became a lecturer in classics at the University of Leeds. During World War I, Dodd was a captain in the West Yorkshire Regiment and served in France. His war service, however, affected his health and he suffered from frequent bouts of illness thereafter.

Dodd was elected as Fellow and assistant tutor in philosophy at Jesus College in 1919, becoming senior tutor in 1926. He was described by the Scottish classical scholar Alexander Souter as an "enthusiastic investigator" of Roman Britain, whose published report of excavations in Yorkshire were "a model of their kind". He died on 20 May 1931. He left a substantial sum to the college in his will, which is used to support non-academic travel by college undergraduates.
