= Eduard Schweizer =

Swiss biblical scholar (1913–2006)

Eduard Schweizer (1913–2006) was a Swiss New Testament scholar who taught at the University of Zurich for an extended period. He won the Burkitt Medal for Biblical Studies in 1996.

== Biography ==
Schweitzer studied Protestant theology at the University of Marburg, the University of Zurich and the University of Basel; in these institutions he was a student of Rudolf K. Bultmann, H. Emil Brunner and Karl Barth. He received his degree in theology in 1938 and became a Protestant Pastor in Nesslau. From 1941 he taught New Testament studies at the University of Zurich (1941–1946), the University of Mainz (1946–1949) and the University of Bonn (1949–1950). In 1950 he was appointed to the New Testament chair of the University of Zurich, where he was Rector from 1964 to 1966; he also chaired the Studiorum Novi Testamenti Societas in 1969.

He retired from teaching in 1979 and died in Zurich in 2006.

== Works ==
- Jesus (1971)
- The Good News According to Mark ISBN 0-8042-0250-8
- The Good News According to Matthew
- The Good News According to Luke ISBN 0-664-22361-3
- The Church as the Body of Christ, 1964
- Church Order in the New Testament, 1979, ISBN 0-334-00224-9
- The Lord's Supper in the New Testament
- The Spirit of God (Holy Spirit ISBN 0-334-02051-4)
- A Theological Introduction to the New Testament ISBN 0-281-04602-6
