= Alberto Soggin =

Italian biblical scholar

- Born: 10 March 1926
- Died: 27 October 2010 (aged 84)
- Occupation: biblical scholar
- Notable work: see Works
- Awards: Burkitt Medal

Jan Alberto Soggin (10 March 1926 – 27 October 2010) was a leading Italian biblical scholar.

== Early life ==
Soggin was born on 10 March 1926. He took his first degrees in law at the Sapienza University of Rome and in theology at the Waldensian Theological Seminary in Rome.

== Academic career ==
He became professor for Old Testament, Hebrew, and Greek at the University of Buenos Aires, the Hebrew University of Jerusalem and then until his retirement at the Waldensian Theological Seminary and at the Sapienza. Among other things he was a fellow at Princeton Theological Seminary, at St John's College, Cambridge and at the Hebrew University. He lectured widely and published various articles and books. He was a member of the editorial board of Henoch, Vetus Testamentum and of Zeitschrift für die Alttestamentliche Wissenschaft.

In 2007, he was awarded the Burkitt Medal by the British Academy. It is granted 'in recognition of special service to Biblical Studies'.

== Death ==
Soggin died on 27 October 2010.

== Works ==
- (2001) Israel in the Biblical Period: Institutions, Festivals, Ceremonies, Rituals (transl. John Bowden, Edinburgh: T. & T. Clark, p. xiii, 209, ISBN 0-567-08811-1)
- (1999) An Introduction to the History of Israel and Judah (transl. John Bowden, 3rd ed., London: SCM, p. xxii, 442, ISBN 0-334-02788-8)
- (1989) Introduction to the Old Testament: From Its Origins to the Closing of the Alexandrian Canon (transl. John Bowden, 3rd ed., Philadelphia: Westminster, p. xxxvi, 508, ISBN 0-664-21385-5)
- (1987) The Prophet Amos: A Translation and Commentary (transl. John Bowden, London: SCM, p. xix, 150, ISBN 0-334-00053-X)
- (1987) Judges: A Commentary (transl. John Bowden, 2nd ed., London: SCM, p. xx, 309, ISBN 0-334-02108-1)
- (1975) Old Testament and Oriental Studies (Rome: Biblical Institute, p. xv, 256)
- (1972) Joshua: A Commentary (transl. R.A. Wilson, London: SCM / Philadelphia: Westminster, p. xvii, 245)
- (1965) When the Judges Ruled (London: United Society for Christian Literature - Lutterworth Press / New York: Association Press, p. 80)
