= Harald Riesenfeld =

Swedish theologian (1913–2008)

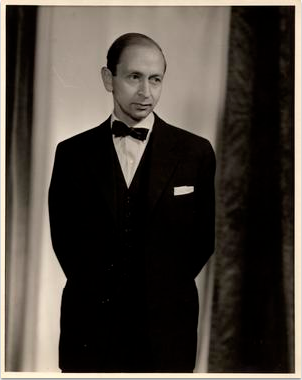
- Born: 8 February 1913; Freiburg im Breisgau, Germany
- Died: 9 July 2008 (aged 95); Uppsala, Sweden
- Burial place: Bjursås, Dalarna, Sweden
- Other name: Ernst Harald Riesenfeld
- Education: Uppsala University
- Occupations: Theologian, scholar

Ernst Harald Riesenfeld (8 February 1913 – 9 July 2008) was a Swedish theologian and Bible scholar, best known for his exegesis of the New Testament.

== Biography ==
Riesenfeld was born in Freiburg im Breisgau, Germany, to Ernst Riesenfeld and Johanna (Hanna) née Johansson; his family moved back to Sweden when he was a child. He later studied at Uppsala University and after receiving his master's degree in philosophy began to study theology. From 1942 to 1945, he was head of the Uppsala Student Union. After receiving his doctorate in 1947, he became a docent in New Testament exegesis with his dissertation Jésus transfiguré. He then began to preach in Loka, Örebro County. He reached the rank of captain in the I 13 Dalarna Regiment in 1952 after having been made an officer in 1941. In 1953, Riesenfeld became professor of New Testament exegesis at Uppsala University, a post he held until 1979. From 1955 to 1959 he was dean of the faculty of theology there, and in 1979 became acting professor of exegesis at the University of Tübingen.

From 1972 to 1981, he served on the committee for the Swedish translation of the Bible and participated as an expert in the 1981 Swedish translation of the New Testament (NT 81), which has been incorporated into the newer Bibel 2000.

In addition to his permanent positions, Riesenfeld has also held several other positions, including first vice-president of Sveriges scoutförbund (1954–1956). He was a member of several international research societies, and received an honorary doctorate in theology from the University of Paris in 1959, and later from the University of St Andrews. He was a member of the Royal Society of Arts and Sciences of Uppsala, Royal Society of the Humanities at Uppsala, Nathan Söderblom Society, Royal Society of Sciences in Uppsala, Royal Norwegian Society of Sciences and Letters in Trondheim, and a corresponding member of the British Academy. In 1968–1969 he was president of Studiorum Novi Testamenti Societas, an international society of New Testament scholars. Riesenfeld was made an honorary member of the student association Föreningen Heimdal in 1961 and was inspektor of the Västmanlands-Dala student nation from 1966 to 1981.

As a result of developments in the Church of Sweden beginning in the 1950s, Riesenfeld converted to Roman Catholicism in 1984.

In 1944, he married the librarian of Uppsala University Library, Blenda Hedin (1913–2008), daughter of professor Sven Gustaf Hedin and Gunhild Sanne. He was the nephew of physiology professor Johan Erik (Jöns) Johansson and geologist Harald Johansson.

Riesenfeld died in Uppsala, Sweden, in 2008 and is buried in Bjursås, Dalarna.
