= Werner Kümmel =

German New Testament scholar and academic (1905–1995)

Werner Georg Kümmel
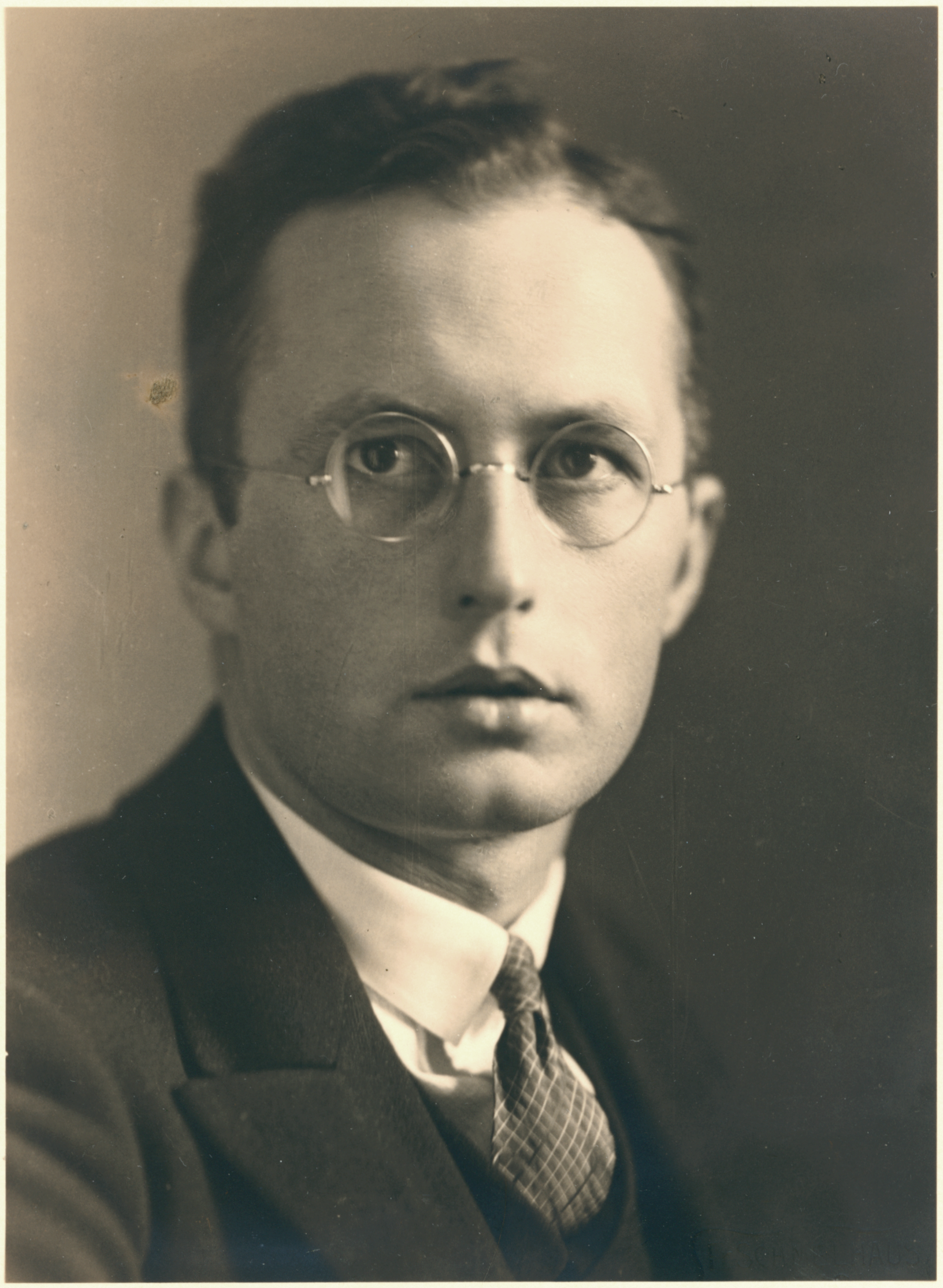
- Portrait of Werner Georg Kümmel (1905–1995)
- Born: 16 May 1905; Heidelberg
- Died: 9 July 1995 (aged 90); Mainz
- Occupations: New Testament scholar and professor

Academic background
- Education: Heidelberg, Berlin and Marburg
- Thesis: Römer 7 und die Bekehrung des Paulus (1928)

Academic work
- Institutions: University of Marburg
- Notable works: Introduction to the New Testament

Werner Georg Kümmel (Heidelberg 16 May 1905 - Mainz 9 July 1995) was a German New Testament scholar and professor at the University of Marburg.

== Biography ==
Kümmel was the son of the Heidelberg doctor Werner Kümmel and his first wife Marie (a daughter of the historian Heinrich Ulmann). He was a grandson of the civil engineer Werner Kümmel and a nephew of the art historian Otto Kümmel, as well as a great-grandson of the physician Jacob Henle through his mother.

From 1923 to 1928 he studied Protestant theology in Heidelberg, Berlin and Marburg, graduating in Heidelberg. He wrote his dissertation on Romans 7 in 1928, under the supervision of Martin Dibelius. He then worked at universities in England, followed by Marburg (1930–1932), where he was assistant to Hans von Soden, Zurich (1932–1950), Mainz (1951/1952) and Marburg again (1952–1973). At Marburg he succeeded Rudolf Bultmann, and worked until his retirement in 1973 as a New Testament scholar.

Kümmel undertook the editing of Jewish writings from Hellenistic-Roman times. His Einleitung in das Neue Testament (Introduction to the New Testament) was influential, and competed with the conservatism of Wilhelm Michaelis and the Catholic perspective of Alfred Wikenhauser in their works of the same title.

The Bonn New Testament scholar Erich Gräßer was a student of Kümmel's.

== Works ==
=== Thesis ===
- Kümmel, Werner Georg (1929). Römer 7 und die Bekehrung des Paulus (Thesis). München: C. Kaiser. ISBN 9783459008933. OCLC 721284094.

=== Books ===
- ——— (1943). Kirchenbegriff und Geschichtsbewußtsein in der Urgemeinde und bei Jesus. Symbolae biblicae Upsalienses. Vol. 1. Zürich: Uppsala. OCLC 882484040.
- ——— (1945). Verheißung und Erfüllung: Untersuchungen zur eschatologischen Verkündigung Jesu [Promise and Fulfillment: the eschatological message of Jesus)]. Abhandlungen zur Theologie des Alten und Neuen Testaments. Vol. 6. Basel: Majer. OCLC 883120857. – (trans. pub. by London: SCM Press, 1956)
- ——— (1948). Bild des Menschen im Neuen Testament [Man in the New Testament)]. Abhandlungen zur Theologie des Alten und Neuen Testaments. Vol. 13. Zürich: Zwingli-Verlag. OCLC 186253335. – (trans. pub. by London: Epworth, 1961)).
- ——— (1958). Das Neue Testament: Geschichte der Erforschung seiner Probleme [The New Testament: the history of the investigation of its problems)]. Orbis academicus Band III/3. Freiburg / München: Verlag Karl Alber. OCLC 163719628. – (trans. pub. by London: SCM Press, 1972)
- ——— (1965). Gräßer, Erich; Merk, Otto; Fritz, Adolf (eds.). Heilsgeschehen und Geschichte: Gesammelte Aufsätze 1933–1964. Marburger Theologische Studien. Vol. 3. Marburg: N. G. Elwert. OCLC 24839201.
- ——— (1969). Die Theologie des Neuen Testaments nach seinen Hauptzeugen: Jesus, Paulus, Johannes [The Theology of the New Testament according to its major witnesses: Jesus – Paul – John)]. Grundrisse zum Neuen Testament. Vol. 3. Göttingen: Vandenhoeck & Ruprecht. OCLC 495551082. – (trans. pub. by London: SCM Press, 1972)
- ——— (1970). Das Neue Testament im 20: Jahrhundert; Ein Forschungsbericht. Stuttgarter Bibelstudien. Vol. 50. Stuttgart: Verlag Katholisches Bibelwerk. ISBN 9783460035010. OCLC 310457.
- ——— (1973). Einleitung in das Neue Testament [Introduction to the New Testament)] (17 ed.). Heidelberg: Quelle & Meyer. – (It is a complete revision of Paul Feine and Johannes Behm's book, first published in 1918; from 1973 on will it have Kümmel's name as its main author) (trans. by Howard Clark Kee in 1993, Nashville: Abingdon Press)
- ——— (1974). Jesu Antwort an Johannes den Täufer. Ein Beispiel zum Methodenproblem in der Jesusforschung. Sitzungsberichte der Wissenschaftlichen Gesellschaft an der Johann Wolfgang Goethe-Universität Frankfurt am Main. Vol. 11, 4. Wiesbaden. ISBN 9783515019378. OCLC 780662711.
- ——— (1978). Gräßer, Erich; Merk, Otto (eds.). Heilsgeschehen und Geschichte: Gesammelte Aufsätze 1965-1977. Marburger theologische Studien. Vol. 16. Marburg: N. G. Elwert. OCLC 24839201.
- ——— (1984). Jesus der Menschensohn?. Sitzungsberichte der Wissenschaftlichen Gesellschaft an der Johann Wolfgang Gœthe-Universität Frankfurt am Main. Vol. 20, 3. Wiesbaden: F. Steiner. ISBN 9783515042260. OCLC 461906198.
- ——— (1985). Merklein, Helmut (ed.). Dreißig Jahre Jesusforschung (1950–1980). Bonner biblische Beiträge. Vol. 60. Königstein/Ts.: P. Hanstein. ISBN 9783775610742. OCLC 14091441.
- ——— (1994). Merklein, Helmut (ed.). Vierzig Jahre Jesusforschung (1950–1990). Bonner biblische Beiträge. Vol. 91. Weinheim: Beltz Athenäum. ISBN 9783895470110. OCLC 231625036.

=== Chapters ===
- ——— (1985). "L'exégèse scientifique au XXe siècle: Le Nouveau Testament". In Savart, C.; Aletti, J. N. (eds.). Le Monde Contemorain et la Bible. BTT. Vol. 8. Paris: Beauchesne. pp. 473–515. ISBN 9782701029115.
