= Morna Hooker =

British theologian

Morna Dorothy Hooker (born 19 May 1931) is a British theologian and New Testament scholar.

== Early life and education ==
Morna Hooker was born in Beddington on 19 May 1931. She went to the University of Bristol where she graduated with first-class honours in theology, and then earned her MA degree. Her PhD degree was awarded by the University of Manchester, though completed at the University of Durham under C. K. Barrett owing to the unexpected death of her Manchester supervisor.

== Career and research ==
She became a research fellow in Arts at Durham. In 1961, she was elected to a temporary, then permanent, lectureship at King's College London. In 1970, she left for a lectureship in Theology at University of Oxford, with a fellowship at Linacre College, Oxford.

She was Lady Margaret's Professor of Divinity at the University of Cambridge from 1976 to 1998, becoming the first woman to hold the Cambridge degree of DD, and as of 1998 is Professor Emerita. She holds honorary doctorates from the University of Bristol (1994) and the University of Edinburgh (1997).

She remains a Fellow of Robinson College, having joined the fellowship as a founding Fellow in 1977, and is also a Fellow of King's College London (1979) and an honorary Fellow of Linacre College, Oxford.

Hooker was the first woman to be elected President of the Studiorum Novi Testamenti Societas, an international society of New Testament scholars (1988). She was the first woman to become a joint editor of The Journal of Theological Studies.

She has been an active Methodist local preacher. She has also been Chair of the Wesley House Trustees.

Her scholarly interests lie in early Christian thought in the setting of Jewish biblical inheritance. Her research focuses in particular on the Epistles of Paul and the Gospel according to Mark, as well as on Christology. Her theological standpoint on soteriology is Arminian.

== Personal life ==
She is the widow of fellow theologian and Methodist minister the Rev. David Stacey, and is sometimes styled Morna Hooker-Stacey.

== Awards ==
In 2004, she was awarded the Burkitt Medal for Biblical Studies by the British Academy.

== Publications ==
=== Books ===
- Jesus and the Servant: The Influence of the Servant Concept of Deutero-Isaiah in the New Testament (1959)
- The Son of Man in Mark (1967)
- What about the New Testament? (jt. ed. 1975)
- Interchange and atonement (1978)
- Studying the New Testament (1979)
- Pauline Pieces/A Preface to Paul (1980)
- Paul and Paulinism (jt. ed. 1982)
- Trial and tribulation in Mark XIII (1983)
- The Message of Mark (1983)
- Continuity and Discontinuity: Early Christianity in Its Jewish Setting (1986)
- From Adam to Christ: Essays on St Paul (1990)
- The Gospel according to St Mark (1993)
- Not Ashamed of the Gospel: New Testament Interpretations of the Death of Christ (1994)
- The Signs of a Prophet: The prophetic actions of Jesus (1997)
- Beginnings: Keys that open the Gospels (1997)
- Endings: Invitations to discipleship (2003)
- Paul: A short introduction (2003)
- Not in Word Alone (ed. 2003)
- Paul: A beginner's Guide (2008)

=== Articles ===
- Hooker, Morna (2009). "Authority on her Head: An Examination of I Cor. xi. 10". New Testament Studies. 10 (3).

== Notes and references ==
=== Sources ===
- BA (4 October 2004). "Winners of 2004 British Academy medals and prizes". British Academy. Archived from the original on 15 March 2012.
- Halcomb, T. Michael W. (2012). Entering the Fray: A Primer on New Testament Issues for the Church and Academy. Wipf and Stock Publishers.
- LC (2020). "Fellows". Linacre College.
- Moule, C. F. D. (1996). "Introductory Essay". Early Christian Thought in its Jewish Context. Cambridge University Press. ISBN 9780521462853.
- Niemelä, John H. (2012). "That I May Attain To Whose Resurrection? Philippians 3:11" (PDF). Journal of the Grace Evangelical Society. 25 (49).
- Sleeman, Elizabeth (2002). The International Who's Who of Women 2002. Taylor & Francis.
- WH (2020). "About Wesley House". Wesley House.
- Williams, Lynne (15 August 1997). "Honorary degrees". The Times.
