= Ernst Hermann Riesenfeld =

German-Swedish chemist (1877–1957)

- Born: 25 October 1877; Brieg, German Empire
- Died: 19 May 1957 (aged 79); Stockholm, Kingdom of Sweden
- Citizenship: German, Swedish
- Education: University of Heidelberg; University of Göttingen
- Known for: ITIES, Nernst balance, work on ozone
- Spouse: Johanna (Hanna) Johansson (1878–1964)
- Children: Ernst Harald Riesenfeld (1913–2008); Hans Erik Riesenfeld (1914–2001); Anna Karin Riesenfeld (1920–1992)
- Scientific career
- Fields: Electrochemistry, Physical chemistry, Analytical chemistry
- Workplaces: University of Göttingen (1901–1913); University of Freiburg (1913–1920); University of Berlin (1920–1934); Nobel Institute of Physical Chemistry (1934–1952)
- Thesis: Ueber elektrolytische Erscheinungen und elektromotorische Kräfte an der Grenzfläche zweier Lösungsmittel (1901)
- Doctoral advisor: Walther Nernst
- Doctoral students: Georg-Maria Schwab

Ernst Hermann Riesenfeld (25 October 1877 – 19 May 1957) was a German/Swedish chemist. Riesenfeld started his academic career with important contributions in electrochemistry by the side of his mentor Walther Nernst, and continued as a professor with work on the improvement of analytical techniques and the purification of ozone. Dismissed and prosecuted in Nazi Germany due to his Jewish origins, he emigrated to Sweden in 1934 and continued his ozone-related work there until retirement.

== Biography ==
Riesenfeld was born in Brieg (which was then in Prussia, but is now Brzeg in Poland), the son of physician (Sanitätsrat) Dr. Emanuel Riesenfeld, and attended the local school. Following the family’s move to Breslau (now Wrocław, Poland) he attended the humanistic König-Wilhelms Gymnasium, which he left in 1897 (Max Born attended the same Gymnasium until 1901).

He studied general natural sciences at the Universities of Heidelberg and Göttingen, beginning in 1899. At the latter university he mainly dealt with physical chemistry and electrochemistry, on which he submitted his PhD thesis “Ueber elektrolytische Erscheinungen und elektromotorische Kräfte an der Grenzfläche zweier Lösungsmittel” under the supervision of Walther Nernst. This pioneering work is remembered as the starting point of what is now known as electrochemistry at the interface between two immiscible electrolyte solutions (ITIES), an independent research field in modern times. The determination of the free energies of ion transfer between aqueous and organic solutions, which Riesenfeld investigated, is of great importance for applications in biology, physiology, pharmacy, or in the chemical laboratory technique of liquid-liquid extraction. Riesenfeld, together with Nernst, also developed a highly sensitive torsion displacement balance which is known as ‘Nernst balance’.

After some years as a researcher under Nernst, in 1913 Riesenfeld was appointed as a professor at the University of Freiburg (Freiburg im Breisgau, Germany). In 1920 he became a professor at the University of Berlin, where he headed a laboratory tasked with the isolation and determination of properties of pure ozone, a task hitherto elusive due to the high explosion and toxicity risks in handling the concentrated chemical. Among others he supervised Georg-Maria Schwab, who was the first to prepare solid ozone.

Because of his Jewish origin, Riesenfeld lost his position in 1934 and moved to Sweden, where he worked until 1952 at the Nobel Institute of Physical Chemistry. During his time at the Nobel Institute, Riesenfeld worked on the thermal formation of ozone at high temperatures.

Riesenfeld was also the author of a well-known textbook and a laboratory manual on inorganic chemistry; his books were published in many editions and translations.

He died in Stockholm on 19 May 1957.

=== Family ===
In 1911 Riesenfeld married Johanna (Hanna) Johansson (1878–1964), a sister of Maria Johansson (1871–1957), the second wife of the chemist Svante Arrhenius. They had three children: Ernst Harald Riesenfeld (1913–2008), who became Professor of Theology (New Testament) at the University of Uppsala, Hans Erik Riesenfeld (1914–2001), a paediatrician, and Anna Karin Riesenfeld (1920–1992), a high school teacher of languages.

== Bibliography ==
- Ernst H. Riesenfeld (1901) "On electrolytic phenomena and electromotive forces at the interface between two solvents" (Ger., Ueber elektrolytische Erscheinungen und elektromotorische Kräfte an der Grenzfläche zweier Lösungsmittel). Dieterich’sche Universitäts-Buchdruckerei, Göttingen
- E. H. Riesenfeld (1901) "Über elektrolytische Erscheinungen und elektromotorische Kräfte an der Grenzfläche zweier Lösungsmittel". Zeitschrift für Elektrochemie 7:645-648

Walther Nernst, Ernst H. Riesenfeld (1901) "Über elektrolytische Erscheinungen an der Grenzfläche zweier Lösungsmittel". Nachrichten der Königlichen Gesellschaft der Wissenschaften zu Göttingen, No. 1, 54-61

- Ernst H. Riesenfeld (1902) "Über den Molekularzustand von Jodkalium in Phenol". Zeitschrift für physikalische Chemie 41:346-352
- Walther Nernst, Ernst H. Riesenfield (1902) "Ueber elektrolytische Erscheinungen an der Grenzfläche zweier Lösungsmittel". Annalen der Physik 313:600-608
- Ernst H. Riesenfeld (1902) "Bestimmung der Ueberführungszahl einiger Salze in Phenol". Annalen der Physik 313: 609-615
- Ernst H. Riesenfeld (1902) "Concentrationsketten mit nichtmischbaren Lösungsmitteln". Annalen der Physik 313: 616-624
- Walther Nernst, Ernst H. Riesenfeld (1903) "Ueber quantitative Gewichtsanalyse mit sehr kleinen Substanzmengen". Chemische Berichte 36:2086-2093
- Ernst H. Riesenfeld (1931) "Svante Arrhenius". Akademische Verlagsgesellschaft, Leipzig
- Ernst H. Riesenfeld (1924) "Walter Nernst zu seinem sechzigsten Geburtstag". Angewandte Chemie 37:437-439
- Ernst H. Riesenfeld (1934) "Lehrbuch der Anorganischen Chemie". S. Hirzel Verlag, Leipzig; 2nd edition F. Deuticke Verlag, Wien 1939; 3rd edition Rascher Verlag, Zürich 1943, 4th edition S. Hirzel Verlag Leipzig 1946, 5th edition Rascher Verlag, Zürich 1950; Spanish edition (1942, 1950): Tratado de química inorgánica. Manuel Marín, Editor, Barcelona.
- Ernst H. Riesenfeld (1910) "Anorganisch-chemisches Praktikum". Qualitative Analyse und anorganische Präparate (17th edition Rascher Verlag, Zürich 1956); Spanish editions (1928, 1943, 1950): Prácticas de química inorgánica. Análisis cualitativo y preparaciones inorgánicas. Editorial Labor, Barcelona; French editions (1940): Manuel Pratique De Chimie Minerale (Analyse Qualitative et Preparations). Dunod, Paris
- Ernst H. Riesenfeld, M. Beja (1923) "Über die thermische Bildung von Ozon". Meddelanden från Kungliga Vetenskapsakademiens Nobelinstitut, 6, 1-20
- Ernst H. Riesenfeld and M. Beja (1924) "Über die thermische Bildung von Ozon". Zeitschrift für Anorganische und Allgemeine Chemie, 133, 245-262
- Ernst H. Riesenfeld (1939) "Die thermische Dissoziation des Sauerstoffes". Zeitschrift für Anorganische und Allgemeine Chemie, 242, 47-48
- Ernst H. Riesenfeld (1925) "Über die Ozonbildung in Glühenden Capillaren". Zeitschrift für Elektrochemie, 31, 435-440
- Ernst H. Riesenfeld (1924) "Über die Bildung von Ozon und Wasserstoffsuperoxyd in der Knallgasflamme". Zeitschrift für Physikalische Chemie, 110, 801-807
- Ernst H. Riesenfeld (1929) "Die Bildung und Zersetzung von Ozon". Zeitschrift für Angewandte Chemie, 42, 729-734
