= Theodore Henry Robinson =

British biblical scholar (1881–1964)

Theodore Henry Robinson (1881–1964) was a British biblical scholar who became professor of Semitic languages at University College, Cardiff.

== Life ==
Robinson was born in Edenbridge, Kent, on 9 August 1881 to the Baptist minister W. Venis Robinson and his wife Emily Jane. After studying at St. John's College, Cambridge, Regent's Park Baptist College (then still in London) and Göttingen University, he taught Hebrew and Syriac at Serampore College, Bengal.

In 1915 he was appointed lecturer in Semitic languages in Cardiff, and in 1927 professor. He served as the secretary of the Society for Old Testament Study from 1917 to 1946, and was twice president (1928, 1946).

In retirement he lived in Ealing, where he died on 26 June 1964.

== Publications ==
- Prophecy and the Prophets in the Old Testament (1923)
- The Decline and Fall of the Hebrew Kingdoms (1926)
- with W. O. E. Oesterley, Hebrew Religion (1930)
- with W. O. E. Oesterley, A History of Israel (1932)

Robinson contributed several articles to the 14th edition of the Encyclopaedia Britannica (1929–1930).

== Awards ==
- Honorary doctorates:
  - University of Aberdeen
  - University of Halle-Wittenberg
  - University of Wales
- British Academy Burkitt Medal
