= Moule =

Moule or moules may refer to:

== People ==
- Aaron Moule (born 1977), rugby player
- Alf Moule (1894–1973), English cricketer
- Arthur Christopher Moule (1873–1957), British sinologist
- Brad Moules, rugby player
- Bronte Moules, Australian diplomat
- C. F. D. Moule (1908–2007), Anglican priest and theologian
- Harry Moule (1921–2016), English cricketer
- Henry Moule (1801–1880), Anglican priest, inventor of the dry earth closet, and father of sons:
  - Henry Joseph Moule (1825–1904), watercolour artist
  - George Evans Moule (1828–1912), Anglican missionary in China
  - Horatio Mosley Moule (1832–1873), friend of Thomas Hardy
  - Charles Walter Moule (1834–1921), university lecturer and librarian
  - Arthur Evans Moule (1836–1918), English missionary to China
  - Handley Carr Glyn Moule (1841–1920), Bishop of Durham
- Jack Moule (born 1994), jet skier
- John Moule (politician) (1845–1912), wheat merchant and politician in South Australia
- Ken Moule (1925–1986), English jazz pianist
- Thomas Moule (1784–1851), English antiquarian, writer on heraldry and map-maker
- William Moule (1858–1939), Australian lawyer and politician

== Other ==
- Moules-frites, a dish of mussels and French fries
- Moulé, a village in the Diébougou Department of Bougouriba Province in Burkina Faso
- Le Moule, a commune in the French overseas département of Guadeloupe
- Moulès, a village in the commune of Arles, Bouches-du-Rhône department, France
