= List of churches in Dorset =

The following is a list of churches in Dorset, England.

== List ==
- List of churches in Bournemouth
- List of churches in Christchurch
- List of churches in Dorchester
- List of churches in East Dorset
- List of churches in North Dorset
- List of churches in Poole
- List of churches in Purbeck
- List of churches in West Dorset
- List of churches in Weymouth and Portland
