= List of churches in Dorchester =

The following is a list of churches in Dorchester, Dorset.

== List ==
- All Saints Church, Dorchester
- Christ Church, Dorchester
- Holy Trinity Church, Dorchester
- St George's Church, Fordington
- St Mary's Church, Dorchester
- St Peter's Church, Dorchester
