= Charles Moule =

Charles Moule may refer to:

- C. F. D. Moule (Charles Francis Digby Moule, 1908–2007), Anglican priest and theologian
- Charles Walter Moule (1834–1921), English academic, librarian and president of Corpus Christi College, Cambridge
