= Neckwear =

Fashion accessories worn on or around the neck

Neckwear is a category of clothing that is worn around or on the neck. Neckwear can be utilitarian in nature, usually to protect the neck from colder temperatures, or can be worn as a "fashion statement." Neckwear is distinguishable from a necklace, which is defined as jewelry.

== Types of neckwear ==
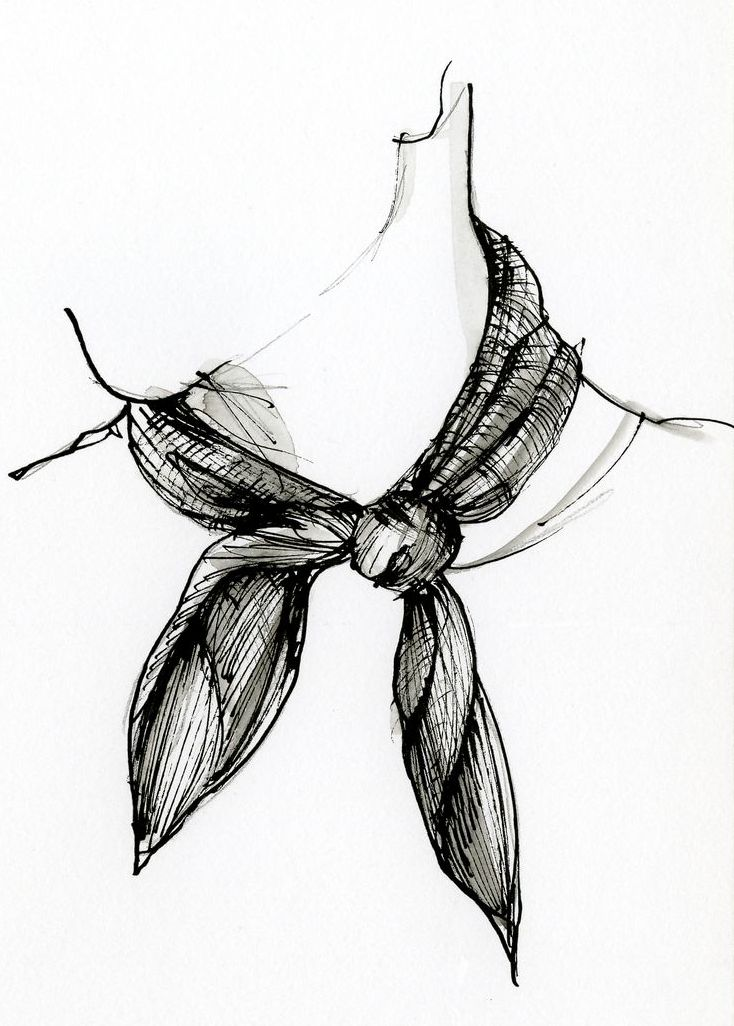
Neckerchief

=== Neckerchief ===
A neckerchief (from neck (n.) + kerchief), sometimes called a necker, kerchief or scarf, is a type of neckwear associated with those working or living outdoors, including farm labourers, cowboys and sailors. It is most commonly still seen today in the Scouts, Girl Guides and other similar youth movements. A neckerchief consists of a triangular piece of cloth or a rectangular piece folded into a triangle. The long edge is rolled towards the point, leaving a portion unrolled. The neckerchief is then fastened around the neck with the ends either tied or clasped with a slide or woggle.

=== Scarf ===
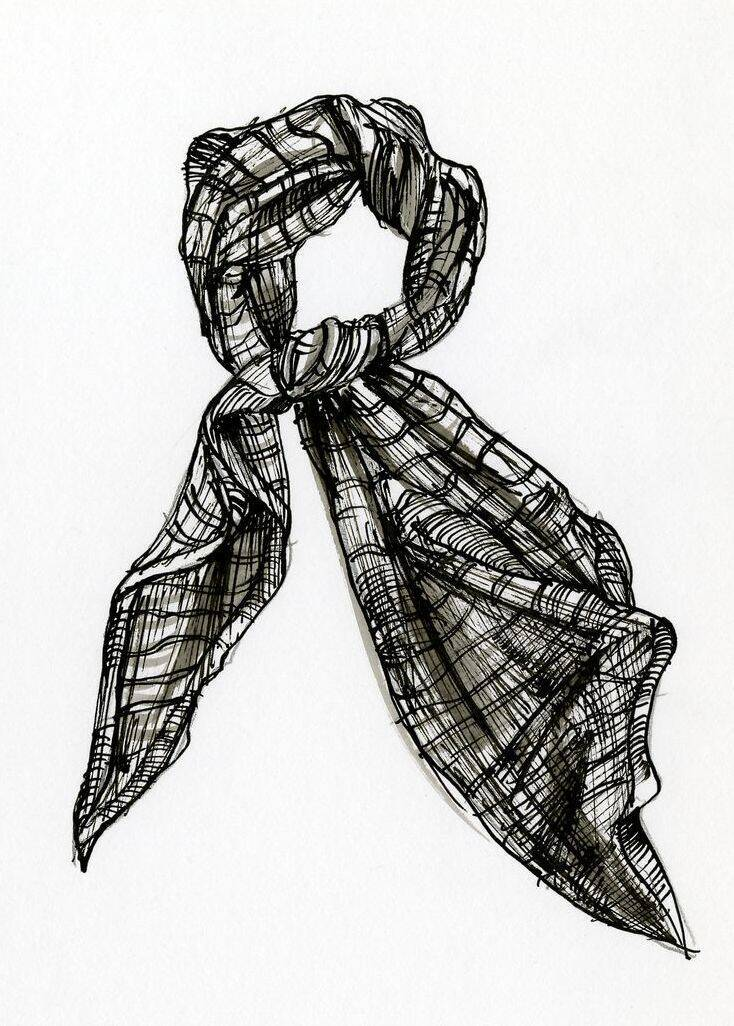
Scarf

A scarf (pl.: scarves or scarfs) is a long piece of fabric that is worn on or around the neck, shoulders, or head. A scarf is used for warmth, sun protection, cleanliness, fashion, religious reasons, or to show support for a sports club or team. Scarves can be made from materials including wool, linen, silk, and cotton. It is a common type of neckwear and a perennial accessory.

=== Ruff or millstone collar ===
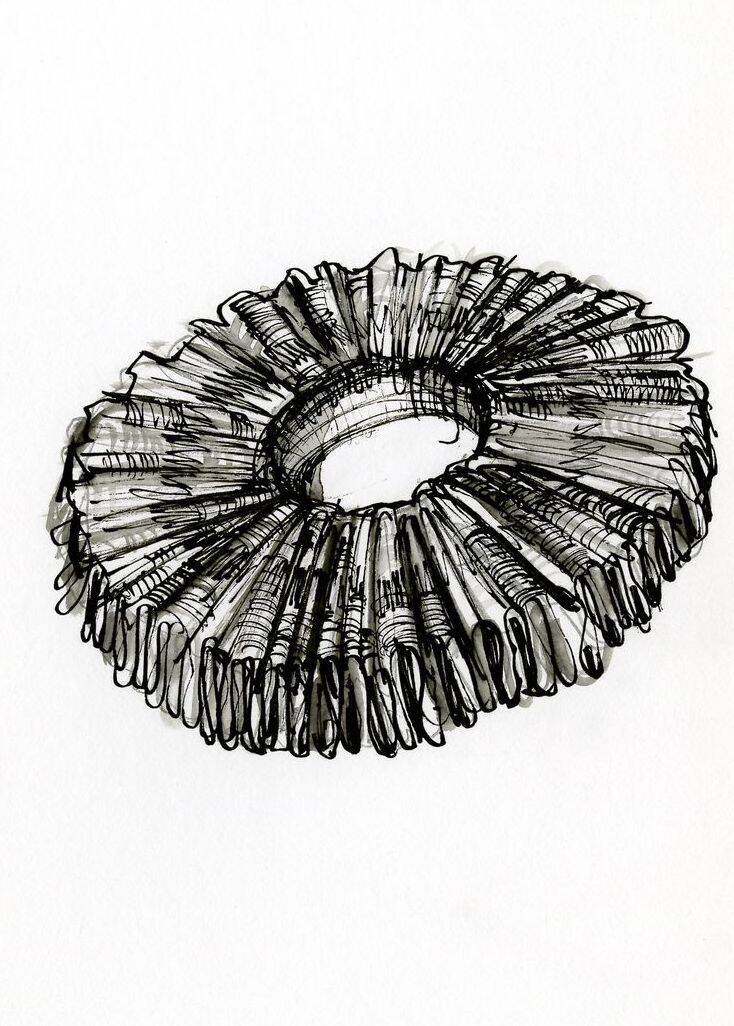
Ruff collar

A ruff is an item of clothing worn in Western, Central and Northern Europe, as well as Spanish America, from the mid-16th century to the mid-17th century. The round and flat variation is often called a millstone collar after its resemblance to millstones for grinding grain.

=== Stock ===
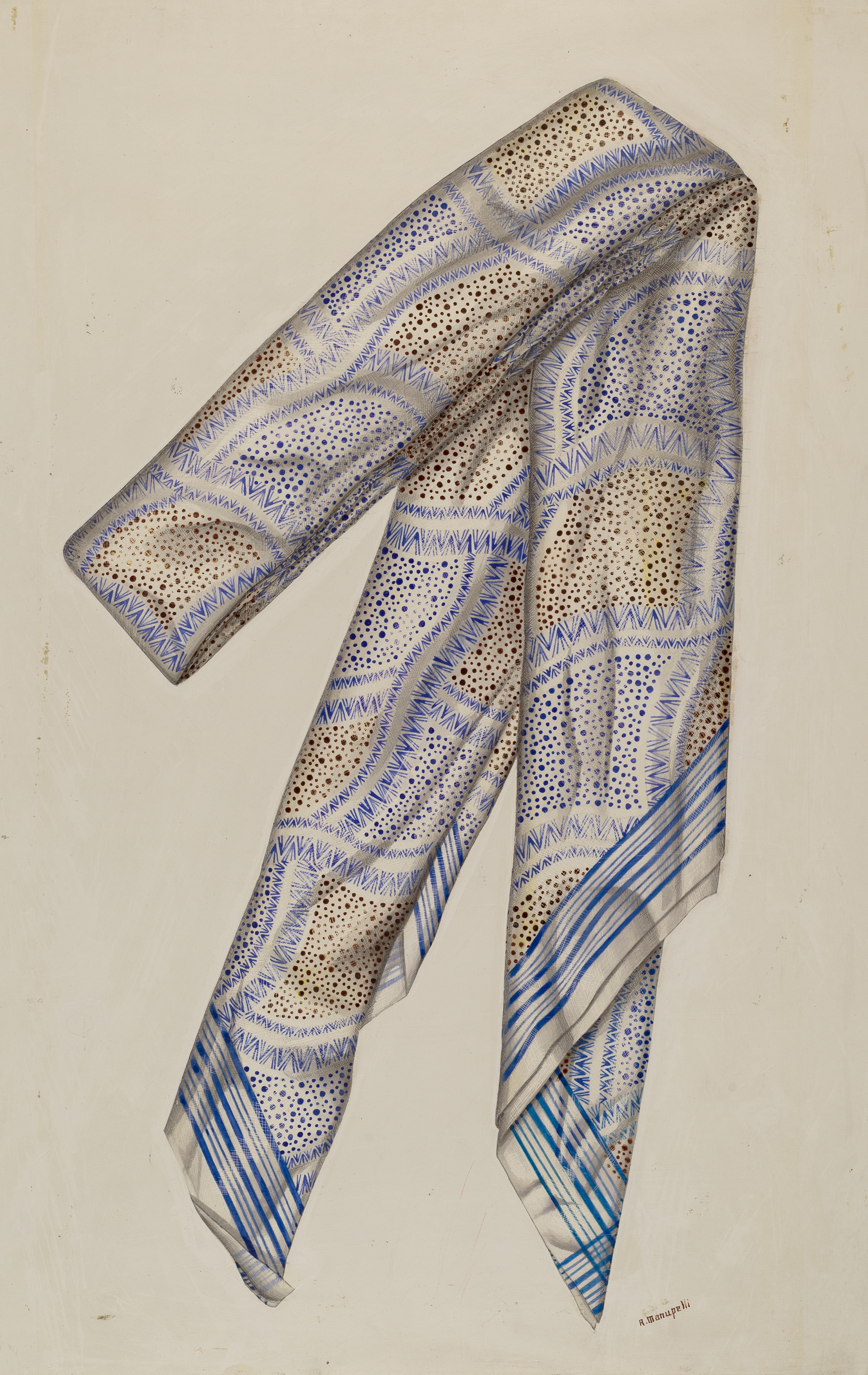
Stock tie

A stock tie, or stock, is a style of neckwear. Originally a form of neck-cloth that was often stiffened and usually close-fitting, formerly worn by men generally, but post-nineteenth century only in use in military uniforms. Another type of stock is worn by certain clergy and consists of black silk or other fabric, that falls over the chest and is secured by a band around the neck. Equestrians wear a stock tie around the neck when dressed formally for a hunt or certain competitive events. Most equestrian competition rules require it to be white. It is mandated attire for use in dressage and the dressage phase of eventing. Use of the stock tie also is seen in show jumping and fox hunting. The stock tie continues to be in fashion for equestrians.

=== Tippet ===
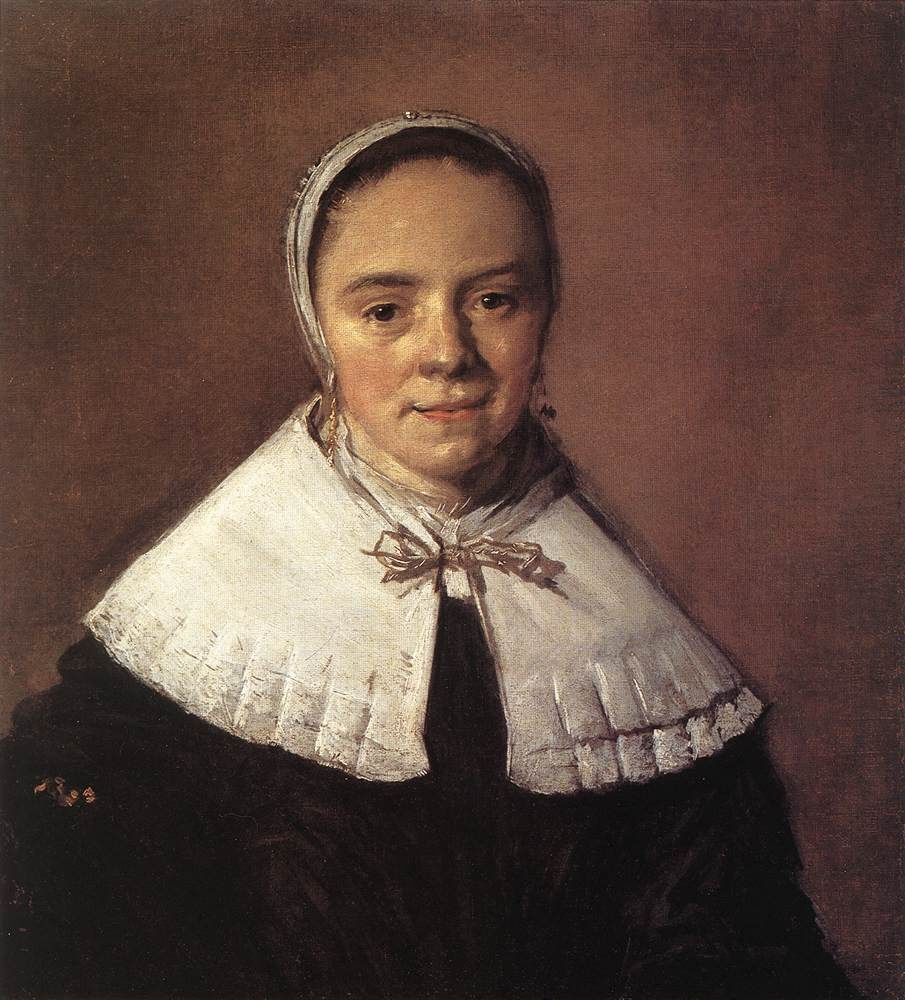
Portrait of a Woman by Frans Hals, about 1655–1660. The sitter wears a white tippet. Ferens Art Gallery, Hull, England

A tippet is a piece of clothing worn over the shoulders in the shape of a scarf or cape. Tippets evolved in the fourteenth century from long sleeves and typically had one end hanging down to the knees. A tippet (or tappit) could also be the long, narrow, streamer-like strips of fabric - attached with an armband just above the elbow - that hung gracefully to the knee or even to the ground. In later fashion, a tippet is often any scarf-like wrap, usually made of fur, such as the sixteenth-century zibellino or the fur-lined capelets worn in the mid-18th century.

=== Cravat ===
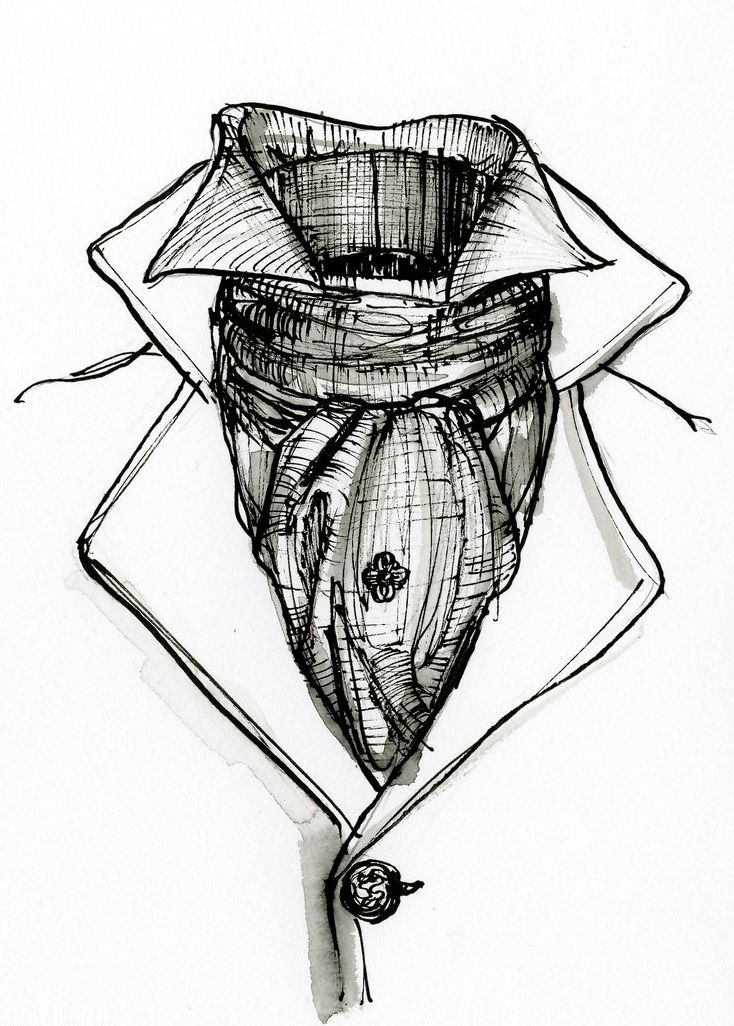
Cravat as worn in the 19th century

In 1660, in celebration of its hard-fought victory over the Ottoman Empire, a regiment from Croatia visited Paris. There, the soldiers were presented as glorious heroes to Louis XIV, a monarch well known for his eye for personal adornment. It so happened that the officers of this regiment were wearing brightly colored handkerchiefs fashioned of silk around their necks. These neckcloths struck the fancy of the king, and he soon made them an insignia of royalty as he created a regiment of Royal Cravattes. The word cravat is derived from the à la croate—'in the style of the Croats'.

In the 18th century, during the period that is commonly referred to as the Regency era, cravats and collars were typically fashioned from white cotton or linen. Early in the century, collars were gathered onto a neckband and were usually hidden beneath a neck cloth or cravat, which was wrapped around the neck and tied below the chin. As the century progressed, these neckbands grew longer and gradually developed into collars that were sewn directly onto shirts. One variation, known as the steinkirk, featured a loosely twisted cravat with one end pulled through a buttonhole.

Starting around 1730, cravats began to fall out of fashion and were largely replaced by stocks. These were squares of linen folded into tall neckbands, stiffened with buckram for structure, and secured at the back of the neck. It was also common to wear a black ribbon tied in a bow at the front as a decorative element.

=== Ascot tie ===
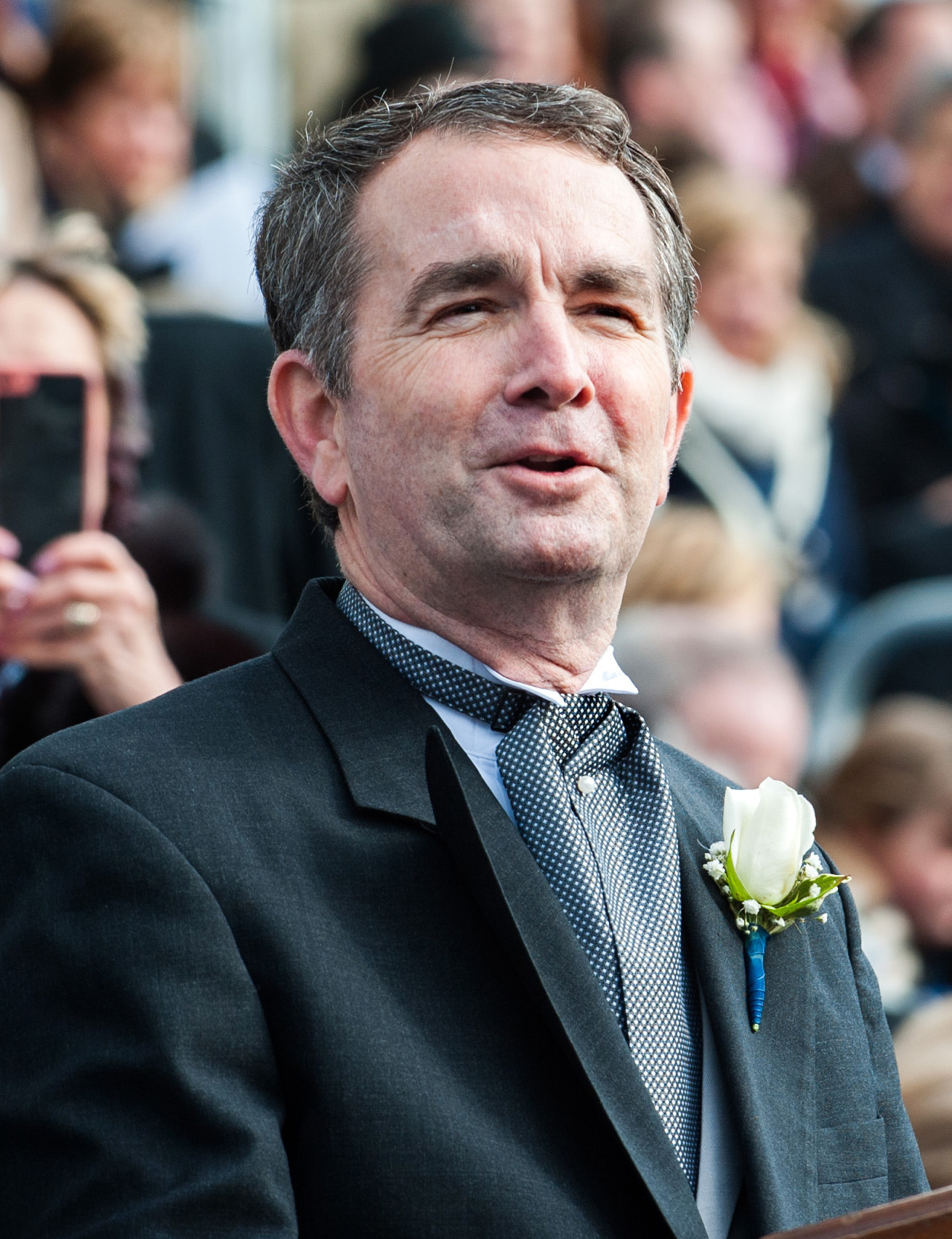
Ralph Northam, then the governor of the U.S. state of Virginia, speaking while wearing an ascot tie in 2018

An ascot tie or ascot is an article of neckwear with wide pointed wings at the end, wrapped around the neck and draped down the chest to cover the front placket and button line of a dress shirt. Formal ascots are always worn above a winged shirt collar and tied at the front, while informal cravats are worn underneath the shirt collar, and are untied. Ascots are traditionally made of patterned silk. While earlier cravats were only found in certain colors due to the difficulty of obtaining and manufacturing pigments and dyes, today's ascot can be found in nearly any color, but is usually seen in neutral tones to match with the dress shirt and suit jacket or tuxedo it might be paired with. This wider relative of the necktie is usually patterned, folded over, and fastened with a tie pin or tie clip. It is usually reserved for formal wear with morning dress for daytime weddings and worn with a cutaway morning coat and striped grey formal trousers.

=== Bands or tabs ===
Two pairs of starched bands, as made by Shepherd & Woodward and Ede & Ravenscroft

Bands are a form of formal neckwear, worn by some clergy and lawyers, and with some forms of academic dress. They take the form of two oblong pieces of cloth, usually though not invariably white, which are tied to the neck. When worn by clergy, they typically are attached to a clerical collar. The word bands is usually plural because they require two similar parts and did not come as one piece of cloth. Those worn by clergy are often called preaching bands or Geneva bands; those worn by lawyers are called barrister's bands or, more usually in Ireland and Canada, tabs.

=== Bow tie ===
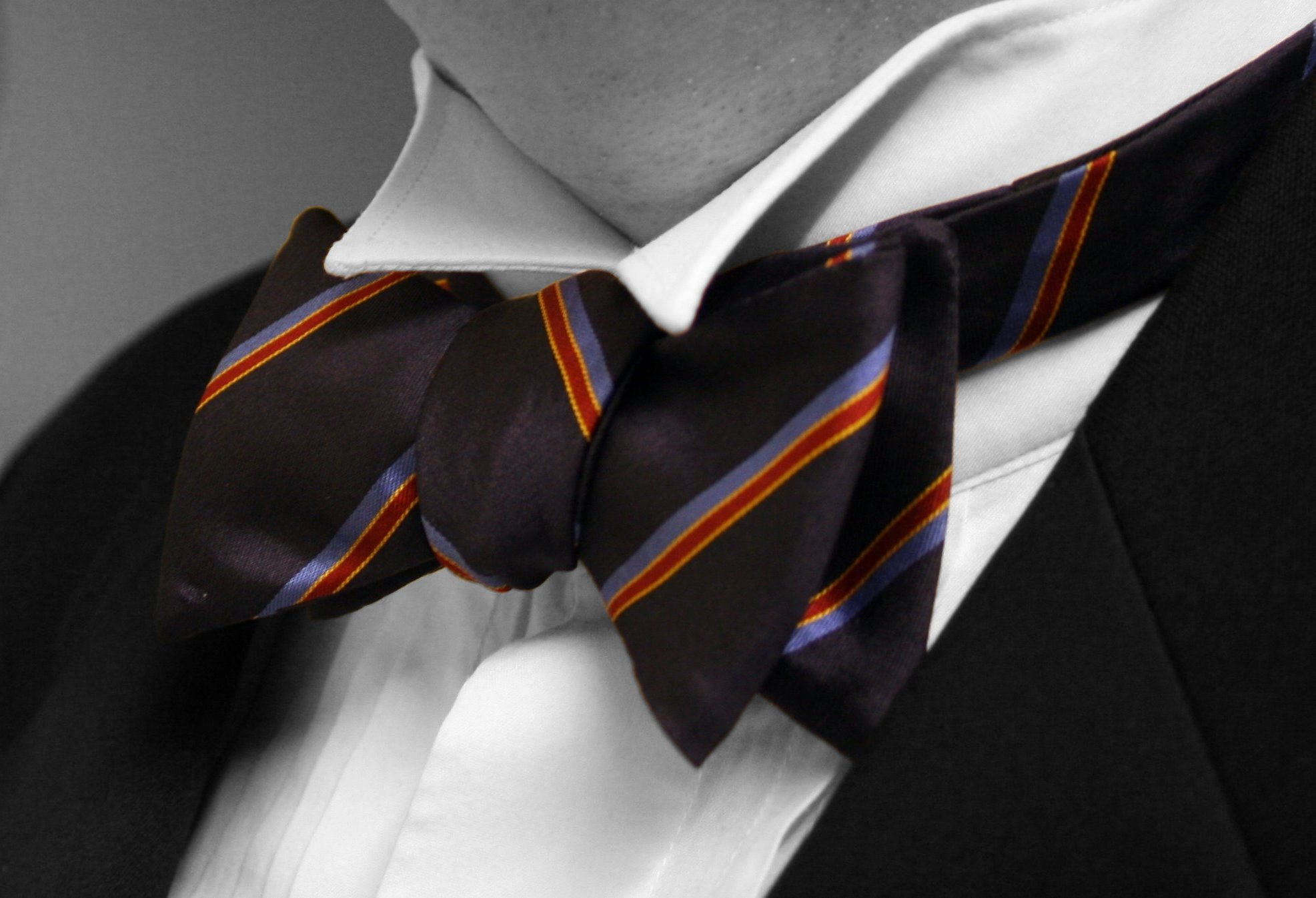
A striped bow tie underneath a winged collar

The bow tie or dicky bow /boʊ/ is a type of neckwear, not to be confused with a necktie. A modern bow tie is tied using a common shoelace knot, which is also called the bow knot for that reason. It consists of a ribbon of fabric tied around the collar of a shirt in a symmetrical manner so that the two opposite ends form loops. There are generally three types of bow ties: the pre-tied, the clip-on, and the self-tie. Pre-tied bow ties are ties in which the distinctive bow is sewn onto a band that goes around the neck and clips to secure. Some "clip-ons" dispense with the band altogether, instead clipping straight to the collar. The traditional bow tie, consisting of a strip of cloth that the wearer has to tie by hand, is also known as a "self-tie", "tie-it-yourself", or "freestyle" bow tie.

=== Clerical collar ===
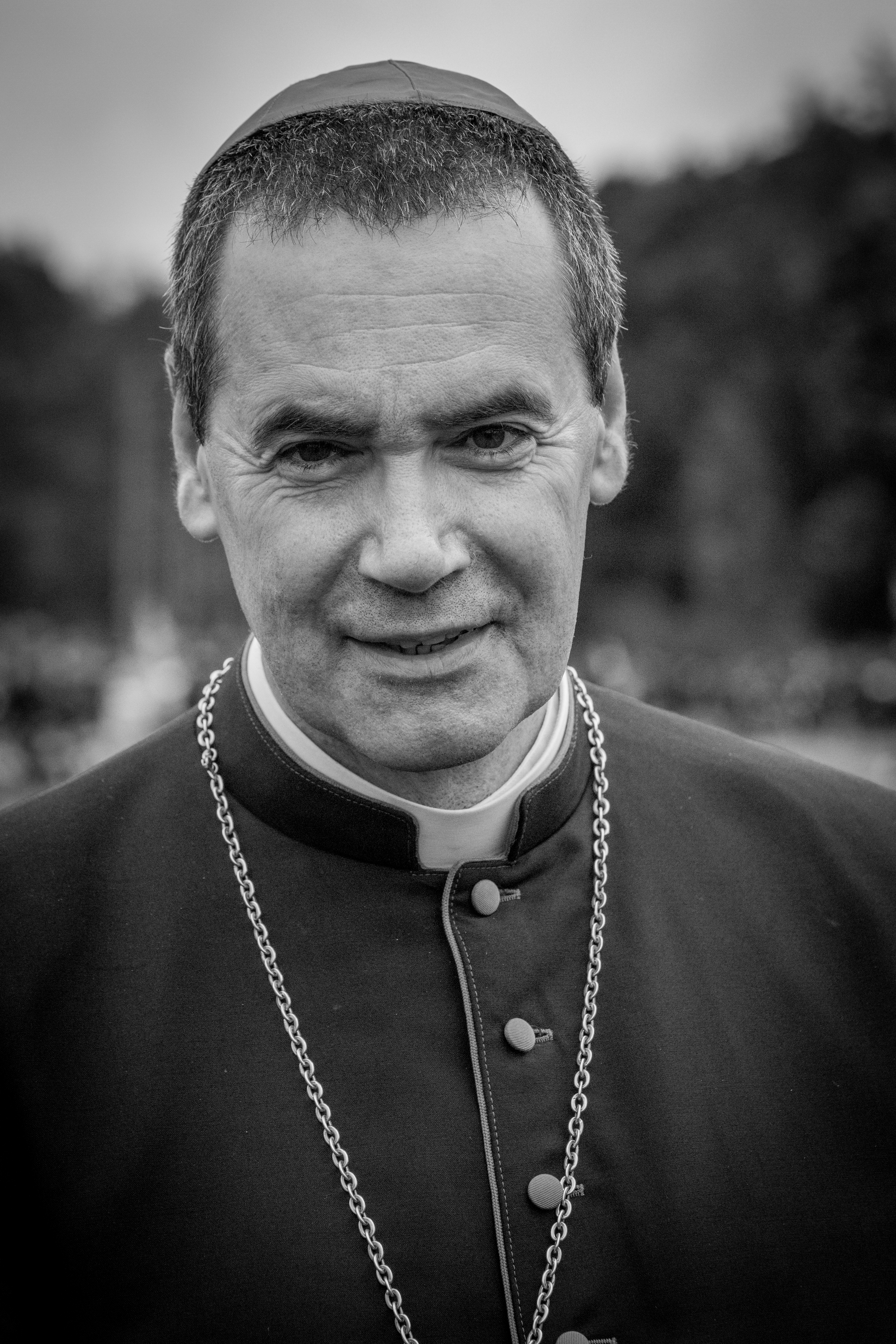
Bishop Jacques Habert wearing a Clerical collar

A clerical collar, Roman collar, clergy collar, or, informally, dog collar, is an item of Christian clerical clothing. The clerical collar is almost always white and was originally made of cotton or linen but is now frequently made of plastic. There are various styles of clerical collar. The traditional full collar (the style informally described as a dog collar) is a ring that closes at the back of the neck, presenting a seamless front. It is often attached with a collaret or collarinothat covers the white collar almost completely, except for a small white rectangle at the base of the throat, and sometimes with the top edge of the collar exposed to mimic the collar of a cassock. Alternatively, it may simply be a detachable tab of white in the front of the clerical shirt. The clerical shirt is traditionally black (or another color appropriate to a person's ministry rank, such as purple for Anglican bishops), but today is available in a variety of colors depending on the wearer's preference. When clergy are delivering sermons, they sometimes attach preaching bands to their clerical collar.

=== Necktie ===
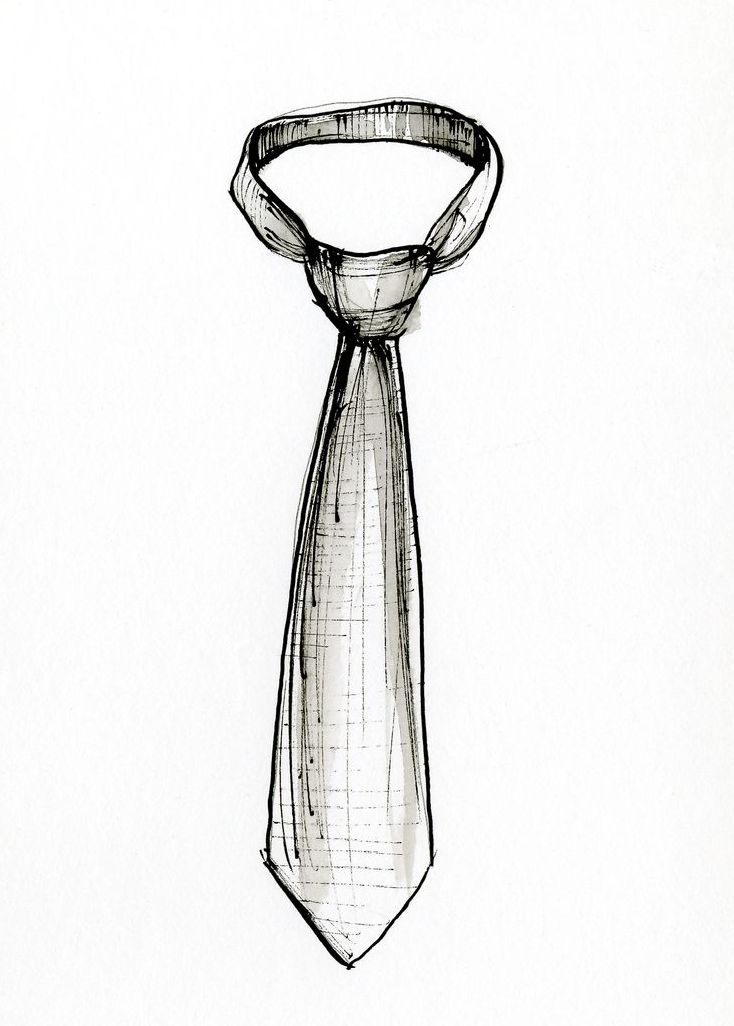
Necktie

A necktie, long tie, or simply a tie, is a cloth article of formal neckwear or office attire worn for decorative or symbolic purposes, resting under a folded shirt collar or knotted at the throat, and usually draped down the chest. On rare occasions neckties are worn above a winged shirt collar. However, in occupations where manual labor is involved, the end of the necktie is often tucked into the button line front placket of a dress shirt, such as the dress uniform of the United States Marine Corps. Neckties are usually paired with suit jackets or sport coats, but have often been seen with other articles, such as v-neck sweaters. Neckties are reported by fashion historians to be descended from the regency era cravat. Adult neckties are generally unsized in length but may be available in a longer sizes for taller persons. Widths are matched to the width of a suit jacket lapel. Neckties were originally considered "menswear," but are now considered unisex items in most Western cultures. Neckties can also be part of a uniform. Neckties are traditionally worn with the top shirt button fastened, and the tie knot resting between the collar points.

==== Bolo tie ====
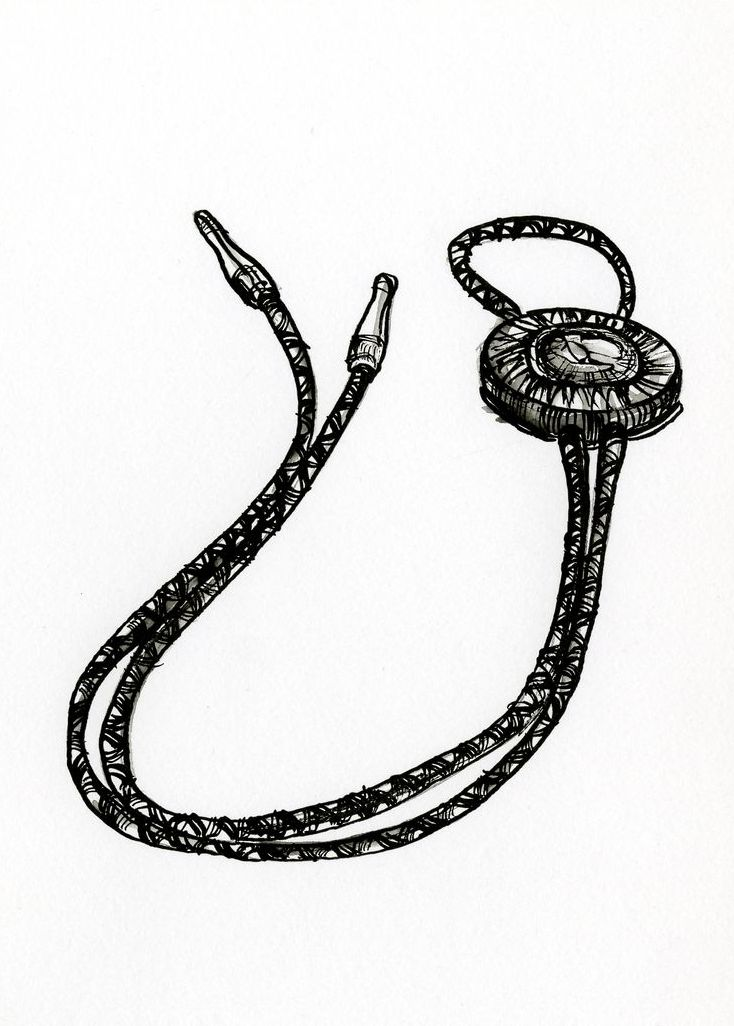
Bolo tie (drawing)

A bolo tie (sometimes bola tie or shoestring necktie) is a type of necktie consisting of a piece of cord or braided leather with decorative metal tips (called aiguillettes) and secured with an ornamental clasp or slide.

==== Kipper tie ====
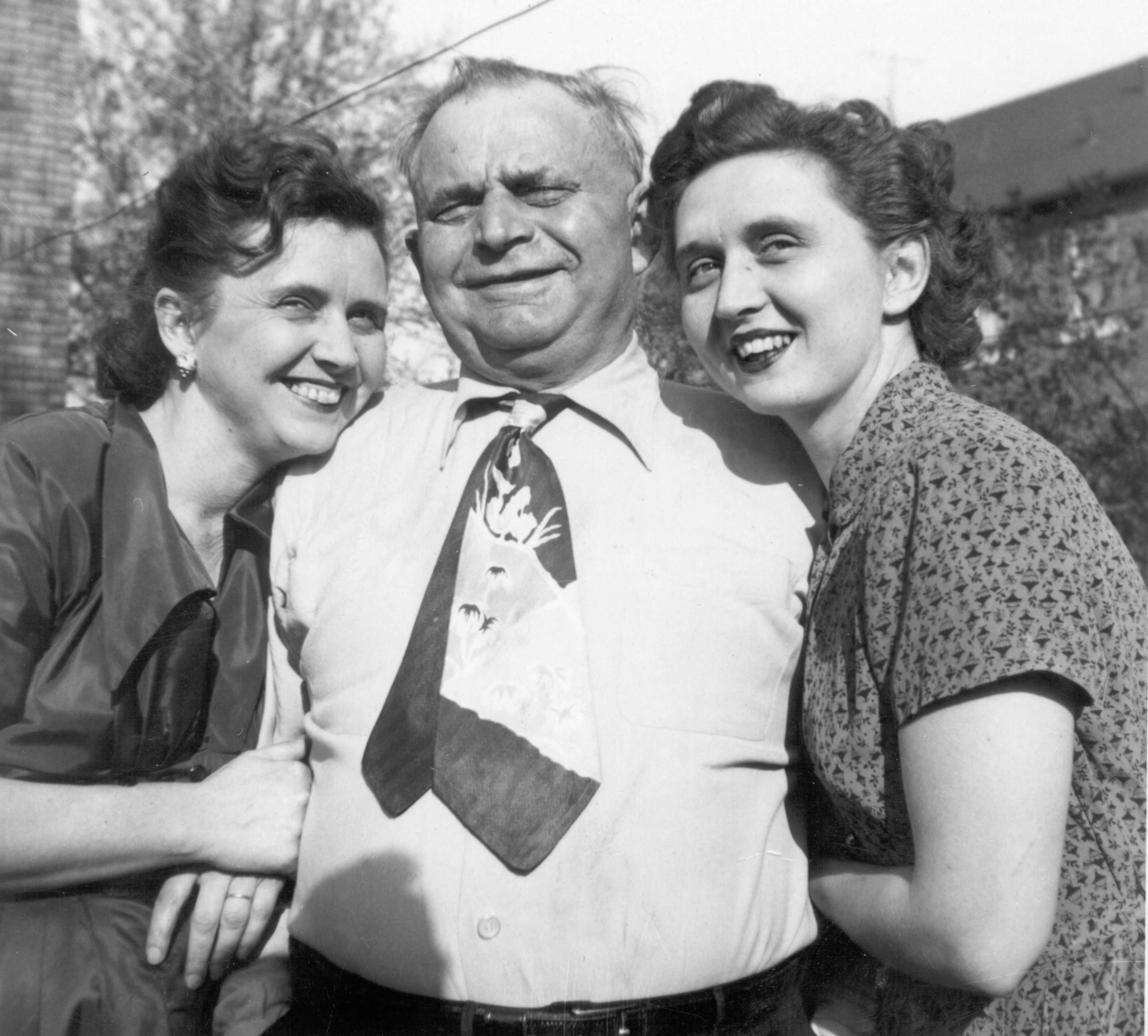
Man wearing a Kipper tie in 1953.

A kipper tie is a type of necktie primarily fashionable in Britain in the mid-1960s to late 1970s. The primary characteristics of the kipper tie are its extreme breadth (normally 4.5–5 inches (11–13 cm)) and often garish colours and patterns.

=== Pussy bow or lavallière ===
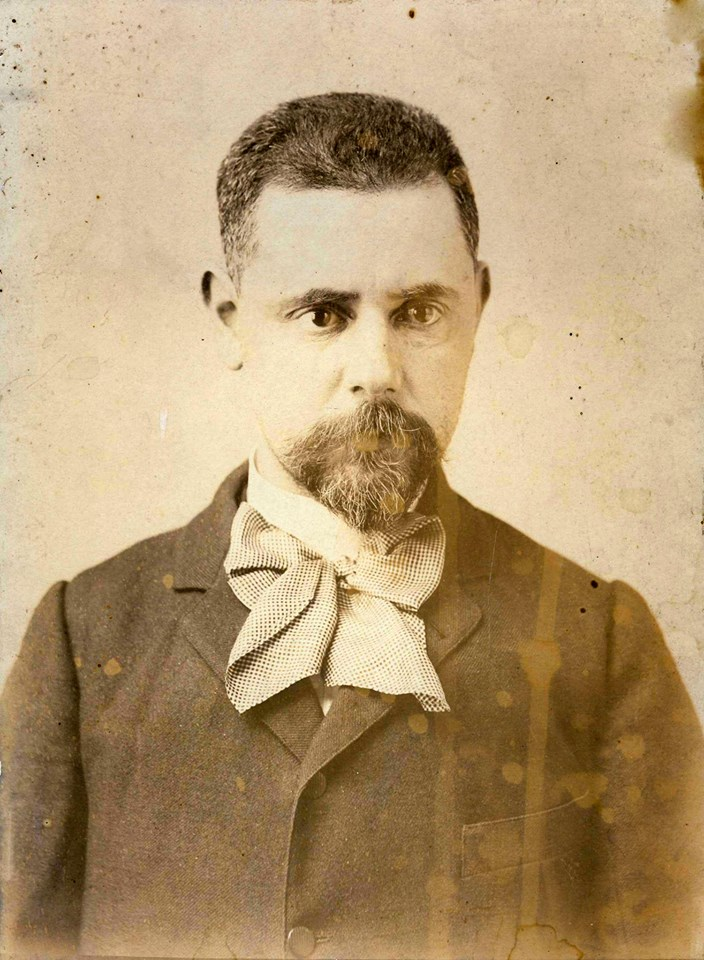
António José Lourinho seen here wearing a "Pussy bow."

A lavallière, also called a pussycat bow or pussybow, is a style of neckwear worn with women's and girls' blouses and bodices. It is a bow tied at the neck, which has been likened to those sometimes put on "pussy cats".

== See also ==
- Neckline
