= Wessex Poems and Other Verses =

1898 poem collection by Thomas Hardy

First edition cover

Wessex Poems and Other Verses (often referred to simply as Wessex Poems) is a collection of 51 poems set against the bleak and forbidding Dorset landscape by English writer Thomas Hardy. It was Hardy's first published collection of poetry and demarcated a shift in his output from prose to verse. It was first published in London and New York in 1898 by Harper & Brothers, and contained a number of illustrations by the author himself.

== Reception ==
The collection met a broadly hostile reception, critics being accustomed to Hardy as a (controversial) writer of prose alone. Hardy himself was taken aback by the failure to recognise his dry humour, as in the (slightly bawdy) 'Bride-Night Fire'.

On a more personal note, his wife Emma disliked the section consisting of love lyrics to various recipients; and especially 'The Ivy Wife', which she felt aimed at her.

== Notable poems ==
Two notable early poems from the collection (1860s) were "Hap" and 'Amabel' - the latter exploring the theme of sexual attraction impacted by age taken up by The Well-Beloved. 'She at His Funeral' was a tribute to Hardy's friend Horace Moule; while the bitter "Neutral Tones" and the cheerful 'Sergeant's Song' show further aspects of Hardy's range of poetic subjects.

== See also ==
- 1898 in poetry
- Thomas Hardy's Wessex
