= Handley Moule =

British theologian and writer (1841–1920)

The Right Reverend Handley Moule
- Bishop of Durham
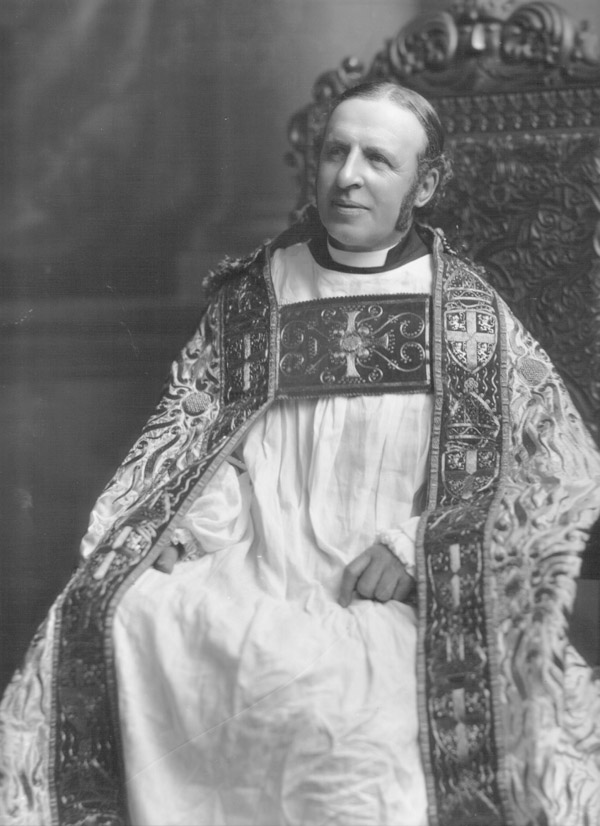
- Moule, 7 August 1902
- Diocese: Durham
- In office: 1901–1920
- Predecessor: Brooke Foss Westcott
- Successor: Hensley Henson
- Other posts: Dean of Trinity College chapel (1873–1877); Principal of Ridley Hall, Cambridge (1880–1899); Norrisian Professor of Divinity (1899–1901)

Orders
- Ordination: 1867 (deacon); 1868 (priest)
- Consecration: 18 October 1901, York Minster

Personal details
- Born: 23 December 1841 Fordington, Dorset, United Kingdom
- Died: 8 May 1920 (aged 78) Cambridge, Cambridgeshire, United Kingdom
- Buried: Bow cemetery, Durham
- Denomination: Anglican
- Parents: Henry Moule & Mary née Evans
- Spouse: Mary née Elliott (m. 1881; she died 1915)
- Children: Tesie; Isabel
- Education: Trinity College, Cambridge

Moule in 1914.

Handley Carr Glyn Moule (/moʊl/; 23 December 1841 – 8 May 1920) was an evangelical Anglican theologian, writer, poet, and Bishop of Durham from 1901 to 1920.

== Biography ==
Moule was schooled at home before entering Trinity College, Cambridge in 1860, where he graduated BA in 1864. He was elected a Fellow of Trinity in 1865, and became an assistant master at Marlborough College before he was ordained deacon in 1867 and priest in 1868. From 1867 he was his father's curate at Fordington, Dorset, with a stint of five years as Dean of Trinity College chapel, 1873–1877. In 1880 he became the first principal of Ridley Hall, Cambridge, and then in 1899 became Norrisian Professor of Divinity at the University of Cambridge, until his appointment as Bishop of Durham in September 1901. He was consecrated as a bishop in York Minster on 18 October 1901. As Bishop of Durham, Moule occupied Auckland Castle. The 1911 Census of England and Wales shows that he had in his household thirteen servants including a butler, two footmen, and a lady’s maid.

Moule was active in the Higher Life movement and was one of the speakers at the inaugural Keswick Convention.

Moule was an Honorary Chaplain to Queen Victoria from December 1898 until her death in January 1901, then an Honorary Chaplain to Edward VII for a couple of months until he was appointed bishop. In November 1901 he was elected an Honorary Fellow of St Catherine's College, Oxford, where he had been a Professorial Fellow previously, and in December 1901 he received the degree Doctor of Divinity (DD) by diploma from the University of Durham.

== Personal life ==
Handley Moule was the eighth and final son of Henry Moule (1801–1880), an inventor and the vicar of Fordington for over 50 years. Handley was named after his godfathers Augustus Handley, a minister at Fordington, and Carr John Glyn (father of General John P. C. Glyn). His brothers George Evans Moule and Arthur Evans Moule were missionaries in China, and another brother, Charles Walter Moule, was president of Corpus Christi. Two more brothers, Horatio Mosley Moule and artist Henry Joseph Moule are chiefly remembered as friends of novelist Thomas Hardy, who was well known to the Moule family. Moule's grand-nephew C. F. D. Moule was a notable theologian.

Handley Moule married Harriet Mary Elliott (1844–1914) (called "Mary") on 16 August 1881; they had two children, Mary "Tesie" Moule (1882–1905) and Isabel Catherine Moule (1884–1959). In 1907 Moule published a memoir on Mary's short life entitled The School of Suffering. Isabel married Robert Vere de Vere, a colonial judge.

Moule is buried in Bow Cemetery, on Elvet Garth in Durham.

== Views and influence ==
Moule had a considerable reputation as a preacher and persuasive speaker and expressed his emphatic support for Britain’s declaration of war against Germany in August, 1914, under the heading ‘THE GREAT WAR’. He wrote that he was old enough to remember the Crimean War and other wars, but on this occasion, it was more possible, ‘....without one reserve, for the Christian Englishmen to pray for ultimate victory, supreme and overwhelming, as for a thing certainly well-pleasing to God. Our state has entered on the struggle with a conscience clear as the day’. Of his contemporary bishops, he stood with the Bishops of London, Liverpool and Carlisle and the Archbishop of York in his pro-active support for the War. He underlined ‘the sacred duty of national self-preservation. I have long thought that the Germanic power has aimed at the political ruin of Britain". He asked his clergy to encourage recruitment to the Army since half a million volunteers were needed. He was proud of the report that 218,000 miners had enlisted, half from Durham, that nearly 2,000 men from the diocesan branch of the Church of England’s Men’s Society were on active service, and that Bede College former students included 4 dead on the Somme, 5 wounded, one MC, one DCM and one MM. He supported the extension of the franchise to women, ‘a grant in which I for one believe that great possibilities of good lie in waiting’.

== Publications ==
Moule was a New Testament scholar who wrote over 60 books and pamphlets. He contributed the chapters on Paul's letters to the Romans, Ephesians, Philippians, Colossians, and Philemon in the Cambridge Bible for Schools and Colleges (1891–98) and also wrote poems on religious subjects; he won the Seatonian Prize at Cambridge for sacred poetry 1869–1873 and again in 1876. He published at least two volumes of poetry in his lifetime, in addition to the prizewinning pieces. He wrote a number of hymns, of which "Lord and Savior, True and Kind" is probably the best known.

This is an incomplete list of Handley Moule's published works:

- Christian Self-Denial: A Poem Which Obtained the Seatonian Prize, MDCCCLXIX, Deighton, Bell, & Co., Cambridge, 1869
- Poems on Subjects Selected From the Acts of the Apostles, with Other Miscellaneous Pieces, Deighton, Bell, & Co., Cambridge, 1869
- The Beloved Disciple: A Poem Which Obtained the Seatonian Prize, MDCCCLXX, Deighton, Bell, & Co., Cambridge, 1870
- Tyre: A Poem Which Obtained the Seatonian Prize, MDCCCLXXI, Deighton, Bell, & Co., Cambridge, 1871
- The Gospel in Polynesia: A Poem Which Obtained the Seatonian Prize, MDCCCLXXII, Deighton, Bell, & Co., Cambridge, 1872
- The Brazen Serpent: A Poem Which Obtained the Seatonian Prize, MDCCCLXXIII, Deighton, Bell, & Co., Cambridge, 1873
- The Victory Which Overcometh the World: A Poem Which Obtained the Seatonian Prize, MDCCCLXXVI, Deighton, Bell, & Co., Cambridge, 1876
- Dorchester Poems, W. Poole, London, 1878
- Christianus, A Story of Antioch: And Other Poems, Cambridge: Deighton, Bell, and Co., 1883
- Thoughts on Union with Christ, Seeley & Co., London, 1885
- Thoughts on Christian Sanctity, Seeley & Co., London, 1885
- Thoughts on the Spiritual Life, Seeley & Co., London, 1887
- The Epistle to the Ephesians, with Introduction and Notes, University Press, Cambridge, 1888
- Outlines of Christian Doctrine, Thomas Whittaker, New York, probably 1889
- Philippian Studies, Hodder and Stoughton, 1890 (The Expositor's Library)
- Life in Christ and for Christ, A. C. Armstrong & Son, New York, 1890
- Veni Creator: Thoughts on the Person and Work of the Holy Spirit of Promise, Hodder and Stoughton, London, 1890
- To My Younger Brethren: Chapters on Pastoral Life and Work, Hodder and Stoughton, London, 1892
- Charles Simeon, Methuen & Co., London, 1892
- Christ is All: Sermons from New Testament Texts on Various Aspects of the Glory and Work of Christ; With Some Other Sermons, E. P. Dutton & Co., New York, 1892
- Jesus and the Resurrection. Expository Studies on St. John xx, xxi, London, 1893
- The Epistle of St. Paul to the Romans, Hodder and Stoughton, London, 1894
- Secret Prayer, Thomas Whittaker, New York, 1895
- Colossian Studies: Lessons in Faith and Holiness from St. Paul's Epistles to the Colossians and Philemon, A. C. Armstrong and Son, New York, 1898
- Ephesian Studies: Expository Readings on the Epistle of Saint Paul to the Ephesians, A. C. Armstrong and Son, New York, 1900
- Phillipian Studies: Lessons in Faith and Love from St. Paul's Epistle to the Philippians, A. C. Armstrong, New York, 1900
- The Old Gospel for the New Age, And Other Sermons, Fleming H. Revell Company, Chicago, New York, & Toronto, 1901
- The Epistle of Saint Paul to the Romans, A. C. Armstrong, New York, 1902
- From Sunday to Sunday: Short Bible Readings for the Sundays of the Year, A. C. Armstrong and Son, New York, 1904
- Short Devotional Studies on the Dying Letter of St. Paul, Religious Tract Society, London, 1905
- The School of Suffering: A Brief Memorial of Mary E. E. Moule, By Her Father Handley, Bishop of Durham, Society for Promoting Christian Knowledge, London, 1907
- Messages from the Epistle to the Hebrews, Elliot Stock, London, 1909
- Memories of a Vicarage, Religious Tract Society, London, 1913
- Christus Consolator: Words for Hearts in Trouble, Society for Promoting Christian Knowledge, London, 1917
- Letters and poems of Bishop Moule: Selections from the Spiritual Letters and Poems of Handley Carr Glyn Moule, Bishop of Durham (1901–1920), Marshall Bros., 1921

== Sources ==
Munden, A. F. (May 2006) [online edition; originally published September 2004]. "Moule, Handley Carr Glyn (1841–1920)". Oxford Dictionary of National Biography. Oxford Dictionary of National Biography (online ed.). Oxford University Press. doi:10.1093/ref:odnb/35129. (Subscription, Wikipedia Library access or UK public library membership required.)

Academic offices
Preceded by Armitage Robinson	Norrisian Professor of Divinity; 1893–1899	Succeeded by Frederic Chase
Church of England titles
Preceded by Brooke Foss Westcott	Bishop of Durham; 1901–1920	Succeeded by Hensley Henson
