= Horatio Mosley Moule =

Friend and mentor to Thomas Hardy (1832–1873)

- Born: 30 May 1832; Fordington, Dorset, United Kingdom
- Died: September 21, 1873 (aged 41); Cambridge, England
- Other name: Horace Moule
- Education: Trinity College, Oxford; Queens' College, Cambridge
- Parent(s): Henry Moule, Mary Mullet Evans

Horatio Mosley Moule /ˈmoʊl/ (1832–1873) was the fourth son of Anglican priest and inventor Henry Moule, and is best remembered as a close friend, tutor, and mentor to Thomas Hardy. Moule, generally known as Horace, committed suicide at age 41. He was said to have inspired several characters in Hardy's fiction.

== Early life and education ==
Horatio Moule was born on 30 May 1832 at Fordington, Dorset. His father was the Vicar of St George's in Fordington. Horatio was named after his father's younger brother.

Although Horatio was regarded by his siblings as the most brilliant in the family, and was known as an excellent Classics scholar, he struggled throughout his college career. In 1851, he entered Trinity College, Oxford, but left without a degree. In 1854, by now using the name Horace, he matriculated at Queens' College, Cambridge. He won the Hulsean Prize there in 1858, but did not actually earn his B.A. until 1867. He obtained his M.A. from Queens' in 1873, shortly before his death by suicide.

== Career ==
He was a musician as well as a published poet and author. His publications included Christian Oratory; an inquiry into its history during the first five centuries (1859); Tempora mutantur. A Memorial of the Fordington Times Society (1859); and The Roman Republic; being a review of some of the salient points in its history (1860). He contributed book reviews and occasional essays to national periodicals. Some of his poems were published after his death.

Moule worked from 1865-68 as an assistant master at Marlborough College, and then became a government inspector of workhouses. During his time at Marlborough, he was considered a gifted teacher. Handley Moule said of his brother: "Wonderful was his subtle faculty for imparting, along with all due care for grammatical precision, a living interest in the subject-matter, and for shedding an indefinable glamour of the ideal over all we read."

== Personal life ==
Moule appears to have suffered from depression and alcoholism, and his life and death were shaped by those conditions. One of his pupils recorded in his diary that Moule was a dipsomaniac who exhibited DTs. Martin Seymour-Smith asserts that Moule's drinking may have started as an attempt to cope with his bouts of suicidal depression.

== Death ==
On 21 September 1873, when depressed and affected by alcohol, Horace ended a three-hour conversation at Queens' College with his brother Charles and went to bed. Minutes later Charles, writing in an adjoining room, heard what he described as a "trickling" sound and went to investigate. He found Horace covered in blood but conscious and able to utter his last words, "Easy to die. Love to my mother", having slashed his windpipe with the razor that he kept under his pillow for that purpose. At the inquest, the jury returned a verdict of "suicide whilst in a state of temporary insanity". Horace Moule was buried at Fordington.

== Influence on Thomas Hardy ==
Biographers of Thomas Hardy describe Moule as the writer's closest friend and one of his biggest influences. Eight years older than Hardy, Moule assumed the role of mentor and tutor starting in 1857. He encouraged Hardy to read Greek tragedies and contemporary English literature.

Some of Hardy's poems were dedicated to Moule, and it has been suggested that several characters and scenes in Hardy's novels were inspired by Moule. Henry Knight in A Pair of Blue Eyes shares many of Moule's traits. Michael Millgate claims that an episode in Tess of the D'Urbervilles, in which Angel Clare is rebuked by his father for ordering a theologically offensive book from a bookseller, was based on a confrontation witnessed by Hardy between Horace and his clergyman father. The character of Jude in Jude the Obscure was also reportedly patterned after the sad life and death of Horace Moule.
