= Christ Church, Dorchester =

Church in Dorset, England

Christ Church
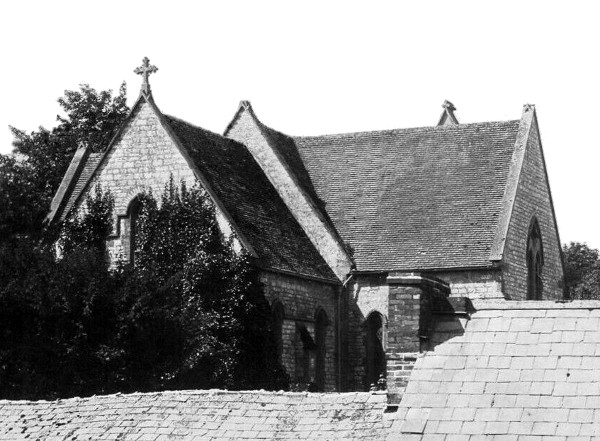
- The rear of Christ Church from Colliton Walk, c. 1905

Religion
- Affiliation: Church of England
- Ecclesiastical or organizational status: Demolished
- Year consecrated: 1846

Location
- Location: Dorchester, Dorset, England
- Interactive map of Christ Church
- Coordinates: 50.7168°N 2.4423°W

Architecture
- Architect: Edward Mondey
- Type: Church

Christ Church was a Church of England church in West Fordington, Dorchester, Dorset, England. It was built in 1845–46 and demolished in 1933.

== History ==
Christ Church was built as a chapel of ease to the parish church of St George's in Fordington. The vicar of the parish, Rev. Henry Moule, proposed the construction of the church to serve the increasing population of the time and the regiments of Dorchester Barracks. He had been chaplain to the barracks since 1829 and donated some of the royalties of his 1845 book Barrack Sermons towards the cost of the new church. Other private contributions were received, alongside grants from the Incorporated and Diocesan Church Building Societies. The site, on the west side of The Grove between the barracks and the boundary of Colliton Park, was given by the Duchy of Cornwall.

Christ Church was designed by Mr. Edward Mondey of Dorchester and built by Mr. John Wellspring of Fordington under Mondey's supervision. The foundation stone was laid by the Archdeacon of Dorset, Robert Buckle, on 29 May 1845, with assistance from Rev. Moule, Rev. Augustus Handley (curate) and other members of the clergy. Despite the poor weather, the ceremony was attended by several hundred members of the public. Christ Church was consecrated by the Bishop of Salisbury, Edward Denison, on 21 October 1846.

In 1847, Christ Church became the parish church of the newly formed parish of West Fordington. As the population continued to increase, a temporary chapel of ease, known as the Tin Tabernacle, was erected at the Top O'Town in 1896–97. It was later replaced by the permanent church of St Mary's, which opened in 1912. Christ Church continued to be used for christenings and marriages until 1924, and closed when St Mary's was declared the new parish church of West Fordington in 1929.

In 1931, Christ Church's demolition was recommended. That year Mr. Herbert Kendall of Poole drew up plans for proposals to purchase the church, dismantle and then rebuild it at Ferndown. At the time, the growing town required replacement of its 1901 church, St Mary's. However the scheme did not come to fruition and a new church of Kendall's own design was built instead.

Christ Church was demolished in 1933. Some of its fittings and furniture were reused by other churches: the font replaced a temporary one at St Paul's in Weymouth, the altar, pulpit and pews were used in the new St George's in Oakdale, the altar cross and a reading desk went to St George's in Fordington and the bell to the new St Mary's in Ferndown.

== Architecture ==
Christ Church was built in the Early English style and designed to accommodate 400 persons. It had a cruciform plan and was made up of a nave, chancel, transepts, vestry and porch. The southern transept was allocated for the use of Sunday school children and the western region of the nave for use of soldiers at Dorchester Barracks. A turret containing one bell was placed on the west gable. The church had lancet windows in three of the four-bay nave and in other parts of the church. A three-light window was built in the chancel and two-light windows at the end of each transept. The font was built of Caen stone, while other fittings such as the pulpit, reading desk and communion table were of wood. A new organ was opened at the church on 26 January 1862, made by Mr. J. Eagles of London.
