= F. S. Marsh =

English clergyman and theologian (1886–1953)

Fred Shipley Marsh (1886–1953) was an English clergyman and theologian, Lady Margaret's Professor of Divinity at the University of Cambridge from 1935 to 1951.

By his marriage to Elizabeth Shipley, the son of James William Marsh, he was the eldest son in a family of eight children. Educated at Cambridge in 1907, Marsh was elected a Tyrwhitt Scholar, and much of his subsequent work was in the field of Syriac studies.

From 1916 to 1919, during the First World War, Marsh served as a chaplain in the armed forces and was gassed, causing harm which continued to trouble him for the rest of his life.

A Fellow of Selwyn College from 1920, Marsh was also a Lecturer from 1920 to 1935, College Dean from 1920 to 1924, and College Librarian from 1920 to 1929. In 1927, he published The Book of the Holy Hierotheos, a translation and critical edition of a set of Syriac manuscripts dating from the 6th century which had been discovered in the 19th century. In 1935 he was appointed to succeed James Bethune-Baker as Lady Margaret's Professor of Divinity and moved away from the Syriac field. Founded by Lady Margaret Beaufort in 1502 as a readership, it is the oldest chair at Cambridge, traditionally held by a New Testament scholar.

Under the initials F. S. M., Marsh was also a contributor to the Encyclopædia Britannica.

He retired from his chair in Divinity in 1951, and his successor, C. F. D. Moule, was appointed with effect from 1 October 1951.
