= Arthur Christopher Moule =

British Anglican cleric and sinologist (1873–1957)

- Born: 18 May 1873; Hangzhou, China
- Died: 5 June 1957 (aged 84); St Leonards-on-Sea, Hastings, England
- Education: The King's School, Canterbury; Trinity College, Cambridge
- Occupations: Missionary sinologist

Arthur Christopher Moule (18 May 1873 – 5 June 1957) was a British Anglican missionary and sinologist. He held the Professorship of Chinese at the University of Cambridge from 1933 to 1938.

== Biography ==
Moule was born on 18 May 1873 in Hangzhou, China. His father was missionary George Moule (1828–1912), the first Anglican bishop of mid-China. Moule's uncles Arthur Evans Moule (1836–1918) and George Evans Moule were also Anglican missionaries in China, and so were many of Moule's six siblings. Another uncle, the theologian Handley Moule (1841–1920), became Bishop of Durham. Arthur Christopher was uncle to the famous Cambridge theologian and New Testament scholar C. F. D. Moule.

Moule was educated at The King's School in Canterbury and Trinity College, Cambridge. He trained as an architect and returned to China to work there, but ended up following his family into missionary work, being ordained in 1904 as a missionary for the Society for the Propagation of the Gospel. He served in northern China for four years before returning to England. In 1918 he received the living of Trumpington just outside of Cambridge, where he could continue his scholarly work on Chinese subjects.

Moule died on 5 June 1957 in St Leonards-on-Sea, Hastings, England.

== Bibliography ==
- A List of Musical and Other Sound-Producing Instruments of the Chinese, in Journal of the North China Branch of the Royal Asiatic Society, vol. 39 [1908] (gjenutgitt mange ganger, sist? i 1989)
- Moule, A. C. (1923). "The Bore on the Ch'ien-t'ang River in China". T'oung Pao. 22 (3). Brill: 135–188. ISSN 0082-5433. JSTOR 4526695.
- Christians in China Before the Year 1550, London: SPCK, 1930 (Nyutgivelse ved Octagon Books, ISBN 0-374-95972-2)
- Quinsai: With other notes on Marco Polo, Cambridge University Press, 1957, ASIN : B0000CJPVD
- The rulers of China, 221 B.C.-A.D. 1949; chronological tables. With an introductory section on the earlier rulers c. 2100-249 B.C , Routledge and K. Paul, 1957, B0007JWGTC
- Marco Polo The Description of the World (with Paul Pelliot) ISBN 4-87187-308-0
- Marco Polo Transcription of the Original in Latin (with Paul Pelliot) ISBN 4-87187-309-9
