= Andrew T. Lincoln =

British New Testament scholar (born 1944)

- Born: 17 May 1944 (age 82)
- Occupation: New Testament scholar
- Title: Emeritus Professor of New Testament at the University of Gloucestershire

Academic background
- Education: University of Cambridge
- Thesis: (1975)
- Doctoral advisor: C. F. D. Moule

Academic work
- Discipline: Biblical studies
- Sub-discipline: New Testament studies
- Institutions: Gordon–Conwell Theological Seminary, St John's College, Nottingham, University of Gloucestershire

Andrew T. Lincoln (born 17 May 1944) is a British New Testament scholar who serves as Emeritus Professor of New Testament at the University of Gloucestershire.

== Early life and education ==
Lincoln grew up in London and attended Latymer Upper School, Hammersmith, from where he gained a scholarship to Trinity College, Cambridge. There he studied Modern Languages (German and Russian) from 1963 to 1966, obtaining a B.A. Honours followed by a M.A. in 1971. He went on to study Theology at Westminster Theological Seminary in Philadelphia and received a B.D. summa cum laude in 1971. He returned to England to do doctoral research at the University of Cambridge under the supervision of Professor C. F. D. Moule and completed a dissertation on the function of the heavenly dimension in Paul's thought, gaining a Ph.D. in 1975.

== Career ==
=== Teaching posts ===
While finishing the Ph.D., Lincoln received an invitation to return to the United States as assistant professor in New Testament at Gordon-Conwell Theological Seminary in Massachusetts, where he taught from 1975 to 1979. He returned to England as lecturer in New Testament at St John's College, Nottingham, where he taught from 1979 to 1985 (serving also as temporary lecturer in the University of Nottingham for 1982–83). He moved to become Lecturer and then Senior Lecturer in Biblical Studies at the University of Sheffield, teaching there from 1985 to 1995. He was then appointed as Lord and Lady Coggan Professor of New Testament at Wycliffe College, Toronto, where he worked from 1995 until 1999. During that time he also lectured as a Visiting Professor of New Testament at Fuller Theological Seminary in California for the summer session of 1998. In 1999 Lincoln returned for a final time to the United Kingdom to take up the newly established Portland Chair of New Testament at the University of Gloucestershire, a post endowed by the Kirby Laing Foundation and one which he held until 2013, when Professor Philip Esler took over as the second holder of the chair. From September 2013 Lincoln continued to work part-time at the University of Gloucestershire until his eventual retirement in March 2015 and appointment as Emeritus Professor. Since his time at St. John's College, Nottingham, Lincoln's teaching has also included the supervision of research students. He has successfully supervised 29 doctoral dissertations and nine dissertations at master's level.

=== Major areas of research and writing ===
Lincoln's many articles, essays and books reflect his concern with the interplay among literary, historical and theological approaches to the New Testament, and range widely across its documents. Some representative studies are listed here.

==== Pauline Eschatology, Sabbath and Ephesians ====
A revised form of his doctoral dissertation was published in the SNTS Monograph series as Paradise Now and Not Yet (1981). He contributed two extensive essays to the volume From Sabbath to Lord's Day (1982). He followed up his research on Paul's eschatology by focusing on Ephesians in several articles, culminating in his major critical commentary on that letter in the Word Biblical Commentary series, Ephesians (1990) and The Theology of the Later Pauline Letters (1993).

==== Narrative criticism ====
Lincoln was one of the first British New Testament scholars to apply narrative criticism to the Gospels and this interest can be seen in his early articles "The Promise and the Failure - Mark 16:7,8" in Journal of Biblical Literature; "Matthew - A Story for Teachers?" in The Bible in Three Dimensions; and "Trials, Plots and the Narrative of the Fourth Gospel," in Journal for the Study of the New Testament.

==== Romans and Colossians ====
At the same time, Lincoln continued his work on the Pauline Corpus, contributing a significant essay on Romans to the SBL Pauline Theology Group in 1993 that was later published as "From Wrath to Justification: The Theology of Romans 1:18-4:25," in Pauline Theology; another on the cosmic powers, "Liberation from the Powers. Supernatural Spirits or Societal Structures?" in The Bible in Human Society; and one on the household code, "The Household Code and Wisdom Mode of Colossians," Journal for the Study of the New Testament. The last of these was followed by the 70,000 word commentary on Colossians in New Interpreter's Bible Vol. XI.

==== Gospel of John ====
Lincoln also developed research on the Gospel of John. An essay entitled "'I Am the Resurrection and the Life': The Resurrection Message of the Fourth Gospel" in Life in the Face of Death preceded his major monograph, Truth on Trial: The Lawsuit Motif in the Fourth Gospel. There then followed "God's Name, Jesus' Name and Prayer in the Fourth Gospel" in Into God's Presence: Prayer in the New Testament, "The Beloved Disciple as Eyewitness and the Fourth Gospel as Witness," in Journal for the Study of the New Testament, "Power, Judgment and Possession: John's Gospel in Political Perspective" in A Royal Priesthood: The Use of the Bible Ethically and Politically, and "Reading John: The Fourth Gospel under Modern and Postmodern Interrogation" in Reading the Gospels Today. These culminated in Lincoln's commentary on John in the Black New Testament Commentary series, The Gospel according to St. John, which was described in a review by fellow Johannine scholar, Francis Moloney, as "up-to-date, elegantly written and at times inspiring... It must be regarded as one of the best single volume commentaries in English currently available." Lincoln himself reflected on the commentary in a journal issue that featured it - "From Writing to Reception: Reflections on Commentating on the Gospel of John" in Journal for the Study of the New Testament. Shortly after this, two further studies appeared - "Lazarus: A Literary Perspective" in The Gospel of John and Christian Theology, and "'We Know that his Testimony is True': Johannine Truth Claims and Historicity" in John, Jesus and History, Volume 1.

Later, an invitation to participate in a symposium on The Divine Courtroom in Comparative Perspective at the Centre for Jewish Law and Contemporary Civilization, Yeshiva University, New York provided Lincoln with the opportunity to update and reflect further on some of the Truth on Trial material, and resulted in the publication of "A Life of Jesus as Testimony: The Divine Courtroom in the Gospel of John" in The Divine Courtroom in Comparative Perspective.

He has also had published three further studies on this Gospel - "The Johannine Vision of the Church" in The Oxford Handbook of Ecclesiology, "The Reception of Jesus in John 21" in The Reception of Jesus in the First Three Centuries. and "Leading or Following? Some Aspects of the Spirit's Role in John's Gospel" in Spirit and Story, a Festschrift for John Christopher Thomas

==== Hebrews ====
The Epistle to the Hebrews has also featured in Lincoln's work. Two essays focus on this document - "Hebrews and Biblical Theology," in Out of Egypt: Biblical Theology and Biblical Interpretation and "Pilgrimage and the New Testament" in Explorations in a Christian Theology of Pilgrimage. These were followed by his monograph Hebrews: A Guide. The Hebrews section of Lincoln's early essay on “Sabbath, Rest and Eschatology in the New Testament” has been reprinted in The Letter to the Hebrews: Critical Readings. A further contribution has been "Reading Hebrews in a Time of Pandemic: Heroism and Hope in the Face of Fear".

==== The Birth of Jesus ====
He has also turned his attention to the birth of Jesus. He wrote an essay “‘Born of the Virgin Mary’: Creedal Affirmation and Critical Reading” for the volume Christology and Scripture: Interdisciplinary Perspectives. This was followed by more detailed studies on the birth narratives in Matthew and Luke - “Contested Paternity and Contested Readings. The Conception of Jesus in Matthew 1.18-25,” in Journal for the Study of the New Testament and “Luke and Jesus’ Conception: A Case of Double Paternity?” in Journal of Biblical Literature. These culminated in a full-scale treatment of the topic in the monograph Born of a Virgin? Reconceiving Jesus in the Bible, Tradition and Theology that explored historical, hermeneutical, creedal and Christological issues. One review states that the author’s “execution of his task is superlative” and holds the book to be “a solidly catholic treatment and a fine example of the application of biblical scholarship and theological hermeneutics to a part of tradition too often sentimentalized or passed over with averted eyes.” Lincoln also wrote "How Babies Were Made in Jesus' Time" for Biblical Archaeology Review 40.6 (2014)42-49. A follow-up essay, interacting with responses to his book, has been published in the Journal of Theological Interpretation as "The Bible, Theology and the Virgin Birth: Continuing a Conversation?".

==== Spirituality ====
Yet another interest for Lincoln has been the contemporary phenomenon of spirituality and how that might relate to ways of reading the Bible. He led a Bible Society funded project on the Bible and Spirituality at the University of Gloucestershire and wrote an initial essay on “Spirituality in a Secular Age: From Charles Taylor to Study of the Bible and Spirituality" in Acta Theologica. He co-edited the volume, The Bible and Spirituality: Exploratory Essays in Reading Scripture Spiritually, to which he also contributed the essay, “The Spiritual Wisdom of Colossians in the Context of Graeco-Roman Spiritualities.” Lincoln discussed the topic further in “Contemporary Spirituality and Study of the Bible: Introducing a Relationship,” an article written for the Bible Society journal The Bible in Transmission. He discusses aspects of the role of heaven in Christian spirituality in "Heaven as Home in Christian Hope" in a Festschrift for Brian Walsh

=== Festschrift and autobiographical essay ===
In 2015 a Festschrift was published in Lincoln's honour. Conception, Reception, and the Spirit: Essays in Honour of Andrew T. Lincoln contains significant essays from well-known scholars and former colleagues that interact with his work or pursue topics of common concern. Lincoln provided his own more personal perspective on his career as a biblical scholar in his chapter, “Responding to and Searching for Truth” in I (Still) Believe.

=== Other activities ===
Among other activities, Lincoln served as General Editor of the monograph series, New Testament Guides, published by Sheffield Academic Press and then T & T Clark International, and was a member of the editorial board for the journal Biblical Interpretation. He was President of the British New Testament Society from 2006 to 2009. In 2008 he was invited to participate in the conference of the Porvoo Communion of Churches, a consultation between the Church of England and the national churches of predominantly Northern Europe on “Ethics and Communion – Living together with differences” and to provide a discussion paper. His paper critiqued the appropriation of the concept of koinonia in much ecumenical literature and proposed a different approach to interpreting the New Testament material. It was later published in the journal Ecclesiology as "Communion: Some Pauline Foundations." Lincoln has been a guest lecturer at various universities, theological colleges and ministerial training courses, including giving the Ethel M. Wood Annual Lecture on the English Bible at King's College, London in 2009 and the Manson Memorial Lecture at the University of Manchester in 2013.

== Works ==
=== Books ===
- Lincoln, Andrew T. (1981). Paradise now and not yet: Studies in the role of the heavenly dimension in Paul's thought with special reference to his eschatology. Society for New Testament Studies - Monograph series. Vol. 43. Cambridge & New York: Cambridge University Press. ISBN 9780521229449. OCLC 8626461.
- ——— (1990). Ephesians. Word Biblical Commentary. Vol. 42. Dallas, TX: Word Books. ISBN 9780849902413. OCLC 22852690.
- ———; Wedderburn, A. J. M. (1993). The Theology of the Later Pauline Letters. New Testament Theology. Cambridge & New York: Cambridge University Press. ISBN 9780521364607. OCLC 26504238.
- ——— (2000). Truth on trial: the lawsuit motif in the Fourth Gospel. Peabody, MA: Hendrickson Publishers. ISBN 9781565632820. OCLC 45137650.
- ——— (2005). The Gospel according to Saint John. Black's New Testament commentaries. Vol. 4. London & New York: Continuum. ISBN 9781565634015. OCLC 61478760.
- ——— (2006). Hebrews: a guide. London & New York: T & T Clark. ISBN 9780567043634. OCLC 62307732.
- ——— (2013). Born of a Virgin?: reconceiving Jesus in the Bible, tradition, and theology. Grand Rapids, MI: Eerdmans. ISBN 9780802869258. OCLC 836206087.

=== As editor ===
- ———; Paddison, Angus, eds. (2007). Christology and Scripture: interdisciplinary perspectives. Library of New Testament Studies. Vol. 348. London & New York: T & T Clark. ISBN 9780567348081. OCLC 741690731.
- ———; McConville, J. G.; Pietersen, Lloyd, eds. (2013). The Bible and Spirituality: exploratory essays in reading scripture spiritually. Eugene, OR: Cascade Books. ISBN 9781620327098. OCLC 853497647.
