= Charles Walter Moule =

English academic (1834–1921)

- Born: 9 February 1834; Fordington, Dorset
- Died: May 11, 1921 (aged 87)
- Occupation(s): Academic; President of Corpus Christi College, Cambridge

Charles Walter Moule /ˈmoʊl/ (9 February 1834 – 11 May 1921) was an English academic, who was librarian and president of Corpus Christi College, Cambridge.

== Life ==
He was born on 9 February 1834 at Fordington, Dorchester, where his father Henry Moule was the incumbent. He was the fifth of eight sons; amongst his brothers were Arthur Evans Moule, George Evans Moule, and Handley Moule.

Educated at Corpus Christi, he graduated BA as senior classic in 1858 and was elected to a fellowship. After a brief spell as an assistant master at Marlborough College he returned to Corpus as tutor in 1879, then became college librarian in 1895 (looking after the Parker library), and president from 1913 until his death in 1921. He was buried in the college churchyard at Grantchester.
