= Margaret Thrall =

Margaret Eleanor Thrall (1928–2010) was a Welsh theologian, academic, and Anglican priest.

Thrall studied at Girton College, Cambridge, graduating with a Bachelor of Arts (BA) degree in 1950 and a Doctor of Philosophy (PhD) degree in 1960. Her doctoral supervisor was C. F. D. Moule. She taught the New Testament and Koine Greek at the University of Wales, Bangor, where she rose to be Reader in Biblical Studies. She was also an associate editor of the New Testament Studies journal. She was one of the first women to be ordained in the Church in Wales when she was made a deacon in 1982 and a priest in 1997. She served as Canon Theologian at Bangor Cathedral from 1994 to 1997. She was awarded the Burkitt Medal by the British Academy in 1998.

== Selected works ==
- Thrall, Margaret E. (1962). Greek Particles in the New Testament. Leiden: Brill.
- Thrall, Margaret E. (1994). A Critical and Exegetical Commentary on the Second Epistle to the Corinthians. Vol. I: Introduction and Commentary on II Corinthians I–VII (ICC). Edinburgh: T&T Clark.
- * Thrall, Margaret E. (2000). A Critical and Exegetical Commentary on the Second Epistle to the Corinthians: Vol. II: Commentary on II Corinthians VIII-XIII (ICC). Edinburgh: Clark.
