= Arthur Moule =

English missionary (1836–1918)

- Born: 1836
- Died: 1918 (aged 81–82)
- Education: Malta Protestant College; Church Missionary Society College, Islington
- Occupation: Missionary
- Spouse: Eliza Agnes Bernau (m. 1861)

Arthur Evans Moule /ˈmoʊl/ (1836–1918) was an English missionary to China.

== Life ==
He was the son of Henry Moule, vicar at Fordington, Dorset and his wife Mary. He was educated at the Malta Protestant College and the Church Missionary Society College, Islington. He married Eliza Agnes Bernau on 21 March 1861 in Erith, Kent.

== Missionary in China ==
Shortly after his marriage in 1861 he went out to China together with his wife, arriving in time to witness some of the stirring scenes of the Taiping Rebellion. He worked in the vicinity of Ningbo in 1861–1869 and in 1871–1876; at Hangzhou (where his brother George Evans Moule had founded, in 1869, the first inland mission residence) from 1876 to 1879; in Shanghai in 1882–1894; and, after eight years at home, in Zhejiang and Jiangsu from 1902 to his retirement in 1910, having been Archdeacon in the diocese of Mid-China for 30 years.

In 1890 he was a founding member of the Permanent Committee for the Promotion of Anti-Opium Societies. Fellow committee members were prominent missionaries John Glasgow Kerr MD, American Presbyterian Mission in Canton; BC Atterbury MD, American Presbyterian Mission in Beijing, Henry Whitney MD, American Board of Commissioners for foreign Missions in Fuzhou, the Rev Samuel Clarke, China Inland Mission in Guiyang; the Rev Arthur Gostick Shorrock, English Baptist Mission in Taiyuan and the Rev Griffith John, London Mission Society in Hankou. They resolved to continue their opposition to the opium traffic, urging Christians in China to arouse public opinion against it. The desire of the missionaries that their ideas be carried out caused them to form "continuation committees" that were assigned tasks to assure that action would be taken on whatever matters had been approved by the conferences.

In Chinese he published tracts, sermons, a commentary on the Thirty-nine Articles, "A Letter to the Scholars of China," etc., and in English:

- Chinese Stories (1880)
- Arthur Evans Moule (January 1999). New China and Old, Personal Recollections and Observations of Thirty Years. Adegi Graphics LLC. ISBN 1-4021-4250-1. (1891; third edition, 1902)
- Arthur Evans Moule (1911). Half a Century in China. Hodder and Stoughton. "Half a Century in China Moule." (1911)
- The Chinese People: A Handbook on China (1914)

His brother Handley Moule was the bishop of Durham from 1901 to 1920.

He and Eliza had seven children together while in China: Arthur, Walter, Agnes, Charlotte, Horace, George and Ernest. Arthur Moule and his younger brother Walter both attended Monkton Combe School.

=== Selected works ===
- Moule, Arthur Evans (1891). The Story of the Chek-Kiang Mission of the Church Missionary Society. London: Church Missionary Society. [digitized by University of Hong Kong Libraries, Digital Initiatives, "China Through Western Eyes." ]
- Moule, Arthur Evans [1911]. Half a century in China: recollections and observations. London: Hodder and Stoughton. [digitized by University of Hong Kong Libraries, Digital Initiatives, "China Through Western Eyes." ]
