= St Mary's Church, Dorchester =

Church in Dorset, England

St Mary's Church
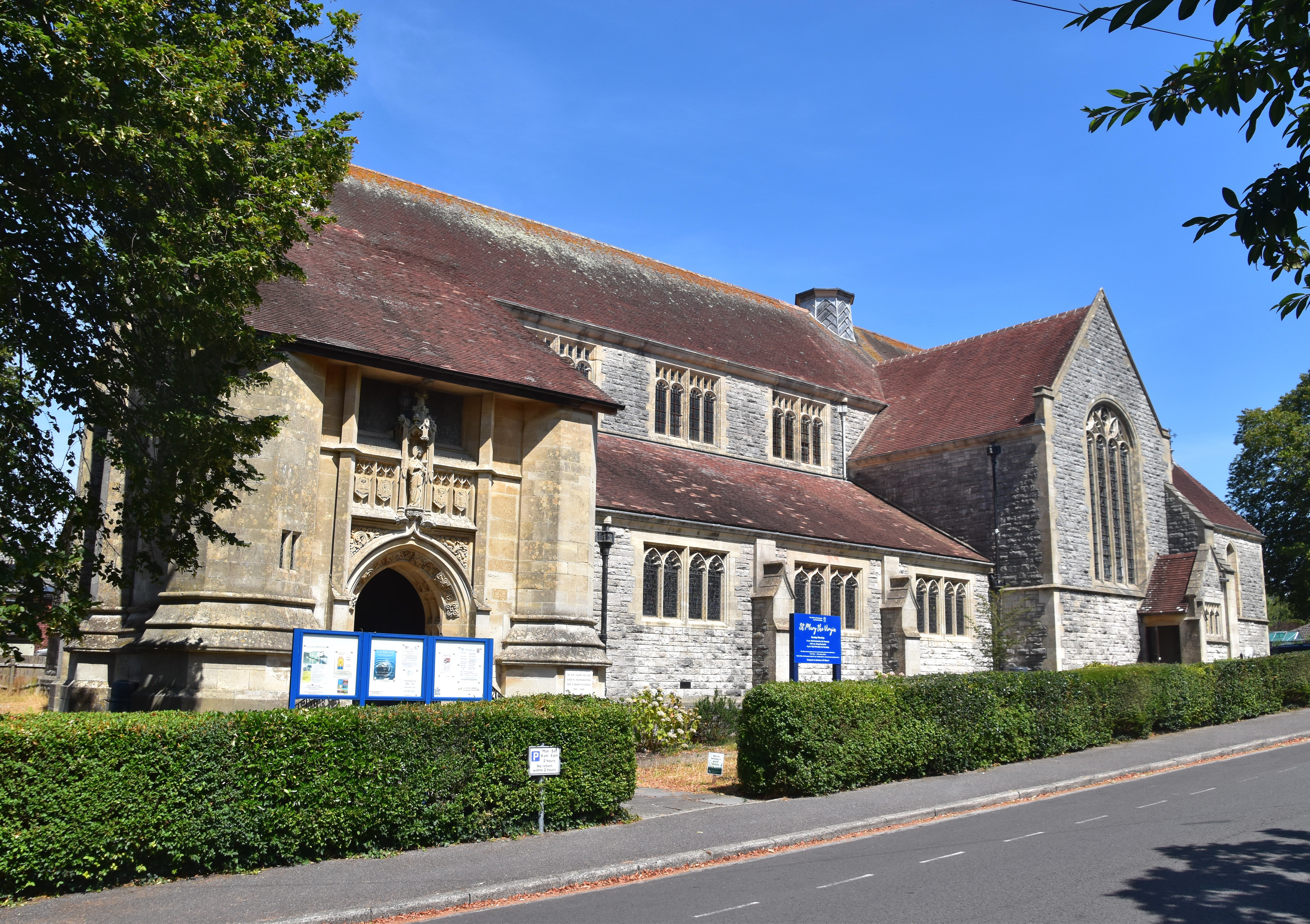
- St Mary's Church

Religion
- Affiliation: Church of England
- Ecclesiastical or organisational status: Active

Location
- Location: Dorchester, Dorset, England
- Interactive map of St Mary's Church
- Coordinates: 50.7094°N 2.4440°W

Architecture
- Architect: Charles Ponting
- Type: Church
- Completed: 1912

Specifications
- Capacity: 750
- Materials: Purbeck Marble

St Mary's Church, also known as St Mary the Virgin, is a Church of England church in Fordington, Dorchester, Dorset, England. It was built in 1910–12 for a cost of £11,500. The church became Grade II* listed in 1975, while its gate piers have also been Grade II listed from that time. Historic England describe St Mary's as "large and lavish" with a "high quality finish". Newman and Pevsner described it as architect Charles Ponting's "magnum opus".

The church is largely built with Purbeck Marble, with some facings and window surrounds in Bath stone. It was designed to accommodate 750 people.

== History ==
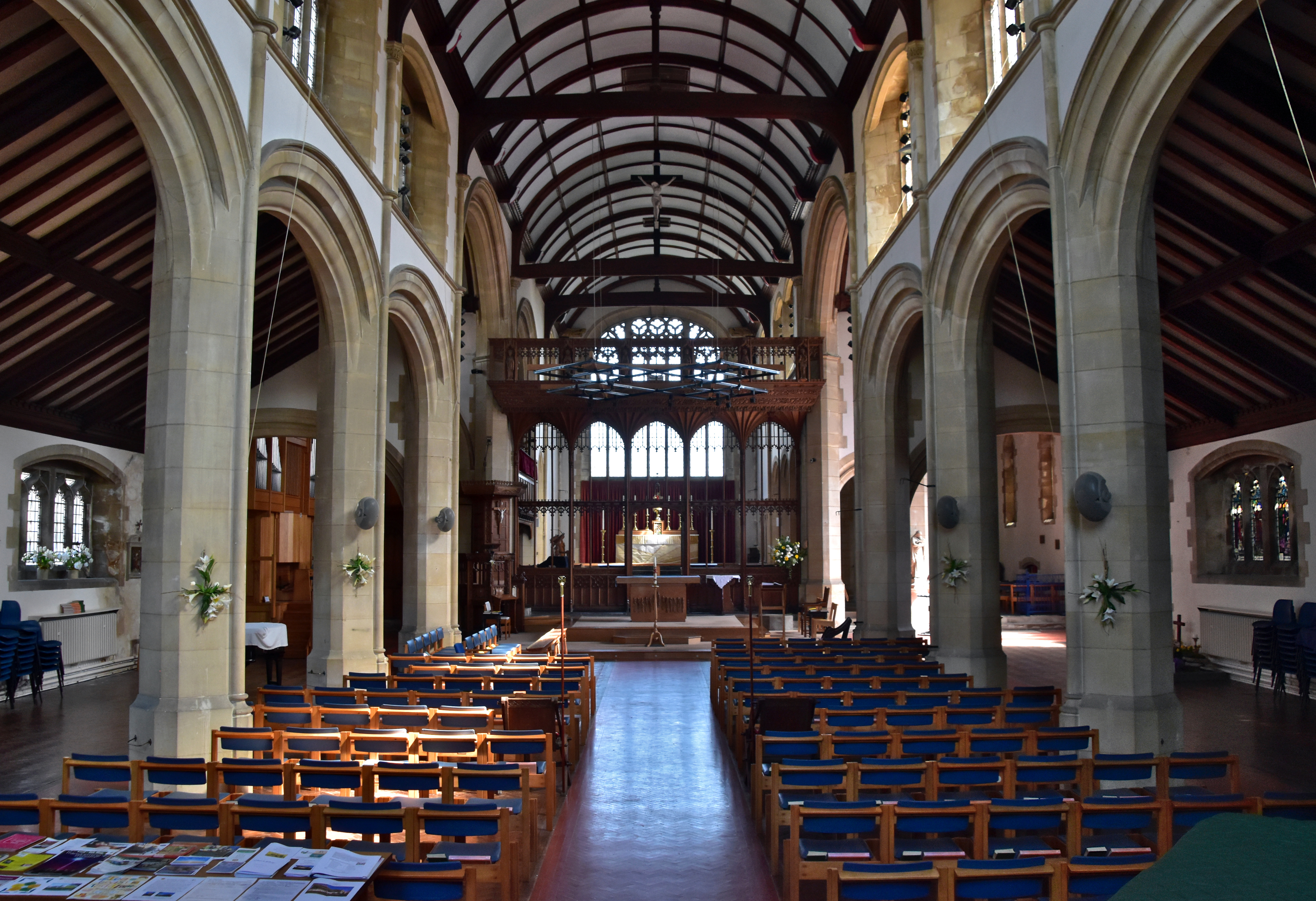
The interior of St Mary's Church.

St Mary's Church was built in 1910–12 to replace an earlier one of timber and corrugated iron, known as the Tin Tabernacle, which had been erected at the Top O'Town in 1896–97 to serve West Fordington, during a time when the population of Dorchester and its suburbs was increasing significantly. Fundraising for a permanent church began in 1901 and Charles Ponting drew the plans in 1907.

In 1907, disagreements over the church's location emerged between the parishioners and vicar of West Fordington and the Bishop of Salisbury, John Wordsworth: Bishop Wordsworth opposed building at the site of the Tin Tabernacle, believing that the new church would be better positioned further south. After a rearrangement of parochial boundaries, the bishop and West Fordington came to an agreement in 1909 and Mr. J. Foot donated a new site in memory of his father. On 21 April 1910, Anthony Ashley-Cooper, 9th Earl of Shaftesbury, laid the foundation stone of St Mary's; the church was consecrated two years later, on 11 July 1912. St Mary's succeeded Christ Church as the parish church of West Fordington in 1929.
