= Henry Joseph Moule =

English painter (1825–1904)

- Born: 25 September 1825; Gillingham, Dorset, United Kingdom
- Died: March 14, 1904 (aged 78); Dorchester, Dorset, United Kingdom
- Education: Corpus Christi College, Cambridge
- Occupation: Artist
- Spouse: Elizabeth Young (m. 1862)

Henry Joseph Moule /ˈmoʊl/ (1825–1904) was an English watercolour artist and friend of Thomas Hardy.

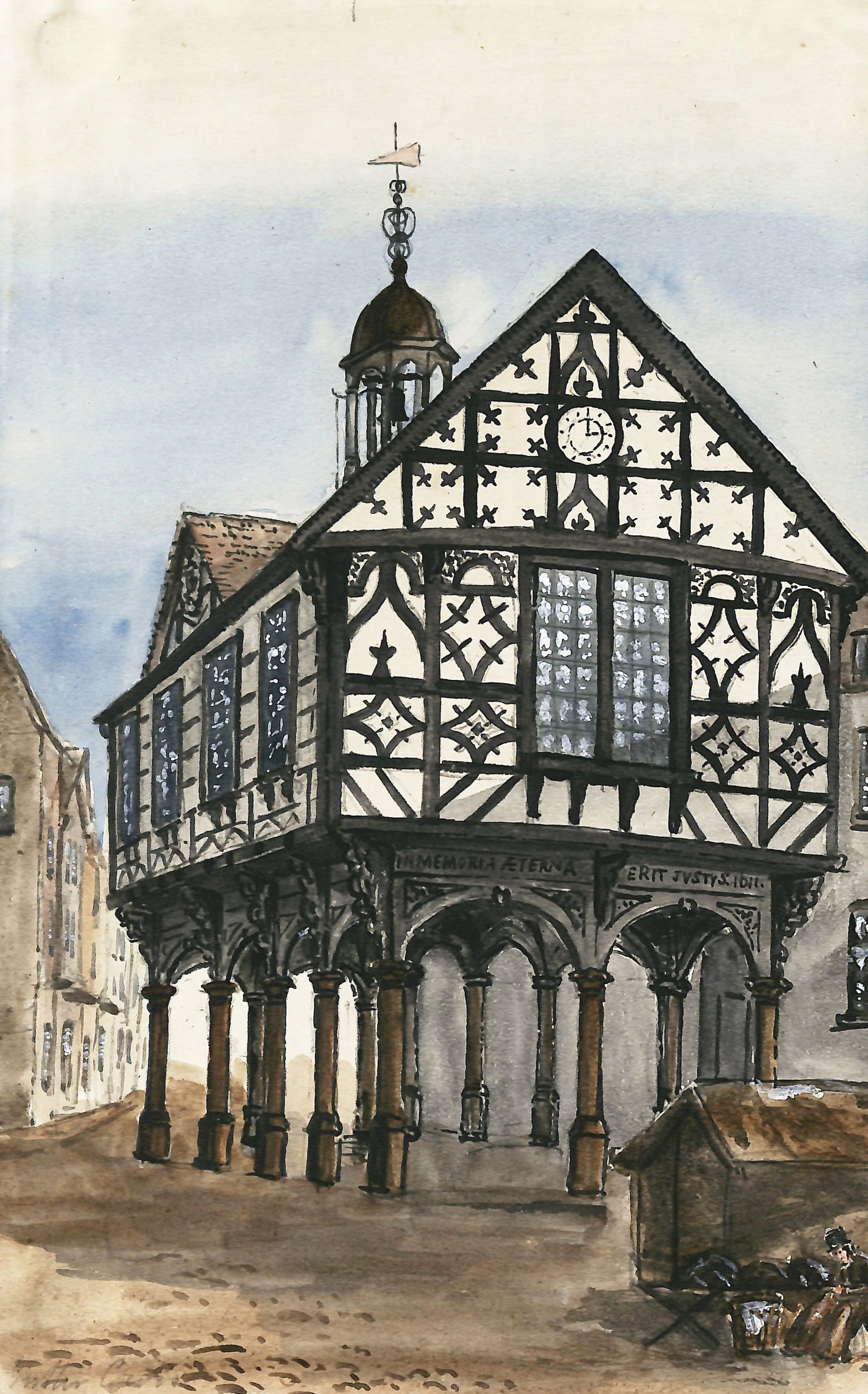
Moule's undated watercolour, depicting Grange Court, Leominster, Herefordshire, in its original state and location

== Biography ==
He was born at Gillingham, Dorset on 25 September 1825, the eldest of eight sons of Henry Moule, and educated at Corpus Christi College, Cambridge, gaining a B.A. in 1848 and M.A. in 1853. He then spent some years as a private tutor, secretary, and librarian to the family of Lord Wriothesley Russell (son of John Russell, 6th Duke of Bedford) and then William Wentworth-Fitzwilliam, 6th Earl Fitzwilliam at Wentworth Woodhouse. In the early 1860s, he moved to Gatehouse of Fleet in Kirkcudbrightshire to be the factor on the Cally Estate for the owner Horatio Murray Stewart. On 5 June 1862, Henry married Elizabeth Young in Edinburgh. The couple set up house in Rosebank, a large house at the top of Ann Street in Gatehouse. The family lived there for 15 years and are believed to have had four children. After a brief sojourn in Ireland, he returned to Dorset (where he had grown up). In 1883, he was appointed the first curator of the Dorset County Museum, a post he held until his death on 13 March 1904; he left several thousand paintings to the museum.

== Friendship with Thomas Hardy ==
He was a close friend of Thomas Hardy for fifty years, their first meeting being shortly before 1854. He was 15 years older than Thomas Hardy; it seems likely that they met when Henry returned from university to his father's vicarage at Fordington and Hardy was still quite young. There can be no doubt they were close friends as he encouraged Hardy's development from an impressionable age, was a regular visitor to the Hardy household, and in later life taught Thomas how to paint. At this time, the Moule family were also friendly with the Reverend William Barnes, the Dorset poet and philologist who also acted as a mentor to Thomas Hardy.
