= Neutral Tones =

1867 poem by Thomas Hardy

"Neutral Tones" is a poem written by Thomas Hardy in 1867. Forming part of his 1898 collection Wessex Poems and Other Verses, it is the most widely praised of his early poems. It is about the end of a relationship, and carries strong emotional appeal despite its "neutral tones".

== Text ==
We stood by a pond that winter day,
And the sun was white, as though chidden of God,
And a few leaves lay on the starving sod;
– They had fallen from an ash, and were gray.

Your eyes on me were as eyes that rove
Over tedious riddles of years ago;
And some words played between us to and fro
On which lost the more by our love.

The smile on your mouth was the deadest thing
Alive enough to have strength to die;
And a grin of bitterness swept thereby
Like an ominous bird a-wing….

Since then, keen lessons that love deceives,
And wrings with wrong, have shaped to me
Your face, and the God curst sun, and a tree,
And a pond edged with grayish leaves.

== Analysis ==
"Neutral Tones" by Thomas Hardy is very neutral in tone; its melancholic note is created by a narrator reflecting on the termination of a relationship. Throughout, a soothing yet depressing language illustrates this duality. Hardy uses a variety of techniques to highlight sadness and emotions in the narrator.

In the first stanza the scene and atmosphere is set, "we stood by a pond that winter day". No harsh sounds are present and the sentence epitomizes the tranquility yet disheartening nature of the poem. In the second line we get even more of these very "neutral" monosyllabic words "the sun was white, as though chidden of God" in this sentence the poet's attempt to stay within his own themes are very explicit by the use of the adjective "white" to describe the sun, the sun normally represented by the color yellow and a symbol for happiness and life. The very dismal atmosphere is reinforced by the use of the alliteration of "L" creating a lazy yet unsatisfying tone. The further sibilance of "starving sod" creates a harsh sound, adding a further layer of hopelessness. The metaphor of the "few leaves" symbolizes the end of an era, hinting towards the dying of life. Yet, it is not life that died, but love.

The next stanza explores deeper into the nature of their relationship: "Your eyes on me were as eyes that rove over tedious riddles of years ago." This can be interpreted to mean the couple repeat the same fights without progress, the insignificance of their communication exposed through the tired and morbid undertone seen in lines such as "And some words played between us to and fro-". This shows fundamental flaws in their communication, making a meaningful relationship seem impossible.

The first line of the third stanza, in describing her smile, contains a heart-wrenching juxtaposition. Normally a facial gesture associated with happiness and joy, a smile is described as "the deadest thing". This provokes strong emotion in the reader, as the cold causality of the gesture serves as reminder to the bitterness of the poem. This oxymoronic metaphor continues, having made an impression upon the reader; it is now described as only "alive enough to have the strength to die". This further enhances the emotional turmoil inside the reader, presenting a horrifying image of something that just has enough energy to die, without breaking "neutral tone". This is one of the reasons why this poem is so effective: distance and neutrality of its language serves as a perfect example of "less is sometimes more". Another interesting use of symbolism is the "ominous bird a-wing", a possible prolepsis to the final stanza, the ominous bird representing his now shattered trust, against an almost paganistic suggestion in "ominous".

The fourth stanza is finally one of total despair; however this is done without breaking the neutral melancholic tone of the poem. The narrator begins using phrases like "love deceives", indicating an inner pain and turmoil yet to heal. He goes on to say that he was "shaped" by the "wrings with wrong", this alliteration shows how much mental anguish he has been through and we get to almost share his pain. The poem ends as it began, using neutral monosyllabic words. The change in the character becomes obvious, instead of referring to the sun as "white", he now refers to it as the "God-curst sun", reflecting the character's emotions changing from sadness to anger. The final line "And a pond edged with greyish leaves" echoes the pond the speaker recalls at the beginning.

The fact that the poem ends with "a pond edged with grey leaves" makes it circuitous as it ends at the pond where the poem is set at the start. Also, the depressed mood of the poem reflects the pessimism shown by Hardy in much of his poetry work. This pessimism was caused by many things: the industrialization of Britain which meant that the traditional way of life in his country roots were lost; the expansion of the British empire which he opposed; his unhappy first marriage; and his fear and dislike of change.
