= Jack Moule =

Professional Jet Skier

Personal information
- Nationality: United Kingdom
- Born: 1994 (age 30–31)

Sport
- Sport: Jetskiing

Achievements and titles
- National finals: UK National Freestyle Champion
- Updated on 2009-03-30

Jack Moule (born 1994) was a young professional jet skier. In 2008, he became the British National Freestyle Champion in both the amateur and professional classes, just 18 months after he was considered old enough to ride his own jetski, making him the youngest ever jetski champion at the age of 14. Jack won the amateur competition 41 points ahead of his nearest competitor, and the professional class by 13 points. His competition was aged 17 to 45. In the freestyle round, he won all rounds on the tour except for one.

He subsequently signed a 12-month sponsorship deal with Jobe Sports Europe after a representative of the company saw him skiing in the central pool of Earls Court on the opening day of the Sail, Power and Watersports Show to which Moule was invited as a VIP guest and Youth Ambassador of the Show.
