= Malta Protestant College =

Coordinates: 35°54′50″N 14°29′44″E

The Malta Protestant College was a short-lived Church of England training college.

It was established in 1846 and came under the jurisdiction of George Tomlinson, Bishop of Gibraltar from 1842 to 1863. Its first principal was John Hickman. formerly headteacher of Wigan Grammar School. Regular meetings in England to scrutinise the work of the college. It closed in 1865. Its loss was much lamented by the islands Anglican community. The college's last principal Charles Popham Miles became the incumbent at Monkwearmouth in December 1866.

== See also ==
- Villa St Ignatius, host of The Malta Protestant College (MPC)
