= List of churches in Christchurch =

The following is a list of churches in Christchurch, Dorset.

== Active ==
- All Saints Church Mudeford. The church burned down on 14 July 2022.
- Christchurch Priory
- GodFirst Church
