= C. F. D. Moule =

English Anglican priest and theologian (1908–2007)

The Reverend C. F. D. Moule CBE FBA
- Born: Charles Francis Digby Moule; 3 December 1908; Hangzhou, Great Qing
- Died: 30 September 2007 (aged 98); Leigh, England, United Kingdom
- Other name: Charlie Moule
- Parent: H. Moule

Ecclesiastical career
- Religion: Christianity (Anglican)
- Church: Church of England
- Ordained: 1933 (deacon); 1934 (priest)
- Congregations: St Mark's Church, Cambridge; St Andrew's Church, Rugby; Church of St Mary the Great, Cambridge

Academic background
- Education: Emmanuel College, Cambridge; Ridley Hall

Academic work
- Discipline: Biblical studies; theology
- Sub-discipline: New Testament studies
- Institutions: Ridley Hall; Clare College, Cambridge
- Doctoral students: James D. G. Dunn; Wayne Grudem; Carl Holladay; Andrew T. Lincoln; Graham Stanton; Margaret Thrall
- Influenced: Rowan Williams; Richard Bauckham

Charles Francis Digby "Charlie" Moule CBE FBA (/ˈmoʊl/; 3 December 1908 – 30 September 2007), known professionally as C. F. D. Moule, was an English Anglican priest and theologian. He was a leading scholar of the New Testament and was Lady Margaret's Professor of Divinity at the University of Cambridge for 25 years, from 1951 to 1976.

== Early life and education ==
Moule was born on 3 December 1908 in Hangzhou, China, near Shanghai, where his father, H. W. Moule, and mother were missionaries. He was their third son. His family were Anglican clerics from Dorset. His paternal grandfather George Moule was bishop of mid-China, and his great-uncle, Handley Moule, was the first Principal at Ridley Hall, Cambridge and later Bishop of Durham. He was a nephew of the noted Cambridge sinologist Arthur Moule. His family returned to England after World War 1.

He was educated at Weymouth College in Dorset, and won a scholarship to read classics at Emmanuel College, Cambridge, graduating with first-class honours in both parts and winning the Jeremie Septuagint prize, the Evans prize, and the Crosse scholarship. He studied theology at Ridley Hall, and was ordained as a deacon in 1933 and as a priest in 1934.

== Ecclesiastical and academic career ==
He served as curate at St Mark's Church, Cambridge, from 1933 to 1934, during which time he was also a tutor at Ridley Hall, Cambridge. He moved to Rugby in 1934, became curate of St Andrew's Church, Rugby, before moving back to Cambridge in 1936 to become curate at Great St Mary's, Cambridge, the University Church of the University of Cambridge, where he remained until 1940. He was also Vice-Principal of Ridley Hall from 1936 to 1944.

He became a Fellow at Clare College, Cambridge, in 1944, serving as Dean from 1944 to 1951. He remained a Fellow at Clare until his death, and was secretary of the Clare Association for many years. He was also a Faculty Assistant Lecturer in divinity at Cambridge University from 1944 to 1947, and a University Lecturer from 1947 to 1951, when he was appointed Lady Margaret's Professor of Divinity, succeeding F. S. Marsh. Founded as a readership by Lady Margaret Beaufort in 1502, it is the oldest chair in the University of Cambridge, and is traditionally held by a New Testament scholar. He was also a non-residentiary Canon Theologian at Leicester Cathedral from 1955 to 1976, and was elected a Fellow of the British Academy (FBA) in 1966. He was a President of the Studiorum Novi Testamenti Societas in 1967, and became an honorary Fellow at Emmanuel in 1972. He delivered the Ethel M. Wood lecture in 1964, on "Man and Nature in the New Testament".

He produced two main written works: The Birth of the New Testament, first published in 1962, which explores the context in which the New Testament was written, and The Origin of Christology, published in 1977, which proposed that the church's understanding of Jesus had not evolved but rather developed and matured over the centuries. He also contributed to the translations of the Apocrypha and New Testament in the New English Bible, although he preferred the Revised Version. His other published works include An Idiom Book of New Testament Greek (1953, 2nd ed. 1959), The Epistles to the Colossians and to Philemon (1957), The Phenomenon of the New Testament (1967), The Holy Spirit (1978), and Essays in New Testament Interpretation (1982) and Forgiveness and Reconciliation, and other New Testament Themes (1998).

He served on the advisory board for Peake's Commentary on the Bible (1962), and contributed the article on Colossians and Philemon.

He influenced many students who now hold chairs of divinity – including his successor as Lady Margaret's Professor, Graham Stanton – or who rose high within the Anglican hierarchy, including future Archbishop of Canterbury Rowan Williams (Moule officiated at his wedding) and Archbishop of York John Sentamu. His first doctoral student was Margaret Thrall (PhD, 1960), who herself became a New Testament scholar. A humble, prayerful man, of slim build and small stature, he held a profound faith. A friend, Joachim Jeremias, said, "In him could be seen no trace of original sin." Like his great-uncle, he became known affectionately as "Holy Mouley".

He was a leading advocate for the Ridley Hall in the early 1970s, when it was threatened with closure. He retired in 1976 and lived at Ridley Hall until 1980, acting as New Testament tutor. He moved to Pevensey in Sussex in 1981, close to his friend, Bishop Stanley Betts. He continued to preach into his 90s.

He became an honorary Doctorate of Divinity at St Andrew's University in 1958, and won the British Academy's Burkitt Medal for Biblical Studies in 1970. He was appointed Commander of the Order of the British Empire in 1985 for his services to New Testament studies and became an honorary Doctor of Divinity at Cambridge in 1988, in celebration of his 80th birthday.

He moved to a nursing home in Dorset in 2003, to be near his family. He died on 30 September 2007 in Leigh, Dorset, aged 98. He never married.

Academic offices
| Preceded by F. S. Marsh | Lady Margaret's Professor of Divinity; 1951–1976 | Succeeded by Morna Hooker |
Professional and academic associations
| Preceded by Rudolf Schnackenburg | President of the Studiorum; Novi Testamenti Societas; 1967 | Succeeded by Harald Riesenfeld |
Awards
| Preceded by D. Winton Thomas | Burkitt Medal; 1970 | Succeeded by Ernst Käsemann |
