= St George's Church, Fordington =

Church in Dorset, England

St George's Church
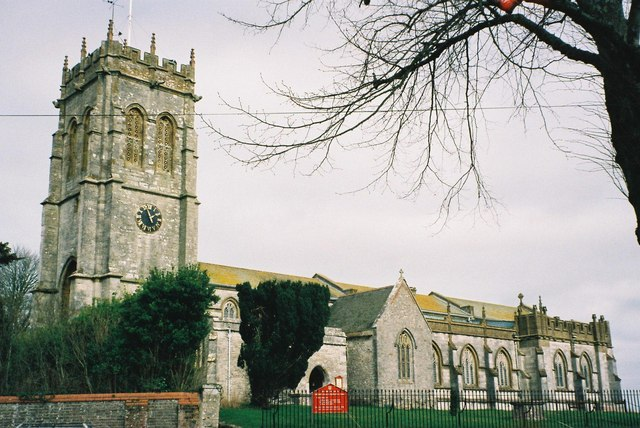
- St George's Church

Religion
- Affiliation: Church of England

Location
- Location: Fordington, Dorchester, Dorset, England
- Interactive map of St George's Church
- Coordinates: 50.7138°N 2.4283°W

Architecture
- Type: Church

St George's Church is a Church of England church in Dorchester, Dorset, England and the parish church of the suburb of Fordington. St George's has been Grade I Listed since 1950.

The earliest parts of the church have late 11th century origins, although much of the building dates from the 12th-15th centuries, with later alterations in the 18th-20th centuries. The vicar Rev Henry Moule was the architect of extension work carried out in 1833 while some rebuilding and extension occurred in 1907 to the designs of Jem Feacy. Internal features of note include a 14th-century altar from Salisbury Cathedral and a pulpit dated 1592.

The site of the church was once occupied by a Roman cemetery. A tombstone from this period was discovered under the church's porch and is now displayed in the nave.
