= George Moule =

Anglican missionary (1828–1912)

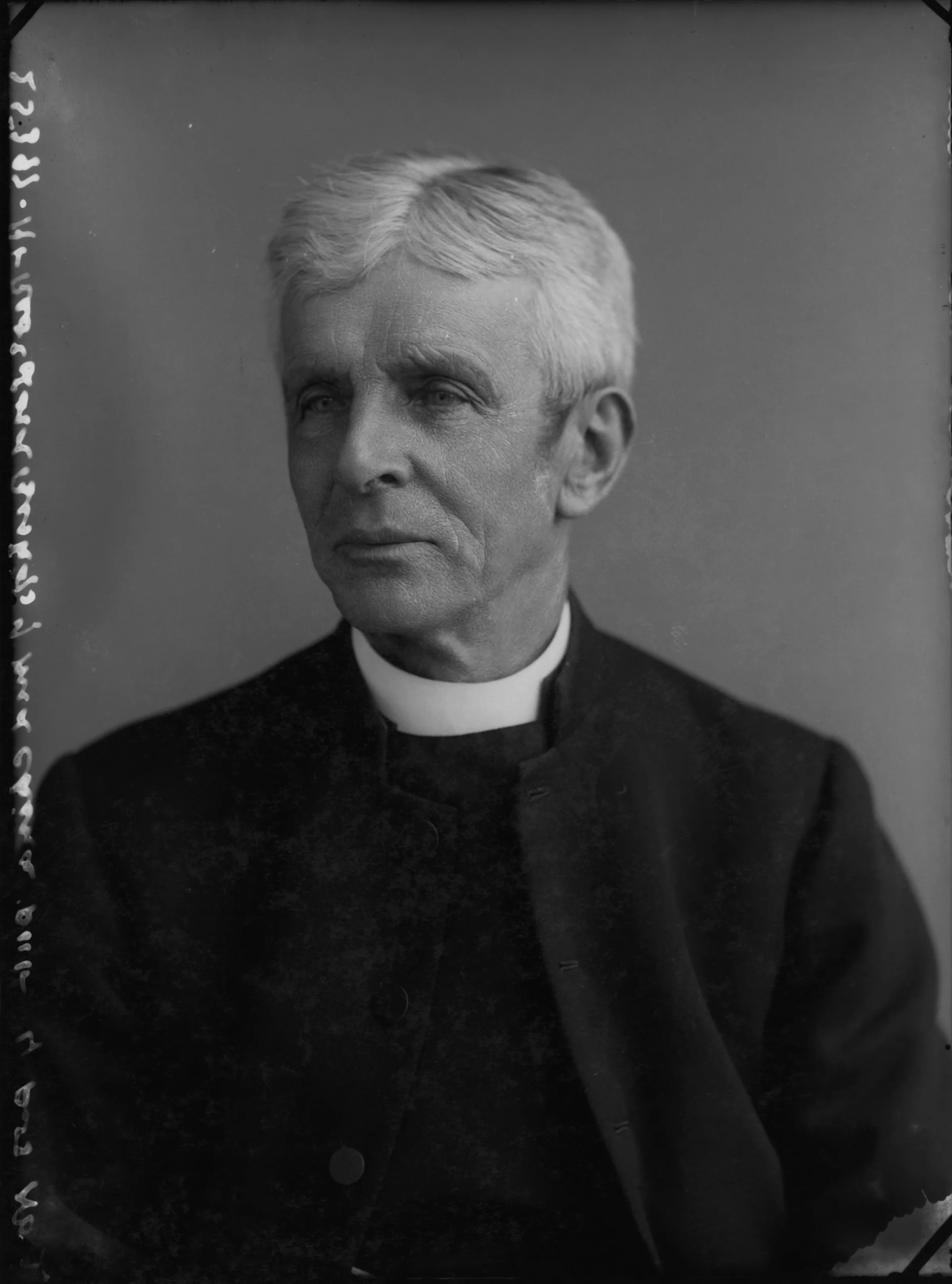
- Portrait by Alexander Bassano, 1895
- Born: January 28, 1828; Gillingham, Dorset
- Died: March 3, 1912 (aged 84); Auckland Castle
- Occupation: Missionary
- Spouse: Adelaide Moule
- Children: 7

George Evans Moule /ˈmoʊl/ (January 28, 1828 – March 3, 1912) was an Anglican missionary in China and the first Anglican bishop of mid-China.

== Biography ==
He was the second of eight sons of Henry Moule, an inventor and the vicar of Fordington, Dorset and his wife Mary Mullett Moule née Evans. He graduated from Corpus Christi College, Cambridge in 1850. He was made a Doctor of Divinity in 1880 and in 1905 was made an honorary Fellow of the college. In 1857 he was accepted by the Church Missionary Society and arrived in Ningbo in 1858. In 1861 he was joined there by his brother Arthur Evans Moule. They survived the Taiping Rebellion, and in 1864 he began missionary work in Hangzhou, remaining there until 1874. In 1880 he was made Bishop of Mid-China, with the seat of the diocese at Hangzhou. He was known to develop Zhejiang into a strong diocese. He resigned as bishop in 1907, and returned to England in 1911, to die the next year at the residence of his younger brother Handley Moule, the Bishop of Durham.

== Family ==
Moule and his wife Adelaide had seven children, four of whom (George Moule, C. F. Moule, Henry W. Moule, and Arthur C. Moule) survived him. Their daughter Adelaide Mary Moule (1859–1901) also worked as a missionary in China, as did their sons Henry and Arthur and another daughter, Jane F. Moule. Arthur C. Moule (1873–1957) became a noted sinologist, serving as Professor of Chinese at Cambridge 1933–1938.
