= Fordington, Dorset =

Area of Dorchester, England

Coordinates: 50.714°N 2.429°W

Fordington
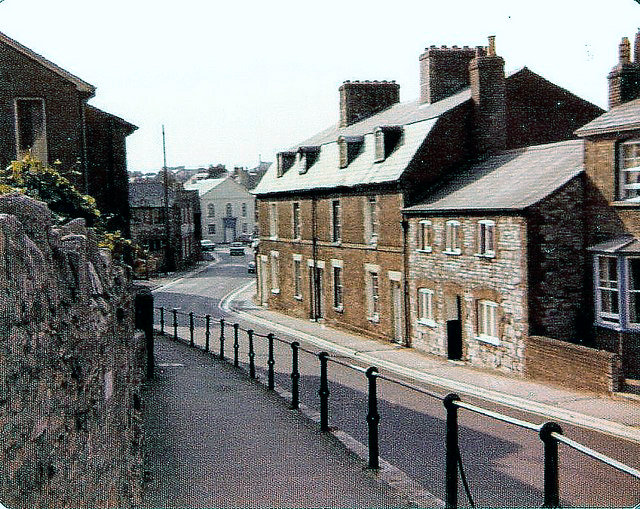
- Fordington High Street in 1976

- Location within Dorset
- Civil parish: Dorchester
- Unitary authority: Dorset
- Ceremonial county: Dorset
- Region: South West
- Country: England
- Sovereign state: United Kingdom
- Police: Dorset
- Fire: Dorset and Wiltshire
- Ambulance: South Western

Fordington is a part of the town of Dorchester, in Dorset, England. It was originally a separate village, it has now become a suburb. Taking its name from a ford across the River Frome, it grew up around the church of St. George (where Henry Moule was once Vicar), though the parish was much larger and surrounded Dorchester on three sides. It was part of the liberty of Fordington.

The will of Alfred the Great is said to make an early reference to Saint George of England, in the context of the church of Fordington, Dorset. Certainly at Fordington a stone over the south door records the miraculous appearance of St George to lead crusaders into battle.

At West Fordington is St Mary's Church, built in 1911–12 to the designs of Charles Ponting. It replaced Christ Church as parish church in 1929.

In 1891 the civil parish had a population of 5088. On 9 November 1900 the parish was abolished and merged with Dorchester St Peter and Dorchester All Saints.
