= F. F. Bruce =

Scottish biblical scholar (1910–1990)

F. F. Bruce FBA
- Born: Frederick Fyvie Bruce; 12 October 1910; Elgin, Moray, Scotland
- Died: 11 September 1990 (aged 79); Buxton, Derbyshire, England
- Occupation: Professor
- Title: Rylands Professor of Biblical Criticism and Exegesis at the Victoria University of Manchester
- Spouse: Betty Davidson
- Children: 2
- Awards: Fellow of the British Academy

Academic background
- Education: University of Aberdeen; Gonville and Caius College, Cambridge; University of Vienna

Academic work
- Discipline: Biblical studies
- Institutions: University of Edinburgh; University of Leeds; Victoria University of Manchester; University of Sheffield
- Doctoral students: James Allen Hewett
- Notable works: Paul: Apostle of the Free Spirit

Frederick Fyvie Bruce FBA (12 October 1910 – 11 September 1990) was a Scottish evangelical scholar, author and educator who was Rylands Professor of Biblical Criticism and Exegesis at the University of Manchester from 1959 until 1978. He believed that Evangelicals should not turn their backs on academic methods of Bible study, even if the results might differ from traditional evangelical views. As a result, he has been called the "Dean of Evangelical Scholarship".

"The issues which, for Bruce, were non-negotiable," said his biographer Tim Grass, "may be summarized as the reliability of the New Testament, the person and work of Christ, the Christian life as one of forgiveness and liberty as befits those who are being led by the Spirit, and the right and duty of every believer to use whatever gifts God has given them."

== Early life ==
Bruce was born in Elgin, Moray, Scotland, in 1910. His father, Peter Fyvie Bruce, was an itinerant evangelist for the Plymouth Brethren. He encouraged his son to think for himself and accept as a biblical doctrine only what he could see for himself in the Bible.

He was encouraged by his family to pursue his education, and was noted for his intellect. He studied Latin and Greek at the University of Aberdeen where he won a scholarship in the Classics and received a master's degree.

After Aberdeen, Bruce studied classics at Gonville and Caius College, Cambridge. He then went to University of Vienna in Austria to study Indo-European philology with Paul Kretschmer and others.

== Career ==
Although he intended to study for a Ph.D. at Vienna, Bruce took a post as an assistant lecturer in Greek at the University of Edinburgh and then taught Greek at the University of Leeds. He never earned a doctorate, although he received several honorary doctorates. His increasing focus on biblical studies led, in 1947, to his becoming the first head of a new Department of Biblical History and Literature at Sheffield University. In 1959, he was offered the Rylands Professor of Biblical Criticism and Exegesis at Manchester University, a position he held until his retirement in 1978.

About the time Bruce began at Sheffield, he was also "active in the formation and early development of an evangelical agency seeking to promote academic biblical study, Tyndale House at Cambridge and the associated Tyndale Fellowship for Biblical and Theological Research." These were formed in association with Inter Varsity Fellowship (later UCCF, The Christian Unions) and Bruce had a life-long association with this student organization.

== Writings ==
A prolific author, Bruce wrote nearly sixty books and booklets, hundreds of articles and more than 2,000 book reviews. Early in his career, he edited Vine's Expository Dictionary of New Testament Words and supervised its publication in one volume from the original four volumes. Later in his career, he was named general editor of the New International Commentary of the New Testament after the death of Ned Stonehouse, the previous editor. He was also editor of the Yorkshire Celtic Studies, the Evangelical Quarterly, the Journal of the Transactions of the Victoria Institute, and the Palestine Exploration Quarterly.

The first book Bruce wrote, Are the New Testament Documents Reliable? (1943) was "based to a large extent on talks given to students." It was widely read and Christianity Today named it one of "the top 50 books that have shaped Evangelicals."

He wrote commentaries on Habakkuk (in The Minor Prophets, ed. by Thomas Edward McComiskey, Baker, 1992), Matthew, John, Acts (one on the Greek text and one on the English text), Romans, 1 & 2, Corinthians, Galatians, Ephesians, Philippians, Colossians, 1 & 2 Thessalonians, Philemon, Hebrews, and the Epistles of John.

He wrote several history books: Israel and the Nations: from the Exodus to the Fall of the Second Temple; New Testament History: Jews, Romans, and the Church; and The Spreading Flame: The Rise and Progress of Christianity from Its First Beginnings to Eighth-Century England. He explained, "I have written as a historian, not as a theologian."

Bruce's magnum opus (according to Theology Today) was his biography of Paul, published in England as Paul: Apostle of the Free Spirit and in America as Paul: Apostle of the Heart Set Free. The magazine Christian History said that aside from the New Testament, "the place to begin (exploring the life of Paul) is F.F. Bruce's ... most readable and engaging biography of Paul." However, Robert Morgan, writing in The Journal of Theological Studies, claimed "a certain uncontroversial flatness about what we are told of Paul's thought." Bruce might well agree with Morgan, for, as A.R. Millard said, "Readers of Bruce's extensive writings will look in vain for novel theories or speculative hypotheses spun to exhibit the Author's intellectual caliber, the sort of work that wins momentary acclaim and then is superseded. Rather, his works evaluate evidence and interpretations carefully and honestly in spare yet readable prose, lightened with amusing examples and flashes of dry wit."

Bruce viewed the New Testament writings as historically reliable and the truth claims of Christianity as hinging on their being so. To Bruce, this did not mean that the Bible was always precise or that this lack of precision could not lead to some confusion. He believed, however, that the passages that were still open to debate were ones that had no substantial bearing on Christian theology and thinking. Bruce's colleague at Manchester, James Barr, considered Bruce a "conservative liberal."

== Honours ==
Bruce was honoured with two scholarly works by his colleagues and former students, one to mark his 60th birthday in 1970 and the other to mark his 70th birthday in 1980.

Apostolic History and the Gospel: Biblical and Historical Essays Presented to F.F. Bruce on his 60th Birthday (1970) included contributions from E. M. Blaiklock, E. Earle Ellis, I. Howard Marshall, Bruce M. Metzger, William Barclay, G. E. Ladd, A. R. Millard, Leon Morris, Bo Reicke, and Donald Guthrie.

Pauline Studies: Essays Presented to Professor F.F. Bruce on his 70th Birthday (1980) included contributions from Peter T. O'Brien, David Wenham, Ronald E. Clements, and Moisés Silva. C. F. D. Moule and Robert H. Gundry contributed to both volumes.

Bruce was elected a Fellow of the British Academy, and in 1965 served as president of the Society for Old Testament Study, and also as President of the Studiorum Novi Testamenti Societas in 1975. However, "the award that pleased him most," said Alan Millard, "was the honorary D.D. conferred by his alma mater, Aberdeen, in 1957."

== Family ==
While studying at Aberdeen, he met Betty Davidson, who was from a Brethren family, and they married in 1936. They had two children. Their son, Iain, married and became a professor at Memorial University, in St. John's, Newfoundland, Canada. And while lecturing at a teacher training college in Uganda, their daughter Sheila married Christopher James Lukabyo.

== Selected writings ==
=== Books ===
- Bruce, F. F. (1943). Are the New Testament Documents Reliable?. Downers Grove, IL: InterVarsity Press. OCLC 558247493. – republished as New Testament Documents: Are They Reliable? ebook (2018), Kingsley Books, ISBN 978-1-912149-30-8
- ——— (1948). The Hittites and the Old Testament. Tyndale Old Testament Lecture, 1947. London: The Tyndale Press. OCLC 18294175.
- ——— (1950). The Books and the Parchments. London: Pickering & Inglis. OCLC 767902467. ebook (2018), Kingsley Books, ISBN 978-1-912149-15-5
- ——— (1951). The Acts of the Apostles: The Greek Text With Introduction and Commentary (1st ed.). London: Tyndale Press. OCLC 555539952.
- ——— (1952). The Acts of the Apostles: The Greek Text With Introduction and Commentary (2nd ed.). London: Tyndale Press. OCLC 555539952.
- ——— (1955). The Book of the Acts. New International Commentary on the New Testament. Grand Rapids, MI: Eerdmans. OCLC 36238079.
- ——— (1956). Second Thoughts on the Dead Sea Scrolls. London: Paternoster Press. OCLC 458914633. ebook (2017), Kingsley Books, ISBN 978-1-912149-00-1
- ———; Simpson, Edmund K. (1957). The Epistles to the Colossians and the Ephesians. New International Commentary on the New Testament. Grand Rapids, MI: Eerdmans. OCLC 814437503. – Bruce wrote the Colossians commentary, and Edmund K. Simpson wrote the Ephesians commentary; see the 1984 replacement below entirely by Bruce.
- ——— (1957). The Teacher of Righteousness in the Qumran Texts. Tyndale lecture in biblical archaeology, 1956. London: The Tyndale Press. OCLC 316107722.
- ——— (1959). The Apostolic Defence of the Gospel. London: Inter-Varsity Press. OCLC 752714965. Published in the U.S. by Wm. B. Eerdmans as The Defense of the Gospel in the New Testament. A revised edition (1977) published by IVF as First-Century Faith: Christian Witness in the New Testament. ebook (2017) published as Defending First-Century Faith, Kingsley Books, ISBN 978-1-912149-07-0
- ——— (1960). Biblical Exegesis in the Qumran Texts. London: The Tyndale Press. OCLC 717014079.
- ——— (1962). Paul and his Converts: 1 and 2 Thessalonians, 1 and 2 Corinthians. Bible guides. Vol. 17. Cambridge, UK: Lutterworth Press. OCLC 1070713. ebook (2017), Kingsley Books, ISBN 978-1-912149-08-7
- ——— (1963). The English Bible: a history of translations from the earliest English versions to the new English bible. London: Methuen. OCLC 247461547.
- ——— (1963). The Epistle of Paul to the Romans: an introduction and commentary. Tyndale New Testament Commentaries. London: The Tyndale Press. OCLC 923307860.
- ——— (1963). Israel and the Nations: from the Exodus to the fall of the Second Temple. Exeter: Paternoster Press. ISBN 978-0-85364-150-6. OCLC 803956125. Revised edition (Paternoster Press, 1983). Third edition revised by David F. Payne, Downers Grove, Illinois: InterVarsity Academic, ISBN 978-0-8308-1510-4. ebook (2021) Kingsley Books ISBN 978-1-912149-39-1
- ——— (1964). Epistle to the Hebrews. New International Commentary on the New Testament. Grand Rapids, MI: Eerdmans. ISBN 978-0-8028-2316-8. OCLC 21194883.
- ——— (1965). An Expanded Paraphrase of the Epistles Of Paul. Exeter: Paternoster Press. OCLC 557807782. ebook (2017) Kingsley Books ISBN 978-1-912149-39-1
- ——— (1966). The Spreading Flame. The Paternoster Church History. Vol. 1. Exeter: Paternoster Press. OCLC 251857737. ebook (2017) Kingsley Books ISBN 978-1-912149-11-7
- ——— (1968). This is That: The New Testament development of some Old Testament themes. Exeter: Paternoster Press. ISBN 978-0-85364-086-8. OCLC 839915326. – (published in the US as New Testament Development of Old Testament Themes). ebook (2017) Kingsley Books ISBN 978-1-912149-01-8
- ——— (1969). New Testament History. London: Oliphants. ISBN 978-0-551-00511-2. OCLC 613833907. ebooks (2018), Kingsley Books ISBN 978-1-912149-14-8
- ——— (1970). The Epistles of John. London: Pickering & Inglis. ISBN 978-0-7208-0052-4. OCLC 148762. ebook (2018) Kingsley Books ISBN 978-1-912149-29-2
- ——— (1971). I & II Corinthians. New Century Bible. London: Oliphants. ISBN 978-0-8028-1839-3. OCLC 865488780.
- ——— (1972). Answers to Questions. Exeter: Paternoster Press. ISBN 0-85364-101-3. OCLC 468662165.
- ——— (1972). The Message of the New Testament. The Christian Student's Library. Vol. 10. Exeter, UK: Paternoster. ISBN 978-0-85364-128-5. OCLC 751551126. ebook (2022) published as Discovering the Message of the Bible and includes The Message of the Old Testament by H.L. Ellison, Kingsley Books ISBN 978-1-912149-51-3
- ——— (1974). The 'Secret' Gospel of Mark: The Ethel M. Wood lecture delivered before the University of London on 11 February 1974. London: The Athlone Press. ISBN 978-0-485-14318-8. OCLC 847236667.
- ——— (1974). Jesus and Christian Origins Outside the New Testament. London: Hodder and Stoughton. ISBN 978-0-340-15868-5. OCLC 301397862.
- ——— (1977). Paul: Apostle of The Free Spirit. Exeter: Paternoster Press. ISBN 978-0-85364-209-1. OCLC 807386375. Published in the US as Paul: Apostle of the Heart Set Free. Grand Rapids, MI: Eerdmans ISBN 978-0-8028-3501-7. ebook (2021) Kingsley Books ISBN 978-1-912149-38-4
- ——— (1978). History of the Bible in English. Oxford, UK: Oxford University Press. ISBN 978-0-19-520087-4. OCLC 1080679374. – (3rd edition of "The English Bible", 1963)
- ——— (1979). Men and Movements in the Primitive Church. Exeter: Paternoster Press. ISBN 978-0-85364-279-4. OCLC 230045030. Published 1980 by Wm. B. Eerdmans as Peter, Stephen, James, and John: Studies in Early Non-Pauline Christianity, ISBN 978-0-802835321. ebook (2017) Kingsley Books as Peter, Stephen, James, and John: Studies in Early Non-Pauline Christianity ISBN 978-1-912149-18-6
- ——— (1981). The Epistle of Paul to the Galatians: a commentary on the Greek text. New International Greek Testament Commentary. Grand Rapids, MI: Eerdmans. ISBN 978-0-8028-2387-8. OCLC 824666199.
- ——— (1981). Places they knew: Jesus and Paul. London: Ark. ISBN 978-0-86201-110-9. OCLC 778704466. – now known as Jesus and Paul: Places They Knew
- ——— (1982). Bible History Atlas. New York: Crossroad. ISBN 978-0-8245-0418-2. OCLC 8610749.
- ——— (1982). 1 & 2 Thessalonians. Word Biblical Commentary. Vol. 45. Waco, TX: Word Books. ISBN 978-0-8499-0244-4. OCLC 8808232.
- ——— (1983). Hard Sayings of Jesus. Jesus library. London: Hodder and Stoughton. ISBN 978-0-340-27044-8. OCLC 869192514.
- ——— (1983). The Gospel of John. Grand Rapids, MI: Eerdmans. ISBN 978-0-8028-3407-2. OCLC 10923759. ebook (2018) Kingsley Books, ISBN 978-1-912149-28-5
- ——— (1983). Philippians. New International Biblical Commentary. Peabody, MA: Hendrickson. ISBN 978-0-943575-15-5. OCLC 808517296.
- ——— (1984). Places Abraham knew; Places David knew. Places they knew. London: Scripture Union. ISBN 978-0-86201-111-6. OCLC 12509992. – now known as Abraham and David: Places They Knew
- ——— (1984). The Epistles to the Colossians, to Philemon, and to the Ephesians. New International Commentary on the New Testament. Grand Rapids, MI: Eerdmans. ISBN 978-0-8028-2401-1. OCLC 11043370. [This is Bruce's new commentary on Ephesians and Philemon along with a revision of his 1957 commentary from the Simpson and Bruce volume above]
- ——— (1986). Jesus: Lord & Savior. Downers Grove, IL: InterVarsity Press. ISBN 978-0-87784-932-2. OCLC 1056613843.
- ——— (1986). The Epistle of Paul to the Romans: an introduction and commentary. Tyndale New Testament Commentaries. Vol. 6. Grand Rapids, MI: Eerdmans. ISBN 978-0-8028-0062-6. OCLC 895415117.
- ——— (1988). The Canon of Scripture. Downers Grove, IL: InterVarsity Press. ISBN 978-0-8308-1258-5. OCLC 690640649.
- ——— (1988). The Book of the Acts. New International Commentary on the New Testament (Revised ed.). Grand Rapids, MI: Eerdmans. ISBN 978-0-8028-2418-9. OCLC 17620016.
- ——— (1990). Epistle to the Hebrews. New International Commentary on the New Testament (Revised ed.). Grand Rapids, MI: Eerdmans. ISBN 978-0-8028-2514-8. OCLC 494366569.
- ——— (1990). The Acts of the Apostles: The Greek Text With Introduction and Commentary (3rd revised & expanded ed.). London: Apollos. ISBN 978-0-85111-764-5. OCLC 277179500.
- ——— (1990). A Mind For What Matters: collected essays of F.F. Bruce. Grand Rapids, MI: Eerdmans. ISBN 978-0-8028-0446-4. OCLC 21974720.
- ———; Kaiser, Jr., Walter C.; Davids, Peter H.; Brauch, Manfred T. (1996). Hard Sayings of the Bible. Downers Grove, IL: InterVarsity Press. ISBN 978-0-8308-1423-7. OCLC 35084532.

=== Chapters ===
- ——— (1974). "The Speeches In Acts: Thirty Years After". In Banks, Robert (ed.). Reconciliation and Hope. New Testament Essays on Atonement and Eschatology Presented to L. L. Morris on his 60th Birthday. Carlisle, UK: The Paternoster Press. pp. 53–68. ISBN 978-0-85364-165-0. OCLC 642659439.
- ——— (1982). "The Background to the Son of Man Sayings". In Rowdon, Harold Hamlyn (ed.). Christ The Lord, Studies in Christology presented to Donald Guthrie. Leicester, UK: Inter-Varsity Press. pp. 50–70. ISBN 978-0-87784-955-1. OCLC 924929617.
- ——— (1982). "The Curse of the Law". In Hooker, Morna Dorothy; Wilson, S. G. (eds.). Paul and Paulinism: Essays in Honour of C. K. Barrett. London: SPCK. pp. 27–36. ISBN 978-0-281-03835-0. OCLC 925051010.

=== Journal articles ===
- ——— (1934). "The Chester Beatty Papyri". The Harvester. 11: 163, 164.
- ——— (1946). "What Do We Mean By Biblical Inspiration?". Journal of the Transactions of the Victoria Institute. 78: 121–139.
- ——— (1984). "Colossian Problems: Part 1: Jews and Christians in the Lycus Valley". Bibliotheca Sacra. 141 (561): 3–13.
- ——— (1984). "Colossian Problems: Part 2: The 'Christ Hymn' of Colossians 1:15–20". Bibliotheca Sacra. 141 (562): 99–112.
- ——— (1984). "Colossian Problems: Part 3: The Colossian Heresy". Bibliotheca Sacra. 141 (563): 195–206.
- ——— (1984). "Colossian Problems: Part 4: Christ as Conqueror and Reconciler". Bibliotheca Sacra. 141 (564): 291–301.
- ——— (1990). "Luke's Presentation of the Spirit in Acts". Criswell Theological Review. 5 (1): 15–29.
- ——— (March 1961). "The Book of Zechariah and the Passion Narrative". Bulletin of the John Rylands Library. 43 (2): 336–353. doi:10.7227/BJRL.43.2.4.
- ——— (March 1962). "Christianity Under Claudius". Bulletin of the John Rylands Library. 44 (1): 309–26. doi:10.7227/BJRL.44.2.3.
- ——— (March 1963). "When is a Gospel not a Gospel?". Bulletin of the John Rylands Library. 45 (1): 319–39. doi:10.7227/BJRL.45.2.5.
- ——— (March 1964). "St. Paul in Rome. 1". Bulletin of the John Rylands Library. 46 (2): 326–45. doi:10.7227/BJRL.46.2.4.
- ——— (Autumn 1965). "St. Paul in Rome. 2. The Epistle to Philemon". Bulletin of the John Rylands Library. 48 (1): 81–97. doi:10.7227/BJRL.48.1.5.
- ——— (Spring 1966). "St Paul in Rome. 3. The Epistle to the Colossians". Bulletin of the John Rylands Library. 48 (2): 268–285. doi:10.7227/BJRL.48.2.3.
- ——— (Spring 1967). "St. Paul in Rome. 4. The Epistle to the Ephesians". Bulletin of the John Rylands Library. 49 (2): 303–322.
- ——— (Spring 1968). "St, Paul in Rome. 5. Concluding Observations". Bulletin of the John Rylands Library. 50 (2): 262–279. doi:10.7227/BJRL.50.2.3.
- ——— (Spring 1969). "Galatian Problems. 1. Autobiographical Data". Bulletin of the John Rylands Library. 51 (2): 292–309. doi:10.7227/BJRL.51.2.3.
- ——— (Spring 1970). "Galatian Problems. 2. North or South Galatians?". Bulletin of the John Rylands Library. 52 (2): 243–266. doi:10.7227/BJRL.52.2.2.
- ——— (Spring 1971). "Galatian Problems. 3. The 'Other' Gospel". Bulletin of the John Rylands Library. 53 (2): 253–271. doi:10.7227/BJRL.53.2.2.
- ——— (Spring 1972). "Galatian Problems. 4. The Date of the Epistle". Bulletin of the John Rylands Library. 54 (2): 250–267. doi:10.7227/BJRL.54.2.2.
- ——— (Spring 1973). "Galatian Problems. 5. Galatians and Christian Origins". Bulletin of the John Rylands Library. 55 (2): 264–284.
- ——— (1974). "Paul and the Historical Jesus". Bulletin of the John Rylands Library. 56 (2): 317–335. doi:10.7227/BJRL.56.2.4.
- ——— (Spring 1975). "Paul and the Law of Moses". Bulletin of the John Rylands Library. 57 (2): 259–279. doi:10.7227/BJRL.57.2.2.
- ——— (1975–76). "Is the Paul of Acts the Real Paul?". Bulletin of the John Rylands Library. 58: 282–305.
- ——— (Autumn 1977). "Christ and Spirit in Paul". Bulletin of the John Rylands Library. 59 (1): 259–285. doi:10.7227/BJRL.59.2.2.
- ——— (Spring 1978). "St. John At Ephesus". Bulletin of the John Rylands Library. 60 (2): 339–361. doi:10.7227/BJRL.60.2.4.
- ——— (1979). "St. Paul in Macedonia". Bulletin of the John Rylands Library. 61 (2): 337–354. doi:10.7227/BJRL.61.2.5.
- ——— (Spring 1980). "St. Paul In Macedonia: 2. The Thessalonian Correspondence". Bulletin of the John Rylands Library. 62 (2): 328–345. doi:10.7227/BJRL.62.2.5.
- ——— (Spring 1981). "St. Paul in Macedonia: 3. The Philippian Correspondence". Bulletin of the John Rylands Library. 63 (2): 260–284. doi:10.7227/BJRL.63.2.2.
- ——— (Autumn 1982). "Acts of the Apostles To-Day". Bulletin of the John Rylands Library. 65 (1): 36–56. doi:10.7227/BJRL.65.1.3.
- ——— (Spring 1983). "Some Thoughts on the Beginning of the New Testament Canon". Bulletin of the John Rylands Library. 65 (2): 37–60. doi:10.7227/BJRL.65.2.3.
- ——— (Spring 1984). "Paul and 'The Powers That Be'". Bulletin of the John Rylands Library. 66 (2): 78–96. doi:10.7227/BJRL.66.2.4.
- ——— (Spring 1985). "The Church of Jerusalem in the Acts of the Apostles". Bulletin of the John Rylands Library. 67 (2): 641–661. doi:10.7227/BJRL.67.2.5.
- ——— (Spring 1986). "Chronological Questions in the Acts of the Apostles". Bulletin of the John Rylands Library. 68 (2): 273–295. doi:10.7227/BJRL.68.2.2.
- ——— (Spring 1987). "Paul's Apologetic and the Purpose of Acts". Bulletin of the John Rylands Library. 69 (2): 379–393. doi:10.7227/BJRL.69.2.4.

Academic offices
Preceded by Thomas Walter Manson	Rylands Professor of Biblical Criticism; 1959–1978	Succeeded by Barnabas Lindars
