= A. Graeme Auld =

British Old Testament scholar

Alan Graeme Auld (born 14 August 1941) is a British Old Testament scholar. He is Professor of Hebrew Bible at the University of Edinburgh.

Auld was born in Aberdeen and studied at Robert Gordon's College, the University of Aberdeen, and the University of Edinburgh. He was awarded a PhD from the University of Edinburgh in 1976 for his thesis on 'Studies in Joshua: Text and Literary Relations'. Auld has written commentaries on Joshua, Judges and Ruth, 1 and 2 Samuel, and 1 and 2 Kings. He served as president of the Society for Old Testament Study in 2005.

In 2007, a Festschrift was published in his honour. Reflection and Refraction: Studies in Biblical Historiography in Honour of A. Graeme Auld included contributions from John Barton, Ronald E. Clements, David J. A. Clines, Gary N. Knoppers, Emanuel Tov, John Van Seters, and Hugh G. M. Williamson.

== Bibliography ==
- Auld, A. Graeme (1985), Joshua, Judges, and Ruth (Daily Study Bible), Louisville KY: Westminster/John Knox Press, ISBN 978-0-664-24576-4
- Auld, A. Graeme (1986), I & II Kings (Daily Study Bible), Louisville KY: Westminster/John Knox Press, ISBN 978-0-664-24585-6
- Auld, A. Graeme (1986), Amos, Edinburgh: T & T Clark International, ISBN 978-0-567-08497-2
- Auld, A. Graeme (1994), Kings without privilege: David and Moses in the story of the Bible's Kings, Edinburgh: T & T Clark International, ISBN 978-0-567-09639-5
- Auld, A. Graeme; Steiner, Margreet L. (1996), Jerusalem: From the Bronze Age to the Maccabees, Cambridge: Lutterworth Press, ISBN 978-0-7188-2901-8
- Auld, A. Graeme (1998), Joshua Retold: Synoptic Perspectives, Edinburgh: T & T Clark International, ISBN 978-0-567-08603-7
- Auld, A. Graeme (2005), Joshua: Jesus, son of Naue, in Codex Vaticanus, Leiden: Brill, ISBN 978-90-04-13842-1
- Auld, A. Graeme (2009), Understanding Poets and Prophets, London: Bloomsbury
- Auld, A. Graeme (2011), I & II Samuel: A commentary, Louisville KY: Westminster John Knox Press
- Auld, A. Graeme (2017), Samuel at the Threshold: Selected Works of Graeme Auld, London and New York: Routledge, ISBN 978-0-7546-3913-8
