= William Henry Bennett =

William Henry Bennett may refer to:

- William H. Bennett (surgeon)
- William Henry Bennett (biblical scholar)
