= Alfred Guillaume =

British Hebrew and Islamic scholar (1888–1965)

- Born: November 8, 1888
- Died: November 30, 1965 (aged 77)
- Occupations: Scholar of Islam, Arabist
- Known for: Translation of Ibn Ishaq's "Sirat Rasul Allah"

Alfred Guillaume (8 November 1888 – 30 November 1965) was a British Christian Arabist, scholar of the Hebrew Bible / Old Testament and Islam.

== Career ==
Guillaume was born in Edmonton, Middlesex, the son of Alfred Guillaume. He took up Arabic after studying Theology and Oriental Languages at the Wadham College, Oxford. In the First World War, he served in France and then in the Arab Bureau in Cairo. Guillaume was a Christian and later ordained.

He became Professor of Arabic and the Head of the Department of the Near and Middle East in the School of Oriental and African Studies (SOAS), in the University of London. He was later visiting professor of Arabic at Princeton University, New Jersey. He was a professor of Hebrew at Durham University from 1920 to 1930.

In the winter 1944–45, during the Second World War the British Council invited him to accept a visiting professorship at the American University of Beirut where he greatly enlarged his circle of Muslim friends. The Arab Academy of Damascus (1949) and the Royal Academy of Baghdad (1950) honoured him by electing him to their number, and the University of Istanbul chose him as their first foreign lecturer on Christian and Islamic theology. In the autumn of 1945, Guillaume succeeded his friend S. H. Hooke on the Samuel Davidson chair at the University of London, changing to the chair in Arabic in 1947 (at SOAS), and was also a professor of Hebrew from 1947 to 1955. In 1955, Guillaume served as president to the Society for Old Testament Study.

In 1916, he married Margaret Woodfield Leadbitter, daughter of Rev. William Oram Leadbitter, and they had two sons and two daughters. He died in Wallingford, Berkshire at age 77.

== Works ==
He was best known as the author of Islam, published by Penguin Books, and as co-author, with Sir Thomas Arnold, of The Legacy of Islam, in the Legacy series, which has been translated into several languages. He also translated Ibn Ishaq's "Sirah Rasul Allah", published as The Life of Muhammad. A translation of Ishaq's "Sirat Rasul Allah".

- The Traditions of Islam: An Introduction to the Study of the Hadith literature (1924). Oxford: Clarendon Press. ISBN 978-0-8369-9260-1
- The Legacy of Islam (with Thomas Arnold) (1931). Oxford, Clarendon Press. ISBN 978-81-7151-239-3
- Kitāb Nihājat al-iqdām fī ʿilm al-kalām / Abu-ʾl-Fatḥ Muḥammad Ibn-ʿAbd-al-Karīm aš- Šahrastānī (1934). Oxford University Press.
- Prophecy and Divination Among the Hebrews and Other Semites (Bampton Lectures) (1938). London: Hodder & Stoughton
- Islam (1954). Hammondsworth, Penguin. ISBN 978-0-14-013555-8
- The Life of Muhammad (1955). Oxford University Press. LCCN 55-12845
  - Later editions include The Life of Muhammad (1967). ISBN 978-0196360331 OCLC 911693736
- Hebrew and Arabic lexicography (1965). Leiden: Brill.

== See also ==
- List of Islamic scholars
