= Ronald Clements =

Ronald Clements may refer to:

- R. E. Clements (1929–2024), British biblical scholar
- Ron Clements (born 1953), American animation director
