= Society for Old Testament Study =

British learned society for the study of the Old Testament

The Society for Old Testament Study (SOTS) is a learned society, based in the British Isles, of professional scholars and others committed to the study of the Hebrew Bible / Old Testament.

== History ==
SOTS was inaugurated at King's College, London on 3 January 1917, in response to a felt need for better public engagement with the Old Testament and greater collegiality among those studying it. There were 30 original members, but this soon grew to over 100 in the 1920s, and subsequently grew to over 200 in the 1940s, over 300 in the 1950s, and over 400 in the 1960s; membership numbers have been in excess of 500 since the early 2000s. About three-fifths of the members are resident in the British Isles, while two-fifths reside in other parts of the world, primarily in mainland Europe and in the USA.

The first President of the Society was William H. Bennett and the first Secretary was Theodore H. Robinson. On rare occasions a Meeting of the Society has been conducted much further afield: in 1952 a special meeting was held at the Pontifical Biblical Institute in Rome, and in 1966 a business meeting was held at the Presbyterian Hospice in Tiberias, on the shore of the Sea of Galilee (as part of a SOTS study tour of the Holy Land).

Over its first century of operations, the Society conducted 195 Meetings, at which 1,448 academic papers were delivered, by 687 presenters.

== Activities ==
The Society serves the varying needs of its members for support of their scholarly activities in the study of the Old Testament through such activities as organizing meetings (save during the years of World War 2), commissioning and promoting publications, and representing scholars of the Old Testament on other academic bodies.

Two regular meetings are normally held each year. The summer meeting is normally held in the third week of July and at the university at which the President of that year teaches. The winter meeting in the first week of January is at different academic institutions in the United Kingdom or the Republic of Ireland. A joint meeting with the equivalent Dutch Society, the Oudtestamentisch Werkgezelschap (OTW), is held every three years, alternating between a venue in the British Isles and a venue in the Netherlands.

Membership of SOTS is open to suitably qualified persons, who are normally expected to have knowledge of Biblical Hebrew, and whose applications for membership must be supported by two current members.

A new President is elected each year.

== Publications ==
At regular intervals SOTS publishes volumes of essays which aim to provide an overview of the state of the study of the Old Testament at the time of publication. Examples include The People and the Book (ed. A.S. Peake; Oxford, 1925), Record and Revelation (ed. H.W. Robinson; Oxford, 1938), The Old Testament and Modern Study (ed. H.H. Rowley; Oxford, 1951), Tradition and Interpretation (ed. G.W. Anderson; Oxford, 1979), and Text in Context (ed. A.D.H. Mayes; Oxford, 2000).

The society has also sometimes commissioned other multi-essay volumes devoted to specific topics, such as Documents from Old Testament Times (ed. D.W. Thomas; London, 1958), Archaeology and Old Testament Study (ed. D.W. Thomas; Oxford, 1967), Peoples of Old Testament Times (ed. D.J. Wiseman; Oxford, 1973), The World of Ancient Israel: Sociological, Anthropological and Political Perspectives (ed. R.E. Clements; Cambridge, 1989), and SOTS at 100: Centennial Essays of the Society for Old Testament Study (ed. J. Jarick; London, 2017).

The society sponsors the SOTS Monograph Series, published by Cambridge University Press, and a series of Study Guides to the Old Testament, published by Bloomsbury T&T Clark. Since 1946 it has published an annual SOTS Book List (appearing also as an issue of the Journal for the Study of the Old Testament), offering short reviews of hundreds of publications in the field of Old Testament studies each year, and it operates a Wiki, providing a reliable source of information about the Old Testament on the Web.

== Presidents ==
- 2020: Dr Walter Houston
- 2019: Prof Susan Gillingham
- 2018: Prof. R. W. L. Moberly
- 2017: Prof. Paul Joyce
- 2016: Dr Adrian Curtis
- 2015: Prof. Hans M. Barstad
- 2014: Prof. John Day
- 2013: Dr Eryl W. Davies
- 2012: Prof. George J. Brooke
- 2011: Prof. John F. A. Sawyer
- 2010: Prof. J. Cheryl Exum
- 2009: Prof. Lester L. Grabbe
- 2008: Revd Prof. John Barton
- 2007: Prof. Philip R. Davies
- 2006: Prof. C. T. R. Hayward
- 2005: Prof. A. Graeme Auld
- 2004: Prof. Hugh G. M. Williamson
- 2003: Prof. Robert P. Gordon
- 2002: Revd Prof. John R. Bartlett
- 2001: Prof. Michael Goulder
- 2000: Prof. Joseph Blenkinsopp
- 1999: Prof. Robert P. Carroll
- 1998: Mrs Margaret Barker
- 1997: Dr Rex A. Mason
- 1996: Prof. David J. A. Clines
- 1995: Prof. Gwilym H. Jones
- 1994: Prof. John Clark Love Gibson
- 1993: Revd R. J. Coggins
- 1992: Dr Andrew D.H. Mayes
- 1991: Revd Dr Anthony Gelston
- 1990: Revd Prof. William Johnstone
- 1989: Prof. the Revd Canon John W. Rogerson
- 1988: Revd Prof. Ernest Nicholson
- 1987: Revd Dr Robert Murray, SJ
- 1986: Revd Prof. Barnabas Lindars, SSF
- 1985: Revd Prof. Ronald E. Clements
- 1984: Prof. W. G. Lambert
- 1983: Revd Canon Prof. J. R. Porter
- 1982: Revd Prof. R. Norman Whybray
- 1981: Mr Raphael Loewe
- 1980: Prof. D. J. Wiseman
- 1979: Revd Prof. John A. Emerton
- 1978: Revd Prof. William McKane
- 1977: Prof. R.J. Williams
- 1976: Revd Canon Prof. Douglas Rawlinson Jones
- 1975: Baroness Eileen F. de Ward
- 1974: Mr D.R. Ap-Thomas
- 1973: Revd Prof. James Barr
- 1972: Revd Prof. Peter R. Ackroyd
- 1971: Prof. Edward Ullendorff
- 1970: Revd Prof. Arthur Sumner Herbert
- 1969: Revd J.N. Schofield
- 1968: Very Revd Matthew Black
- 1967: Most Revd Archbishop Donald Coggan
- 1966: Revd Principal Gwynne Henton Davies
- 1965: Prof. F. F. Bruce
- 1964: Revd Prof. Bleddyn Jones Roberts
- 1963: Revd Prof. George W. Anderson
- 1962: Revd Prof. H.F.D. Sparks
- 1961: Professor J. Weingreen
- 1960: Very Revd Cuthbert Aikman Simpson
- 1959: Revd Prof. John Mauchline
- 1958: Revd Canon Leonard Elliott Elliott-Binns; Revd Professor Christopher R. North (Acting)
- 1957: Revd Principal Norman H. Snaith
- 1956: Revd Prof. Aubrey Rodway Johnson
- 1955: Revd Prof. Alfred Guillaume
- 1954: Revd Prof. Norman W. Porteous
- 1953: Prof. D. Winton Thomas
- 1952: Very Revd Mgr Consultor John M.T. Barton
- 1951: Prof. Samuel H. Hooke
- 1950: Revd Prof. H.H. Rowley
- 1949: Revd Prof. Christopher R. North
- 1948: Prof. Edward Robertson
- 1947: Revd Father C. Lattey, S.J.
- 1946: Revd Prof. Theodore H. Robinson
- 1941-45: Revd Principal H. Wheeler Robinson (Acting)
- 1939-40: Mr Herbert Loewe
- 1937-38: Mr G.R. Driver
- 1936: Revd Canon John Battersby Harford
- 1935: Revd Prof. W. Emery Barnes
- 1934: Revd Prof. Adam Cleghorn Welch
- 1933: Revd Principal W.L. Wardle
- 1932: Revd Principal W.F. Lofthouse
- 1931: Revd Prof. W.O.E. Oesterley
- 1930: Dr C.G. Montefiore
- 1929: Revd Principal H. Wheeler Robinson
- 1928: Revd Prof. Theodore H. Robinson
- 1927: Revd Canon D.C. Simpson
- 1926: Revd Prof. William Barron Stevenson
- 1925: Dr Stanley A. Cook
- 1924: Prof. Arthur S. Peake
- 1923: Revd Canon Prof. G.H. Box
- 1922: Dr George Buchanan Gray
- 1921: Revd Canon R.H. Kennett
- 1920: Revd Prof. A.R.S. Kennedy
- 1917-19: Revd Principal W.H. Bennett

== Sources ==
- Jarick, John, ed. (2017). SOTS at 100: Centennial Essays of the Society for Old Testament Study. Library of Hebrew Bible / Old Testament Studies. Vol. 650. London: Bloomsbury T & T Clark. ISBN 9780567673640.
  - Clements, Ronald E. "The Origins of the Society for Old Testament Study: Cultural, Political and Religious Antecedents". In Jarick (2017), pp. 1–23.
  - Clines, David J. A. "A Century of SOTS Papers". In Jarick (2017), pp. 97–113.
  - Curtis, Adrian. "From People and Book to Text in Context: Volumes that Speak Volumes". In Jarick (2017), pp. 115–136.
  - Davies, Eryl W. "The Society for Old Testament Study: 1917-2017". In Jarick (2017), pp. 25–61.
  - Dell, Katharine J. "A Snapshot of SOTS at 100: Collegiality and Diversity in the Membership of the Society for Old Testament Study". In Jarick (2017), pp. 137–158.
