= Peake's Commentary on the Bible =

Book by Arthur Peake

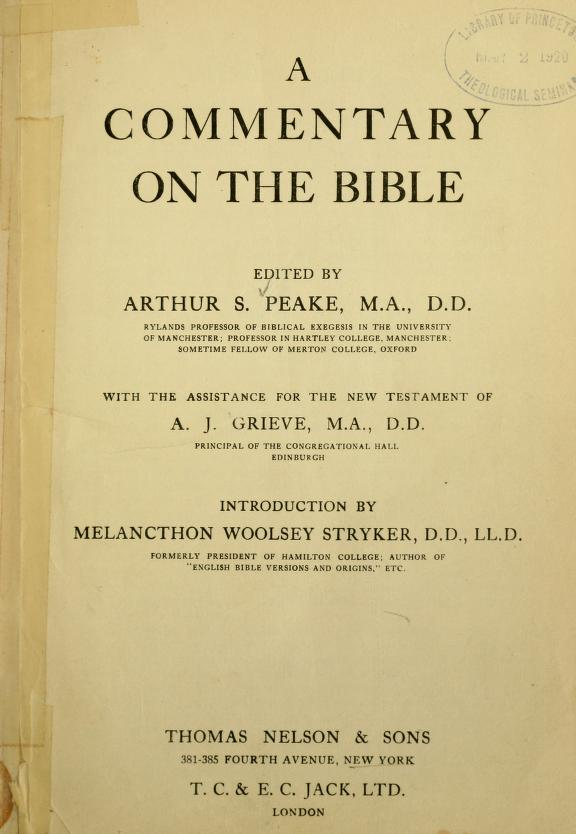
- Author: Arthur Peake
- Original title: A commentary on the Bible
- Genre: Theology
- Publication date: 1919

Peake's Commentary on the Bible is a one-volume commentary on the Bible, first published in 1919. It gives special attention to biblical archaeology and the then-recent discoveries of biblical manuscripts.

== Editions ==
=== First edition ===
Peake's Commentary was first published in 1919 as A Commentary on the Bible, edited by Arthur Samuel Peake, with the assistance of A. J. Grieve for the New Testament. There were 61 contributors, writing 96 articles. Its length was 1014 pages, plus 8 maps. Biblical quotation was from the Revised Version of the Bible. This edition was reprinted in 1937 with a 40-page supplement, edited by A. J. Grieve.

=== Revised edition ===
The revised 1962 edition was edited by Matthew Black (General and New Testament Editor) and Harold Henry Rowley (Old Testament Editor). This edition was completely rewritten but on the same plan as its predecessor, including 103 articles. Black's Preface pays tribute to the original: "About one thing there was no question: there could be no departure from the Peake tradition of accurate and reliable popular scholarship." Its length was 1126 pages, plus 16 maps. The new edition is based on the Revised Standard Version. The 62 contributors are from various branches of Protestantism in Europe and America. Its aim is to present to the layperson the "generally accepted results of Biblical Criticism, Interpretation, History and Theology". The volume featured a lead essay on "The Authority of the Bible" by Arthur Michael Ramsey, then Archbishop of Canterbury. A paperback edition was published by Routledge in 2001.
