= Arabic definite article =

The phrase al-Baḥrayn (or el-Baḥrēn, il-Baḥrēn), the Arabic for Bahrain, showing the prefixed article.

Al- (Arabic: ٱلْـ, also romanized as el-, il-, and l- as pronounced in some varieties of Arabic), is the definite article in the Arabic language: a particle (ḥarf) whose function is to render the noun on which it is prefixed definite. For example, the word كتاب kitāb "book" can be made definite by prefixing it with al-, resulting in الكتاب al-kitāb "the book". Consequently, al- is typically translated as "the" in English.

Unlike most other Arabic particles, al- is always prefixed to another word and never stands alone. Consequently, many dictionaries do not list it, and it is almost invariably ignored in collation, as it is not an intrinsic part of the word.

Al- does not inflect for gender, number or grammatical case. The sound of the final -l consonant, however, can vary; when followed by a sun letter such as t, d, r, s, n and a few others, it assimilates to that sound, thus doubling it. For example: for "the Nile", one does not say *al-Nīl, but an-Nīl. When followed by a moon letter, like m-, there is no assimilation: al-masjid ("the mosque"). This affects only the pronunciation and not the spelling of the article.

This article deals with the use of the definite article in Literary Arabic, which slightly differs among varieties of Arabic.

== Overview ==
There are many ways in which Arabic words can be made definite. These include the use of personal pronouns like "me", the use of proper nouns like "Saudi Arabia", demonstrative pronouns like "this man", relative pronouns like "the man who ...", vocation like "O man", possession like "my man", and definite articles like "the man". Apart from possession, prefixing a noun with al- is the weakest form of definiteness. That is, saying "the man" does not define the man being referred to as clearly as saying "this man", for example.

Arabic has an indefinite article indicated by nunation (tanwīn) which is declined for three cases.

== Etymology ==
There are several major opinions in regards to the origins of the Arabic definite article. The earliest evidence of the article, besides a 1st-century BC inscription in Qaryat al-Faw (formerly Qaryat Dhat Kahil, near Sulayyil, Saudi Arabia), occurs in the 5th century BC, in the epithet of a goddess which Herodotus (Histories I: 131, III: 8) quotes in its preclassical Arabic form as Alilat (Ἀλιλάτ, i. e.,ʼal-ʼilat), which means "the goddess".

=== Proto-Semitic particle hypothesis ===
While the Proto-Semitic language did not have any articles, the most likely theory is that the article al- comes from the same proto-Semitic source as the Hebrew definite article ה־ ha-. That theory is based primarily on the fact that the two share many similarities. Both particles are prefixed to nouns, and both geminate with certain following letters. Moreover, neither particle is prefixed to non-final nouns in a genitival construction. Finally, both are prefixed to relative clauses. According to David Testen, many northern and southwestern Semitic languages have particles that bear similarities to al-. With this fact, he posits that al- has a proto-Semitic antecedent.

There are three major possibilities regarding the form of the proto-Semitic particle that is the putative antecedent of al-:

- hal;
- ha;
- ‘a;

David Testen and Jacob Weingreen state that هل۔/הל־ hal is the correct antecedent.

Often cited is the Arabic word for 'this', هذا hādhā, which, when combined with a definite phrase, has been known to become shortened from هذا البيت hādhā al-bayt (this house) to هلبيت hal-bayt. However, hal-bayt may merely be a shortening of the demonstrative pronoun.

Weingreen also states that the original form of the Hebrew ha- was in fact hal. Hebrew, then, dropped the final l to achieve ha- while Arabic softened the h- to a hamza, resulting in al-. However, there is no evidence supporting the existence of hal from ancient Hebrew texts. In fact, as early as the 6th century BC both han and al were being used simultaneously in different Arabic dialects, namely Northern and Central.

The Arabic word hādhā is equivalent to the Hebrew word זה zé. It appears that over time Hebrew shortened the demonstrative pronoun hazé (eikh korím layéled hazé? or What's this boy's name?) to simply zé. That indicates that the Hebrew ha- was the accurate retention of the original proto-Semitic source, as opposed to al-, which cannot conclusively be linked to the ancient cognate demonstrative pronoun hādhā/hazé.

=== Arabic lā hypothesis ===
According to Jacob Barth, who was lecturer in Hebrew at the Hildesheimer Rabbinical Seminary, al- comes directly from the Arabic negating particle, لا lā. He conjectures that lā became al- through a process of metathesis. That is to say, the lām and the alif swapped positions. It is noteworthy that the negation denoted by lā and the definiteness denoted by al- are in stark contrast to each other.

Barth also asserts that lā could have resulted in al- through a process of syncope so the alif in lā and the vowel over the lām were dropped, resulting in a sukūn (an Arabic diacritic) over the lām, and a volatile or elidable hamza was added to compensate for that.

David Testen argues against both of these explanations. He says that there is no corroboratory evidence for either metathesis or syncope.

=== Arabic la hypothesis ===
It is possible that al- comes from the same root as the asseverative-cum-precative particle, لـَ la-; it is the la- used at the beginning of nominal sentences for emphasis.

== Phonology ==
=== The hamza in al- ===
A classical (and largely one-sided) debate in regards to al- is whether the hamza is volatile or not. The majority opinion is that of Sibawayh (d. ca. 797), who considers the hamza volatile. In his opinion, the hamza neither is part of al- nor contributes to the definiteness of the following word.

Khalīl, Ibn Keisān and Akhfash, on the other hand, consider the hamza not to be volatile. There is a further debate among the proponents of the second theory. Some do not consider the hamza volatile and assert that it contributes to the definiteness of the following word. Others assert that the hamza contributes to the definiteness of the following word but is still volatile.

In his defence, Khalīl argues that when a word prefixed with al- is preceded by the interrogative hamza, the two hamzas mix. For example, when the word الآن al-āna (now) is prefixed with it, the result is آلآن āl-āna. Clearly, the hamza of al- does not drop in this case even though there is no further purpose for it.

Khalīl further argues that the only reason the hamza in al- is ever dropped is not that it is volatile but that it is used too much. When asked why the lām in al- was not simply given a vowel if it is so heavily used and it needs to be easier to pronounce, followers of Khalīl said that if the lām had been given a fatḥa, it would have been confused with the asseverative-cum-precative particle. Had it been given a kasra, it would have been confused with the genitival particle. It could not have been given a ḍamma for fear of the following vowel being a kasra or ḍamma (which would result in awkward pronunciations as in لإبل *lu-ibil or لعنق *lu-‘unuq).

Despite the myriad of proofs for the argument, in most classical grammars and in modern Arabic, the opinion of Sibawayh is often taken as an axiomatic fact. There are many proofs and counterproofs, but the overarching argument in favour of this opinion is as follows:

The lām in al- is the only lām particle in the language with a sukūn (to avoid confusion, as mentioned). Thus, it requires a volatile hamza. Moreover, al- is a particle, and Arabic particles do not drop letters (without losing their meanings or connotations). Yet the hamza in al- drops all the time. Therefore, it must be volatile, or al- would lose its ability to render the following word definite.

Consequently, it turns out that the hamza in al- is considered the only volatile hamza in the language that has a fatḥa vowel.

=== The lām in al- ===
In very early Semitic languages, definiteness was achieved through gemination of the first letter in a word. For example, the word kitāb would be made definite by ak-kitāb. An additional benefit of this construction was to connote "determination". The lām in the Arabic al- was thus a result of a dissimilation process.

In Arabic, this gemination occurs when the word to which al- is prefixed begins with one of the fourteen sun letters. Twelve of these letters (including lām) are originally designed to geminate. Ḍād and shīn have been included due to their similarities in pronunciation with lām and ţā, respectively. For example, the word الرجل al-rajul 'the man' is actually pronounced "ar-rajul". Notice that the lām is written but not pronounced.

In more modern dialects, the sun letters have been extended to include the velars gīm and kāf.

The ancient people of Himyar replace the lām in al- with mīm. The Islamic prophet Muhammad is recorded to have uttered the following words in that dialect:

لَيْسَ مِن امْبِرِّ امْصِيامُ في امْسَفَرِ

Laysa min am-birr-i am-ṣiyām-u fī am-safar-i

In some Semitic languages like Hebrew, words that include the letter lāmed have Arabic cognates that replace it with a Mīm as opposed to Lām, the equivalent letter. For example, skull in Hebrew is גֻּלְגֹּלֶת (gulgolet). Its Arabic cognate is جمجمة (jumjúmah). This gives plausibility to the case of Banū Ḥimiar and indicates that lām is frequently equated with Mīm.

=== The vowels in al- ===
Regardless of whether the hamza in al- is volatile or not, it is read with a fatḥa when beginning speech with the definite article. For example, if one vocalizes the word البيت 'the house' after a pause, it will be pronounced "al-bayt". In fact, the hamza in al- is largely considered to be the only volatile hamza that has a fatḥa vowel.

If, however, al- is vocalized in the middle of speech, the hamza will be dropped in pronunciation. As a result, the vowel preceding the definite article will be linked to the lām of al-. For example, بابُ البيت (vocalized without any pauses) is pronounced "bābu l-bayt", بابَ البيت is pronounced "bāba l-bayt", and بابِ البيت is pronounced "bābi l-bayt".

If the word onto which al- is prefixed starts with a hamza, the vowel from that hamza may transfer to the lām of al- after which the hamza not be pronounced. See Allah in "Arabic definite article" for an example. If this hamza is volatile, that is required. An example is in the phrase بِئْسَ الإسْمُ bi’sa al-ismu. The phrase is read as بِئْسَ الاِسْمُ "bi’sa lismu" (Qur'an 49:11). The rule relates to hamza and is not in direct relation to al-. Moreover, it is a rare occurrence and is almost never applied in spoken varieties of modern or classical Arabic.

=== Separating al- from its host word ===
Al- has been recorded to separate from its host word as in the following couplet:

دَعْ ذا وَعَجِّلْ ذا وَأَلْحِقْنا بِذالْ – بِالشَحْمِ إِنّا قَدْ مَلِلْناهُ بَجَلْ

The al- in بذال has been recorded both with and without the alif. It has been stripped from its host word شحم because of the meter of the couplet. It has then been repeated in the second half of the couplet reattached to its host. This happened very rarely and, even then, has been recorded only in poetry.

== Lexicology ==
=== Definiteness ===
The primary and most profuse function of al- is to render the following word definite. This is known as تعريف العهد taʿrīf al-ʿahd. This function is of two types:

- ذكري ḏikriyy: when the word being referred to has already been mentioned. An example is found in the word messenger in "We had sent to Pharaoh a messenger. But Pharaoh disobeyed the messenger..." (Qur'an 73:15-6).
- ذهني ḏihniyy: when the word being referred to is understood by the listener. An example is found in the word battle in "The battle is getting worse; I think we should retreat."

There is also a special type of ḏihniyy known as "the al- for غلبة ḡalabah”. The noun on which the al- is prefixed, in this case, is never explicitly mentioned but the listener knows what is being referred to. For example, the word الكتاب al-kitāb (the book) may actually refer to the classical book of Arabic grammar written by Sibawayh. Whenever grammarians talk about "the book", this is what they mean and it is always understood without explanation.

=== Class nouns ===
One of the functions of al- is to render the noun onto which it is prefixed a class noun (Arabic: اِسْم جِنس, romanized: ism jins). For example, the word الأسد “al-asad” can mean ‘the lion’, referring to a specific lion, or ‘the lion’ in the sense ‘the lion is a dangerous animal’.

Notice that the meaning connoted by this function of al- is indefinite, which is in stark contrast with the primary function of the definite article. Because of this meaning, the noun following al- can be grammatically indefinite and one may, for example, modify the noun without the use of a relative pronoun. An example of this is seen in the following couplet of poetry:

وَلَقَدْ أَمُرُّ عَلى اللَئيمِ يَسُبُّني – فَمَضَيْتُ ثُمَّتَ قُلْتُ لا يَعْنيني

==== Encompassing a genus ====
Al- may be used to encompass all the individuals of a genus (Arabic: استغراق الجِنس). For example, الأسد “al-asad” can be used to mean ‘all lions’. This function is called استغراق istighrāq. One is encouraged to use caution when employing this form of al- as it may be confused with its other meanings.

In order for al- to be in this capacity, it is necessary that it be interchangeable with the word كل kull 'all, every'. Some classical grammarians assert that this kull may be figurative, in which case al-, in this capacity, would be a form of exaggeration.

The most well known use of al- in this meaning occurs twice in the Qur'anic verse 1:1, الحمد لله رب العالمين (all praise is due to Allah, lord of all the worlds).

=== Indicating presence ===
Al- is often used in words to indicate the presence of something. For example, اليوم “al-yawm” means ‘this day’ i.e. ‘today’. In modern Arabic, this function is largely idiomatic and does not carry over to new words.

=== At the beginning of names ===
Al- may be prefixed to names that are derived from Arabic nouns. This function is known as لمح الصفة lamḥ aṣ-ṣifah. The purpose of doing this is to point toward the meaning of the one named. For example, the name عادل ‘Adil (meaning 'just') may be read العادل "al-‘Adil" to allude to the fact that ‘Adil is a just person.

In modern Arabic, however, this type of al- is largely idiomatic. That is to say, names traditionally prefixed with al- are kept as such and names without al- are also kept as such; the connotation of this al- is ignored.

When it comes to alphabetic ordering, some sources will list names according to the al- while others will ignore it.

=== Extra ===
Al- is sometimes prefixed to words without giving any grammatical benefit. This may occur in poetry, in which case the purpose may be to maintain metre, rhythm, or rhyme.

It may also occur elsewhere to give a rhetorical benefit. For example, the al- attached to the relative pronoun الذي al-ladhī (that/which/etc) is considered to be extra (Arabic: زائدة, romanized: zāʾidah), because relative pronouns are already definite and there is no use for the al-. Al- is perpetually and necessarily attached to this word in most Arabic dialects. Thus its purpose is not a lexical or grammatical one, but a rhetorical one.

In the above example, the extra al- is necessary. There are other cases where it is extra but not necessary. An example is in the following phrase:

ادخلوا الأول فالأول

The word أول “awwal” (first) is considered حال “ḥāl” (a type of object in grammar) in the above phrase. This type of object is typically indefinite according to most classical and modern grammarians. So the al- attached to it is unnecessarily extra.

=== Miscellaneous ===
- Jamīl Shāmi asserts that there is a type of al- that connotes the essence of something. For example, "And we made from water every living thing ..." (Qur'an 21:30) can be translated as "And we made from the essence of water (i.e., from the compound H_{2}O) every living thing ..."
- Shāmi also cites a usage of al- as an interrogative particle. For example, ال فعلت al fa‘alta (did you do it?). Notice that the al- stands alone and un-prefixed here.

== Grammar ==
=== At the beginning of particles (ḥarf) and verbs (fi‘l) ===
Al- is a particle (ḥarf) in the Arabic language. Like most (but not all) particles, it is not prefixed to other particles. That is because particles are never in need of any of the lexical meanings or grammatical inflections provided by al-.

Similarly, al- is not prefixed to verbs. However, it has been seen on verbs in poetry, as in the following couplets by Dhu al-Kharq al-Tahawi (ذو الخرق الطهوي):

يقول الخَنى وأبغَضُ العُجْمِ ناطقا – الى ربنا موتُ الحِمارِ اليُجَدّعُ

ويَستخرج اليَرْبوعَ مِن نافِقائِه – ومِن جُحْرِه بالشيحَةِ اليَتقصّعُ

Several opinions exist to explain this aberrant al-. The following précis is of different Arabic scholars' views as given in Khizanat al-Adab. One view is that al- is a relative pronoun here, similar to alladhī (الذي), allatī (التي), etc. in Arabic. This is the view of Ibn Hisham and Al-Akhfash al-Akbar. This opinion is in harmony with the form of the general relative pronoun (alli, illi, al) in most Arabic dialects nowadays. If this view is correct, this aberrant al- does not follow the sun and moon letters rule.

Al- may also be used to turn verbs in the imperfect, passive state into adjectives in a limited set of circumstances. This is employed to show ability/possibility, or with the use of another particle ("-la-"), inability/impossibility as is related to the definite word the resulting adjective modifies. Examples: Al-yurā : the see-able; al-yu'kal : the edible; al-la-yurā : the un-see-able; al-la-silkī : the wire-less [device]; etc.

When al- occurs in places where we would not normally expect it, it is considered extra as far as grammar and lexicology are concerned. This is the view of al-Kisā’ī.

Al- is used by poets to complete the meter of the verse under poetic license. This is the view of Ibn Malik, the author of the Alfiyyah; it is rejected by the author of the Khizānat al-Adab.

=== At the beginning of nouns (ism) ===
The terms noun and ism have been used synonymously in this section

Because nouns require the functions provided by al- (namely definiteness), al- is prefixed to them. Ism, as defined in classical Arabic grammar, includes all parts of speech save particles and verbs: nouns, pronouns, adjectives, adverbs, etc.

As a general rule, al- may be prefixed to any ism, regardless of gender, plurality, grammatical case, etc. However, this rule has some pathological caveats. That is, there are some nouns that al- may never be prefixed to, and there are others that al- must always be prefixed to.

==== Prohibited prefixation ====
===== Nouns that do not inflect for definiteness =====
The definite article al- is not typically prefixed to nouns that do not inflect for definiteness. Examples include the interrogative مَن man 'who'.

===== Already definite nouns =====
The definite article al- is not typically prefixed to nouns that are already definite. Examples include personal pronouns, relative pronouns, demonstrative pronouns, nouns already prefixed with al-, etc.

Exceptions to this include the prefixation of al- to the relative pronoun الذي (see #Extra) and to proper nouns (see #At the beginning of names). As a concrete example, al- has been recorded at the beginning of a demonstrative pronoun, as in the following poetic verse:

فإن الأولاء يعلمونكَ مِنهمُ

===== The genitival construction (iḍāfa) =====
Al- is not prefixed to non-final nouns in a genitival construction (Iḍāfa). For example, in شوارع المدينة shawāri‘ al-madīna (the city’s streets), the word شوارع is a non-final noun in the genitival construction. Hence, it cannot be prefixed with al- (it is already definite by virtue of the construction).

Exceptions to this include genitival constructions where the first noun is a participle and the second noun is its object. This can be done if one of the following conditions is met.

- the first noun is dual; e.g. الضاربا زيد
- the first noun is sound masculine plural; e.g. الضاربو زيد
- the second noun also has al-; e.g. الضارب الرجل
- the second noun is the first noun of another genitival construction, and the second noun in this other construction has al-; e.g. الضارب رأسِ الرجلِ
- the second noun is suffixed to a pronoun which refers to a noun that has al-; e.g. مررتُ بالرجل الضاربِ غلامِه

Al- has also been seen in poetic verses prefixed to non-final nouns in a genitival construction. An example is in the following couplet:

مِن القوم الرسولُ الله منهم – لهم دانَتْ رِقابُ بني مَعَدٍّ

Furthermore, the grammatical school of Kufa allows al- on the first noun in a genitival construction if it is a number. For example, the phrase ثلاثة أقلام “thalāthat aqlām” (three pens) may be read الثلاثة أقلام “al-thalāthat aqlām”.

===== Vocation =====
According to the Basra school of classical grammar, al- does not typically follow the particles of vocation. For example, one will not say يا الرجل “yā ar-rajul” (O the man).

The proponents of the Basra camp give two exceptions.

- the word “Allah”; one may say يا الله “yā Allah” (O God) with or without pronouncing the hamza in “Allah”.
- direct quotation; one may say, for example, يا الحسن “yā al-Ḥasan” (O al-Hasan) to someone named al-Hasan.

However, the Kufa camp of classical grammar, as well as many modern grammarians, allow al- to be prefixed to the object of vocation almost unconditionally. An example is given in the following couplet of poetry:

مِن أجْلِكِ يا التي تَيَّمْتِ قلبي – وأنتِ بحيلةٌ بالوُدِّ عَنّي

Under this scheme, if the object of vocation is a single word and it is feminine, the particle of vocation will be followed by the particle أيّتها ayyatuhā. And if it is masculine, it will be followed by the particle أيّها ayyuhā.

===== Nunation (tanwīn) =====
According to the classical grammarians Farrā and Kasā’ī, the overarching purpose of nunation is to differentiate between nouns and verbs. Thus a noun is given nunation so that it won’t be confused with a verb; for example the name جعفر would have been confused with a quadriliteral verb had it not been for nunation. Additionally, we know that al- is not prefixed to verbs. Therefore, when al- is prefixed to a noun, there is no longer any danger of the noun being confused with a verb, and so the nunation is no longer needed. Hence, no noun has both al- and nunation simultaneously.

However, there are some types of nunation whose purpose is not to differentiate between nouns and verbs. Such types include تنوين ترنّم tanwīn tarannum (a type of nunation converted from an alif at the end of poetic couplets) and تنوين غالي tanwīn ḡālī (a type of nunation used to maintain the metre of a poem).

An example of the first type in conjunction with al- is found in the following couplet of poetry:

أقِلّي اللَومَ عاذِلَ والعِتابَن – وقُولي إنْ أصَبْتُ لقد أصابَنْ

And an example of the second type in conjunction with al- is found in the verse below:

وقاتِمِ الأعْماقِ خاوي المُخْتَرَقْنْ

==== Necessary prefixation ====
There are some nouns that are invariably seen with al-. Examples include the relative pronoun الذي al-ladhī (that/which/etc).

==== Al- on numbers ====
Al- may be prefixed to the first part of a number between 11 and 19. For example, أحد عشر aḥada ‘ashar (eleven) may be read as الأحد عشر "al-aḥada ‘ashar".

In the case of a compound number (21-29, 31-39, ..., 91-99), al- may be prefixed to both parts. For example, واحد وعشرون wāḥid wa-‘ishrūn (twenty-one) may be read as الواحد والعشرون "al-wāḥid wa-al-‘ishrūn".

==== Al- on participles ====
When al- is prefixed to a participle, it acts like a relative pronoun. For the purposes of this rule, participles include اسم فاعل ism fāʿil (the active participle), اسم مفعول ism mafʿūl (the passive participle), الصفة المشبهة aṣ-ṣifah al-mušabbahah (another participle in Arabic), etc. For example, مررت بالراكب خيله marartu bi-r-rākibi ḵaylahu. This is translated as “I passed by the man who was riding his steed” as opposed to something like “I passed by the rider of his steed.” Consequently, all the rules of Arabic relative pronouns and their clauses will apply here.

It is widely accepted in Arabic grammar that a participle can carry tense. This tense, however, is typically limited to the present and future. But when we use the above construction, the past can be connoted by the participle as well due to the nature of relative clauses. For example, one may say مررت بالراكب خيله أمس marartu bi-r-rākibi ḵaylahu ʾamsi (I passed by the man who was riding his steed yesterday).

Some grammarians, however, say that it is only the past that can be connoted in this construction; the option of connoting the present and future is no longer available. And others say that no tense at all can be connoted.

==== Effects of al- on grammatical case ====
Al- has very few contributions to the grammatical case of a noun. However, it is worth mentioning that it turns second-declension nouns (ghayr munṣarif) into first declension nouns by allowing the kasra vowel.

Moreover, al- brings back the ي letter in an ism manqūṣ that is in the nominative or genitive case. Without the al-, the ي in such nouns is omitted and replaced by nunation.

== In other languages ==
The article was borrowed along with a large number of Arabic nouns into the Iberian Romance languages. (See Al-Andalus.) Portuguese, for example, acquired some 1,200 Arabic words between the 9th and 13th centuries, such as aldeia "village" (from الضيعة alḍaiʿa), alface "lettuce" (from الخس alxas), armazém "warehouse" (from المخزن almaxzan), and azeite "olive oil" (from الزيت azzait). It even appears on non-Arabic vocabulary, such as enxofre "sulfur" (also xofre, from late classical Latin sulfur; the prefix nasalizes before x). Spanish has a similar inventory, such as alfombra "carpet" and algodón "cotton", including such Arabic–Latinate doublets as aceituna and oliva "olive", alacrán and escorpión "scorpion", alcancía and hucha "piggy bank", as well as azufre ~ zufre "sulfur".

Whether through the Iberian languages or by other routes, such as the technical vocabulary borrowed by various European languages during the adoption of Arab mathematics and science, a number of English words contain the Arabic definite article. These include alcove, alcohol, albatross, alfalfa, algebra, algorithm, alchemy, alkaline, alembic, elixir, artichoke, acequia, adobe, aniline, apricot, aubergine, azimuth, and the names of stars such as Algol.

In azure, from لازورد lāzūard, the initial l of the word was lost due to being mistaken as the Arabic article; it is retained in lazurite and in the compound lapis lazuli. In lute, from العود al-ʿūd, the a of the article was dropped, but the l retained; compare oud.

The al- article is also used in Urdu mostly relating to personal names of Arabic origin and in words which are imported from Arabic mostly related to religious, administrative and scientific vocabulary. The most common al- words in Urdu are بالکل (bil-kul) meaning "exactly" and فی الحال (fil-hal) meaning "currently".

== See also ==
- Arabic grammar
- Arabic phonology
- Grammatical particle
- Influence of Arabic on other languages
- Sun and moon letters
