= Peter Ackroyd (biblical scholar) =

British scholar and priest

The Reverend Peter Ackroyd
- Born: Peter Runham Ackroyd; 15 September 1917; Derby, Derbyshire, England
- Died: 23 January 2005 (aged 87); Littleport, Cambridgeshire, England

Academic background
- Education: Harrow County School for Boys
- Alma mater: Downing College, Cambridge; University of London; Trinity College, Cambridge
- Thesis: The problem of Maccabean psalms, with special reference to the psalms of Solomon (1945)

Academic work
- Discipline: Biblical studies
- Sub-discipline: Old Testament studies; Exegesis; Second Temple period; Biblical theology; history of the Bible
- Institutions: University of Leeds; University of Cambridge; University of London; King's College, London

Peter Runham Ackroyd (15 September 1917 – 23 January 2005) was a British Biblical scholar, Anglican priest, and former Congregational minister. From 1961 to 1982, he was the Samuel Davidson Professor of Old Testament Studies at the University of London. He was also President of the Society for Old Testament Study in 1972.

Ackroyd was born in Bristol, and brought up and educated in London. He studied languages at Downing College, Cambridge, and then theology at the University of London. Returning to Cambridge, where he joined Trinity College, Cambridge, he completed his Doctor of Philosophy degree in 1945.

Ackroyd was ordained a Congregational minister in 1940, and ministered at two churches in the 1940s. Having left his ministry to return to academia, he was drawn to Anglicanism in the 1950s and was ordained in the Church of England in 1958. He ministered at Holy Trinity Church, Cambridge, from 1957 to 1961; his only parish post. He was later a Select Preacher at both the University of Cambridge and the University of Oxford.

Ackroyd's academic career started as a lecturer at the University of Leeds (1948–1952), before being appointed a lecturer at the University of Cambridge (1952–1961). In 1961, he joined the University of London as the Samuel Davidson Professor of Old Testament Studies. He held this professorship until his retirement in 1982.

== Early life and education ==
Ackroyd was born on 15 September 1917 in Derby, Derbyshire, England. His family later moved to Harrow, Middlesex, and he was educated at Harrow County School for Boys, the local state school. In 1935, he matriculated into Downing College, Cambridge, to study modern and medieval languages. He graduated from the University of Cambridge with a Bachelor of Arts (BA) degree in 1938.

Ackroyd then joined the University of London to study theology, graduating with a Bachelor of Divinity (BD) degree in 1940 and a Master of Theology (MTh) degree in 1942. He was a Dr Williams's Trust Exhibitioner (1941) and a Stanton Student (1941 to 1943) at Trinity College, Cambridge, during this time, and thereby maintaining his links with Cambridge. He was awarded Master of Arts status (MA Cantab) by Trinity College in 1942. He then undertook postgraduate research at the University of Cambridge, completing his Doctor of Philosophy (PhD) degree in 1945. His doctoral thesis concerned the "criteria for the Maccabean dating of psalms", and was titled "The problem of Maccabean psalms, with special reference to the psalms of Solomon".

== Career ==
=== Ordained ministry ===
Ackroyd's father, Jabez Robert Ackroyd, had been a Congregational minister, and the family was brought up in that tradition. Ackroyd himself was ordained as a Congregational minister in 1940. He ministered at Roydon Congregational Church, Essex, from 1943 to 1947, and at Balham Congregational Church, London, from 1947 to 1948.

In the 1950s, Ackroyd was increasingly attracted to Anglicanism. He spent a period of time in 1957 training for Holy Orders at Westcott House, Cambridge, a Liberal Catholic theological college. This led to him being ordained in the Church of England as a deacon in 1957 and as a priest in 1958. From 1957 to 1961, he served his curacy at Holy Trinity Church, Cambridge, in the Diocese of Ely as an honorary curate. This was his only parish appointment: his subsequent career focused on his academic work. He was a Select Preacher at the University of Cambridge in 1958, and at the University of Oxford in 1962 and 1981. He was an elected representative for Cambridge in the Convocation of Canterbury from 1960 to 1964.

=== Academic career ===
In 1948, Ackroyd joined the University of Leeds as a lecturer in the Old Testament and Biblical Hebrew; he had to leave his church ministry to take up this post. In 1952, he moved to the University of Cambridge where he had been appointed a university lecturer in divinity. He served as a member of the Council of the Senate from 1957 to 1961.

In 1961, Ackroyd was elected as the next Samuel Davidson Professor of Old Testament Studies at the University of London. He was additionally Dean of the Faculty of Theology at King's College, London, from 1968 to 1969), and Dean of the University Faculty of Theology from 1976 to 1980. He was a Member of the Senate of the University of London between 1971 and 1979. He retired from full-time academia in 1982 and was appointed emeritus professor.

Outside of his full-time university posts, Ackroyd held a number of visiting professorships and learned society appointments. He was a visiting professor at the Lutheran School of Theology at Chicago in 1967 and 1976, at the University of Toronto in 1972, at the University of Notre Dame, Indiana in 1982, and at Emory University, Atlanta in 1984. He was President of the Society for Old Testament Study in 1972 and its Foreign Secretary between 1986 and 1989. He served as Chairman of the Council of the British School of Archaeology in Jerusalem from 1979 to 1983. He was Honorary Secretary of the Palestine Exploration Fund from 1962 to 1970, and served as its chairman from 1986 to 1990.

==== Research ====
Ackroyd's research focused on the Old Testament. He was involved in exegesis and wrote a number of commentaries on books of the Old Testament. He also researched biblical theology, and had an interest in history of the Bible and of the Second Temple period. He had an additional interest in Near Eastern archaeology, though he was not an expert in the field.

== Later life ==
Ackroyd died on 23 January 2005, aged 87. He had been living at the Littleport Grange nursing home in Littleport, Cambridgeshire, England.

== Personal life ==
On 25 July 1940, Ackroyd married Evelyn Alice Nutt, a school teacher. Together they had five children: two sons and three daughters. His first wife predeceased him, dying in 1990. On 7 September 1991, he married Ann Golden.

== Honours ==
Ackroyd was selected to give the Hulsean Lectures to the University of Cambridge for 1960. He was made a Fellow of King's College London (FKC) in 1969; this is the highest award of King's College London. He was awarded a Doctor of Divinity (DD) degree by the University of London in 1970. He was awarded an honorary DD by the University of St Andrews in 1970.

== Selected works ==
=== Books ===
- Ackroyd, Peter R. (1951). Freedom in action: Studies in the Acts of the Apostles. London: Independent Press. OCLC 751448396.
- ——— (1959). The People of the Old Testament. London: Chatto & Windus. ISBN 978-0701000011.
- ——— (1968). Exile and restoration: a study of Hebrew thought of the sixth century B.C. London: SCM-Canterbury Press. ISBN 9780664223199. OCLC 448660.
- ——— (1970). Israel under Babylon and Persia. Oxford: Oxford University Press. ISBN 9780198369073.
- ——— (1973). I & II Chronicles, Ezra, Nehemiah: introduction and commentary. Torch Bible commentaries. London: SCM Press. ISBN 9780334002338. OCLC 754863.
- ——— (1977). The Second Book of Samuel. Cambridge Bible Commentaries on the Old Testament. Cambridge: Cambridge University Press. ISBN 9780521086332. OCLC 153506.
- ——— (1987). Studies in the religious tradition of the Old Testament. London: SCM Press. ISBN 978-0334015604.
- ——— (1990). The Chronicler in his age. Journal for the study of the Old Testament, Supplement series. Vol. 107. Sheffield: Sheffield Academic Press. ISBN 9781850752547. OCLC 59886040.

=== Edited by ===
- ———; Lindars, Barnabas, eds. (1968). Words and meanings: essays presented to David Winton Thomas on his retirement from the Regius Professorship of Hebrew in the University of Cambridge, 1968. Cambridge: Cambridge University Press. ISBN 9780521072700. OCLC 260142.
- ———; Evans, C. F., eds. (1970). The Cambridge History of the Bible: Volume 1, From the Beginnings to Jerome. Cambridge: Cambridge University Press. ISBN 9780521074186.
- ———, ed. (1971). The First Book of Samuel (Cambridge Bible Commentaries on the Old Testament). Cambridge: Cambridge University Press. ISBN 978-0521079655.

=== Articles and chapters ===
- ——— (1968). "Meaning and exegesis". In ———; Lindars, Barnabas (eds.). Words and meanings: essays presented to David Winton Thomas on his retirement from the Regius Professorship of Hebrew in the University of Cambridge, 1968. Cambridge: Cambridge University Press. pp. 1–14. ISBN 9780521072700. OCLC 260142.

== Feschriften ==
- Coggins, Richard J.; Phillips, Anthony; Knibb, Michael A., eds. (1982). Israel's Prophetic Tradition: essays in honour of Peter R. Ackroyd. Cambridge, UK & New York: Cambridge University Press. ISBN 9780521242233. OCLC 7875599.
- Knoppers, Gary N.; Grabbe, Lester L.; Fulton, Deirdre N., eds. (2009). Exile and Restoration Revisited: essays on the Babylonian and Persian periods in memory of Peter R. Ackroyd. Library of Second Temple studies. Vol. 73. London: T & T Clark. ISBN 9780567465672. OCLC 676697101.
