= Won W. Lee =

Academic background
- Education: Yonsei University; Princeton Theological Seminary; Claremont Graduate School

Academic work
- Discipline: religion Asian studies
- Institutions: Calvin University
- Main interests: Book of Numbers
- Notable works: The Bible: A Library of Holy Writings

Won W. Lee is a professor of religion and Asian studies and department chair at Calvin University in Grand Rapids, Michigan.

== Life ==
Lee holds a BA from Yonsei University, Korea, a M.Div from the Princeton Theological Seminary, and from 1998 a PhD from the Claremont Graduate School. He is a member of Society of Biblical Literature, The Society for Old Testament Study and Korean Biblical Colloquium.

== Contributions ==
W. W. Lee deepen a study in the book of Numbers. According to Bruce Wells, "Lee argues that in the book of Numbers, the passage 10:11-36:16 constitutes an unified and coherent literary unit." Christian Frevel calls the study of W. W. Lee as "the famous compositional analysis." Mark J. Boda affirm that this "kind of dissertation that makes a splendid book, with its sustained argumentation, focus on interpretation of a large portion o text in the biblical corpus, and limited (but careful) review of past scholarship."

== Works ==
- Won W. Lee (2003). Punishment and Forgiveness in Israel's Migratory Campaign: The Macrostructure of Numbers 10:11-36:13. Grand Rapids, Mich.: W.B. Eerdmans Pub. Co. ISBN 9780802809926. OCLC 52838932.
- The Bible: A Library of Holy Writings. Seoul, Korea: Sallim. 2005.
- Thomas Römer, ed. (2008). "The Conceptual Coherence in Numbers 5,1-10,10". The Books of Leviticus and Numbers. Leuven: Peeters: Bibliotheca Ephemeridum Theologicarum Lovaniensium CCXV. pp. 473–89.
- Kenneth E. Pomykala, ed. (2008). "The Concept of the Wilderness in the Pentateuch". Israel in the Wilderness: Interpretations of the Biblical Narratives in Jewish and Christian Traditions. Leiden, Boston: Brill. pp. 1–16.
- Won W. Lee (2012). 圣经探秘 [Exploring the mysteries of the Bible]. Grand Raplds, Michigan: The Calvin College Press. ISBN 9781937555054. OCLC 970373744.
- Steven L. McKenzie, ed. (2013). "Korean Biblical Interpretation". The Oxford Encyclopedia of Biblical Interpretation. Vol. 1. Oxford University Press. pp. 473–82.
- "Numbers". The CEB Bible Study with Apocrypha. Nashville; Abingdon. 2013. pp. 201–58.
- Paolo Mollo; Won W. Lee (2015). An intratextual analysis of the mirroring birth stories of Samson and Samuel explaining the narrative logic of literary montage. Lewiston, New York The Edwin Mellen Press. ISBN 9781495503993. OCLC 1075037061.
