= Samuel Davidson Professor of Old Testament Studies =

Old Testament Studies at King's College, London

The Samuel Davidson Professorship of Old Testament Studies is a chair in Old Testament studies at King's College, London (formerly of the University of London). It was established in 1925 and is named after the Irish Biblical scholar Samuel Davidson.

== List of Samuel Davidson Professors ==
- 1926 to 1929: George Herbert Box; first incumbent
- 1930 to 1945: S. H. Hooke
- 1945 to 1947: Alfred Guillaume
- 1948 to 1960: W. D. McHardy
- 1961 to 1982: Peter Ackroyd
- 1983 to 1992: Ronald Clements; first incumbent to be based at King's College London
- 1992 to 1997: vacant
- 1997 to 2001: Michael A. Knibb
- 2001 to 2012: vacant
- 2012 to present: Paul Joyce
