= Leonard Elliott Elliott-Binns =

Canon Leonard Elliott Elliott-Binns (born Leonard Elliott Binns) (18 September 1885–1963) was an English historian and theologian, whose works covered a broad range of topics in English and Western church history, as well as the history of the Biblical era.

Born at Manchester, he was educated at Manchester Grammar School and Emmanuel College, Cambridge.

Elliott-Binns was ordained into the Church of England in 1913, serving as chaplain of Ridley Hall for two years before going into parish work. He was a curate in Plymouth, a vicar in Plymouth, Davenport, and West Ham, and a canon of Truro. Most of his life as a parish priest was spent in the West Country. In 1958 he served as the president of the Society for Old Testament Study.

He died at Northampton in 1963, aged 77.

== Selected works ==
- The Decline and Fall of the Medieval Papacy (1995) (ISBN 1-56619-849-6, ISBN 978-1-56619-849-3)
- The Development of English Theology in the Later Nineteenth Century (1952)
- English Thought 1860 -1900 (1956)
- The Evangelical Movement In The English Church (1928)
- Religion in the Victorian Era
- The Beginnings of Western Christendom
- From Moses to Elisha: Israel to the End of the Ninth Century BC
- The story of England's Church
- Innocent III
- Medieval Cornwall. Published by Methuen & Co, London
- Galilean Christianity (Studies in Biblical theology n°16) (1956)
- The book of Numbers: With introduction and notes
- The Church of St. Andrew, Plymouth: a short historical & descriptive guide
- Erasmus the reformer: A study in restatement; being the Hulsean lectures delivered before the University of Cambridge for 1921-1922
- The Book of Exodus (1924) (as L. Elliott Binns)
