= George J. Brooke =

English Biblical scholar (born 1952)

- Born: George John Brooke; 27 April 1952 (age 74); Chichester, West Sussex, England
- Occupations: Academic; author; biblical scholar; historian
- Years active: 1978–present

Academic background
- Education: St Peter's College, Oxford (BA); St John's College, Cambridge (PCGE); Claremont Graduate University (PhD)

Academic work
- Institutions: Salisbury and Wells Theological College (1978–1984); University of Manchester (1984–present)
- Notable works: Exegesis at Qumran (1983); The Complete World of the Dead Sea Scrolls (2002); The Dead Sea Scrolls and the New Testament (2005); Reading the Dead Sea Scrolls: Essays in Method (2013)

George John Brooke (born 27 April 1952) is an English academic, author, biblical scholar, and historian who served as Rylands Professor of Biblical Criticism and Exegesis at the University of Manchester from 1997 to 2016. He is also known for writing the books Exegesis at Qumran (1983), The Complete World of the Dead Sea Scrolls (2002), The Dead Sea Scrolls and the New Testament (2005), and Reading the Dead Sea Scrolls: Essays in Method (2013).

== Early life ==
George John Brooke was born in Chichester, West Sussex, England, on 27 April 1952. He attended secondary school as an exhibitioner at Wellington College (1965–1970). He studied theology at St Peter's College, Oxford (1970–1973); he was awarded a B.A. in 1973 and was awarded both the Junior and Senior Pusey and Ellington Prizes for Biblical Hebrew.

After a year at St John's College, Cambridge (1973–1974), where he completed the PGCE, he was awarded a Fulbright scholarship to study for a doctorate at Claremont Graduate School (now Claremont Graduate University), Claremont, California. He completed his Ph.D. studies in 1977 and graduated in 1978. For 1977-1978 he was Junior Fellow at the Oxford Centre for Postgraduate Hebrew Studies.

== Career ==
From 1978 to 1984 he taught the New Testament at Salisbury and Wells Theological College, Salisbury, England, where he also acted as examining chaplain to the Bishop of Salisbury. He was Vice-Principal of the college from 1982 to 1984.

In 1984 he was appointed as a lecturer in Intertestamental Literature at The University of Manchester, being promoted to Senior Lecturer in 1994, and to Professor of Biblical Studies in 1997. In 1998 he became the seventh Rylands Professor of Biblical Criticism and Exegesis, a post he held until the end of January 2016. He is now Rylands Professor of Biblical Criticism and Exegesis Emeritus. He was awarded the D.D. (doctor of divinity) by Oxford University in 2010. He was given an honorary doctorate (Docteur és Sciences des Religions) by the University of Lausanne in 2018. He was awarded the 2024 Burkitt Medal for Biblical Studies by the British Academy.

Since 2015 he has been an Honorary Visiting professor of Biblical Studies at the University of Chester and since 2024 an External Member of the University of Sheffield Centre for Interdisciplinary Biblical Studies. During his career he has held various visiting appointments. In 1983 (March–May) he was a Research Scholar at the Ecumenical Institute for Advanced Theological Studies, Tantur, Jerusalem, Israel. In 1992 (August–December), he was a Senior Research Fellow at the Annenberg Institute, Philadelphia, Pennsylvania, USA. In 2018 (February–May) he was the Dirk Smilde Fellow at the Qumran Institute in the Faculty of Religion, Culture and Society, University of Groningen, The Netherlands. In 2018 (November–December) he was a visiting professor in the Faculté de Théologie et Sciences des Religions at the Université de Lausanne, Switzerland. He delivered the Schweich Lectures at the British Academy in 2019.

He has been a member of several professional societies and held positions of responsibility in them. He was President of the British Association for Jewish Studies in 1999, President of the Society for Old Testament Study in 2012, and President of the European Association for Biblical Studies for 2021–2024. He was a member of the Steering Committee of the International Organization for Qumran Studies from 1989 until 2016.

He has participated in consultancy and research assessment, both in the UK and other countries. For 2011–2014 he was a member of HEFCE Research Excellence Framework Sub-Panel 33 for Theology and Religious Studies (REF 2014). For 2013 he was the representative of the Church of England Ministry Division and Archbishops’ Council at the University of Durham Validation Process for Theological Colleges and Courses (known as the Durham Awards Scheme). For 2017–2022 he was a member and then chair of the International Committee on Scientific and Strategic Orientation (COSS), Collège de France, Paris.

He has been on several editorial boards. In 1993 he was a founding editor of the journal Dead Sea Discoveries (Leiden: Brill). Since 1998 he has been on the editorial board of Revue de Qumrân (Leuven: Peeters). From 1991 to 2019 he was an editor of the Journal of Semitic Studies (Oxford: Oxford University Press). Since 2012 he has been the Senior Editor of the leading monograph series for the publication of scholarship on the Dead Sea Scrolls, Studies on the Texts of the Desert of Judah (Leiden: Brill).

His research has had its focus on the Dead Sea Scrolls. He has published widely on the use of the Jewish scriptures in the Scrolls, on the scriptural manuscripts themselves, on the materiality of the Scrolls, on the relationships between the Scrolls and the New Testament, and on the application of modern methodologies to the study of the Scrolls. He was a member of the Israel Antiquities Authority team of editors of the unpublished Dead Sea Scrolls from 1992 to 1998. He has supervised more than thirty doctoral and postdoctoral students, seventeen of whom have published their revised theses as monographs.

== Principal publications ==
(a) Authored and co-authored books

The Dead Sea Scrolls and German Scholarship: Thoughts of an Englishman Abroad (Julius Wellhausen Vorlesung 6; Berlin: de Gruyter, 2018), xi + 32 pp. (ISBN 978-3-11-059585-7; epub 978-3-11-059364-8)

Reading the Dead Sea Scrolls: Essays in Method (SBL Early Judaism and its Literature 39; Atlanta, GA: SBL, 2013), xxii + 286 (ISBN 978-1-58983-901-4 pbk; 978-1-58983-902-1 ebook; 978-1-58983-903-8 hbk)

The Dead Sea Scrolls and the New Testament: Essays in Mutual Illumination (London: SPCK, 2005), xxii + 314 pp. (ISBN 978-0-281-05710-8 Pbk); US edition: The Dead Sea Scrolls and the New Testament (Minneapolis, MN: Fortress Press, 2005) (ISBN 978-0-8006-3723-1 Hbk; 0-8006-3724-0 Pbk)

Qumran and the Jewish Jesus: Reading the New Testament in the Light of the Scrolls (Grove Biblical Series 35; Cambridge: Grove Books, 2005), 28 pp. (ISBN 978-1-85174-587-6)

The Complete World of the Dead Sea Scrolls with Philip R. Davies and Phillip R. Callaway (London: Thames and Hudson, 2002), 216 pp. + 216 illustrations (84 in colour) (ISBN 978-0-500-05111-5); German edition: Qumran: Die Schriftrollen vom Toten Meer (trans. T. Bertram; Stuttgart: Theiss and Wissenschaftliche Buchgesellschaft, 2002) (ISBN 978-3-8062-1713-1); Spanish edition: Los Rollos del Mar Muerto y su mundo (trans. A. Guzmán Guerra; Madrid: Alianza Editorial, 2002) (ISBN 978-84-206-8630-1); Dutch edition: De Wereld de Dode Zeerollen (trans. A. van der Kooij; Abcoude: Fontaine Uitgevers, 2003) (ISBN 978-90-5956-019-2); Hungarian edition: A holt-tengeri tekercsek világa (trans. S. Róbert; Pécs: Alexandra Kiadója, 2003) (ISBN 978-963-368-483-2); Japanese edition: Shikai Bunsho Daihyakka (trans. Y. Ikeda; Tokyo: Toyo Shorin, 2003) (ISBN 978-4-88721-634-1). Revised edition in paperback, 2011 (ISBN 978-0-500-28371-4).

Isaiah at Qumran: Updating W.H. Brownlee’s The Meaning of the Qumrân Scrolls for the Bible (Occasional Papers No. 46; Claremont: Institute for Antiquity and Christianity, 2004), 20 pp. (available at http://ccdl.libraries.claremont.edu/)

The Allegro Qumran Collection: Introduction and Catalogue; Microfiches in collaboration with Helen K. Bond (Leiden: Brill/IDC, 1996), 51 pp. + 30 microfiches. (ISBN 978-90-04-10558-4)

A Further Fragment of 1QSb: The Schøyen Collection MS 1909 with J.M. Robinson (Occasional Papers No. 30; Claremont: Institute for Antiquity and Christianity, 1994), 19 pp., 2 plates (available at http://ccdl.libraries.claremont.edu/)

Exegesis at Qumran: 4QFlorilegium in its Jewish Context (Journal for the Study of the Old Testament Supplement Series 29; Sheffield: JSOT Press, 1985), xii + 390 pp. (ISBN 978-0-905774-76-3 Hbk; 0-905774-77-9 Pbk). Reprinted: Atlanta, GA: Society of Biblical Literature, 2006 (ISBN 978-1-58983-237-4)

(b) Edited and co-edited books

Missing Pieces: Essays in Honour of Eibert J.C. Tigchelaar, Editor with Arjen Bakker, Bärry Hartog, Hindy Najman, Mladen Popović, and Pierre Van Hecke (Studies on the Texts of the Desert of Judah 152; Leiden: Brill, 2025), xxxviii + 631 pp., 39 figures, 30 tables (ISSN 0169-9962; ISBN 978-90-04-72729-8; eISBN 978-90-04-72730-4)

Materiality and Textuality in the Dead Sea Scrolls: Essays in Honour of Eibert J.C. Tigchelaar, Editor with Hindy Najman (Leiden: Brill, 2023), 142 pp. Special theme issue of Dead Sea Discoveries 30/3 (2023) (ISSN 0929-0761 [print]; 1568-5179 [online])

T&T Clark Companion to the Dead Sea Scrolls, Editor with Charlotte Hempel (London: T&T Clark, 2019), xiv + 657 pp., 14 illustrations (ISBN 978-0-567-35205-7; ePDF 978-0-5675-9022-0; eISBN 978-0-567-68474-5). Reprinted in paperback 2025.

Near Eastern and Arabian Essays: Studies in Honour of John F. Healey, Editor with Adrian H.W. Curtis, M. Al-Hamad, and G. Rex Smith (JSS Supplement 41; Oxford: Oxford University Press, 2018), xx + 313 pp. (ISBN 978-0-19-883106-8)

Hā-îsh Mōshe: Studies in Scriptural Interpretation in the Dead Sea Scrolls and Related Literature in Honor of Moshe J. Bernstein, Editor with B. Goldstein and Michael Segal (Studies on the Texts of the Desert of Judah 122; Leiden: Brill, 2017), xix + 399 pp. (ISBN 987-90-04-35468-5; eISBN 978-90-04-35572-9)

Jewish Education from Antiquity to the Middle Ages: Studies in Honour of Philip S. Alexander, Editor with Renate Smithuis (Ancient Judaism and Early Christianity 100; Leiden: Brill, 2017), x + 461 pp. (ISBN 987-90-04-34775-5; eISBN 978-90-04-34776-2)

Goochem in Mokum—Wisdom in Amsterdam: Papers on Biblical and Related Wisdom Read at the Fifteenth Joint Meeting of the Society for Old Testament Study and the Oudtestamentisch Werkgezelschap, Amsterdam, July 2012, Editor with Pierre Van Hecke and with the assistance of Bob Becking and Eibert J.C. Tigchelaar (Oudtestamentische Studiën 68; Leiden: Brill, 2016), viii + 182 pp. (ISBN 978-90-04-31476-4)

On Prophets, Warriors, and Kings: Former Prophets Through the Eyes of Their Interpreters Editor with Ariel Feldman (Beihefte zur Zeitschrift für die alttestamentliche Wissenschaft 470; Berlin: de Gruyter, 2016), vi + 268 pp. (ISBN 978-3-11-037738-5)

The Scrolls and Biblical Traditions: Proceedings of the Seventh Meeting of the IOQS in Helsinki, Editor with Daniel K. Falk, Eibert J.C. Tigchelaar and Molly M. Zahn (Studies on the Texts of the Desert of Judah 103; Leiden: Brill, 2012), viii + 275 pp. (ISBN 978-90-04-23104-7)

The Mermaid and the Partridge: Essays from the Copenhagen Conference on Revising Texts from Cave Four, Editor with Jesper Høgenhaven (Studies on the Texts of the Desert of Judah 96; Leiden: Brill, 2011), ix + 309 pp. (ISBN 978-90-04-19430-4).

The Significance of Sinai: Traditions about Divine Revelation in Judaism and Christianity, Editor with Hindy Najman and Loren T. Stuckenbruck (Themes in Biblical Narrative 12; Leiden: Brill, 2008), xiv + 386 pp. (ISBN 978-90-04-17018-6)

Ancient and Modern Scriptural Historiography–L’Historiographie biblique, ancienne et moderne, Editor with Thomas Römer (Bibliotheca Ephemeridum Theologicarum Lovaniensium 207; Leuven: Peeters/University Press, 2007), xxxvii + 371 pp. (ISBN 978-90-5867-634-4 [University Press]; 978-90-429-1969-3 [Peeters])

Society for Old Testament Study Book List 2006, Editor (London: Sage Publications, 2006), vi + 225 pp. (ISBN 978-1-4129-3027-7)

Society for Old Testament Study Book List 2005, Editor with the assistance of Anna Turton (London: Sage Publications, 2005), vi + 237 pp. (ISBN 978-1-4129-1867-1)

Studia Semitica: The Journal of Semitic Studies Jubilee Volume, Editor with Philip S. Alexander, Andreas Christmann, John F. Healey, and Philip C. Sadgrove (Journal of Semitic Studies Supplement 16; Oxford: Oxford University Press on behalf of the University of Manchester, 2005), vii + 303 pp. (ISBN 978-0-19-857092-9)

Society for Old Testament Study Book List 2004, Editor with the assistance of Anna Turton (London: T & T Clark International, 2004), vi + 260 pp. (ISBN 978-0-8264-7798-9)

Society for Old Testament Study Book List 2003, Editor with the assistance of Simon G. Adnams (London: Sheffield Academic Press, 2003), vi + 222 pp. (ISBN 978-0-8264-6668-6)

Society for Old Testament Study Book List 2002, Editor with the assistance of Julie A. Hughes (London: Sheffield Academic Press, 2002), vi + 271 pp. (ISBN 978-1-84127-294-8)

Copper Scroll Studies, Editor with Philip R. Davies (Journal for the Study of the Pseudepigrapha Supplement Series 40; London: Sheffield Academic Press, 2002), xvi + 344 pp.; reprinted in paperback (London: T & T Clark International, 2004) (ISBN 978-0-8264-6055-4 Hbk; 0-5670-8456-6 Pbk)

Society for Old Testament Study Book List 2001, Editor with the assistance of Julie A. Hughes (Sheffield: Sheffield Academic Press, 2001), 190 pp. (ISBN 978-1-84127-206-1)

Narrativity in Biblical and Related Texts/La Narrativité dans la Bible et les textes apparentés, Editor with Jean-Daniel Kaestli (Bibliotheca Ephemeridum Theologicarum Lovaniensium 149; Leuven: Peeters/University Press, 2000), xxi + 307 pp. (ISBN 978-90-5867-068-7 [University Press]; 90-429-0877-7 [Peeters])

Jewish Ways of Reading the Bible, Editor (Journal of Semitic Studies Supplement 11; Oxford: Oxford University Press on behalf of the University of Manchester, 2000), vi + 326 pp., 2 plates. (ISBN 978-0-19-850918-9)

The Birth of Jesus: Biblical and Theological Reflections, Editor (Edinburgh: T & T Clark, 2000), xiii + 141 pp. Published with the aid of a grant from the University of Manchester Research Support Fund. (ISBN 978-0-567-08756-0)

Encyclopedia of the Dead Sea Scrolls, Area Editor (ed. Lawrence H. Schiffman and James C. VanderKam; New York: Oxford University Press, 2000), xiv + 1132 pp. in 2 volumes. (ISBN 978-0-19-508450-4 set; 0-19-513796-5 vol. 1; 0-19-513797-3 vol. 2)

Ugarit and the Bible: Proceedings of the International Symposium on Ugarit and the Bible, Manchester, September 1992, Editor with Adrian H.W. Curtis and John F. Healey (Ugaritisch–Biblische Literatur 11; Münster: Ugarit-Verlag, 1994), x + 470 pp. (ISBN 978-3-927120-22-8)

New Qumran Texts and Studies: Proceedings of the First Meeting of the International Organization for Qumran Studies, Paris 1992, Editor with the assistance of Florentino García Martínez (Studies on the Texts of the Desert of Judah 15; Leiden: Brill, 1994), xx + 328 pp., 9 plates. (ISBN 978-90-04-10093-0)

Women in the Biblical Tradition, Editor (Studies in Women and Religion 31; Lewiston, Queenston, Lampeter: Edwin Mellen Press, 1992), ix + 297 pp. (ISBN 978-0-7734-9216-5)

Septuagint, Scrolls and Cognate Writings: Papers Presented to the International Symposium on the Septuagint and Its Relations to the Dead Sea Scrolls and Other Writings (Manchester, 1990), Editor with Barnabas Lindars (Society of Biblical Literature Septuagint and Cognate Studies Series 33; Atlanta: Scholars Press, 1992), viii + 657 pp. (ISBN 978-1-55540-707-0)

Temple Scroll Studies: Papers Presented at the International Symposium on the Temple Scroll (Manchester, December 1987), Editor (Journal for the Study of the Pseudepigrapha Supplement Series 7; Sheffield: JSOT Press, 1989), 299 pp. (ISBN 978-1-85075-200-4)
