= C. T. R. Hayward =

Charles Thomas Robert Hayward

Academic background
- Education: Durham University; Oxford University

Charles Thomas Robert Hayward (born 1948) is a British academic and convicted sex offender. He had been Professor of Hebrew in the Department of Theology and Religion at Durham University.

== Academic career ==
After receiving a BA (Theology, University of Durham, 1971), MA (Theology, University of Durham, 1973) and DPhil (University of Oxford, 1975) he lectured at Lancaster University (1977–1979). He returned to Durham being appointed Lecturer in Theology (1979), Senior Lecturer (1989) and Reader (1994).

In 2006, Hayward was elected President of the Society for Old Testament Studies. He was President in 2003 of the British Association for Jewish Studies.

=== Books ===
- Divine name and presence: The Memra (Totowa, N.J.:Allenheld Osmun, 1981)
- The Targum of Jeremiah. Translated, with a Critical Introduction, Apparatus and Notes (The Aramaic Bible, 12: Wilmington, Del.: Michael Glazier, 1987)
- Jerome's Hebrew Questions on Genesis: Translated with an Introduction and Commentary (Oxford, Oxford University Press, 1995)
- The Jewish Temple: A Non-Biblical Sourcebook (London: Routledge, 1996)
- Pauline Allen and C.T.R. Hayward, Severus of Antioch (London:Routledge, 2004)
- Interpretations of the Name Israel in Ancient Judaism and Some Early Christian Writings (Oxford: Oxford University Press, 2005)
- Targums and the Transmission of Scripture into Judaism and Christianity (Leiden: Brill, 2010)

== 2016 conviction ==
In 2016 he was convicted of child pornography charges at Durham Crown Court, sentenced to a two-year community supervision order and was made subject to a sexual harm prevention order and registered as a sex offender, both for five years.
