= Journal of Semitic Studies =

- Discipline: Area studies
- Language: English

Publication details
- History: 1955-present
- Publisher: Oxford University Press (Great Britain)
- Frequency: Biannually

Standard abbreviations
- ISO 4: J. Semit. Stud.

Indexing
- CODEN: JSSTF5
- ISSN: 0022-4480 (print); 1477-8556 (web)
- OCLC no.: 29943768

Links
- Journal homepage; Online access; Online archive

The Journal of Semitic Studies is a biannual peer-reviewed academic journal that was established in 1955. It covers research of the modern as well as the ancient Near East, with a special focus on Semitic languages and the corresponding literatures. The editorial committee currently consists of P. S. Alexander, G.J. Brooke, R. Buckley, D. C. Eades, J. F. Healey, P. C. Sadgrove, and R. Smithuis.

== History ==
H. H. Rowley was notably the editor of the Journal of Semitic Studies from 1956 to 1960 along with Pinkas Rudolf Weis. The role was picked up after Rowley's death by Joseph E. Lowry as editor from 1961.

== Supplement ==
From 1993 to date the Society publishes a Supplement series of books. The rationale is to give scope for larger treatments of subject than is possible in the context of a journal.
