= John Clark Love Gibson =

John Clark Love Gibson or J. C. L. Gibson (28 May 1930 – 17 November 2008) was a Scottish biblical scholar, minister, and Professor of Hebrew and Old Testament Studies at the University of Edinburgh. He combined academic scholarship with pastoral ministry and popular biblical writing.

In 1994 he served as President of the Society for Old Testament Study.

== Life ==
Gibson was born in the manse of Whifflet, Coatbridge, on 28 May 1930. He studied at the University of Glasgow, graduating MA with First Class Honours in Semitic Languages in 1953 and BD with distinction in 1956. He pursued doctoral research at Oxford under the Hebraist Sir Godfrey Rolles Driver, completing a DPhil on the Hebrew language.

He served as minister of Newmachar, Aberdeen, for three years before beginning a long academic career at New College, Edinburgh. From 1962 to 1994 he taught there successively as lecturer in Hebrew and Semitic Languages, Reader (1973), and Professor (1987).

== Scholarship ==
In the 1970s he produced a three-volume Textbook of Syrian Semitic Inscriptions as an update and replacement for George Albert Cooke’s 1903 Textbook of North-Semitic Inscriptions. He also undertook a complete revision of Godfrey Driver's Canaanite Myths and Legends, publishing important new studies of second millennium BCE texts from Ugarit. In the 1990s he edited a fourth edition of Andrew B. Davidson’s classic Hebrew Syntax (1901).

Gibson's work extended beyond specialist philology. He contributed to the Daily Study Bible series as Old Testament counterpart to William Barclay's New Testament volumes, recruiting a team of scholars for the 22-volume project. He wrote volumes on Genesis and Job.

== Personal life ==
Gibson was married for over 50 years, and had four sons and one daughter. He died on 17 November 2008 in Edinburgh at the age of 78, following a long illness.

== Selected works ==
- Textbook of Syrian Semitic Inscriptions (3 vols., 1971–1982)
- Canaanite Myths and Legends, revised edition
- Hebrew Syntax, 4th edition (1990s)
- Daily Study Bible: Genesis (2 vols.) and Job
- Language and Imagery in the Old Testament
