= Legacy series =

Essay collection

The Legacy series of essay collections was produced by Oxford University Press, from the early 1920s. It was aimed at Workers' Educational Association and university extension courses, and was an initiative of John Johnson.

The more recent Appraisal volumes move away from general surveys, to include articles with a focus on the history of relevant literary topics.

Title	Year	Editor	Comment
The Legacy of Greece	1921	Richard Winn Livingstone	Followed by The Pageant of Greece and The Mission of Greece, both also edited by Livingstone.
The Legacy of Rome	1923	Cyril Bailey	
The Legacy of the Middle Ages	1926	Charles George Crump; Ernest Fraser Jacob	
The Legacy of Israel	1927	Edwyn Bevan; Charles Joseph Singer	
The Legacy of Islam	1931	Thomas Walker Arnold; Alfred Guillaume	2nd edition 1974, edited by Joseph Schacht and Clifford Edmund Bosworth
The Legacy of India	1942	Geoffrey Theodore Garratt	Authors: Hugh George Rawlinson, Frederick William Thomas
The Legacy of Egypt	1942	Stephen Ranulph Kingdon Glanville	2nd edition 1972, edited by J. R. Harris
The Legacy of Persia	1953	Arthur John Arberry	
The Legacy of China	1964	Raymond Dawson	
The Legacy of Greece: A New Appraisal	1981	Moses Finley	
The Legacy of Rome: A New Appraisal	1983	Richard Jenkyns	
The Legacy of Mesopotamia	1998	Stephanie Dalley	
