= Arthur Peake =

English biblical scholar (1865–1929)

Arthur Samuel Peake (1865–1929) was an English biblical scholar, born at Leek, Staffordshire, and educated at St John's College, Oxford. He was the first holder of the Rylands Chair of Biblical Criticism and Exegesis in the University of Manchester, from its establishment as an independent institution in 1904. He was thus the first non-Anglican to become a professor of divinity in an English university.

Peake popularized modern biblical scholarship, including the new "higher criticism." He approached the Bible not as the infallible word of God, but as the record of revelation written by fallible humans.

== Early life ==
Arthur Peake was born in Leek on 24 November 1865 into a family of long-established Primitive Methodists, of which his father was a minister. He had four brothers and two sisters. The family moved several times during Arthur's childhood, with longest stays at Leintwardine, from where Arthur attended Ludlow Grammar School, Stratford, where he studied at King Edward VI School in Stratford-upon-Avon, and King Henry VIII School, Coventry. There he won a classical scholarship to study at St John's College, Oxford.

Arriving in Oxford in 1883, he studied the classics without great success for two years, but then switched to the study of theology, in which he excelled, winning a first-class degree and a further scholarship. Although he formed at this time an intention to seek ordination in the Church of England, he was never ordained, remaining a Methodist layman for the rest of his life.

== Academic career ==
In 1890-92 he was a lecturer at Mansfield College, Oxford, and from 1890 to 1897 held a fellowship at Merton College.

In 1892, however, he was invited to become tutor at the Primitive Methodist Theological Institute in Manchester, which was renamed Hartley College in 1906. He was largely responsible for broadening the curriculum which intending Primitive Methodist ministers were required to follow, and for raising the standards of the training.

In 1895-1912 he served as lecturer in the Lancashire Independent College, from 1904 to 1912 also in the United Methodist College at Manchester. In 1904 he was appointed Professor of Biblical Criticism and Exegesis in the (Victoria) University of Manchester. (This chair was in the Faculty of Theology established in that year; it was renamed "Rylands Professor, etc." in 1909.)

Peake was also active as a layman in wider Methodist circles, and did a great deal to further the reunion of Methodism which took effect in 1932, three years after his death. In the wider ecumenical sphere Peake worked for the National Council of Evangelical Free Churches, serving as president in 1928, and was a member of the World Conference on Faith and Order held in Lausanne in 1927. He published and lectured extensively, but is best remembered for his one-volume commentary on the Bible (1919), which, in its revised form, is still in use.

The University of Aberdeen made him an honorary D. D. in 1907. He was a governor of the John Rylands Library. In 1924 he was president of the Society for Old Testament Study.

== Personal life ==
Peake married Harriet Mary Sillman (of Oxford) on 29 June 1892: their three sons were Leslie Sillman Peake (b. 1900), Arnold Arthur Peake (b. 1903) and Clive Talbot Peake (b. 1905).

== Selected publications ==
Among Dr. Peake's publications are:

- A Guide to Biblical Study (1897)
- The Problem of Suffering in the Old Testament (1904)
- The Religion of Israel (1908)
- Critical Introduction to the New Testament (1909)
- Heroes and Martyrs of Faith (1910)
- The Bible: its Origin, its Significance, and its Abiding Worth (1913)
- Germany in the Nineteenth Century (1915)
- A Commentary on the Bible (with the assistance of A. J. Grieve for the New Testament) (1919)
- The Servant of Yahweh: lectures given at London and Manchester, 1904-26 (1931) (edited posthumously)

Dr. Peake also wrote separate commentaries on Hebrews (1902; Century Bible), Colossians (1903; Expositor's Greek Testament), Job (1905; Century Bible), Jeremiah (1910–12; Century Bible), and Isaiah xl-lxvi (1912). A portrait of him is at the John Rylands University Library, University of Manchester.
