= Weingreen Museum of Biblical Antiquities =

Museum at Trinity College, Dublin

- Established: 1977
- Location: Arts and Social Sciences Building, Trinity College, Dublin
- Coordinates: 53.34326°N 6.25710°W
- Curator: Zuleika Rodgers (2016)
- Website: www.tcd.ie/Religions_Theology/weingreenmuseum

The Weingreen Museum of Biblical Antiquities is located in the Arts and Social Sciences Building, in Trinity College, Dublin. It received its present title in 1977 in recognition of Professor Jacob Weingreen's contribution to the creation of the museum. Professor Weingreen was Erasmus Smith's Professor of Hebrew at Trinity College Dublin between 1939 and 1979.

The museum consists mainly of pottery and other artefacts from the Ancient Near East. The nucleus of the museum's collection is constituted by artifacts from the excavations of four Biblical cities in Palestine, Israel, and Jordan: Lachish (Director: J.L. Starkey, 1932–1938), Jericho (Kathleen Kenyon 1952–1959), Jerusalem (Kathleen Kenyon, 1961–1967) and Buseirah (Crystal Bennett, 1971–1975). It holds over 2000 objects. It is curated by Zuleika Rodgers, and is available to view by appointment only, though it is being digitised for online viewing.
