= James Allen Hewett =

American biblical scholar

Academic background
- Education: University of Manchester
- Doctoral advisor: F. F. Bruce

Academic work
- Discipline: Biblical studies
- Institutions: Uganda Christian University; Oral Roberts University; Asbury Theological Seminary
- Main interests: Koine Greek
- Notable works: New Testament Greek: A Beginning and Intermediate Grammar

James Allen Hewett is an American professor of Koine Greek who has taught at Uganda Christian University, Oral Roberts University, and Asbury Theological Seminary. His book, New Testament Greek: A Beginning and Intermediate Grammar, is used as a university textbook.

== Life ==
Hewett was Pastor at the United Methodist Church, Chaquota, Oklahoma.

=== Education ===
Hewett holds a B.A., B.D., and a M.A. Hewett earned a PhD from the University of Manchester under the supervision of F. F. Bruce.

== Works ==
=== Theses ===
- Hewett, James Allen (1968). The Messiah of Israel and His Kingdom. A Study in Realized Eschatology (Wheaton College (Ill.)). OCLC 19230251.
- ————————— (1973). The Use of the H̲a̲g̲i̲o̲s̲ Group of Words for "Holiness" in the Pauline Corpus (Excluding the Pastoral Epistles) in the Light of Its Old Testament Background (dissertation). OCLC 7063348.

=== Books ===
As coauthor he wrote a grammar that introduces Greek grammatical concepts using comparisons to familiar English grammar. It explains each concept with examples from the New Testament and includes translation exercises based on passages from the biblical text. The material is intended for students studying Greek, including those engaged in translation, exegesis, and biblical interpretation.

- Hewett, James Allen; Robbins, C. Michael; Johnson, Steven R. (1986). New Testament Greek. A Beginning and Intermediate Grammar. Hendrickson Publishers. ISBN 9780913573327.
- ————————— (1987). Key to Exercises for New Testament Greek. A Beginning and Intermediate Grammar. Hendrickson Publishers. ISBN 9780913573839.
- —————————; Spurgeon, Charles Haddon (2008). Sermons on Men of the Bible. Hendrickson Pub. ISBN 9781598563023.

== Book reviews ==
- Dalrymple-Hamilton, Francis (2010-06-05). "Book review. New Testament Greek: A Beginning and Intermediate Grammar". Review of Biblical Literature. Society of Biblical Literature.
- Vance, Laurence (2010-01-19). "Book review. New Testament Greek: A Beginning and Intermediate Grammar". Review of Biblical Literature. Society of Biblical Literature.
- Smith, W. Andrew (2014-08-07). "Hewett James Allen, New Testament Greek: A Beginning and Intermediate Grammar (Peabody. Mass.: Hendrickson, 2009. £23.99. pp. 324 + CD, ISBN 978-1-59856-141-8)". The Expository Times. 125 (12). doi:10.1177/0014524614524144d.
- Pennington, Jonathan T. (2010). "James Allen Hewett. New Testament Greek: A Beginning and Intermediate Grammar, Revised Edition with CD. Revised and expanded by C. Michael Robbins and Steven R. Johnson. Peabody, MA: Hendrickson, 2009. xxiv + 326 pp. $34.95". Themelios. 35 (1): 83–85.
