= Rylands Professor of Biblical Criticism and Exegesis =

The Rylands Professor of Biblical Criticism and Exegesis is a professorship or chair in the Department of Religions and Theology at the University of Manchester, England. Formerly in the Faculty of Theology, the chair resides now in the School of Arts, Languages and Cultures. The chair was established in 1904 as one of two chairs endowed by Enriqueta Rylands in the former Faculty of Theology which was founded the same year. The current holder of the chair is Professor Peter Oakes, who was appointed in 2020.

== Former holders ==
Former holders:

- Arthur Peake, 1904–1929
- C. H. Dodd, 1930–1935
- Thomas Walter Manson, 1936–1958
- F. F. Bruce, 1959–1978
- Barnabas Lindars, 1978–1990
- Christopher M. Tuckett, 1991–1996
- George J. Brooke, 1997–2016
