= Thomas Walter Manson =

English biblical scholar

Thomas Walter Manson (July 22, 1893 – May 1, 1958), FBA was an English biblical scholar.

Born in North Shields on July 22, 1893, he was educated at Tynemouth Municipal High School and the University of Glasgow where he was awarded an M.A. In 1922 he entered Westminster College, Cambridge, for training as a minister of the Presbyterian Church of England, and concurrently Christ's College where he read for the Oriental Tripos. In 1925 he was ordained as a minister and after a period at the Jewish Mission Institute in Bethnal Green he became minister at Falstone Church, Northumberland, in 1926. In the same year he married Nora Wallace.

While at Falstone his first book, The Teaching of Jesus, was published. This book established him as a New Testament scholar. In 1932 he was appointed Yates Professor of New Testament Greek and Exegesis at Mansfield College, Oxford. His writings are mainly in the field of New Testament studies but his knowledge of Hebrew and several more oriental languages enabled him to contribute also to the study of the Septuagint, the Apocrypha and the pseudepigrapha. In 1936 he became Rylands Professor of Biblical Criticism and Exegesis at the Victoria University of Manchester. While there he was elected to the membership of Manchester Literary and Philosophical Society on 1 January 1945.

His major works are A Companion to the Bible (1939, as editor and contributor), The Church's Ministry (1948), Ministry and Priesthood, Christ's and Ours (1958), and Studies in the Gospels and Epistles (1962, posthumous).

== Legacy ==
He and his wife had no children. His papers are now in the John Rylands Library, Manchester. Part of them was passed to the library after Manson's death and another part after Mrs. Manson's death.

== Sources ==
- Shiel, Judith B. (1999) "The Papers of T. W. Manson"; in: Bulletin of the John Rylands University of Manchester; vol. 81, no. 2, pp. 51–165 (prefatory memoir, pp. 51–53)
