= S. H. Hooke =

English scholar

Samuel Henry Hooke (January 21, 1874 – January 17, 1968) was an English scholar writing on comparative religion. He is known for his Bible in Basic English translation.

He was born in Cirencester, Gloucestershire. He was educated at St. Mark's school, Windsor and Jesus College, Oxford.

From 1913 to 1926 he was Professor of Oriental Languages at the University of Toronto, where he was a founder of and contributor to Canadian Forum. In 1930 he was appointed Samuel Davidson Professor of Old Testament Studies at the University of London. In 1951, Hooke was president of the Society for Old Testament Study.

== Works ==
=== Author ===
- Christianity in the Making (1926)
- New Year's Day: The Story of the Calendar (1927)
- The Origins of Early Semitic Ritual (1938) (Schweich Lectures for 1935)
- In the Beginning (1947)
- What Is the Bible? (1948)
- The Kingdom of God in the Experience of Jesus (1949)
- Babylonian and Assyrian Religion (1953)
- The Siege Perilous: Essays in Biblical Anthropology and Kindred Subjects (1956)
- Alpha and Omega: A Study in the Pattern of Revelation (1961)
- Middle Eastern Mythology (1963)
- The Resurrection of Christ as History and Experience (1967)

=== Editor ===
- Myth and Ritual (1933)
- The Labyrinth: Further Studies in the Relation between Myth and Ritual in the Ancient World (1935)
- Myth, Ritual and Kingship (1958)

=== Translator ===
- Jesus by Charles Guignebert (1935)
- The Parables of Jesus by Joachim Jeremias (1954)
- The Prophets and the Rise of Judaism by Adolphe Lods (1955)
- Samaria the Capital of the Kingdom of Israel by André Parrot (1958)
- Bible in Basic English (BBE) (NT 1941, OT 1949, Revised 1965)
