= Michael A. Knibb =

English biblical scholar (1938–2023)

Michael Anthony Knibb FBA FKC (14 December 1938 – 6 December 2023) was an English biblical scholar and academic. He was Samuel Davidson Professor of Old Testament Studies at King's College London from 1997 to 2001.

Born 14 December 1938, he completed BD and PhD degrees at King's College. He was appointed lecturer in Old Testament studies there in 1964 and was promoted to a readership in 1982 and a professorship in 1986, which he held until being appointed to the Davidson chair in 1997. In 1989, he was elected a Fellow of the British Academy, the United Kingdom's national academy, and served on its council from 1992 to 1995. He was also elected a Fellow of King's College in 1991.

Knibb died on 6 December 2023, at the age of 84.

== Publications ==
- The Ethiopic Book of Enoch: A New Edition in the Light of the Aramaic Dead Sea Fragments, 2 vols. (Clarendon Press, 1978).
- Translating the Bible: The Ethiopic Version of the Old Testament (Oxford University Press, 1999) – Knibb's Schweich Lectures on Biblical Archaeology for the British Academy given in 1995.
- (Editor) The Septuagint and Messianism (Leuven University Press, 2006).
- Essays on the Book of Enoch and other early Jewish Texts and Traditions (Brill, 2009).
- The Ethiopic Text of the Book of Ezekiel: A Critical Edition (Oxford University Press, 2015).
