= H. H. Rowley =

English biblical scholar (1890–1969)

- Born: 24 March 1890; Leicester, England
- Died: 4 October 1969 (aged 79); Cheltenham, England
- Occupations: professor, theologian, scholar, author
- Spouse: Gladys B. Shaw
- Children: Son & three daughters

Academic background
- Education: BD & BA, Bristol Baptist College; B.Litt., Mansfield College, Oxford

Academic work
- Era: Mid 20th century
- Main interests: Old Testament studies, Semitic languages
- Notable works: The Faith of Israel (1956); Worship in Ancient Israel (1967)
- Notable ideas: That "election" in Scripture is primarily a corporate concept

Harold Henry Rowley (24 March 1890 – 4 October 1969) was an English Old Testament scholar from the Baptist tradition.

== Biography ==
H. H. Rowley was born in Leicester on 24 March 1890 to Richard Rowley and Emma (née Saunt) Rowley. The family Baptist church was Melbourne Hall, Leicester, previously led by F. B. Meyer and William F. Fullerton. These beginnings profoundly affected and formed Rowley's churchmanship, theology and missional interests. His childhood education was at Wyggeston School, Leicester. He studied at the Bristol Baptist College, gaining a B.D. (overseen by University College London) and B.A. and at Mansfield College, Oxford, earning a B.Litt.

Initially starting his career in 1916 as church minister at Wells, Somerset, he then became a missionary to China with the Baptist Missionary Society. His academic career started with a position in 1935 as Professor of Hebrew and Semitic Languages at University College, Bangor, serving from 1935 to 1945. He saw out his formal academic career with the chair of Semitic languages at Manchester University, eventually retiring in 1956.

He was the editor of the Journal of Semitic Studies from 1956 to 1960. From 1946 he led the Society for Old Testament Study as its Secretary (1946–60) and served as its president for the year 1950.

He lived in Stroud, Gloucestershire, until his death on 4 October 1969.

== Works ==
- Aspects of Reunion. London: Allen & Unwin. 1923.
- The Aramaic of the Old Testament: A Grammatical and Lexical Study of its Relation to Other Early Aramaic Dialects. Oxford: Oxford University Press. 1929.
- Darius the Mede and the Four World Empires in the Book of Daniel – A Survey of Current Opinions. Cardiff: University of Wales Press. 1935. – Repr. 1959
- Israel's Mission to the World. London: SCM Press. 1939.
- The Relevance of Apocalyptic: A Study of Jewish and Christian Apocalypses from Daniel to Revelation. London: Lutterworth Press. 1944. – 2nd ed. (1947) – 3rd ed. (1953)
- The Missionary Message of the Old Testament. London: Lutterworth Press. 1945.
- The Re-Discovery of the Old Testament. Philadelphia: Westminster Press. 1946.
- From Joseph to Joshua: Biblical Traditions in the Light of Archeology (Schweich Lectures of 1948). London: Clarendon Press. 1950.
- The Growth of the Old Testament. London, New York: Hutchinson's University Library. 1950.
- The Biblical Doctrine of Election. London: Lutterworth Press. 1950.
- The Old Testament and Modern Study: a generation of discovery and research. Society for Old Testament Study. Oxford: Clarendon Press. 1951.
- The Servant of the Lord and Other Essays on the Old Testament (2nd rev. ed.). Oxford: Basil Blackwell. 1952.
- The Zadokite Fragments and the Dead Sea Scrolls. London: Lutterworth Press. 1952.
- The Unity of the Bible. London: Carey Kingsgate Press. 1953.
- The Dead Sea Scrolls and their Significance. London: Independent Press Ltd. 1955. (2nd edition 1961)
- The Faith of Israel: Aspects of Old Testament Thought. London: SCM Press. 1956.
- H. H. Rowley and Matthew Black, ed. (1962). A. S. Peake, Commentary on the Bible. Edinburgh: Thomas Nelson.
- From Moses to Qumran; studies in the Old Testament. New York: Association Press. 1963.
- Worship in Ancient Israel: Its Forms and Meaning. London: S.P.C.K. 1967.
