= William Henry Bennett (biblical scholar) =

British minister, biblical scholar, and professor

William Henry Bennett (1855–1920) was a Congregationalist minister and biblical scholar with a particular interest in Old Testament prophecy and history. He was a proponent of historical criticism, and served as the first president of the Society for Old Testament Study..

== Life ==
Bennett was born in London on 22 May 1855 and was educated at the City of London School and Lancashire Independent College in Manchester. He also obtained a maths degree from the University of London, and studied theology at St John's College, Cambridge, 1878–1882, where he was the first Free Churchman to be elected a college fellow.

In 1884 Bennett was appointed professor of Hebrew, Church History, and New Testament at Rotherham Independent College. While teaching there he graduated Doctor of Divinity from the University of Aberdeen (1902). He also lectured in Hebrew at Firth College, Sheffield, the predecessor of the University of Sheffield, and was professor of Old Testament exegesis at Hackney College, 1888–1913, in tandem with the New College at Hackney from 1891. In 1913 he became principal of Lancashire Independent College.

He married Annie Wibley in Cambridge on 31 March 1885. They had two daughters. He died at Lancashire College on 27 August 1920.

== Publications ==
Bennett was a contributor to the Encyclopaedia Britannica. His other publications include:

- The Mishna as Illustrating the Gospels (1884)
- A Primer of the Bible (1897)
- Joshua and the Conquest of Palestine (1904)
- Religion of the Post-Exilic Prophets (1907)
- The Life of Christ According to St Mark (1907)
- Old Testament History (1909)
- The Moabite Stone (1911)
- The Historical Value of the Old Testament (1911)
- The Value of the Old Testament for To-Day (1914)
- The Bible: its Place in the Christian Life (1918)

In collaboration with Walter Frederic Adeney:

- The Bible Story Re-Told for Young People (1897)
- A Biblical Introduction (1899)
- The Bible and Criticism (1912)
