= Jacob Weingreen =

Hebrew professor in Dublin

Jacob Weingreen (January 1908 – 11 April 1995) was an Irish professor of Hebrew in Trinity College, Dublin – School of Religion and Theology between 1939 and 1979.

He excavated in Samaria and maintained contact with archaeologists who donated pieces to the Weingreen Museum of Biblical Antiquities which was named after him. Professor Weingreen was the author of A Practical Grammar for Classical Hebrew, a textbook that is still recognized as the standard teaching work on the subject. In 1961 Weingreen was president of the Society for Old Testament Study.

== Works ==
- A Practical Grammar for Classical Hebrew, Oxford University Press; 1st edition, 1939; 2nd edition, 1959. ISBN 0-19-815422-4
