= Barnabas Lindars =

English New Testament scholar

The Reverend Barnabas Lindars SSF
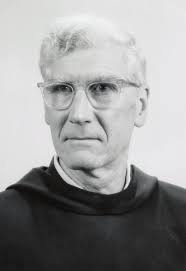
- Born: Frederick Chevallier Lindars; 11 June 1923
- Died: 21 October 1991 (aged 68)

Ecclesiastical career
- Church: Church of England
- Ordained: 1949 (priest)

Academic background
- Education: St. John's College, Cambridge

Academic work
- Discipline: Biblical studies
- Sub-discipline: New Testament studies
- Institutions: Jesus College, Cambridge; University of Manchester
- Doctoral students: D. A. Carson
- Influenced: D. A. Carson

Barnabas Lindars SSF (born Frederick Chevallier Lindars; 11 June 1923 – 21 October 1991) was an English New Testament scholar.

== Life ==
Lindars was educated at Altrincham Grammar School and then studied at St John's College, Cambridge. He was ordained as an Anglican priest in 1949. After teaching at the University of Cambridge (where he was Dean of Jesus College), Lindars served as Rylands Professor of Biblical Criticism and Exegesis at the University of Manchester from 1978 to 1990.

In 1988, It Is Written: Scripture Citing Scripture: Essays in Honour of Barnabas Lindars, SSF was published. It included contributions from C. K. Barrett, Richard Bauckham, G. K. Beale, D. A. Carson, R. E. Clements, and Morna D. Hooker.

== Selected works ==
- Judges 1-5 : A New Translation and Commentary (contribution), ed. by A. D. H. Mayes. Edinburgh, Scotland : T&T Clark, 1995
- John. Sheffield, England: Sheffield Academic Press, 1990
- The History of Christian Theology : Volume 2 : The Study and Use of the Bible, ed. by Paul Avis; John Rogerson, Grand Rapids : William B. Eerdmans, 1988
- The Gospel of John (New Century Bible Commentary). London, England: Marshall, Morgan & Scott; Grand Rapids, MI: Eerdmans, 1974.
- Peter R. Ackroyd and Barnabas Lindars (eds.), Words dans Meanings / Essays Presented to David Winton Thomas on his Retirement From the Regius Professorship of Hebrew in the University of Cambridge, 1968. Cambridge, England: Cambridge University Press, 1968
- New Testament Apologetic: The Doctrinal Significance of the Old Testament Quotations. London, England: SCM Press Ltd. 1961.
