= R. E. Clements =

British Old Testament scholar (1929–2024)

Ronald Ernest Clements (27 May 1929 – 2 April 2024) was a British Old Testament scholar. Clements was a fellow of Fitzwilliam College and Lecturer in Old Testament Literature and Theology at the University of Cambridge, before becoming Samuel Davidson Professor of Old Testament Studies at King's College London.

== Life ==
Clements was born on 27 May 1929. He was educated at Buckhurst Hill County High School in Essex, Spurgeon's Baptist College, Christ's College, Cambridge (BA, MA and DD), and Sheffield University, and was an assistant lecturer and lecturer at the University of Edinburgh before taking up a position as lecturer at Cambridge in 1967.

Clements was an evangelical who practiced a "moderate higher criticism", and has been described as "one of the most prolific British writers in the field of Old Testament". He wrote commentaries on Jeremiah (ISBN 0-80423-127-3), Ezekiel (ISBN 0-66425-272-9) and Isaiah (ISBN 0-80281-841-2).

Clements died on 2 April 2024, at the age of 94.

== Honours ==
In 1999, a Festschrift was published in his honour. In Search of True Wisdom: Essays in Old Testament Interpretation in Honour of Ronald E. Clements included contributions from John Barton, Walter Brueggemann, Brevard Childs, Rolf Rendtorff, and R. N. Whybray.

In 2013, Clements was awarded the Burkitt Medal by the British Academy 'in recognition of special service to Biblical Studies'.

== Books ==
- Prophecy and Covenant, 1965
- God and Temple, 1965
- Abraham and David, 1967
- Exodus (Cambridge Bible Commentary), 1972
- A Century of Old Testament Study, 1976
- Old Testament Theology: A Fresh Approach, 1978 ISBN 9780804237017
- Isaiah 1–39 (New Century Bible Commentary), 1980
- In Spirit and in Truth: Insights from Biblical Prayers (1985) ISBN 9780804200714
- Wisdom in Theology, 1992 ISBN 9781597526869
- Deuteronomy (Epworth Commentaries), 2001
