= Joannes Uri =

Hungarian orientalist

- Born: 27 December 1724; Nagykőrös, Kingdom of Hungary
- Died: 18 October 1796 (aged 71); Oxford, England

Academic work
- Discipline: Oriental studies

Joannes Uri or Uri János (1724–1796) was a Hungarian orientalist.

== Life ==
Born at Nagykőrös in Hungary, Uri studied the oriental languages under Jan Jacob Schultens at Leyden University, where he took the degrees of Ph.D. and D.D.

In 1766 the University of Oxford decided a catalogue should be made of the oriental manuscripts in the Bodleian Library for two hundred years. A scholar was sought to undertake this work, and on the advice of Sir Joseph Yorke, ambassador in the Netherlands, given to Archbishop Thomas Secker, Uri received an invitation to Oxford. There he was provided with a stipend, and set to compile the catalogue.

Uri did some teaching at Oxford, Joseph White being his most distinguished pupil. At the end of his life, he was discharged by the delegates of the Press, but through Henry Kett and other friends he obtained provision for his last years. He died at his lodgings in Oxford on 18 October 1796.

== Works ==
Uri published in 1761 a short treatise on Hebrew etymology, Prima decas originum Hebræarum genuinarum. For the Leyden library he produced an edition of the Arabic poem Al-Burda in honour of the prophet Mohammed, with a Latin translation and further notes on Hebrew etymology.

After 20 years, the Bodleian catalogue appeared in 1787, as Bibliothecæ Bodleianæ Codd. MStorum Orientalium videlicet Hebræorum, Chaldaicorum, Syriacorum, &c., Catalogus. It has been criticised for mistakes (many corrected in the second volume of the catalogue by Alexander Nicoll and Edward Pusey, which appeared in 1835), and its arrangement.

While at Oxford Uri published an edition of some Persian and Turkish letters (1771), and also a short commentary on Daniel's Prophecy of the Weeks and other points of Old Testament exegesis.
