= Gandell =

Gandell is a surname. Notable people with the surname include:

- Alan Gandell (1904–1988), New Zealand civil engineer
- Robert Gandell (1818–1887), British academic and biblical scholar
