= Julia Bray =

British orientalist (born 1952)

- Born: 28 September 1952 (age 74); Cambridge, England

Academic background
- Education: Collège Sévigné
- Alma mater: St Hilda's College, Oxford; St Cross College, Oxford

Academic work
- Discipline: Oriental studies
- Sub-discipline: Arabic literature
- Institutions: University of Manchester; University of Edinburgh; Faculty of Oriental Studies, University of Oxford; St Antony's College, Oxford; University of St Andrews; University of Paris 8 Vincennes-Saint-Denis; St John's College, Oxford

Julia Margaret Bray (born 28 September 1952) is a British scholar of Oriental studies who specialises in Medieval to Early Modern Arabic literature. From 2012 to 2023, she was the Laudian Professor of Arabic at the University of Oxford and a Fellow of St John's College, Oxford. She previously taught Arabic and Arabic literature at the universities of Manchester, Edinburgh and St Andrews, and was Professeur de littérature arabe médiévale at the Paris 8 University from 2003 to 2012.

== Early life and education ==
Bray was born on 28 September 1952 in Cambridge, England. She was educated at the Collège Sévigné, an all-girls private school in Paris, France. She read Oriental Studies at St Hilda's College, Oxford, graduating with a Bachelor of Arts (BA) degree in 1974. After working as an archivist, she studied for a Doctor of Philosophy (DPhil) degree at St Cross College, Oxford. She completed her DPhil in 1984.

== Academic career ==
In 1983, Bray joined the University of Manchester as a lecturer in Arabic. She was then a senior lecturer in Arabic at the University of Edinburgh from 1989 to 1992. She was a visiting lecturer at St Antony's College, Oxford for the 1994/95 academic year, and James Mew Senior Research Fellow in Arabic in the Faculty of Oriental Studies, University of Oxford, from 1994 to 1996. She was senior lecturer in Arabic at the University of St Andrews from 1996 to 2003, and then Professeur de littérature arabe médiévale at the University of Paris 8 Vincennes-Saint-Denis from 2003 to 2012.

Since September 2012, she has been the Laudian Professor of Arabic at the University of Oxford. She is also a Fellow of St John's College, Oxford. She co-edits (with Wen-chin Ouyang) the Edinburgh Studies in Classical Arabic Literature monograph series, published by Edinburgh University Press. The chair was renamed the Abdulaziz Saud AlBabtain Laudian Professorship of Arabic in after a re-endowment in 2016. Bray retired from the position in 2023, and was replaced by Tahera Qutbuddin.

Bray's research covers medieval Arabic literature (pre-1800), especially poetry, narrative and biography. As well as formal literary analysis of Classical Arabic literature, she uses it as a source for the history of ideas, and to analyse social and cultural meanings.

== Selected works ==
- Ashtiany, Julia (1982). The Arabic documents in the archives of the British Political Agency, Kuwait, 1904-1949. London: India Office Library and Records.
- Ashtiany, J.; Johnstone, T; Latham, J.; Serjeant, R., eds. (1990). Abbasid Belles Lettres. The Cambridge History of Arabic Literature. Cambridge: Cambridge University Press.
- Ashtiany, Julia (1993). Media Arabic. The New Edinburgh Islamic Surveys. Edinburgh: Edinburgh University Press.
- Bray, Julia, ed. (2006). Writing and representation in medieval Islam: Muslim horizons. New York, NY: Routledge. ISBN 9781134171545.
