= Everleigh, Wiltshire =

Village in Wiltshire, England

Coordinates: 51.283°N 1.708°W

Everleigh
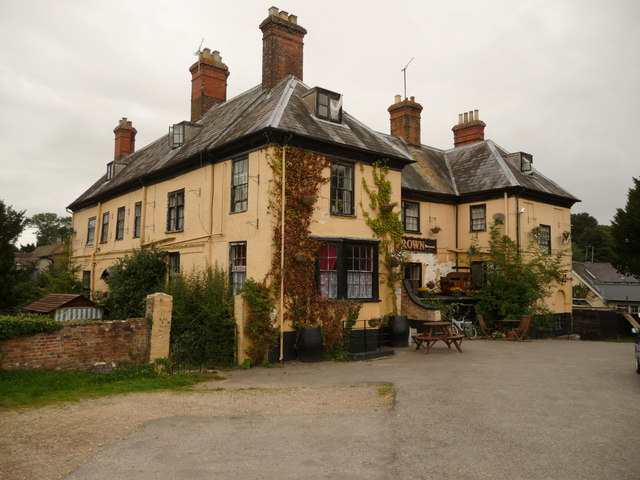
- The Crown Hotel

- Location within Wiltshire
- Population: 211 (in 2011)
- OS grid reference: SU204538
- Civil parish: Everleigh
- Unitary authority: Wiltshire
- Ceremonial county: Wiltshire
- Region: South West
- Country: England
- Sovereign state: United Kingdom
- Post town: Marlborough
- Postcode district: SN8
- Dialling code: 01264
- Police: Wiltshire
- Fire: Dorset and Wiltshire
- Ambulance: South Western
- UK Parliament: East Wiltshire
- Website: www.everleigh.org

Everleigh, pronounced and also sometimes spelled Everley, is a village and civil parish in east Wiltshire, England, about 4 1/2 miles (7 km) southeast of the town of Pewsey, towards the northeast of Salisbury Plain.

The village is also known as East Everleigh, to distinguish it from the hamlet of Lower Everleigh which lies about 1 mile (1.6 km) further west on the A342 road that connects Andover and Devizes. The village is surrounded by land known as Everleigh Drop Zone, owned by the Ministry of Defence that is used for military training as part of the Salisbury Plain Training Area.

== History ==
The partly-forested area was known for recreational hunting. By the 13th century there was a deer park and a rabbit warren, and later activities included hare coursing, falconry and racehorse training. East Everleigh developed at a crossroads where the old Marlborough-Salisbury road (now only a track in the south of the parish) met the Devizes-Andover road (now the A342). In the 18th and 19th centuries, several inns provided refreshment and lodging.

The Everleigh estate was bought by Sir John Astley in 1765, and inherited in 1771 by his cousin Francis Dugdale Astley; it continued as the seat of the Astley baronets until the middle of the next century. Sir Francis made changes to the village layout around 1811, removing buildings which stood close to the manor house and diverting the road away from it. Those demolished included the old church (rebuilt by Sir Francis further west) and the Rose and Crown inn.

== Manor house ==
James VI and I and Anne of Denmark came from Wilton House to Everleigh on 31 August 1603 to visit Mr Sadler, a son of Queen Elizabeth's Ambassador to Scotland, Sir Ralph Sadler.

The present 21,265 sq ft (1,975.6 m^{2}) Everleigh Manor was built in the 18th century, possibly on the site of the earlier house, and extended with east and west wings later in the century. In 1882 the central block was virtually reconstructed following a fire. It is a two-storey country house in brick and stone, originally five bays, extended to nine.

The Manor House was once a holding area for the prisoners during the Bloody Assizes with trials held by Judge Jeffreys in 1685. It was connected to a public house nearby, known as "The Crown", by a tunnel where prisoners would be led to and from the court house and manor. The tunnel is now blocked up on either end of both the manor and public house, but the tunnel still exists to this day.

The manor house was bought by the National Deposit Friendly Society in 1921, for use as a convalescent home. The house was requisitioned in 1939 and, with new buildings added in its grounds, became a military hospital used by the US Army; there was also a vaccine laboratory. In 1951 the west wing was named the David Bruce Laboratory, and by this time the site was used by the Royal Army Medical Corps; the house and grounds were bought by the War Office in 1954. The Ordnance Survey 1:25,000 map of 1958 shows many small buildings in the grounds to the northwest of the manor house.

The Army left the site c. 1990 and the house returned to use as a private residence. As of 2016, the west wing is operated as a hotel.

== Parish church ==
Everleigh had a parish church by 1228, when it was granted to the Benedictine Wherwell Abbey in Hampshire. However, the mediaeval parish church was demolished in 1814 when the present Church of England parish church of Saint Peter was consecrated on a site about 0.5 miles (800 m) northwest of it. The present church was designed by the architect John Morlidge in a Georgian Gothic Revival style. It includes the original Norman font from the old church.

The Wiltshire and Swindon History Centre holds the parish registers for 1598 to 1971 (baptisms), 1598-1974 (marriages), and 1598-1984 (burials). The population in 1831 was 352, but by 1951 it had fallen to 264.

Rev. Prof. John Wallis (1675-1738), who was rector of Everleigh from 1716, was at the same time Laudian Professor of Arabic at the University of Oxford. In the 1760s the living was held by John Butler, who was later Bishop of Oxford and Bishop of Hereford.

== Local government ==
Everleigh is a civil parish with an elected parish council. The village is in the area of Wiltshire Council unitary authority, which is responsible for all significant local government functions.

== Recreation ==
The Orange Way long-distance footpath passes through Everleigh village in a southwest–northeast direction.
