= Jessie Payne Margoliouth =

British Syriac scholar and campaigner for women's suffrage

- Born: Jessie Payne Smith; 23 February 1856; Kensington, London, England
- Died: 18 August 1933 (aged 77); Boars Hill, Oxfordshire, England
- Occupations: Syriac scholar and lexicographer
- Notable work: Thesaurus Syriacus (1901); A Compendious Syriac Dictionary (1903); Supplement to the Thesaurus Syriacus of R. Payne Smith (1927)
- Spouse: David Samuel Margoliouth (m. 1896)
- Parent: Robert Payne Smith (father)

Jessie Payne Margoliouth (née Smith; 23 February 1856 – 18 August 1933) was a British Syriac scholar and campaigner for women's suffrage.

== Biography ==
Margoliouth was born Jessie Payne Smith on 23 February 1856 in Kensington, London, England. Her father was Robert Payne Smith (1818–1895), a theologian and Anglican priest. She was brought up in Oxford and Canterbury. Her father taught her Syriac and lexicography. She assisted her father with the Thesaurus Syriacus (a Syriac to Latin dictionary), and, following his death, she saw it through to completion in 1901. She also abridged and translated the Thesaurus Syriacus into English in 1903 as A compendious Syriac Dictionary (Syriac to English). She later published a Supplement to the Thesaurus Syriacus of R. Payne Smith in 1927, adding 345 pages of new entries.

On 25 April 1896, she married David Samuel Margoliouth, Laudian Professor of Arabic at the University of Oxford. They had a happy marriage but did not have any children.

Margoliouth was a devout Christian. She was active with the Archbishop of Canterbury's Mission to the Assyrian Christians from the 1880s. The mission's aims were to strengthen the faith and religious practice of Assyrian Christians, explicitly not to convert others to Christianity. In 1913, she jointly edited with the Reverend F. N. Heazell an account of the mission titled Kurds and Christians.

Margoliouth was a strong supporter of women's suffrage. From 1904 to 1916, she was the first chair of the Oxford Women's Suffrage Society (a member of the National Union of Women's Suffrage Societies): it was founded in 1904 and initially met in her drawing room. She was also the founding chair of the Oxford branch of the Church League for Women's Suffrage, serving from 1910 until 1913.

Margoliouth died on 18 August 1933 in Boars Hill, Oxfordshire. She was buried Hoop Lane Cemetery, Golders Green, London.
