= Robert Payne Smith =

British clergyman and theologian (1818–1895)

The Very Reverend Robert Payne Smith
- Dean of Canterbury
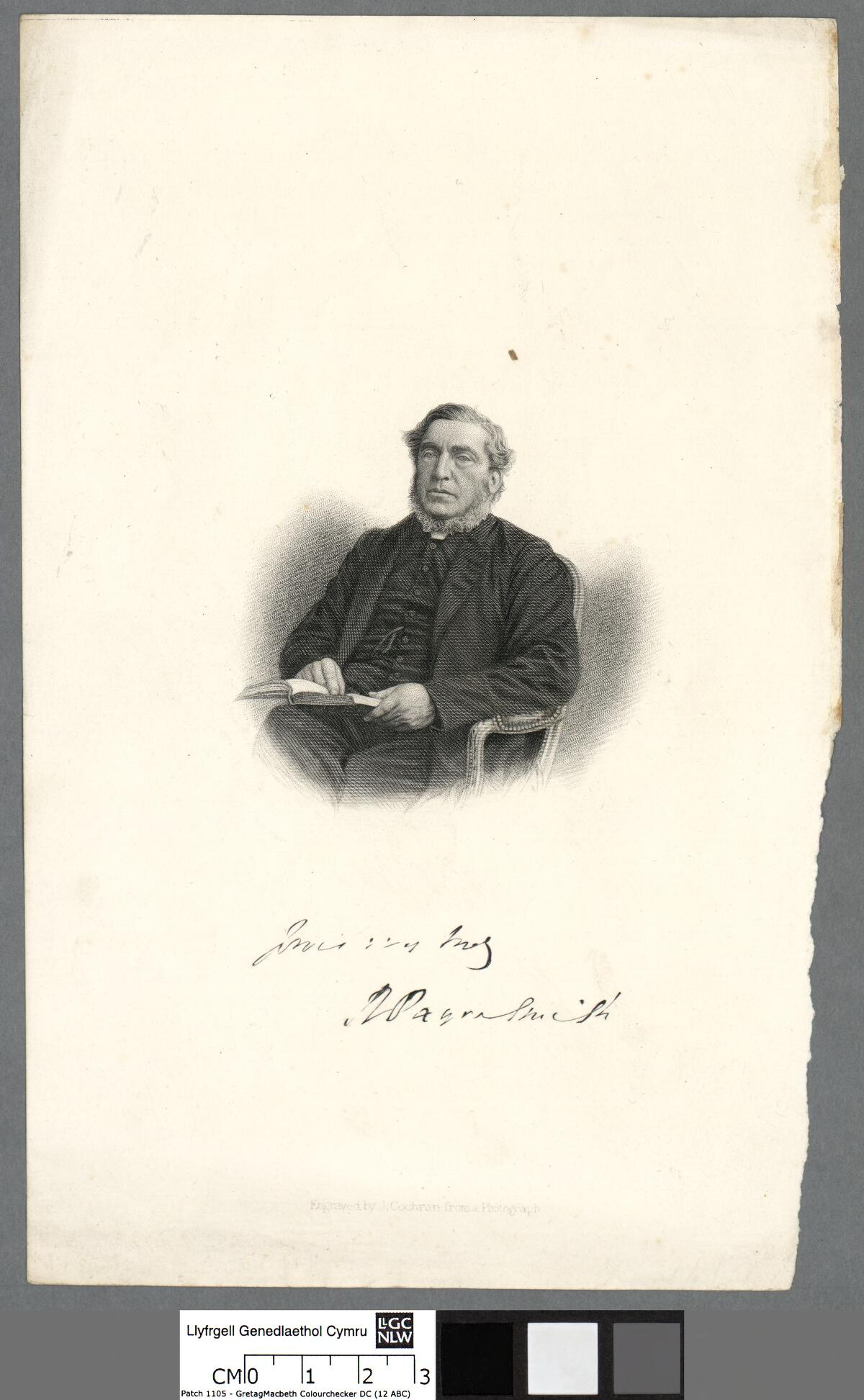
- Church: Church of England
- Diocese: Diocese of Canterbury
- In office: 1871 to 1895
- Predecessor: Henry Alford
- Successor: Frederic Farrar
- Other posts: Regius Professor of Divinity, Oxford University (1865–1871)

Orders
- Ordination: 1843 (deacon); 1844 (priest)

Personal details
- Born: 7 November 1818 Chipping Campden, Gloucestershire, England
- Died: 31 March 1895 (aged 76) Canterbury, Kent, England
- Denomination: Anglicanism
- Parents: Robert Smith and Esther Argles Payne
- Spouse: Catherine Freeman
- Children: Six
- Profession: Clergyman and theologian

Robert Payne Smith (7 November 1818 – 31 March 1895) was Regius Professor of Divinity at the University of Oxford and Canon of Christ Church from 1865 until 1870, when he was appointed Dean of Canterbury by Queen Victoria on the advice of William Ewart Gladstone.

== Early life and education ==
Payne Smith was born in Chipping Campden, Gloucestershire, on 7 November 1818, the only son and second of four children of Robert Smith, a land agent, and his wife, Esther Argles Payne, of Leggsheath, Surrey. He attended Chipping Campden Grammar School and was taught Hebrew by his eldest sister, Esther. In 1837 he obtained an exhibition at Pembroke College, Oxford, to study classics. In 1841 he graduated with second-class honours. Payne Smith won the Boden Sanskrit scholarship in 1840 and the Pusey and Ellerton Hebrew scholarship in 1843.

== Career ==
In 1843, he became a fellow of Pembroke College and was ordained a deacon, and became a priest a year later.

He gave the 1869 Bampton Lectures at Oxford and he was a member of the Old Testament Revision Committee from 1870 until 1885, the whole duration of the committee's existence.

He provided the chapter on Genesis in Charles Ellicott's A Bible Commentary for English Readers (1877-84) and the chapter on Zechariah in The Bible Educator; (1870-74). He preached a series of sermons at Oxford beginning in 1858 which he later compiled into a commentary on Isaiah entitled The Authenticity and Messianic Interpretation of the Prophecies of Isaiah (1862).

His greatest work, however, was his editorship for the Oxford University Press of the great of Syriac-Latin lexicon, the Thesaurus Syriacus (1868–1901), on which he worked from its conception until his death when the editorship of the Thesaurus passed to his daughter, Jessie Payne Margoliouth, who abridged it into a Syriac-English dictionary, A Compendious Syriac Dictionary (1903), and who late in life published the Supplement to the Thesaurus Syriacus of R. Payne Smith (1927).

He died at his deanery on 31 March 1895 and was buried on 3 April in St Martin's churchyard, Canterbury.

== Family ==
Robert and Catherine had six children:

- Robert Payne Smith, ( -1917) cleric.
- William Henry Payne Smith, assistant master at Rugby School.
- Catherine Elizabeth Payne Smith (1854-1944), married Alfred Mellor Watkin.
- Mary Payne Smith (1858-1927)
- Jessie Payne Smith (1856-1933), British Syriac scholar and campaigner for women's suffrage, married David Samuel Margoliouth.
- Esther Payne Smith (1861-1939), benefactor, educator and missionary at Pietermaritzburg.

Church of England titles
Preceded by Henry Alford	Dean of Canterbury; 1871–1895	Succeeded by Frederic Farrar
Academic offices
Preceded by William Jacobson	Regius Professor of Divinity at Oxford; 1865—1871	Succeeded by James Bowling Mozley
