= Laudian Professor of Arabic =

Professorship at the University of Oxford

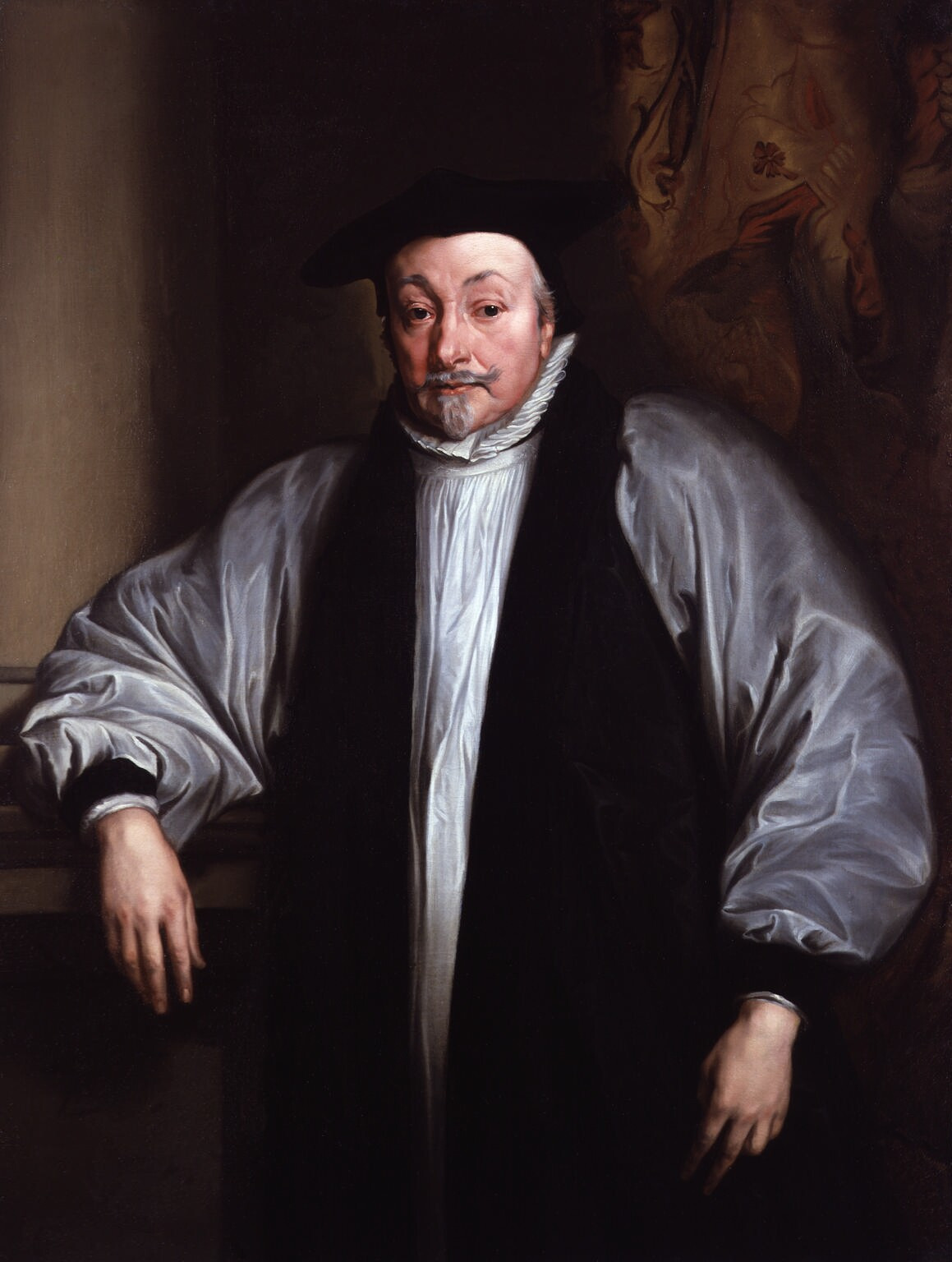
William Laud, founder of the professorship

The position of Laudian Professor of Arabic, now known as the Abdulaziz Saud AlBabtain Laudian Professor, at the University of Oxford was established in 1636 by William Laud, who at the time was Chancellor of the University of Oxford and Archbishop of Canterbury. The first professor was Edward Pococke, who was working as a chaplain in Aleppo in what is now Syria when Laud asked him to return to Oxford to take up the position. Laud's regulations for the professorship required lectures on Arabic grammar and literature to be delivered weekly during university vacations and Lent. He also provided that the professor's lectures were to be attended by all medical students and Bachelors of Arts at the university, although this seems not to have happened since Pococke had few students, despite the provision for non-attenders to be fined. In 1881, a university statute repealed Laud's regulations and provided that the professor was to lecture in "the Arabic, Syriac, and Chaldee Languages", and attached the professorship to a fellowship at St John's College. In 2016, a large re-endowment from Kuwaiti philanthropist Abdulaziz Saud Al Babtain occasioned a change of the chair's name.

The standard of the professors has varied. The second professor, Thomas Hyde, is described by the Oxford Dictionary of National Biography as a "mediocre orientalist", and one history of the university says of the third professor, John Wallis, that "not only did [he] give no lectures for most of his long tenure, but he did nothing to advance knowledge either." Pococke, Joseph White, Sir Hamilton Gibb, and Alfred Beeston have received high praise for their scholarship.

David Margoliouth (professor 1889–1937) taught the syllabus for the final examinations in lectures over two years, forcing some students to tackle the more difficult texts in their first year of study. Successive professors had few students until after the Second World War, when numbers increased because of the reputation of the then professor, Gibb, and because some British students became interested in Arabic culture while serving in the Middle East during the war. Julia Bray, the first woman to hold the position, was appointed in 2012. The current Laudian Professor, Tahera Qutbuddin, was appointed in 2023 and is the first non-European and first Muslim person to hold the position.

== History ==
=== Foundation ===
The position of Laudian Professor of Arabic at the University of Oxford was established in 1636 by William Laud (Chancellor of the University of Oxford from 1630 to 1641 and Archbishop of Canterbury from 1633 to 1645). Laud wrote to Edward Pococke, who was serving as chaplain in Aleppo in the Aleppo Eyalet of the Ottoman Empire (now in modern-day Syria) to improve his knowledge of Arabic language and literature, requesting his return to Oxford to become the first Laudian Professor. Pococke returned in 1636 and gave his inaugural lecture on 10 August of that year. Laud also bought Arabic books for the Bodleian Library, with Pococke's assistance. Laud endowed the chair with revenues from lands in the parish of Bray, Berkshire. When he made the endowment perpetual in 1640, the university sent him a letter of thanks, saying that he had "greatly enriched" the library "by importing Araby into Oxford", had "unlocked the learning of Barbary" (i.e. the Barbary Coast of north Africa) by provision of the professorship, and had shown "untiring munificence" in endowing the chair. Laud reserved to himself the right to appoint subsequent professors during his lifetime, and afterwards provided for professors to be appointed by the President of St John's College, Oxford, the Warden of All Souls College, Oxford and the Warden of New College, Oxford (or a majority of them). He never exercised this right, as he died in 1645 while Pococke survived until 1691.

=== University statutes for the professorship ===
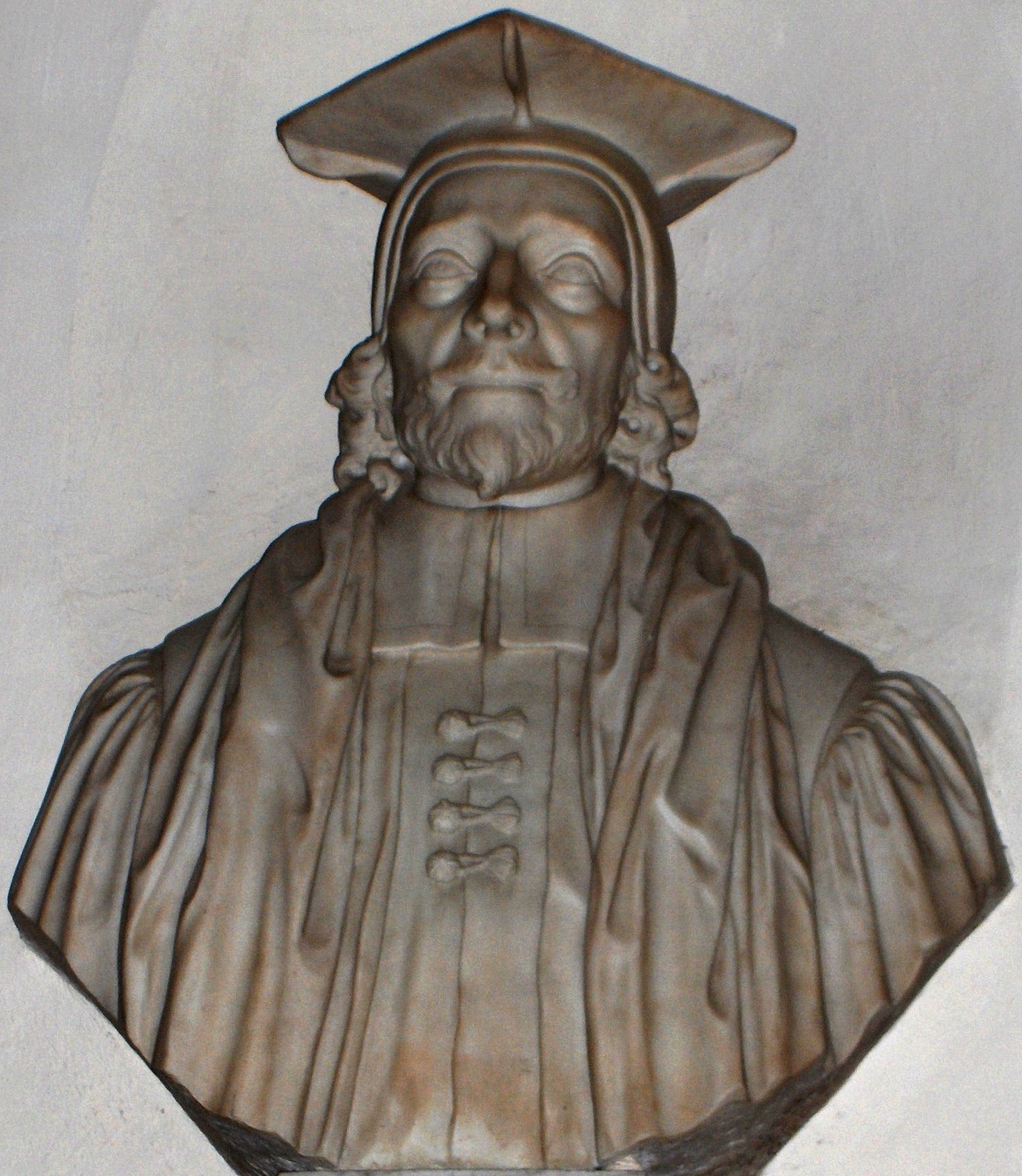
The memorial to Edward Pococke, the first professor, in Christ Church Cathedral, Oxford

University regulations introduced by Laud prescribed that the professor was to lecture for one hour every Wednesday between university terms at 9am (and during Lent at 8am) on Arabic grammar and literature, using "the work of some approved and ancient author, in which the proprities of the language and the elegance of the expression are remarkable." Failure to deliver a lecture on an appointed day would be marked with a fine of 20 shillings, unless the professor was very ill or had an urgent reason for absence approved by the vice-chancellor. Laud required the lecturer to speak without using "a hurried enunciation, but make all his statements in such a way that they may be readily taken down in writing by his hearers", and to remain after the lecture to listen to any questions "with kindness, and solve the difficulties and doubts mooted." Although all Bachelors of Arts and all medical students at the university were required to attend, this does not seem to have happened: Pococke only had a few students in the years that he was in Oxford. Laud's statutes provided that a student failing to attend the lecture without gaining the approval of the vice-chancellor would be fined sixpence. Fines were to be used to purchase Arabic books for the Bodleian Library.

After reforms of the university during the second half of the 19th century, a university statute of 1881 set out the professor's duties and entitlements, and who should form the board appointing a new professor. It stated that "The Laudian Professor of Arabic shall lecture and give instruction on the Arabic, Syriac, and Chaldee Languages." The professor was to be appointed by a board consisting of the Secretary of State for India, the President of St John's College, Oxford, the Regius Professor of Hebrew, the Boden Professor of Sanskrit and Bodley's Librarian. The chair was attached to a fellowship at St John's College, which would contribute £450 (Note: Updating for inflation using the Retail Price Index (RPI), £450 in 1881 was worth approximately £39,610 in 2013 (the latest year for which data is available as of February 2015). Updating the sum to represent an equivalent share of the United Kingdom's gross domestic product (GDP), £450 in 1881 was worth approximately £573,400 in 2013.) towards the professor's income. Sir Hamilton Gibb was the first Laudian Professor to be a fellow of St John's; although David Margoliouth, his predecessor, was appointed after the statute came into force, he stayed at New College where he was already a fellow. Before the 1881 statute, the professor remained at the college (if any) with which he had links before his appointment.

Changes to the university's internal legislation in the 20th and early 21st centuries abolished specific statutes for the duties of, and rules for appointment to, individual chairs such as the Laudian professorship. The University Council is now empowered to make appropriate arrangements for appointments and conditions of service, and the college to which any professorship is allocated (St John's in the case of the Laudian chair) has two representatives on the board of electors.

=== Re-endowment ===
In 2016, the university received a large donation from Abdulaziz Saud Al Babtain to secure the chair. As such, the chair was renamed the Abdulaziz Saud AlBabtain Laudian Professorship in Arabic in recognition of its latest benefactor and its original one.

=== Professors ===
The professorship was suspended for two years after the death of Robert Gandell in 1887. The electoral board had met to select a successor, but were unable to make a suitable appointment, and so obtained the permission of the university authorities to adjourn. When the board resumed in 1889, one of the previous applicants, David Margoliouth, re-applied for the position and was successful, even though none of the people recommending him made any mention of whether he knew any Arabic. As professor, Margoliouth taught the syllabus for the final examinations in lectures over two years, regardless of the stage that students had reached, and regarded it as bad luck if a student had to tackle the more difficult texts in one year and the easier texts in the next.

Between 1916—when the university introduced a Doctorate of Philosophy for research—and 1939, there were few post-graduate students, and only one or two undergraduates took Arabic in final examinations each year. The subject grew in popularity after the Second World War: Gibb had an international reputation that attracted foreign students, while others from the United Kingdom who had spent time in the Middle East during the war were interested in studying Arabic language and culture. Tahera Qutbuddin, the current holder as of 2024, was appointed in 2023. She is the 16th Laudian professor.

== List of professors ==
Name	Professor	Education (Note: At the University of Oxford, unless otherwise indicated)	College as Professor	Notes
Edward Pococke	1636–91	Magdalen Hall and Corpus Christi College	Corpus Christi College	Pococke started studying Arabic with William Bedwell in 1625, and became chaplain to the Levant Company in Aleppo (in modern-day Syria) in 1630 to improve his knowledge further. He returned in 1636 at the request of William Laud, who had decided to make Pococke the first appointment to the chair. Thomas Greaves was Pococke's deputy between 1637 and 1641 when Pococke travelled to Constantinople for research and to collect manuscripts. Pococke was appointed Regius Professor of Hebrew in 1648, but his refusal to promise loyalty to the Commonwealth of England led to the parliamentary committee supervising the university to order his removal from both professorships. However, the committee was persuaded to stay the order until a replacement could be found, and it was never implemented. Pococke has been described as "the finest European Arabist of his time ... and among the greatest of all time."
Thomas Hyde	1691–1703	University of Cambridge (King's College) and The Queen's College, Oxford	Christ Church (Note: Hyde was member of Queen's before his time as Laudian Professor, but was never appointed to a fellowship of the college. His appointment as Regius Professor of Hebrew carried with it a canonry at Christ Church Cathedral, Oxford.)	Hyde was Bodley's Librarian from 1665 to 1701 (when he resigned because of "the toil and drudgery of daily attendance in all times and weathers") and was also Regius Professor of Hebrew from 1697. His interest in oriental languages came from his father, a rector in Shropshire. He is described in the Oxford Dictionary of National Biography as "a mediocre orientalist", who carried out little teaching despite having significant linguistic skills. He had a strong intellectual interest in oriental languages and peoples, although his inability to finish work meant that he published little. Although he carried out his work at Oxford in a "lethargic manner", a Dutch scholar described him as "stupor mundi" ("the wonder of the world") when told of his death.
John Wallis	1703–38	Wadham College and Magdalen College	Magdalen College	Wallis was an absentee professor, holding parish posts at various times in Essex, Hampshire and Wiltshire. John Gagnier, who became Lord Almoner's Professor of Arabic in 1724, was appointed as deputy to Wallis in 1718. One history of the university says of Wallis that "not only did [he] give no lectures for most of his long tenure, but he did nothing to advance knowledge either."
Thomas Hunt	1738–74	Christ Church	Hart Hall	Hunt was also Lord Almoner's Professor of Arabic from 1740 to 1747 and Regius Professor of Hebrew in 1747 until his death in 1774. He published extensively on Arabic and Hebrew matters, and was a well-regarded scholar who encouraged others.
Joseph White	1774–1814	Wadham College	Wadham College	White was prompted by his benefactor, John Moore (later Archbishop of Canterbury), to study Syriac, Arabic and Persian, leading to his unanimous election to the chair in 1774. His Bampton Lecture in 1784, a comparison of Christianity and Islam, was widely praised. He resigned his fellowship at Wadham in 1787 after being appointed rector of Melton, Suffolk, but retained his professorship, also becoming Regius Professor of Hebrew in 1804. His scholarship has led to him being described as one of "the major Hebraists of the century".
Thomas Winstanley	1814–23	Brasenose College	St Alban Hall	Winstanley succeeded Thomas Warton as Camden Professor of Ancient History in 1790 and was elected principal of St Alban Hall in 1797. He held the Laudian chair in addition to the Camden chair. His version of Theodore Goulston's 1623 edition of Aristotelous peri poiētikēs: Aristotelis de poetica liber (1780), with a Latin version of the text and accompanying notes, was used at Oxford until sometime in the 19th century.
Wyndham Knatchbull	1823–40	Christ Church	All Souls College (Note: Knatchbull's fellowship at All Souls ended in 1840, and he is not recorded as being a member of a college after that date.)	Knatchbull, a son of Sir Edward Knatchbull, 8th Baronet, was a clergyman of various Kent parishes from 1811 until his death in 1868. He was considered to be a possible successor to Alexander Nicoll, Regius Professor of Hebrew, who died in 1828; Edward Bouverie Pusey was appointed instead.
Stephen Reay	1840–61	St Alban Hall	— (Note: Reay had an office in the Bodleian Library and is not recorded as holding a college appointment.)	Reay, a Scottish clergyman, published little: the only work that he is known to have authored was a pamphlet, "Observations on the defence of the Church Missionary Society against the objections of the Archdeacon of Bath" (1818), although he also edited a couple of Hebrew texts. Reay was appointed Under-Librarian at the Bodleian Library in 1828 by Bulkeley Bandinel, Bodley's Librarian. Reay held this post and his professorship until his death.
Robert Gandell	1861–87	St John's College and The Queen's College	Magdalen Hall / Hertford College and Corpus Christi College (Note: Gandell was a tutor at Magdalen Hall (1848–72) and a fellow (1874–87) of its successor institution, Hertford College. He was also chaplain of Corpus Christi College (1852–77).)	Gandell was also a prebendary of Wells Cathedral from 1874, and a canon of the cathedral from 1880. His publications included a four-volume edition of John Lightfoot's Horae Hebraicae (1859), and commentaries on some books of the Old Testament.
David Margoliouth	1889–1937	New College	New College	Margoliouth had a superlative academic career as a student, winning many prizes and scholarships, including awards in Hebrew, Syriac and Sanskrit. When he applied for the chair, his referees gave no indication that he knew any Arabic, but within five years of his appointment he published two important works on Arabic. Lacking regular assistance from a tutor to instruct students in elementary Arabic, Margoliouth had a heavy workload, but effectively left students to acquire the rudiments of the language themselves. He also taught Syriac and Ethiopic when needed.
Sir Hamilton Gibb	1937–55	University of Edinburgh and the School of Oriental Studies, London	St John's College	Gibb was previously a professor at the School of Oriental Studies, and was highly regarded as a teacher and scholar with a wide range of knowledge. Arabic expanded as an academic subject at Oxford after the Second World War, as students returned from the war with experience of the Middle East, with international students attracted by Gibb's reputation. He left in 1955 to become James Richard Jewett Professor of Arabic at Harvard University and director of Harvard's Center for Middle Eastern Studies.
Alfred Beeston	1955–78	Christ Church	St John's College	Beeston developed an interest in languages at school, teaching himself Arabic. After initially studying classics at Oxford, he switched to Arabic and Persian, under Margoliouth. He finished his doctorate while working in the oriental books department of the Bodleian Library, becoming Keeper of the department and sub-librarian in 1946 after his return from war service in Palestine. As professor, he expanded the Arabic syllabus (which previously stopped in 1400) to ensure that students studied all periods from pre-Islamic verse to the 20th century. He has been described as "one of the foremost Arabists of the twentieth century".
Wilferd Madelung	1978–98	Georgetown University, University of Cairo, and University of Hamburg	St John's College	Madelung was a cultural attaché at the West German embassy in Baghdad between 1958 and 1960. He was a professor at the University of Chicago before moving to Oxford, holding a Guggenheim Fellowship from 1972 to 1973. Since retiring from Oxford, he has been a senior research fellow at the Institute of Ismaili Studies and a fellow at the Institute of Advanced Studies of the Hebrew University of Jerusalem.
Geert Jan van Gelder	1998–2012	University of Amsterdam and University of Leiden	St John's College	Van Gelder was a lecturer in Arabic at the University of Groningen from 1975 to 1998. He was appointed as a member of the Royal Netherlands Academy of Arts and Sciences in 1997 and a Fellow of the British Academy in 2005. His interests cover a wide range of topics in classical Arabic prose and poetry.
Julia Bray	2012–2023	St Hilda's College and St Cross College	St John's College	Bray, who studied Arabic and Persian at Oxford, studies the relationship between Arabic literary and social history. Before taking up the Laudian professorship, she was professor of Medieval Arabic Literature at Paris 8 University. Bray was the first woman to take up the position.
Tahera Qutbuddin	2023 onwards	Ain Shams University and Harvard University	St John's College	Qutbuddin was a professor of Arabic at the University of Chicago until 2023. She is the first non-European, and first Muslim, to take up the position. She was a Guggenheim Fellow in 2020 and won the Sheikh Zayed Book Award in 2021. She is best known for her works on Arabic oratory and the usage of Arabic in India, especially in the Dawoodi Bohra tradition. She teaches classical Arabic literature from the seventh to nineteenth centuries.

== See also ==
- List of professorships at the University of Oxford
- Lord Almoner's Professor of Arabic
