= David Samuel Margoliouth =

British orientalist (1858–1940)

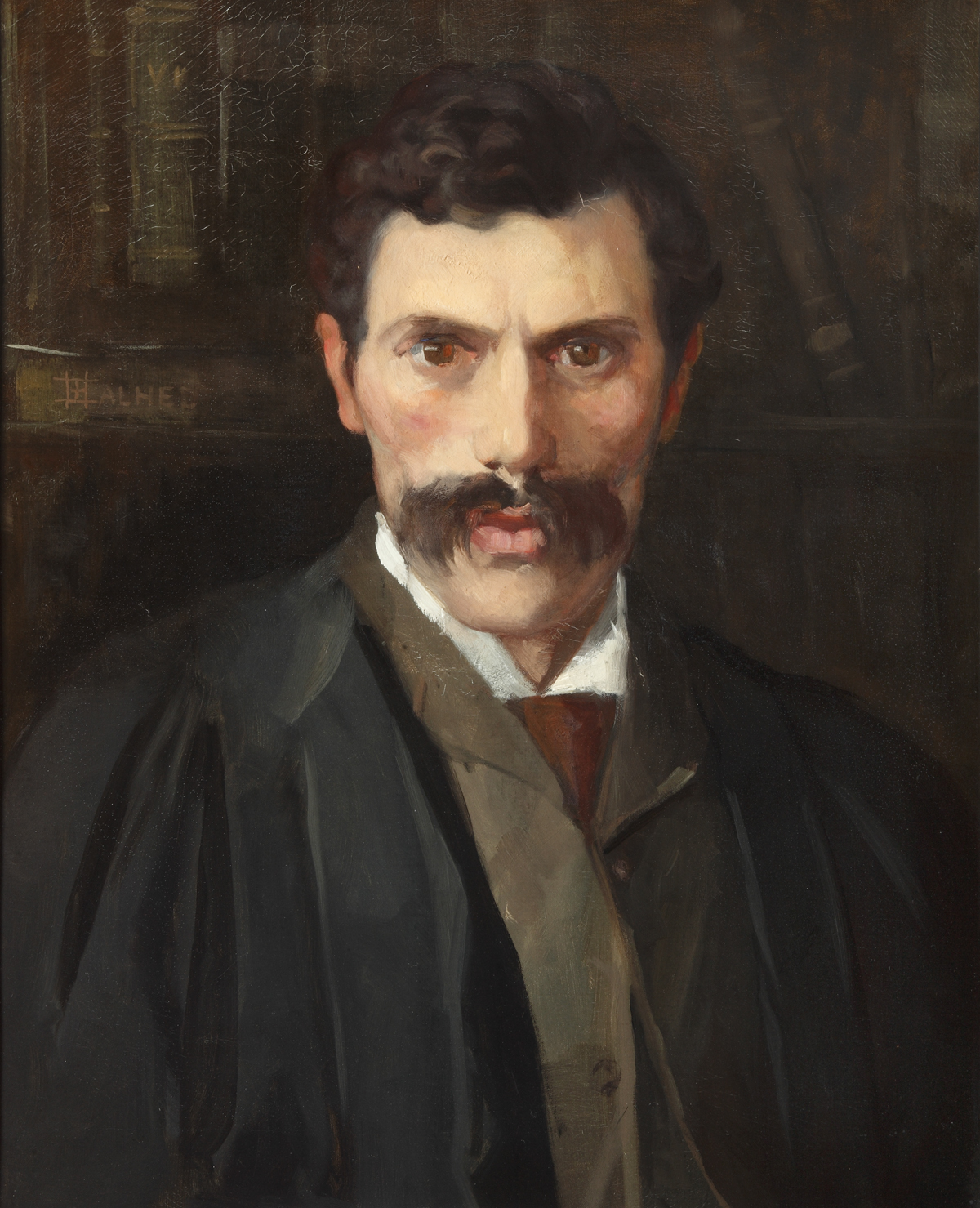
- D.S. Margoliouth
- Born: 17 October 1858; London, England
- Died: 22 March 1940 (aged 81); London, England
- Education: New College, Oxford, England
- Known for: Scholar, linguist, translator, editor and author
- Movement: Orientalist

David Samuel Margoliouth, FBA (/mɑːrˈɡoʊliəθ/; 17 October 1858, in London – 22 March 1940, in London) was an English orientalist. He was briefly active as a priest in the Church of England. He was Laudian Professor of Arabic at the University of Oxford from 1889 to 1937.

== Life ==
His father, Ezekiel, had converted from Judaism to Anglicanism, and thereafter worked in Bethnal Green as a missionary to the Jews; he was also close to his uncle, the Anglican convert Moses Margoliouth. Margoliouth was educated at Winchester College, where he was a scholar, and at New College, Oxford where he graduated with a double first Bachelor of Arts (BA) in literae humaniores in 1880: he won an unprecedented number of prizes in Classics and Oriental languages, of which he had mastered Arabic, Persian, Turkish, Armenian and Syriac, in addition to Hebrew. His academic dissertation, published in 1888, was entitled Analecta Orientalia ad Poeticam Aristoteleam. In 1889, he succeeded to the Laudian Chair of Arabic, a position he held until he retired, from ill health, in 1937. He received the degree Doctor of Letters (D.Litt.) from New College in July 1902.

Many of his works on the history of Islam became the standard treatises in English, including Mohammed and the Rise of Islam (1905), The Early Development of Mohammedanism (1914), and The Relations Between Arabs and Israelites Prior to the Rise of Islam (1924).

He was described as a brilliant editor and translator of Arabic works, as seen in The Letters of Abu'l-'Ala of Ma'arrat al-Nu'man (1898), Yaqut's Dictionary of Learned Men, 6 vol. (1907–27), and the chronicle of Miskawayh, prepared in collaboration with Henry Frederick Amedroz under the title The Eclipse of the 'Abbasid Caliphate, 7 vol. (1920–21).

He identified a business letter written in Judeo-Persian, found in Dandan Uiliq in Northwestern China in 1901, as dating from 718, and is the earliest evidence showing the presence of Jews in China.

He was a member of the council of the Royal Asiatic Society from 1905 onwards, its director in 1927, was awarded its triennial gold medal in 1928, and was its president 1934–37.

Egyptian Poet Laureate Ahmed Shawqi dedicated his famous poem, The Nile, to Margoliouth.

== Margoliouth on Pre-Islamic Arabic Poetry ==
In his Mohammed and the Rise of Islam, Margoliouth wrote: "The language of the Koran was thought by experts to bear a striking likeness to that of the early poetry: and though for us it is difficult to pass an opinion on this point, seeing that the early poetry is largely fabrication modelled on the Koran, we may accept the opinion of the Arabs."

In an article in the Encyclopaedia of Religion and Ethics, Margoliouth wrote: "The relation of this Qur'anic style to the verse and rhymed prose of classical Arabic is an enigma which cannot at present be solved."

== Personal life ==
Handwriting of Margoliouth (1930)

On 5 April 1896, Margoliouth married Jessie Payne Smith (1856–1933), daughter of Robert Payne Smith. Jessie was a Syriac scholar and campaigner for women's suffrage.

Margoliouth was ordained in the Church of England as a deacon and as a priest in 1899, during services at Liverpool Cathedral: this was unusual as the ordinations to the diaconate and priesthood normally occurred in successive years. He never held a parochial post, and instead his title was his fellowship at New College, Oxford. Additionally, from 1899 to 1903, he was an examining chaplain to the Bishop of Liverpool. He occasionally preached at Oxford churches. He belonged to the low church wing of the Church of England, and had according to the Oxford Dictionary of National Biography "extreme evangelistic tendencies".

== Publications ==
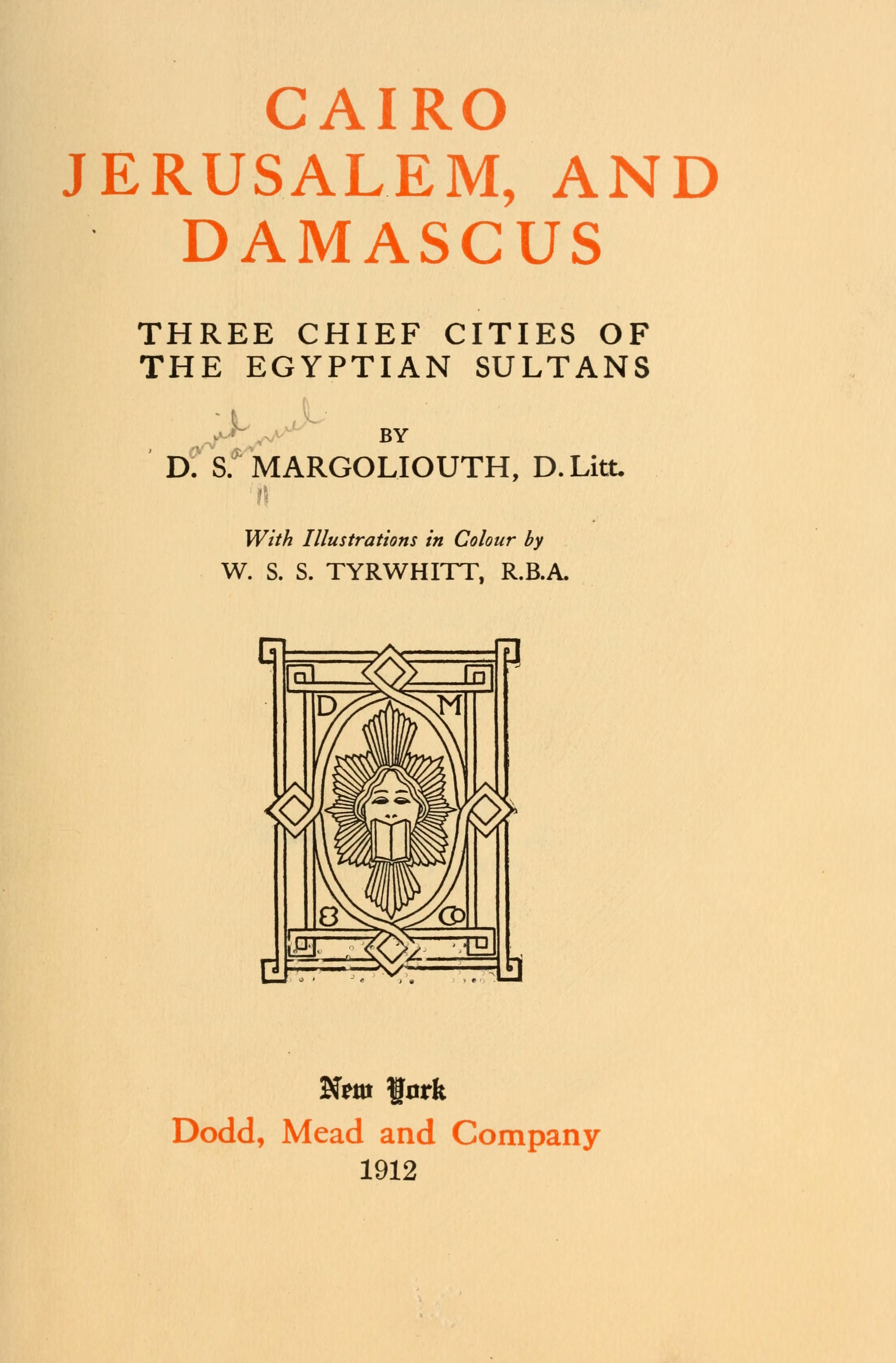
Cairo, Jerusalem, and Damascus, 1912

- Lines of Defence of the Biblical Revelation; Hodder and Stoughton, 1900; 2nd ed. 1901.
- Abu 'l-ʿAla al-Maʿarri's correspondence on vegetarianism, Journal of the Royal Asiatic Society, 1902, p. 289, by D. S. Margoliouth
- Mohammed and the Rise of Islam. New York and London: Putnam, 1905.
- "A poem attributed to Al-Samau’al." in: Journal of the Royal Asiatic Society. London, 1906
- Umayyads and 'Abbasids. 1907.
- The Early Development of Mohammedanism, London: Williams & Norgate, 1914.
- Irshad al-Arib ala Ma'rifat al-Adib of Yaqut al-Hamawi, (Yaqut's Dictionary of Learned Men); 7 vols., ("E. J. W. Gibb Memorial Series," Vol.VI.), Leiden, Brill, 1907–1927. (Arabic text) archive.org
- The Poetics of Aristotle; translated from Greek into English and from Arabic into Latin. (Hodder and Stoughton, 1911 ISBN 9789333679183)
- The Kitab al-Ansab of ʿAbd al-Karīm ibn Muḥammad al-Sam'ani. Leyden: E. J. Brill, 1912.
- Mohammedanism. London: Williams and Norgate, 1911. rev. ed. 1912
- The Table-talk of a Mesopotamian Judge. 2 vols. 1921–1922.
- The Eclipse of the Abbasid Caliphate. 1921.
- The Relations Between Arabs and Israelites Prior to the Rise of Islam. Schweich Lecture for 1921. 1924.
- Lectures on Arabic Historians, delivered before the University of Calcutta, February 1929. Byzantine series, 38. Calcutta, 1930 (later reprint: New York City: Burt Franklin).
- Catalogue of Arabic Papyri in the John Rylands Library, Manchester. Manchester, 1933

== See also ==
- Orientalism
