= Wyndham Knatchbull (Arabic scholar) =

Wyndham Knatchbull (1795 or 1796 – 5 April 1868) was a British clergyman and academic who was Laudian Professor of Arabic from 1823 until 1840.

Knatchbull, who was one of the sons of Sir Edward Knatchbull, 8th Baronet, was educated at Christ Church, Oxford, matriculating there on 7 November 1804 at the age of 18, and obtaining his Bachelor of Arts degree in 1808. He was elected to a Fellowship at All Souls College, Oxford in 1809, holding this position until 1824. He also obtained the further degrees of Master of Arts (1812), Bachelor of Divinity (1820) and Doctor of Divinity (1821). He was appointed Laudian Professor of Arabic in 1823, a post he retained until 1840. He was ordained, and held the posts of rector of Westbere, Kent, from 1811 onwards, and of Aldington, Smeeth and Hythe (also in Kent) from 1823 onwards, until his death on 5 April 1868.
