= Christopher Wren (priest) =

British priest

The Reverend Christopher Wren
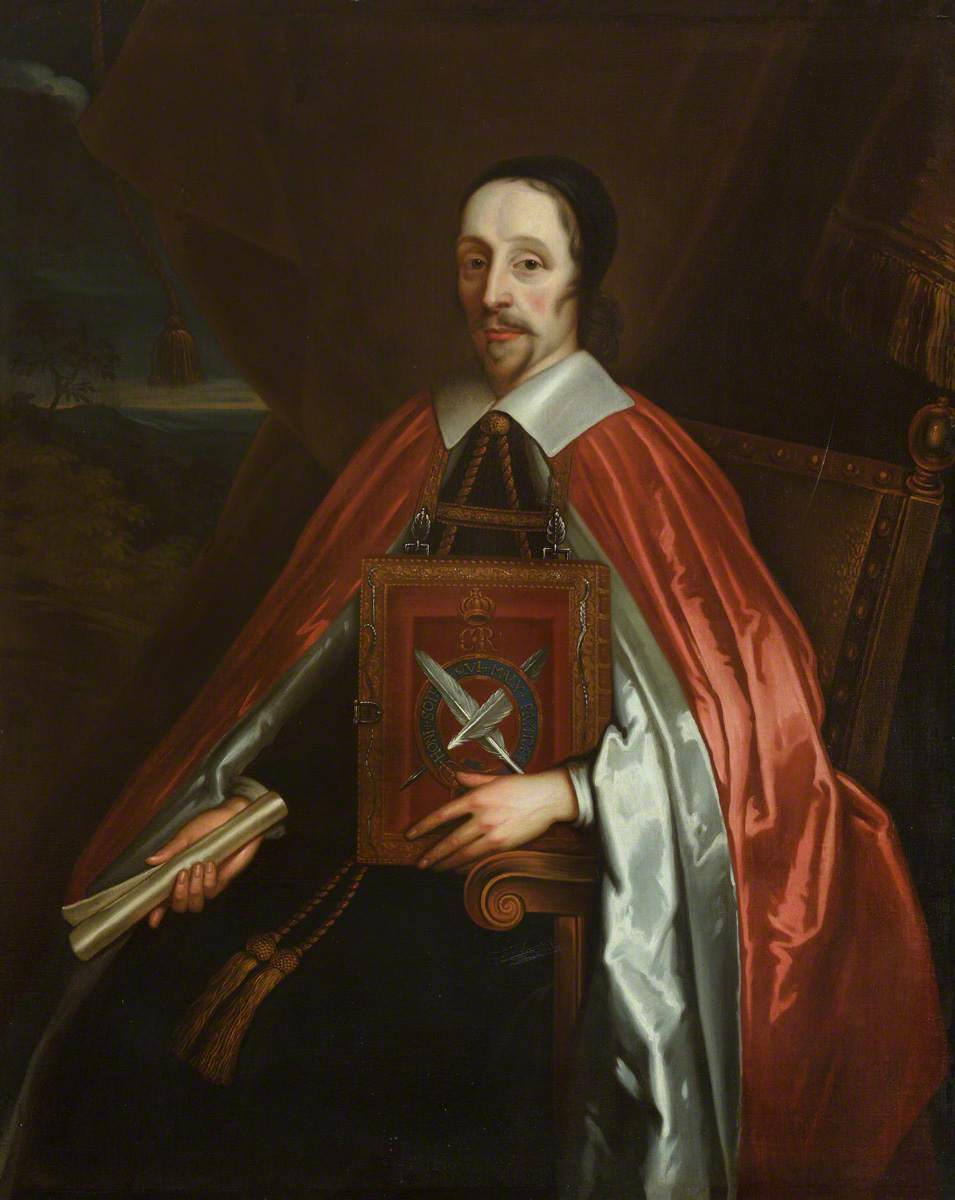
- Born: 17 September 1589; London, England
- Died: 29 May 1658; Bletchingdon, Oxfordshire, England
- Education: Merchant Taylors' School
- Spouse: Mary Cox (m. 1623)
- Children: 11, including Sir Christopher

Christopher Wren (17 September 1589 – 29 May 1658) was an English Anglican cleric who was Dean of Windsor from 1635 until his death, and the father of the prominent architect Christopher Wren.

== Career ==
Wren was educated at Merchant Taylors' School, London, and St John's College, Oxford and graduated BA in 1609, MA in 1613, BD in 1620. In 1630 he was created Doctor of Divinity at Peterhouse, Cambridge, where his brother Matthew was president.

Wren was appointed:

- Chaplain to Bishop Lancelot Andrewes
- Chaplain to King Charles I, 1628
- Rector of Fonthill Bishop, Wiltshire, 1620
- Rector of East Knoyle, Wiltshire, 1623
- Registrar of the Order of the Garter, 1634
- Dean of Wolverhampton, 1639
- Rector of Great Haseley, Oxfordshire, 1639

Wren was appointed Dean of Windsor in 1635. When Parliamentary forces occupied Windsor Castle, he refused to give to Captain Fogg the keys of St George's Chapel. On 23 October 1642 Fogg broke open the treasury and plundered it. Wren managed to preserve the records of the Order of the Garter, and King Edward III's sword.

Wren was the brother of the preceding Dean of Windsor, Matthew Wren. Christopher married Mary Cox. Their son was the famed architect Christopher Wren.
