= Samuel Turner (diplomat) =

English Asiatic traveller and diplomat

Samuel Turner (19 April 1759 – 2 January 1802) FRS was an English Asiatic traveller and a cousin of Warren Hastings, the first Governor of the Presidency of Fort William (Bengal).

== Early life ==
Turner was born in Gloucestershire, England.

== India and Tibet ==
After becoming a cadet with the East India Company (EIC) in 1780, Turner was subsequently promoted to ensign. Promotion followed to lieutenant on 8 August 1781 and to regimental captain on 18 March 1799. In February 1782, news having reached the headquarters of the EIC in Calcutta of the reincarnation of the Panchen Lama, Warren Hastings proposed despatching a mission to Tibet with a message of congratulation designed to strengthen the amicable relations established by George Bogle during his 1774 visit to Tibet. With the assent of the EIC Court of Directors, Turner was appointed chief of the Tibet mission on 9 January 1783 with fellow EIC employee and amateur artist Samuel Davis as "Draftsman and Surveyor". Following the route previously taken by Bogle, Turner arrived in Bhutan in June 1783 and stayed at the summer place of the Druk Desi, the country's ruler until 8 September. He then moved on to arrive at Shigatse in Tibet's Tsang Province on 22 September 1783 where an audience with the infant Panchen Lama followed on 4 December. Turner returned to the Governor-General's camp at Patna in 1784 where he reported that although unable to visit the Tibetan capital at Lhasa, he had received a promise that merchants sent to the country from India would be encouraged. For his efforts in Bhutan and Tibet, Turner received the sum of £500 from the EIC.

Turner served with distinction at the first Siege of Seringapatam in 1792 in command of a troop of Governor-General Lord Cornwallis' bodyguard of cavalry and later carried out a mission to the court of Tipu Sultan. He accumulated a large amount of wealth in India and after a spell as a captain in the EIC's 3rd European regiment he returned to Europe where he purchased a country seat in Gloucestershire.

On 15 January 1801 he was elected a fellow of the Royal Society then on 21 December the same year, while walking at night in the neighbourhood of Fetter Lane, London, he was seized with a paralytic stroke, and was taken to the workhouse in Shoe Lane. His name and address in St. James's Place were found; but he was too ill to be moved, and died on 2 January 1802. Buried in St James's Church, Piccadilly, his property in Gloucestershire went to his sisters, one of whom, Mary, married Joseph White, Regius Professor of Hebrew at the University of Oxford.

== Works ==
Turner was the author of An Account of an Embassy to the Court of the Teshoo Lama in Tibet, containing a Narrative of a Journey through Bootan and part of Tibet, which was published in London in 1800. A French translation published in Paris followed the same year followed by a German translation at Berlin and Hamburg the next year. The book was the first account of a visit to Tibet by a British author as the accounts of Bogle and Manning were not published until 1875.
