= John Wallis (Arabic scholar) =

John Wallis (1674 or 1675 – 28 January 1738) was Laudian Professor of Arabic at the University of Oxford from 1703 until his death.

Wallis matriculated at the University of Oxford as a member of Wadham College on 1 July 1691 at the age of 17. He became a demy (a scholar) of Magdalen College, Oxford, in 1693, obtaining his Bachelor of Arts degree in 1695, his Master of Arts degree in 1698 and his Bachelor of Divinity degree in 1709. He was appointed as a Fellow of Magdalen College in 1703, holding this post until 1717. He was also appointed as Laudian Professor of Arabic in 1703. He was rector of Aythorpe Roding in Essex between 1707 and 1708, vicar of East Worldham, Hampshire, between 1713 and 1718, and rector of Everleigh, Wiltshire, from 1716 onwards. He died on 28 January 1738.
