= St Mary's Church, East Knoyle =

England parish church in East Knoyle, Wiltshire

Coordinates: 51°04′26″N 2°10′21″W

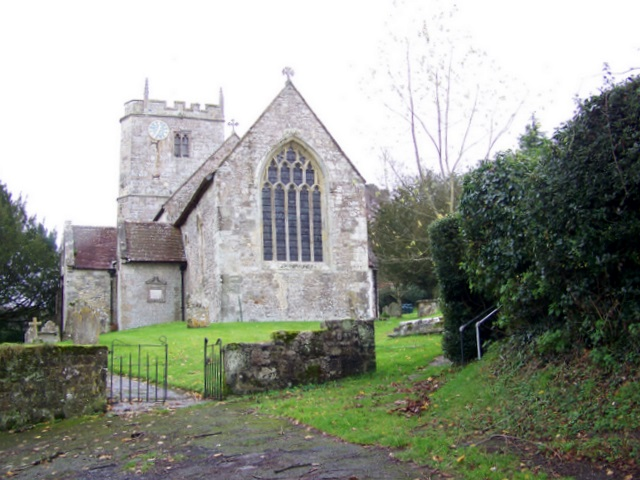
St Mary's Church, East Knoyle

St Mary's Church is a Church of England parish church in East Knoyle, Wiltshire, England.

== History ==
The Church of England Parish Church of St Mary was begun before the 1066 conquest. Pevsner described its chancel as "Norman in its bones" and wrote that its 17th-century plaster decoration, a "surprise and delight", "ought to be the purpose of a visit from every Wiltshire tourist".

The church was extended in the 13th, 14th, and 15th centuries, with a large tower added in the 15th century. Plasterwork in the chancel depicting biblical scenes was designed in about 1639 by Dean Christopher Wren. Five of the six bells are from the 18th century. The building was further extended in the 19th century, along with restoration in 1845 by Wyatt and Brandon, and interior alterations in 1875-6 by Sir Arthur Blomfield.

The church was declared Grade I listed in 1966. Since 2008, the ecclesiastical parish forms part of the benefice of St Bartholomew, a group of six parishes.

St Mary's had a chapelry at Hindon from the 13th century. Hindon became a separate vicarage in 1869.

== Notable rectors ==
Christopher Wren (1589–1658) was rector of East Knoyle from 1623. He married Mary Cox, daughter of Richard Cox of Fonthill Bishop. Their children were all born at the parsonage house, including in 1632 Christopher, who would become a prominent architect. After Christopher senior was appointed Dean of Windsor in 1635, the family spent part of each year there.
