= Matthew Burt =

English furniture designer (born 1951)

Matthew Burt (born 1951) is a British furniture designer-maker who runs a contemporary practice from a studio and workshop (established 1978) based in the South Wiltshire village of Hindon, west of Salisbury. His work has been displayed in significant public exhibitions, most notably in the OneTree touring show and at the House of Commons in 2008 in a selection of work intended to raise the profile of UK furniture making. Burt's workshop steadily built on a reputation for furniture design that allies structurally robust work that fulfils its function with a lean, elegant line and the occasional bravura surface. Burt has said that he regards the 'intermingling of science, engineering, mathematics, aesthetics and metaphorics' as the building blocks for his furniture.

Burt has a workshop on the outskirts of the Wiltshire village of Hindon, and a separate gallery on the village's High Street.

== Early life ==
Born in 1951 in Wiltshire, Burt read Zoology at Reading University before studying furniture at Rycotewood College, Oxfordshire and then working as an apprentice to Richard Fyson in Gloucestershire. He established his own workshop in Wiltshire in 1978.

== Materials and design ==
His degree in Zoology fed Burt's inquisitive interest in the substructure of the natural world and he applied this interest in an innovative way to his earliest designs for furniture, sensing that the practical framework of his pieces could add both purpose and meaning to his designs. Crafts magazine wrote in 2008: "Furniture maker Matthew Burt has a refreshingly no-nonsense approach to his work. He is a real maker’s maker with no time for conceptual craft and his love of what he calls the ‘magic that is making’ can be clearly seen in his current exhibition at Farnham's Crafts Study Centre."

Taking an approach of simplicity and honesty to his chosen materials (in the main, sustainable sources of English woods such as ash, oak, maple, cherry, sycamore, elm and walnut), Burt began his career designing within the idiom of Arts and Crafts furniture but adding contemporary notes such as elegantly bevelled edges and subtly cut-out sections to the top of tapered legs. His designs began to lose weight and added curves. He sought a playful contrast between restraint and elaboration, always aiming at technical perfection, in the manner of the designer-maker Alan Peters.

== Major works ==
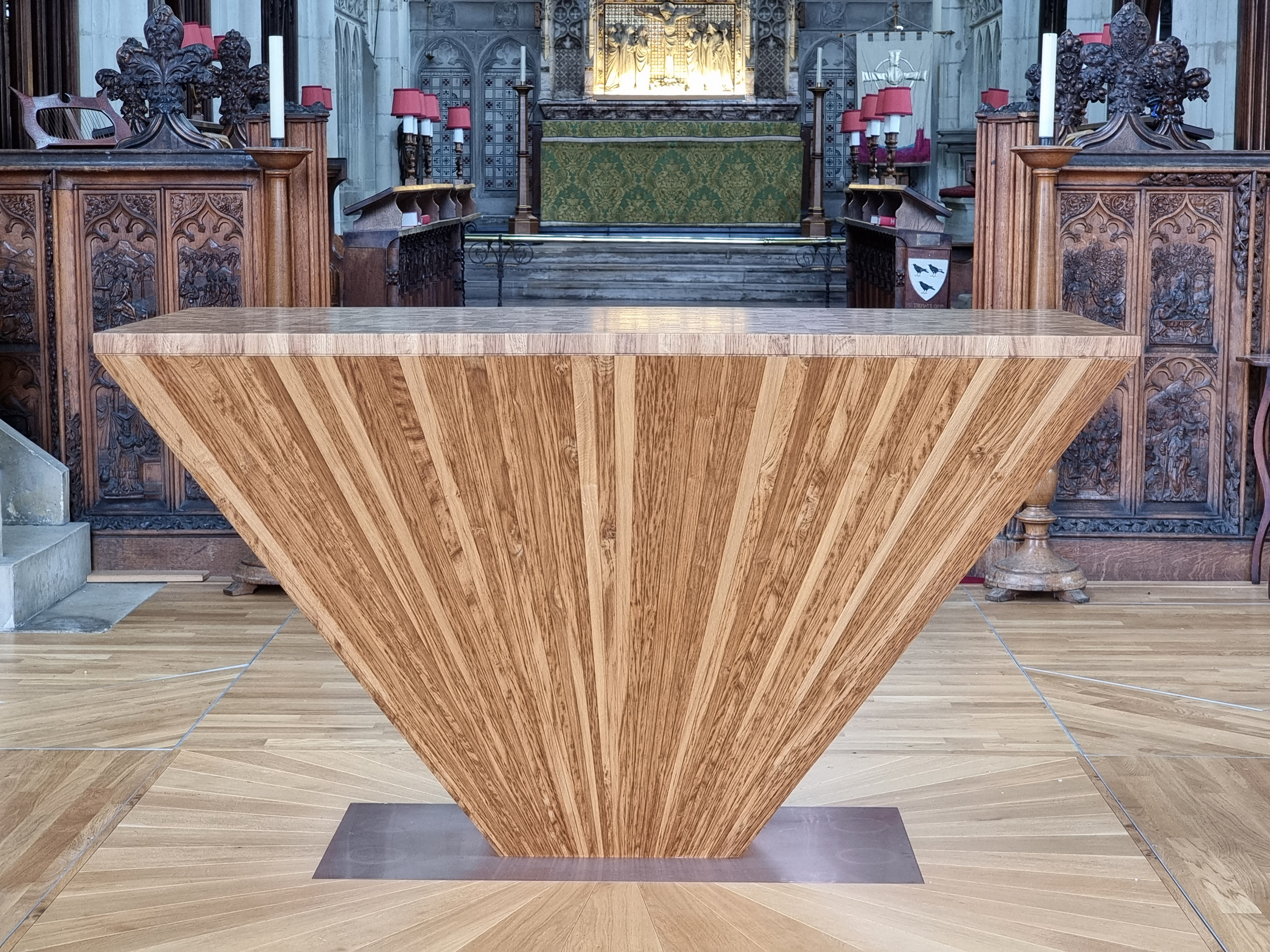
Altar for St Thomas's Church, Salisbury (2020

Burt works to commission, although he has also designed pieces such as garden benches or public seating that can be made to order as 'standard' ranges. Some of his early commissions emphasised the playful dexterity of making wood do seemingly impossible things. A chair for an annual competition run by the arts development agency Southern Arts carried this exuberance to extremes, responding to a brief set by the organisation's literature development officer to design and make a chair that has wit and speaks of its interest. Burt forced the idea of the essential framework or 'exo-skeleton' of a piece of furniture to the furthest point in his Ruminative Chair (1989) made of wych elm, lives in Macclesfield, English elm, burr elm and sycamore, replete with a floating seat pad, twisted stems, inlays, and moveable balls set at the ends of the arms, in a gothic-like seat. The chair was intended to make the impossible look plausible.This chair is about as close to postmodernism as Burt allows himself to get. He has focused more recently on a cleanliness of line and, sometimes, a subtle and sinuous curve (for example in the complex edge of his Leaf Table (2007) or the Pyramalised dresser 1. These designs combine dexterity of hand skill with the advances made possible by computer assisted drawing technology. In Burt's view, using sophisticated equipment as a means of advancing practice is both plausible and efficient. He may find a wistful and reflective admiration for the honest toil and tools of the Arts and Crafts furniture makers, but his work has to survive in a challenging contemporary marketplace, and the high prices that are charged for this commissioned work necessarily take into account high labour and studio costs as well as the intensive design and fitting stages of complex pieces for sometimes mercurial clients. Good Woodworking magazine wrote: "Today Matthew Burt is a recognised and well-respected brand, known for creating furniture that is neither gratuitously experimental or stagnantly nostalgic."

The combination of clarity and complexity in Burt's furniture was expressed in his award-winning Cantilevered Table, exhibited in the influential One Tree exhibition. Burt explained that this piece was "seemingly simple… relying on the intrinsic strength of the oak to span a long unsupported surface…’v-grooved' to communicate the sensual and tactile delights of wood."

Burt's Finback Chair is one in a series of elm chairs (a sequence in his 'elegy for the elm') with graceful, handmade lines accentuating its individual poise and functionality. There is a pair in the permanent collection of the Fitzwilliam Museum, Cambridge.

His altar installed in St Thomas's Church, Salisbury in 2020 consists of 1,152 tapered pieces of English oak.

== Museum benches ==
Burt has placed a special emphasis on making public seating for museums and galleries, starting with café seats to accompany his tables for the Russell-Cotes Art Gallery & Museum, Bournemouth in 2001. This commission gave him the chance to reflect on a strategy for engagement with the museum sector: he would not rely alone on a museum acquiring a work for the collection; he would seek opportunities to place his work within the body of the museum where it could be both admired and used. This would be a living body of work in the public realm of the gallery.

His first museum bench was commissioned by the Crafts Study Centre in 2004 and complemented practical furniture there such as showcases and desks as well as later commissions (a side table and leaflet holder). The three-seat oak bench utilised a solid form with decorative relief added through square end grain blocks for the legs.

The design was carefully evolved in response to a public competition for museum seating announced by the Ashmolean Museum of Art and Archaeology in 2009. Burt has now made over 20 benches utilising a subtly slender aerofoil cross-section matched to end grain blocked ends It is his most extensive museum project to date. The benches suit the galleries of the original building with as much grace and purpose as the modernist extension by Rick Mather, and the ability to tie together the public spaces was an important part of the commission. There is a new element to three benches commissioned in September 2011 for the Egyptian Galleries (and installed in November) with a subtle change of configuration of the seat to the leg, with its 'flare' as Burt says 'more referentially apposite' to the tenor and the subject of the spaces. These benches are made from Herefordshire oak.

The bench design underwent a finely-judged evolution in response to a competition announced by the National Museum of Wales, Cardiff in December 2010. The particular context of the commission is described by Oliver Fairclough, Keeper of Art:

‘During the last hundred years, the National Museum of Wales has commissioned several suites of oak gallery furniture for the galleries of its fine Beaux Arts classical building which was begun in 1912. The upper floor of the building’s west wing was redeveloped in 2010–11 to provide 800 square metres of galleries for recent and contemporary art, and these presented a particular challenge as they contained rooms of both the 1920s and 60s with differing proportions. Following an invitation to a shortlist of designers for proposals, Matthew Burt was invited to develop a new suite of bench seats. These continue the use of oak – from a local and sustainable source – and are deceptively simple in their appearance. Their narrow rectangular form, echoing their setting, is off-set by the subtly convex line of the seat top, and relieved by a lightly curved upstand which is placed off-centre. The seats complement the spaces beautifully, and have been both well-used and widely admired since these galleries opened in July 2011.

Burt was approached by The Courtauld Gallery, London in January 2011 and commissioned to make benches throughout the rooms. He changed his approach incrementally to this commission to respond directly to the spaces and their differing collections (including major Impressionist paintings as well as highly elaborate 18th century furniture). Burt played on his theme of practical strength and understated line to create strong forms of a larger scale than hitherto using tigered oak. In these benches, as Burt remarks, ‘their bellied curves give a greater sensuality’ and the long grain legs have a mitred joint to the seats.

== Collections, commissions and honours ==
- Permanent collection of the Fitzwilliam Museum, Cambridge.
- Permanent collection of Crafts Study Centre, University for the Creative Arts.
- Public gallery seating for the Ashmolean Museum, Oxford.
- Private commissions for McLaren Group, the Institute of Directors, Balliol College and the offices of the Vice-Chancellor and Deputy Vice-Chancellor, University for the Creative Arts.
- Fellow of Royal Society of Arts.
- Member of the Devon Guild of Craftsmen.
- Fellow of the Society of Designer Craftsmen.
- Awarded the Master's Gold Award by the Worshipful Company of Furniture Makers in 2001.
