= Samuel Green (organ builder) =

English organ builder (1740–1796)

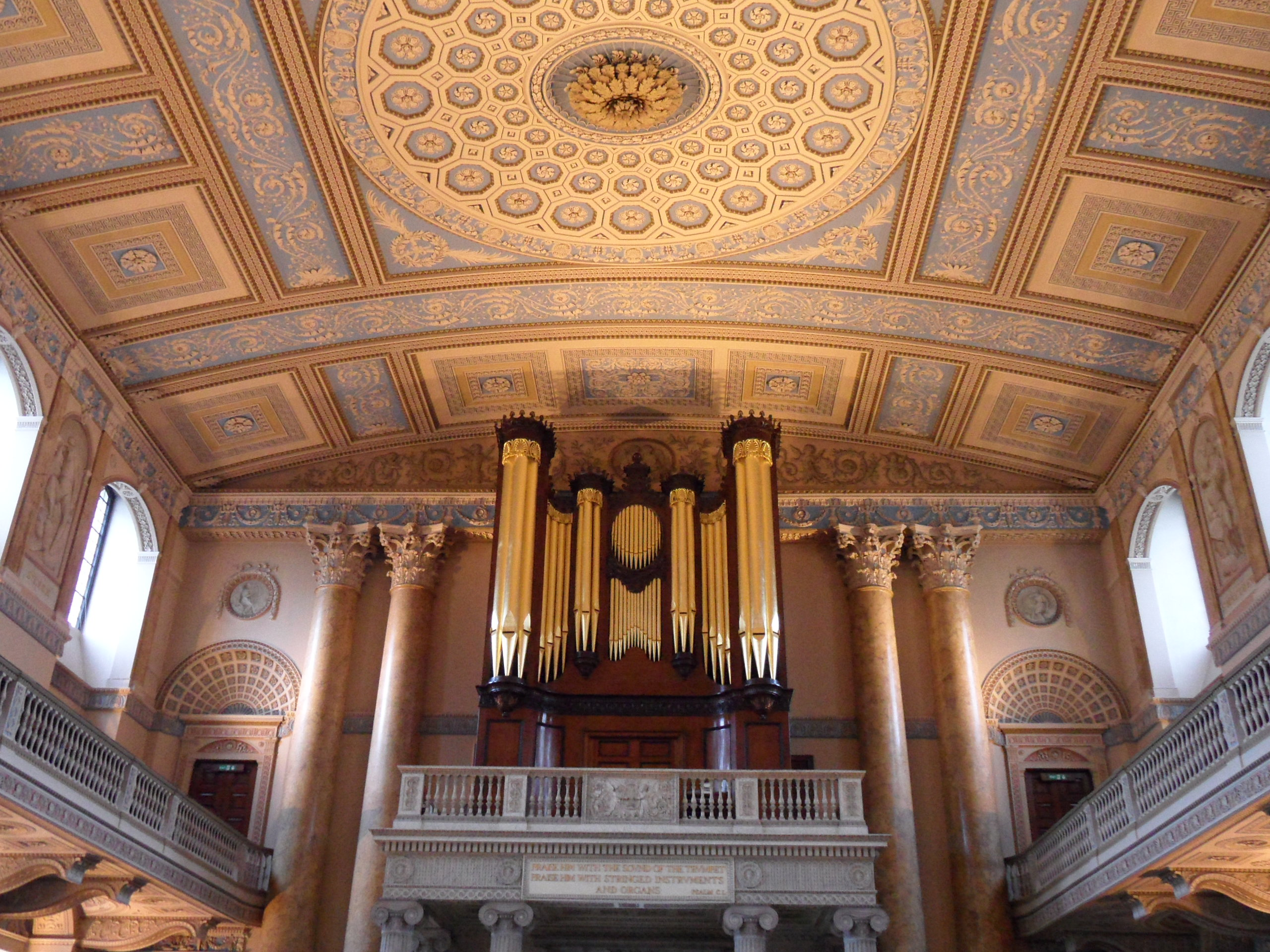
Old Royal Naval College Chapel of Saint Peter and Saint Paul in Greenwich, London

Samuel Green (1740–1796) was an English organ builder.

Green learnt his art under the elder John Byfield, Richard Bridge, and Abraham Jordan, and afterwards entered into several years' partnership with the younger Byfield. Green built a large number of organs for the cathedrals and churches in London and the country, instruments which were famed for their beauty of tone. Green died in near poverty at Isleworth, Middlesex, 14 September 1796, leaving his business to his widow.

An organ built by Green was presented to Salisbury Cathedral by George III in 1792, and transferred to St Thomas's Church in that city in 1877.
