= Orange Way =

Long-distance walk in England

Coordinates: 50°23′45.35″N 3°30′45.59″W

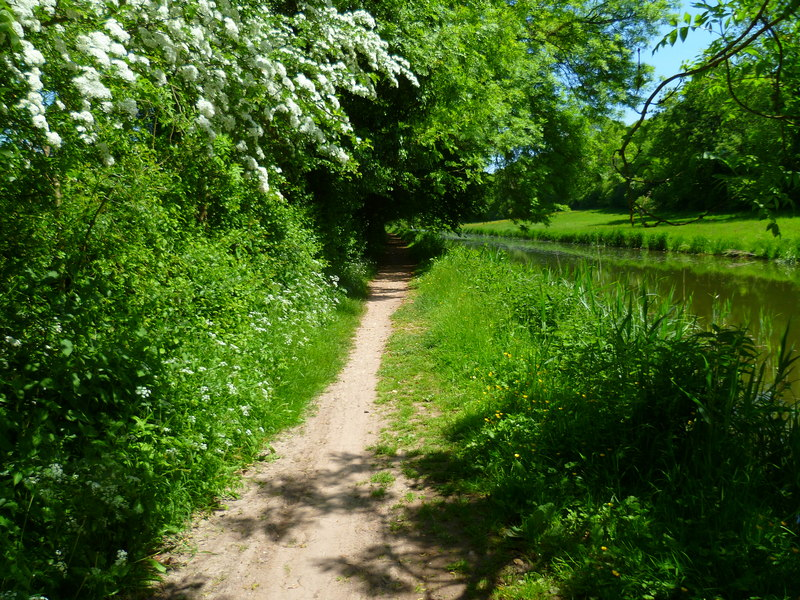
West of Newbury, Berkshire, the Orange Way follows the Kennet and Avon Canal towpath

The Orange Way, so called because it follows the march in 1688 of Prince William of Orange and his army from Brixham to London, is a 350 miles (560 km) unofficial long-distance walk in England that passes through Devon, Dorset, Wiltshire, Berkshire, Buckinghamshire and London.

== Suggested route ==
- Day 1 Brixham to Berry Pomeroy – 10.5 miles
- Day 2 Berry Pomeroy to Chudleigh – 18 miles
- Day 3 Chudleigh to Exeter – 16 miles
- Day 4 Exeter to Woodbury – 9.5 miles
- Day 5 Woodbury to Honiton – 19 miles
- Day 6 Honiton to Axminster – 10.5 miles
- Day 7 Axminster to Beaminster – 17.5 miles
- Day 8 Beaminster to East Coker – 15 miles
- Day 9 East Coker to Goathill – 11 miles
- Day 10 Goathill to Wincanton – 15.5 miles
- Day 11 Wincanton to Hindon – 15 miles
- Day 12 Hindon to Salisbury – 19 miles
- Day 13 Salisbury to Amesbury – 10 miles
- Day 14 Amesbury to Everleigh – 14 miles
- Day 15 Everleigh to Burbage – 8 miles
- Day 16 Burbage to Hungerford – 16 miles
- Day 17 Hungerford to Chieveley – 14.5 miles
- Day 18 Chieveley to Abingdon – 19 miles
- Day 19 Abingdon to Wallingford – 13.5 miles
- Day 20 Wallingford to Whitchurch – 11 miles
- Day 21 Whitchurch to Henley – 16 miles
- Day 22 Henley to Marlow – 9 miles
- Day 23 Marlow to Windsor – 14 miles
- Day 24 Windsor to Brentford – 16 miles
- Day 25 Brentford to St James's Palace, London – 13 miles
