= Hindon, Wiltshire =

Village in Wiltshire, England

Coordinates: 51.095°N 2.130°W

Hindon
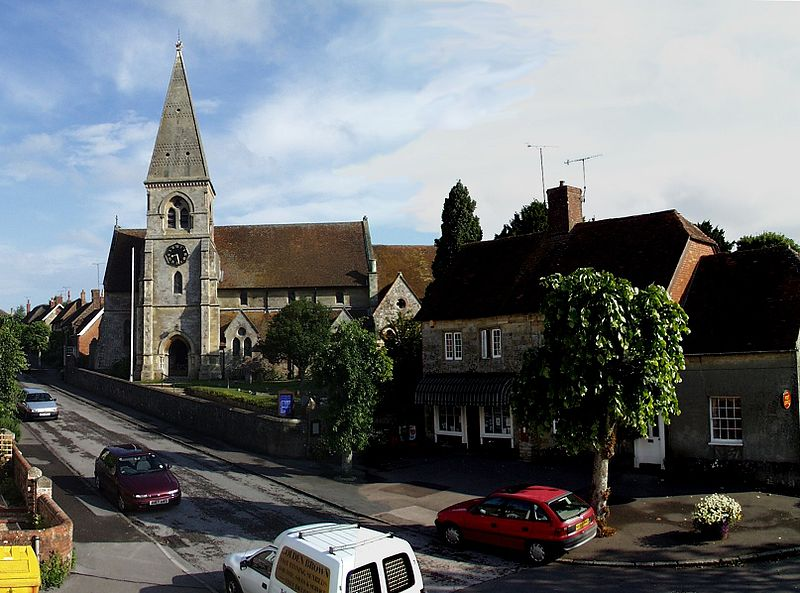
- St John the Baptist Church

- Location within Wiltshire
- Population: 485 (in 2011)
- OS grid reference: ST910329
- Civil parish: Hindon
- Unitary authority: Wiltshire
- Ceremonial county: Wiltshire
- Region: South West
- Country: England
- Sovereign state: United Kingdom
- Post town: Salisbury
- Postcode district: SP3
- Dialling code: 01747
- Police: Wiltshire
- Fire: Dorset and Wiltshire
- Ambulance: South Western
- UK Parliament: Salisbury
- Website: Village

Hindon is a village and civil parish in Wiltshire, England, about 16 miles (26 km) west of Salisbury and 9.6 miles (15.4 km) south of Warminster. It is in the Cranborne Chase and West Wiltshire Downs Area of Outstanding Natural Beauty. Hindon was a market town but is now a village.

== History ==
Hindon is a planned settlement, unlike most English villages which have evolved piecemeal over the millennia. If previous settlement in the area was present, no evidence within the village itself has yet been discovered. There are prehistoric field systems and Bronze Age round barrows on the downs nearby.

According to the Estates' Account Rolls of the Bishop of Winchester, Bishop Peter des Roches of Winchester planned the borough as a centre for markets and fairs in 1218; at that time the land was part of East Knoyle parish. The main period of building was between 1218 and 1220 and even today, the medieval settlement pattern can be seen: the main tenements flanked either side of the High Street, with narrow burgage plots running behind the buildings. By c. 1250 there were some 150 houses in the village. There were 77 poll-tax payers in 1377. Hindon became a parliamentary borough (see Hindon constituency) in the later Middle Ages, and continued to return two members until it was disenfranchised in 1832; it was reckoned to be an exceptionally corrupt borough even by the standards of the time, a so-called 'rotten borough'. Its central position in south-west Wiltshire made it a centre of local government: between 1530 and 1660 it was sometimes a venue for quarter sessions and in 1786 was made the centre of a petty sessional division.

Hindon's prosperity was due to its markets and fairs, and its position on and near main roads. Almost immediately after the foundation of the village in 1218 a weekly market was held and this continued for centuries: Hindon was noted for its market in the mid and late 16th century. As a corn market (cereals: wheat, barley and oats) it was rated by John Aubrey as second only to Warminster in c. 1650, and in c. 1707 it was coupled with Chippenham as a great Wiltshire market. In the 19th century the sale of pigs and sheep comprised a sizeable share of the market business, but by the later 19th century the market declined rapidly, and finally ceased in the early 1880s.

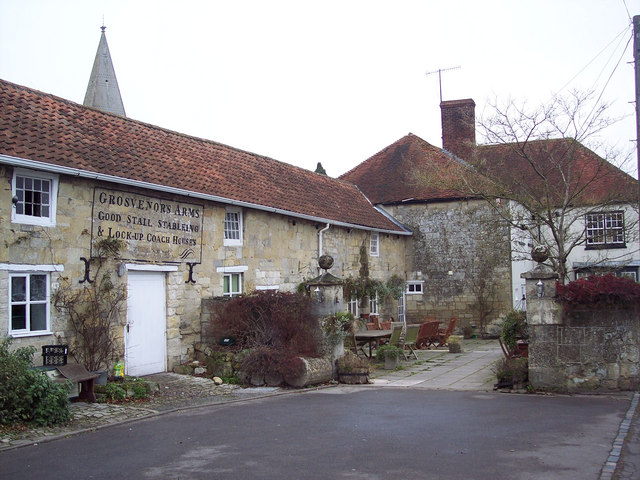
Stabling at the Grosvenor Arms (once the Angel Inn), an old coaching inn in Hindon

Coaching was probably the major industry in the village in the 18th century and early 19th century. The main London-Exeter road ran across the downs, and in 1754 there were fourteen inns and public houses in the village, with associated stabling for the horses. Such was the vitality of Hindon that it quickly recovered after the disastrous fire of 1754. In 1801 the population was 793. In 1830 London coaches from Exeter left daily from the Swan and from Barnstaple nightly from the Lamb Inn, and there were corresponding services westwards. Stabling can still be seen at the Grosvenor Arms (also known at various times in its history as the Angel Inn): the exterior of the stable block facing Angel Lane bears a text which reads: GROSVENORS ARMS GOOD STALL STABLEING [sic] AND LOCK-UP COACH HOUSES. The population of the village reached a peak of 921 in 1831 when there were some 190 houses.

Other trades undertaken in the village over the centuries include weaving, linen and tick-weaving, silk twist manufacture, inn-keeping, baking, brewing, clock-making, gunpowder manufacture, and wood, metal and leather working.

A school was built on the east side of the village in the 1850s, at the expense of Lady Octavia Shaw-Stewart. Children of all ages attended until 1961, when those aged 11 transferred elsewhere.

Several reasons for Hindon's decline have been put forward: its disenfranchisement in 1832; the railway connection of London to Taunton and Exeter in the 1840s which reduced coach traffic significantly (coupled with the opening of the station at Tisbury, 2 miles (3.2 km) southeast of Hindon, in 1859); and a general decrease in road traffic. By 1875 all but two of Hindon's inns were closed down.

The High Street was lined with trees in 1863. These still remain, mostly lime but with a few oak trees. The trees are pollarded annually, giving the wide straight village street an almost French look.

Hindon is mentioned in A Shepherd's Life: Impressions of the South Wiltshire Downs by W. H. Hudson, published in 1910. Hudson stayed in the Lamb Inn in the spring and summer of 1909. Chapter 16 of the book concerns Hindon, in which Hudson describes the village thus: 'Hindon is a delightful little village, so rustic and pretty amidst its green, swelling downs ... its last state, sober and purified, is very much better than the old. For although sober, it is contented and even merry, and exhibits such a sweet friendliness toward the stranger within its gates as to make him remember it with pleasure and gratitude.' He relates stories about Hindon's social and natural history.

== Religion ==
A chapel was built when Hindon was founded, but was almost certainly closed by the later 14th century. In 1405 it was refounded and partially rebuilt. In 1650 it was recommended that Hindon should become a parish, but it remained a chapelry of the parish church of St Mary, East Knoyle. Until 1869 there was no right of marriage in the chapel, although inhabitants could be baptised and buried there.

In 1804 the church (known as the Free Chapel) comprised a nave and chancel with a south tower, the lower part of which served as a porch. The tower and possibly part of the nave and chancel dated from the 12th century, while the west doorway and window and a south window of the nave were later medieval. In 1836 the church was enlarged: a north aisle was added, as well as a window in the nave; by 1864 marriages were being performed in the church. However, this incarnation of the church was short-lived. Parish status was assigned in 1869 and in November of that same year the Free Chapel was demolished, along with a few adjacent buildings, to make way for a new church. By July 1871, construction was completed, and the new parish church of St John the Baptist, designed by T. H. Wyatt, was consecrated. This survives largely unaltered.

There is a strong tradition of non-conformity in the West Country, and Hindon was no exception. In 1787 a dwelling-house was certified for Independents, and in 1810 a Congregational church was built at nearby Fonthill Gifford. In 1836 a room in Hindon was certified for Primitive Methodists and five years later the Providence Chapel was built for them behind the south side of the High Street. In 1896 that chapel was replaced by one on the north side of the street, where it still stands, although now converted into a private dwelling.

== The Great Fire of Hindon, 1754 ==
On 2 July 1754, a large fire swept through the village, burning 144 houses and buildings to the ground. Charitable donations from across the south of England helped in the process of rebuilding.

== Present day ==
The primary school, Hindon Church of England Voluntary Aided Primary School, merged with the school at East Knoyle (leading to closure of the East Knoyle site) in 1984 and later became a Voluntary Aided school. Brambles Outdoor Nursery School in the village is a nursery school for children aged 2–5.

The village has a community shop and post office, a dispensing GP surgery, and a social club with function room and skittle alley. It has two pubs: The Grosvenor Arms (which has also been called The Angel at various points in its history) and The Lamb.

Every May Hindon has exhibitors in the annual Wylye Valley Art Trail. In 2025, 15 artists took part in the village, including potters, painters, jewellers and woodworkers, with Matthew Burt among their number.

Three long-distance footpaths pass through Hindon: the Wessex Ridgeway, Monarch's Way and Orange Way.

In September 2022 Hindon won the 'Best Kept Medium Village' award in the Campaign to Protect Rural England's (CPRE) Wiltshire best-kept village competition.

In September 2024 Hindon was listed by The Sunday Times as one of the UK's "20 best secret villages to live in".

== Notable people ==
- Henrietta Scott, Countess of Dalkeith (c. 1677–30 May 1730), born in Hindon.
- 'Monk' Lewis (1775–1818), Gothic novelist, MP for Hindon from 1796 to 1802.
- Tony Streather (1926–2018), Army officer and mountaineer, the first man to climb two peaks higher than 25,000 ft, retired to Hindon.
- Ruth Gee (1955- ), born in Hindon, President of the Methodist Conference in 2013-14.

== Sources ==
- Beresford, Maurice W, 'Six New Towns of the Bishop of Winchester', Medieval Archaeology 3, pages 200–202 (1959)
- Beresford, Maurice W, New Towns of the Middle Ages, Lutterworth Press (1967)
- Sheard, Norah, The History of Hindon, printed by The Shaston Printers Ltd, Shaftesbury, Dorset, UK (1979)
- Dewhurst, Richard, The Church in Hindon, Hindon: Hindon Publishing (2000)
- Dewhurst, Richard, Crosstracks to Hindon, Salisbury: The Hobnob Press (2005)
