= Stephen Reay =

19th-century Scottish academic and clergyman

Stephen Reay (29 March 1782 – 20 January 1861) was a Scottish academic and clergyman, who was Laudian Professor of Arabic from 1840 until his death.

== Life ==
Reay was the only child of a Scottish clergyman, John Reay, and was born in Montrose, Angus, on 29 March 1782, which was Good Friday. He studied at the University of Edinburgh with the philosopher Dugald Stewart, graduating in 1802. He was ordained at Chester Cathedral in 1806 before serving as a curate in Shotwick, Cheshire, and then in Haslingden, Lancashire, where he met Eleonara Hargreave, who he later married. He studied at the University of Oxford, matriculating at St Alban Hall, Oxford in 1814, obtaining a Bachelor of Arts degree in 1817, his Master of Arts degree in 1823 and his Bachelor of Divinity degree in 1841. He acted as Vice-Principal of St Alban Hall for some years, and was appointed Laudian Professor of Arabic in 1840. He published little, although contemporaries praised his scholarship. He wrote a pamphlet, "Observations on the defence of the Church Missionary Society against the objections of the Archdeacon of Bath" (1818) under the pseudonym "Pileus Quadratus", and edited two texts, Narratio de Josepho e sacro codice (1822) and Textus Hebraicus (1840).

Reay was appointed Under-Librarian at the Bodleian Library in 1828 by Bulkeley Bandinel, the university librarian. He was in charge of oriental books. Reay held the professorship until his death, and remained at the Bodleian until retiring with a pension in 1860. Colleagues at the library fondly remembered "his habits of pottering around the library in search of his spectacles and hovering over hot-air gratings in search of warmth". He was also curate for a time of the church of St Peter-le-Bailey, Oxford.

He was remembered for his "kindness of heart and courtesy of manner", and was described in an obituary as "a most genuine Christian character" and one who was "never heard to utter an unkind word of anybody". His health declined in his later years and he died on 20 February 1861, 19 days after his wife. He was buried in St Sepulchre's Cemetery, Oxford, alongside his wife.
