= St Thomas's Church, Salisbury =

Coordinates: 51.069020°N 1.796831°W

St Thomas's Church
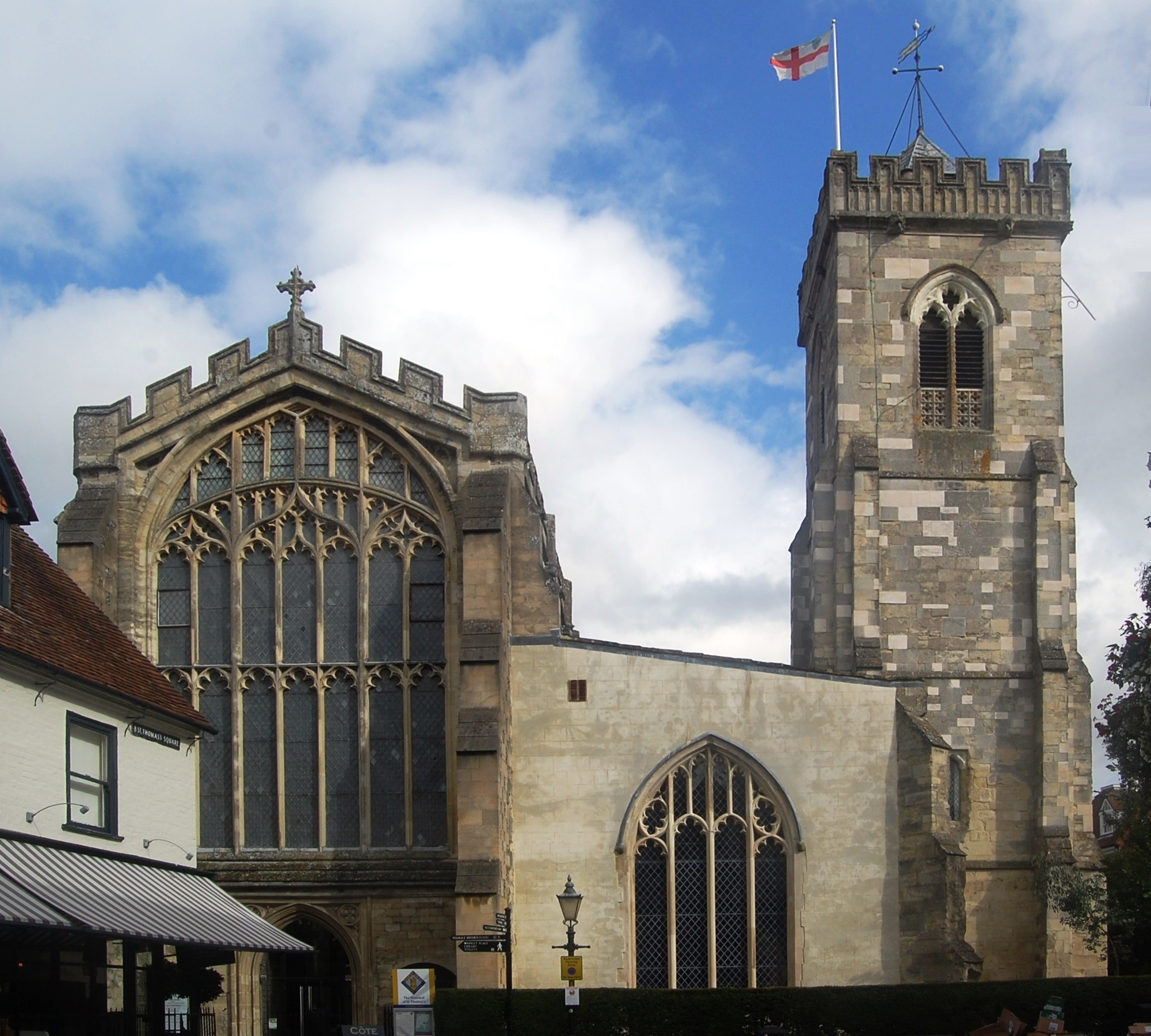
- The west end of St Thomas's Church in September 2019

- Location in Wiltshire
- OS grid reference: SU 14332 29985
- Location: St Thomas's Square, Salisbury, Wiltshire
- Country: England
- Denomination: Anglican
- Previous denomination: Roman Catholic
- Website: www.stthomassalisbury.co.uk

History
- Status: Parish church
- Dedication: Saint Thomas of Canterbury

Architecture
- Functional status: Active
- Years built: Founded 1220, rebuilt 15th century

Administration
- Province: Canterbury
- Diocese: Salisbury
- Archdeaconry: Sarum
- Deanery: Salisbury
- Parish: Salisbury St Thomas and St Edmund

Listed Building – Grade I
- Reference no.: 1273123

St Thomas's Church is a Church of England parish church in central Salisbury, Wiltshire, England. The church was founded in the early 13th century and rebuilt in the 15th century at the expense of the city's prosperous merchants. Above the chancel arch is a large doom painting from the late 15th century or early 16th. The building is Grade I listed.

== Location ==
St Thomas's Church stands just west of the city's market place. The street leading from the north gate of the cathedral close to St Thomas's churchyard was laid out when the cathedral was built in the 13th century, and gained the name High Street in the 14th century.

== History and architecture ==
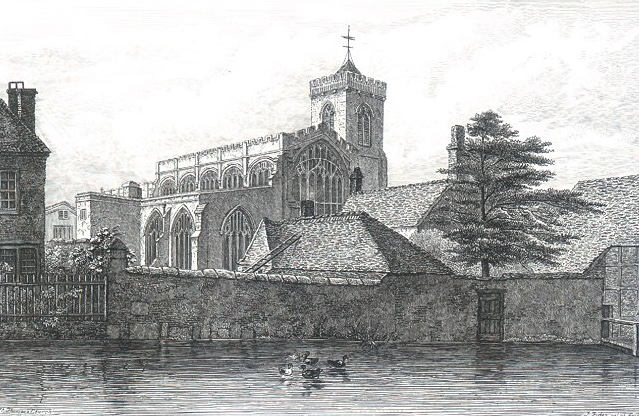
St Thomas’s Church, from the river, about 1834

The first church on the site is thought to be a small wooden chapel built c.1219 by Bishop Poore as a place of worship for those working on the site of the new cathedral. This was soon replaced by a stone building, which by 1238 was dedicated to St Thomas of Canterbury. The church had its own parish by 1246.

The tower, with porch below, was added on the south side of the church in the early years of the 15th century. Construction of a stone spire was abandoned when the tower began to lean, and instead the tower was capped later that century, by a pyramid roof and battlements. There are eight bells, the oldest cast by Abraham Rudhall in 1716, and the others by Robert Wells of Aldbourne in 1771.

In 1447 the chancel collapsed, leading to extensive rebuilding and enlargement; a fragment of 13th-century masonry remains at the west end of the south arcade of the chancel. The replacement chancel was longer and higher and was partly paid for by Salisbury's merchants, among them William Swayne who was three times mayor of the city. The chancel aisles were also rebuilt, and Swayne provided a chantry chapel in the south aisle (now the Lady Chapel). On the north side the Godmanstone and Hungerford families provided the north-east chapel, and Swain built a house for chantry priests (now the vestry) beyond it.

In the 1470s, the nave arcades were replaced, the aisles rebuilt and a clerestory added under a new roof. The resulting nave is called "wonderfully light" by Julian Orbach. The 15th-century roofs are embellished with carving and many figures of angels; Orbach calls the nave roof "ornate and dainty". The great west window is from the same period. The whole has a footprint of 1147 square metres, placing it among the largest churches in Wiltshire.

The tower has an east-facing clock, with a pair of quarter-jacks – wooden figures holding halberds which appear to strike the bells. They were installed in 1581, at the same time as the quarter bells, although the present figures date from the late 17th to late 18th century.

== Interior ==
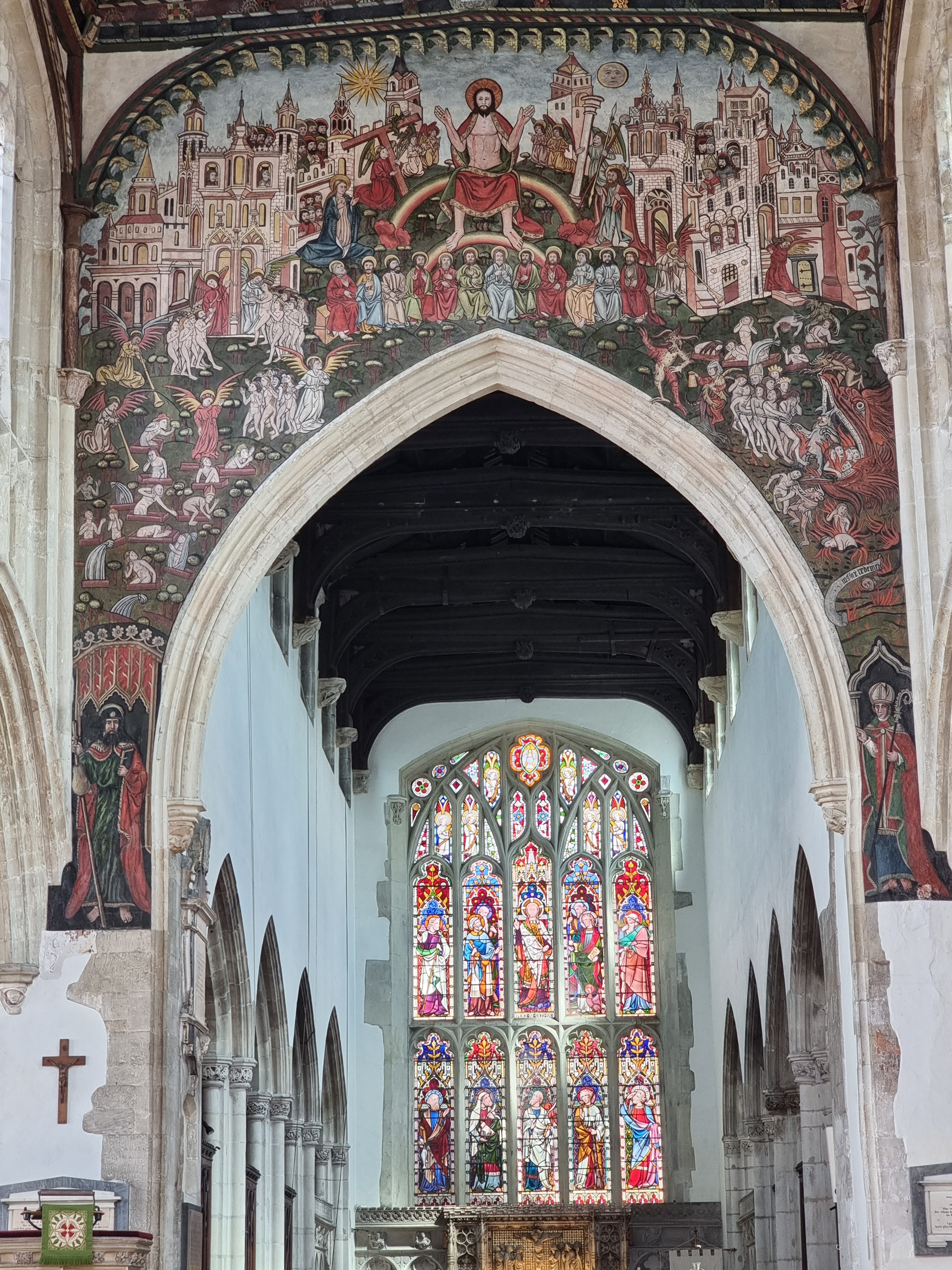
The doom painting in 2021

Nikolaus Pevsner called the interior of the church "sumptuous".

Above the chancel arch is a large 15th-century doom painting, "one of the best surviving" according to Orbach, which depicts Jesus and the twelve apostles above portrayals of heaven and hell. The painting was hidden below whitewash in 1593 during the Reformation. It was uncovered in 1881 and the paint was heavily retouched by Clayton and Bell. The painting has since been further restored, most recently in 2019.

In 1850–1860 the tall boxed pews were removed from the chancel, and the high altar and oak screens added. The window above the altar, depicting early Christian figures, was renewed in 1856. Work in the chancel by G. E. Street around this time includes the sanctuary walls, the alabaster reredos, the stalls and the stone pulpit. The oak bench pews are from later in that century.

The striking oak altar in the nave, by Matthew Burt, was installed in 2020.

A new organ was bought for the church around 1568 and replaced in 1739. The Samuel Green organ which had been presented to the cathedral by George III in 1792 was transferred to the church in 1877. It was restored and enlarged in 1897, and its most recent complete restoration was in 2020.

== Parish ==
When a parish was created for the newly founded St Edmund's Church in 1269, the city (outside the cathedral close) was divided into three parishes: St Thomas, St Edmund and the earlier St Martin's.

There has long been a link between the church and the cathedral; in 1269 the rector of St Thomas's was the succentor of the cathedral. For six years from 1363, the income of the parish was appropriated by the dean and chapter and applied to repairs to the cathedral, and this arrangement was made permanent in 1399. The chapter provided a secular chaplain to serve the church, described as a curate from at least 1553. In the 19th century the position became a perpetual curacy until 1875, when the incumbent gained the status of a vicar.

When St Edmund's Church was declared redundant in 1974, the two benefices and parishes were combined to form the parish of Salisbury St. Thomas and St. Edmund.
