= Joseph White (orientalist) =

English orientalist, theologian and university professor (1745–1814)

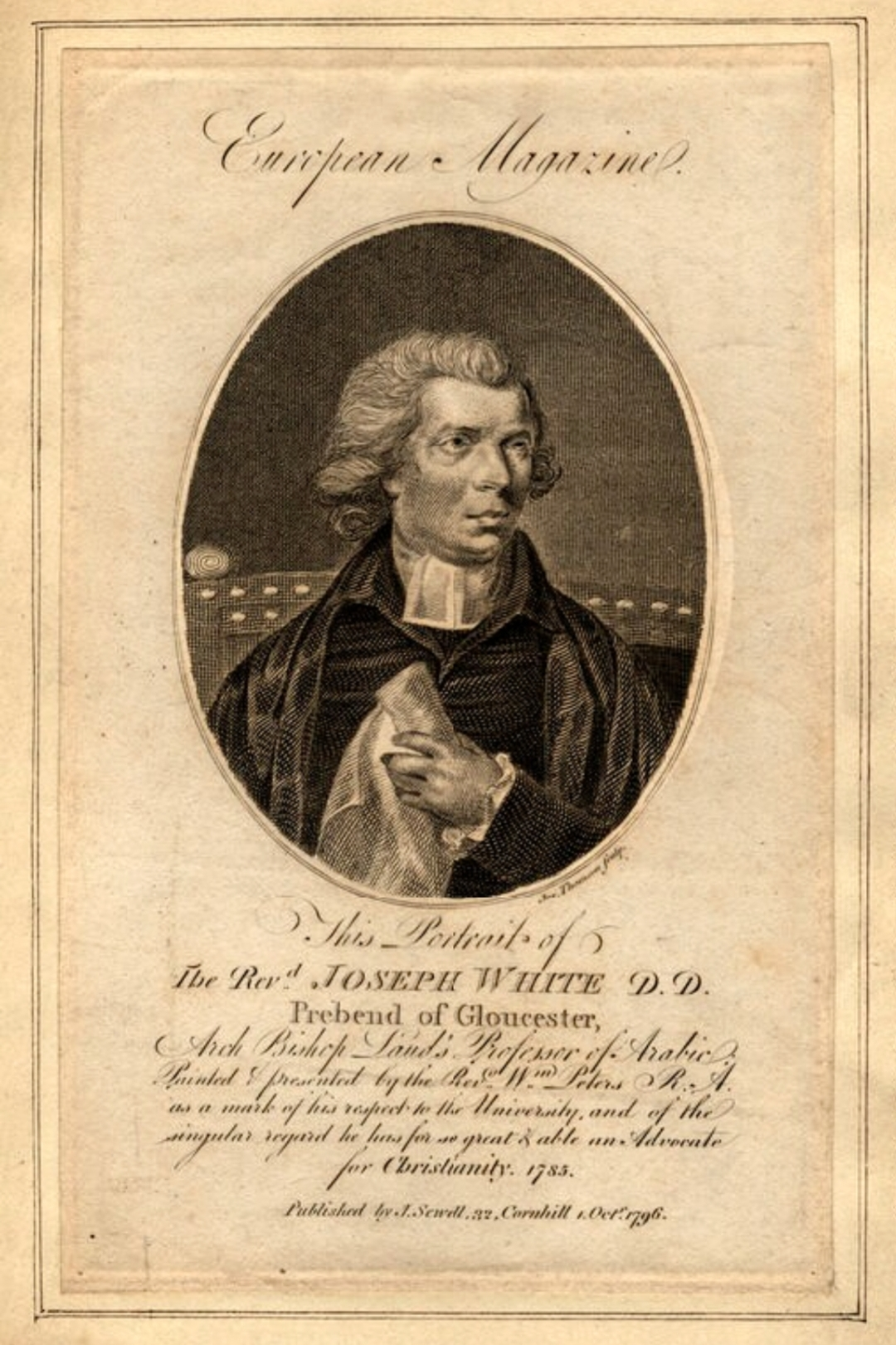
Joseph White

Joseph White (1745–1814) was an English orientalist and theologian, Laudian Professor of Arabic and then Regius Professor of Hebrew at the University of Oxford.

== Early life and career ==
He was born in Gloucestershire, the son of Thomas White, a journeyman weaver. He received his earliest education in one of the Gloucester charity schools, and started life in his father's employment. Wealthy neighbours enabled him to pursue his studies at Ruscomb and Gloucester, and with support from John Moore he entered Wadham College, Oxford, as a commoner on 6 June 1765. In September of that year he became scholar of his college, where he shortly afterwards obtained the Hody exhibition for Hebrew, as well as other prizes. He was fellow from 1771 until 1788, and filled various college offices. He graduated B.A. on 5 April 1769, M.A. on 19 February 1773, B.D. on 17 May 1779, and D.D. on 17 December 1787.

At his patron's desire he devoted himself to the study of Syriac, Arabic, and Persian, and in 1775, by a unanimous vote, was elected to the Laudian chair of Arabic. At the suggestion of Robert Lowth the delegates of the Clarendon Press entrusted to White the task of completing and issuing an edition of the Philoxenian version (more accurately, Harklensian) of the New Testament, for which Glocester Ridley had left materials, from two manuscripts which he had brought from the east. White's edition appeared in 1778.

From 1780 to 1783 he was occupied in preparing an edition of the Persian text of the 'Institutes of Timur,' of which a specimen was issued in the former year, while the whole appeared in 1783, at the expense of the East India Company. The text was accompanied by a translation into English by Major Davy, then Persian secretary to the governor-general of Bengal.

== The Bampton Lectures ==
In 1783 White, one of the preachers at Whitehall Chapel, was appointed to the recently founded Bampton lectureship for 1784, his subject being a comparison between Islam and Christianity. He asked Samuel Badcock, an impoverished clergyman and newspaper writer, to write up one lecture and large portions of others, as a secret arrangement. The lectures were very well received, and White received preferment: the rectory of Melton, Suffolk, through Moore's influence, and then a prebend at Gloucester Cathedral, through Edward Thurlow, 1st Baron Thurlow. Badcock then died, and White, in his letter of condolence to his sister, requested her to return all letters in Badcock's papers; but Miss Badcock took advice from Robert Burd Gabriel, to whom her brother had been curate. Among the papers was a bond for £500. White at first refused to pay, but afterwards agreed. Gabriel had meanwhile circulated the story, and being challenged from several quarters to produce evidence for his assertion, at length published a number of White's letters to Badcock, evidence of the joint authorship, and also suggesting that yet other hands had been employed on the discourses. Gabriel's pamphlet ran through several editions; in a rejoinder from one of White's partisans Gabriel was virulently attacked. White in 1790 published an account of his literary obligations, maintaining that the bond was for help in a projected history of Egypt, of which work on Abd-el-latif was to be the first part.

== Later career ==
Between 1790 and 1800 he published little. In the latter year his edition of Abdullatif at last appeared, with a dedication to Sir William Scott. He had printed the text sixteen years before, but, not being satisfied with it, had presented the copies to Heinrich Paulus who issued the work in Germany. White's edition embodied a translation which had been begun by Edward Pococke the Younger, but was completed by White himself. The elaborate monograph on Pompey's Pillar which White published in 1804 became antiquated in the light of advances in Egyptology. The rest of White's literary work was concentrated on the textual study of the Old and New Testaments, and earned him in 1804 the regius professorship of Hebrew at Oxford, carrying with it a canonry of Christ Church, Oxford. Besides various pamphlets, in which he advocated a retranslation of the Bible, and proposed a new edition of the Septuagint, to be based on the Hexaplar-Syriac manuscript then recently discovered at Milan, he published in 1800 a Diatessaron or Harmony of the Gospels. His edition of the New Testament in Greek (1st edit. 1808; often reprinted) popularised Johann Jakob Griesbach's Critical Studies. His last work, Criseos Griesbachianae in Novum Testamentum Synopsis (1811) contains a summary of the more important results. Both as a theologian and as a critic he was most conservative.

White died at Christ Church, Oxford, on 23 May 1814. He married, in 1790, Mary Turner, sister of Samuel Turner who visited Tibet as a British envoy. She died in 1811.
