= Robert Gandell =

British academic and biblical scholar

Robert Gandell (1818 – 24 October 1887) was a British academic and biblical scholar who was a Laudian Professor of Arabic from 1861 until his death.

== Life ==
Gandell, from London, was educated at Mill Hill School and King's College London. He then moved to the University of Oxford, matriculating as a member of St John's College, Oxford, in 1839 but transferring to The Queen's College, Oxford, where he graduated with a Bachelor of Arts degree in 1843. He was a fellow of Queen's between 1845 and 1850, a tutor at Magdalen Hall, Oxford, from 1848 to 1872, and a fellow at Hertford College, Oxford, from 1859 to 1861. He was appointed Laudian Professor of Arabic in 1861, and was a prebendary of Wells Cathedral from 1874, becoming a canon in 1880. His publications included a four-volume edition of John Lightfoot's Horae Hebraicae (1859) and commentaries on some books of the Old Testament. He died in Wells on 24 October 1887.
