= Thomas Hunt (Arabic scholar) =

English academic, Oxford Laudian Professor of Arabic (1696–1774)

Thomas Hunt FRS (18 September 1696 – 31 October 1774) was an English academic, who was Laudian Professor of Arabic at the University of Oxford from 1738 until his death.

== Life ==
Hunt was born in Horsington, Somerset and, after being educated locally, studied at the University of Oxford as a member of Christ Church, Oxford (matriculating in 1715 and obtaining his Bachelor of Arts degree in 1718). He was a tutor at Hart Hall, Oxford from 1718, and was ordained deacon in 1720 and priest in 1721. Ecclesiastical appointments that he held were rector of Chelwood, Somerset (1721); prebend of Whitelackington, Somerset (1726); chaplain to Thomas Parker, 1st Earl of Macclesfield and tutor to his grandsons (1728); rector of Bix, Oxfordshire (1729); and rector of Shirburn, Oxfordshire (1731). He became Laudian Professor of Arabic in 1738, additionally becoming Lord Almoner's Professor of Arabic in 1740 (the year in which he was elected a Fellow of the Royal Society) and Regius Professor of Hebrew in 1747; he gave up the Lord Almoner's chair when taking up the Regius Professorship. He published extensively on Arabic and Hebrew matters, and was a well-regarded scholar who encouraged others. He died on 31 October 1774 and was buried in Christ Church Cathedral, Oxford, where he held a canonry by virtue of the Regius Professorship.
