= Alexander Nicoll =

Scottish orientalist (1793–1828)

Alexander Nicoll (1793–1828) was a Scottish orientalist, known for his bibliographical work. He became Regius Professor of Hebrew at Oxford in 1822.

== Life ==
The youngest son of John Nicoll, he was born at Monymusk, Aberdeenshire, 3 April 1793. After attending successively a private school, the parish school, and Aberdeen grammar school, he entered Aberdeen University, where he studied two years with distinction. In 1807 he moved to Balliol College, Oxford, on a Snell exhibition, and graduated B.A. in 1811, and M.A. in 1814.

Nicoll began oriental studies in 1813, and was later appointed sub-librarian in the Bodleian Library. In 1817 he took deacon's orders, and became a curate in an Oxford church. In 1822 he succeeded Richard Laurence as Regius Professor of Hebrew and canon of Christ Church, Oxford; and was made D.C.L. in the same year.

Nicoll was elected a Fellow of the Royal Society in 1826. He died of bronchitis on 24 September 1828.

== Works ==
Nicoll's main work was his catalogues of the oriental manuscripts in the Bodleian Library. He first arranged those acquired by Edward Daniel Clarke, and published in 1815 a second part of the catalogue, which dealt with the oriental manuscripts; the first part, dealing with the classical manuscripts, had been issued by Thomas Gaisford in 1812. In 1818 Nicoll published Notitia Codicis Samaritano-Arabici Pentateuchi in Bibl. Bodleiana, Oxford. Finally, he added in 1821 a second part to the Bibliothecæ Bodleianæ Codicum Manuscriptorum Orientalium Catalogus, of which the first part, by Joannes Uri, had appeared in 1788. The third part, by Edward Bouverie Pusey, was printed in 1835.

== Family ==
Nicoll was twice married—first to Johanna Felborg, who died in 1816 within days of the marriage; and, secondly, to Sophia, daughter of James Parsons, the editor of the Oxford Septuagint’ who prepared a posthumous volume of Nicoll's sermons, with memoir, in 1830. By his second wife he left three daughters.
