= Tahera Qutbuddin =

Indian Professor of Arabic (born 1964)

- Born: 1964 (age 61–62); Mumbai, India
- Education: Ain Shams University, Harvard University
- Awards: Sheikh Zayed Book Award (2021)
- Scientific career
- Fields: Arabic literature, oratory
- Workplaces: University of Chicago, University of Oxford
- Thesis: Al-Mua̓yyad fī al-Dīn al-Shīrāzī: Founder of a new tradition of Fatimid Dawa poetry (1999)
- Doctoral advisor: Wolfhart Heinrichs

Tahera Qutbuddin (born 1964, Mumbai) is the Abdulaziz Saud AlBabtain Laudian Professor of Arabic at the University of Oxford. A Guggenheim Fellow (2020) and a winner of the Sheikh Zayed Book Award in 2021, she is best known for her works on the teachings of Imam Ali, Arabic oratory, and the usage of Arabic in India, especially in the Tayyibi tradition.

== Life ==
Tahera Qutbuddin was born in Mumbai in 1964. Syedna Mohammed Burhanuddin, a leader of the Dawoodi Bohra community, was her uncle. She attended Villa Theresa High School and Sophia College for Women, where she completed her secondary education in 1984.

Qutbuddin learned Arabic from her father, Khuzaima Qutbuddin. She received a bachelor's degree (1988) and a tamhidi magister (1990) from Ain Shams University, Cairo, followed by master's (1994) and doctoral degrees from Harvard University (1999), where her advisor was Wolfhart Heinrichs.

== Career ==
In 2002, Qutbuddin joined the Department of Near Eastern Languages and Civilizations of the University of Chicago. She was made a Carnegie Scholar in 2008 and a Guggenheim fellow (2020).

Among her early publications was a study of the Arabic language in India, especially among the Qutbi Bohras, and its influence on the Gujarati language sermons of Syedna Taher Fakhruddin.

Qutbuddin's 2005 monograph Al-Muʾayyad al-Shirāzī and Fāṭimid Daʿwa Poetry. A Case of Commitment in Classical Arabic Literature expanded on her doctoral thesis of 1999. It was deemed especially important for its access to the Tayyibi Ismaili Daʿwa private manuscripts in India. She showed that Al-Muʾayyad al-Shirāzī was a major innovator in developing committed literature, i.e., literature produced by someone convinced of a particular ideology who seeks to persuade society of its truth. She showed that Fatimid poetry before al-Shirāzī was stylistically and thematically similar to that of the Abbasids, whose main exponents were panegyrists, whereas al-Shirāzī's works were entirely in the promotion of the Daʿwa. She also showed how the traditions of the Tayyibi Ismailis moved to Yemen and thereafter to India after the death of al-Shirāzī, where his poetry's influence on the Qutbi Bohra community endures to present times.

In 2013, Qutbuddin published an edition of her translations of Al-Qāḍī Al-Quḍāʿī's collection of the sayings and sermons of Imam Ali and Al-Jāḥiẓ's selection of proverbs attributed to Ali. It was considered a definitive work as it considered all available editions and manuscripts, unlike previous translations of these important examples of Islamic religious literature. In particular, she was lauded for the quality of the translations, which conveyed well the punchiness of the pithy Arabic expressions and the variations in their meanings.

Qutbuddin's book Arabic Oration – Art and Function (2019) traced Arabic literature from its oral origins to its influence on modern sermons. She created a comparative framework between Arabic and Greek oratory and explored how oratory was the foundation for the shaping of politics and public speaking, as well as thence to literature. She had worked on it for over a decade, although she had had the idea for it during her undergraduate days in Cairo. She explored the cultural milieu around Imam Ali and the aesthetics of his sermons. She established that public preaching in the form of khutbah, popular till today, stemmed from pre-Islamic oratory, with texts available from decades before the founding of the faith. Much of the orally transmitted literature was lost, but several texts in Arabic survive. The oratory depended much on visual imagery, but especially on rhythm and similar grammatical structure in every line, reinforcing the message in the listeners' minds. Qutbuddin also found that women held important positions in early Islamic society but were permitted to speak publicly only in times of acute trouble. An example was the declamation by Imam Ali's daughter Zaynab, who, following the defeat of Ali's descendants at the Battle of Karbala, castigated the victor, Yazid I, for his actions.

In 2021, Qutbuddin was working on a monograph on Imam Ali, the fourth caliph of Islam, titled ʿAli ibn Abi Talib: Life, Teachings, and Eloquence of the Sage of Islam. Ali is considered a master guide for life on earth and heaven by Sunnis and Shiites; his orations are exemplary and beautiful, with ornate, difficult vocabulary. Qutbuddin focussed on the interrelationships between political, religious and literary aspects of his life, aiming to reconstruct his life.

As of July 2023, she has been the AlBabtain Laudian Professor of Arabic in the Faculty of Asian and Middle Eastern Studies at Oxford and a Professorial Fellow of St John’s College.

== Selected works ==
- Nahj al-Balāghah: The Wisdom and Eloquence of ʿAlī. Tahera Qutbuddin (ed. and trans.). Brill 2014. ISBN 978-90-04-68259-7. [OPEN ACCESS]
- Arabic Oration: Art and Function. Brill. 2019. ISBN 9789004395800.
- Al-Qāḍī l-Quḍāʿī (2016). Tahera Qutbuddin (ed. and trans.). Light in the Heavens: Sayings of the Prophet Muhammad. NYU Press. ISBN 978-1479871469.
- Al-Qāḍī Al-Quḍāʿī (2013). Tahera Qutbuddin (ed.). A Treasury of Virtues: Sayings, Sermons and Teachings of ʿAlī with the One Hundred Proverbs attributed to Al-Jāḥiẓ. NYU Press. ISBN 9781479826551.
- Al-Muʾayyad Al-Shīrāzī and Fatimid Daʿwa Poetry: A Case of Commitment in Classical Arabic Literature. Brill. 2005. ISBN 9789004141032.

== Bibliography ==
- Ahmad, Saiyad Nizamuddin (2007). "Al-Mu˒ayyad al-Shirāzī and Fāṭimid Da˓wa Poetry. A Case of Commitment in Classical Arabic Literature by Tahera Qutbuddin, Wadad Kadi, Routraud Wielandt". Journal of Arabic Literature. 38 (2). doi:10.1163/157006407783182281. JSTOR 25597945.
- Selove, Emily (2014). "A Treasury of Virtues: Sayings, Sermons and Teachings of 'Alī, with the One Hundred Proverbs Attributed to al-Jāḥiẓ, (Library of Arabic Literature) by al-Qāḍī al-Quḍāʿī, Tahera Qutbuddin". Speculum. 89 (2). JSTOR 43577121.
- Traboulsi, Samer (2014). "A Treasury of Virtues: Sayings, Sermons and Teachings of Alī with the One Hundred Proverbs attributed to Al-Jāḥiẓ (Library of Arabic Literature.) by AL-QĀḌĪ AL-QUḌĀʿĪ, Tahera Qutbuddin". Bulletin of the School of Oriental and African Studies. 77 (2). JSTOR 24692732.
- Patterson, Sara; Wang, Jack (10 April 2020). "Five UChicago scholars awarded 2020 Guggenheim Fellowships". University of Chicago.
- "Tahera Qutbuddin". John Simon Guggenheim Memorial Foundation. 2020.
- Kamdar, Shraddha (30 April 2021). "Mumbai-born Dr Tahera Qutbuddin First Indian To Win Arab World Nobel Prize". Femina.
- Rodricks, Cynera (16 May 2021). "Mumbai inspired my work, says Sheikh Zayed Book Award winner". Mid-Day.
- Patterson, Sara (27 May 2021). "Prof. Tahera Qutbuddin honored for landmark book examining seventh-century Arabic oration". University of Chicago.
- Bedirian, Razmig (24 June 2021). "How Sheikh Zayed Book Award winner Tahera Qutbuddin unravelled years of early Arabic oration". The National.
