= List of people associated with Oriel College, Oxford =

A list of notable people affiliated with Oriel College, Oxford University, England, including alumni, academics, provosts and honorary fellows.

== Alumni ==
=== Academics ===
- Richard Ithamar Aaron – D.Phil student, graduated 1928: Welsh philosopher.
- Donald Ferlys Wilson Baden-Powell – Undergraduate 1917: Geologist and palaeolithic archeologist.
- Marius Barbeau – Rhodes Scholar 1907–1910: Canadian ethnographer and folklorist.
- Geoffrey Barraclough – scholar in History 1926–1929. Chichele Professor of Modern History, University of Oxford, 1970–73.
- Harold Idris Bell – Adam de Brome scholar 1897, British papyrologist (specialising in Roman Egypt) and scholar of Welsh literature.
- Peter Brunt – Ancient historian.
- Anthony Collett – author and writer on natural history.
- Richard A. Epstein – American legal scholar
- Eric Foner – American historian, Bancroft Prize winner.
- Jeff Forshaw – Particle physicist, winner of the Maxwell Medal and Prize.
- James Anthony Froude – Undergraduate 1836 to 1840: English historian and Regius Professor of Modern History, 1892 to 1894.
- Robert Alfred Cloynes Godwin-Austen – Undergraduate 1826–1830: English geologist, Fellow in 1830.
- Richard Heydarian – Filipino author and political scientist, recipient of the Ten Outstanding Young Persons of the World award.
- Sir Francis Knowles, 5th Baronet – Archaeologist
- J. L. Mackie – Undergraduate 1938 to 1940: Australian Philosopher.
- James Meade – Undergraduate 1926 to 1930: Economist, Nobel Prize award winner.
- Edward Thomas Monro – Principal Physician of Bethlem Hospital from 1816.
- Henry Monro – President of the Medical Psychological Association in 1864–1865.
- Thomas Monro – Principal Physician of Bedlam Hospital from 1816.
- Michael Moore – Professor of theoretical physics at the University of Manchester
- John Nunn – English chess player and mathematician
- Mark Pattison – Undergraduate 1832: English author and rector of Lincoln College, Oxford.
- Eduardo Peñalver – American law professor, President-elect of Seattle University, and Dean of Cornell Law School.
- Baden Powell – Undergraduate 1814 to 1817: Physicist and theologian, father of Robert Baden-Powell, founder of the Scout Movement.
- Paul Preston – Professor in International History at the London School of Economics; historian of modern Spain.
- Philip Russell, FRS – Director of the third division of the Max Planck Research Group at the Institute of Optics, Information and Photonics at the University of Erlangen-Nuremberg.
- John Martin Robinson – Historian and author.
- William David Ross – philosopher, Aristotelian scholar, Provost of Oriel College, Vice Chancellor of Oxford University.
- Rebecca Saxe – Undergraduate 1997–2000, Professor of Brain and Cognitive Sciences, MIT.
- Hugh Edwin Strickland – Undergraduate 1829: English geologist, ornithologist and systemist.
- Ronald Syme – New Zealand-born historian, was the pre-eminent classicist of the 20th century.
- A.J.P. Taylor – Undergraduate 1924 to 1927: Renowned British historian of the 20th century.
- Alexander Todd – Undergraduate 1931 to 1934: Chemist, Nobel Prize award winner.
- D. E. R. Watt – Scottish historian and Professor Emeritus at St Andrews University.
- Ronald Lampman Watts – Canadian academic and the 15th Principal and Vice-chancellor of Queen's University from 1974 until 1984.
- Miles Weatherall – Physician and research pharmacologist affiliated with London Hospital Medical College and Wellcome Research Laboratories.
- Gilbert White – Undergraduate 1739 to 1743, Fellow of the college 1744 to 1793. Pioneering naturalist and ornithologist.

=== Clergy ===
- William Allen – Undergraduate 1547, Fellow of the college from 1550 to 1561: Principal of St Mary Hall 1556 to 1561, fellow at University of Douai, Cardinal.
- Thomas Arundel – Undergraduate 1373: Son of Richard FitzAlan, 10th Earl of Arundel, with whom he erected the first college chapel. Chancellor of England and Archbishop of Canterbury.
- Godwin Birchenough – Dean of Ripon Cathedral.
- Lancelot Charles Lee Brenton – Churchman and translator of one of only two English translations of the Septuagint.
- Joseph Butler – Undergraduate 1715 to 1718, graduate until 1733: Bishop of Bristol and Dean of St Paul's Cathedral 1740, Bishop of Durham 1750.
- David Chillingworth – Bishop of St Andrews, Dunkeld, and Dunblane 2005–
- Nigel Cornwall – Bishop of Borneo 1949–1962.
- Maxwell Craig – Minister of the Church of Scotland and General Secretary of Action of Churches Together in Scotland 1990–1999.
- Harold de Soysa – Bishop of Colombo 1964–1971.
- Frank Tracy Griswold – Presiding Bishop and Primate of the Episcopal Church in the United States of America.
- Gerald Edgcumbe Hadow – English Christian missionary to East Africa in the mid-twentieth century.
- Renn Hampden – Bampton lecturer in 1832, principal of St Mary Hall 1833, Bishop of Hereford 1847.
- David Hand – Bishop Coadjutor of New Guinea 1950–1963, Archbishop of Papua New Guinea 1977–1983
- James Hannington – Undergraduate 1868 to 1873: Missionary bishop.
- Michael Ipgrave – Bishop of Lichfield.
- George Wyndham Kennion – Anglican bishop of Adelaide and Bath and Wells.
- Edward King – Bishop of Lincoln 1885 to 1910.
- Edward Monro-High Church priest and writer.
- Thomas Mozley – English clergyman and writer.
- Reginald Pecock – Bishop of Chichester
- Iain Torrance – President of Princeton Theological Seminary and a former Moderator of the General Assembly of the Church of Scotland.
- Vernon White – MLitt in Theology 1980, now principal of STETS and Canon of Winchester
- Samuel Wilberforce – Undergraduate 1823 to 1826: Bishop of Oxford and Winchester. Opposed Darwin's theory of evolution in a famous debate with biologist Thomas Huxley.

=== Politicians ===
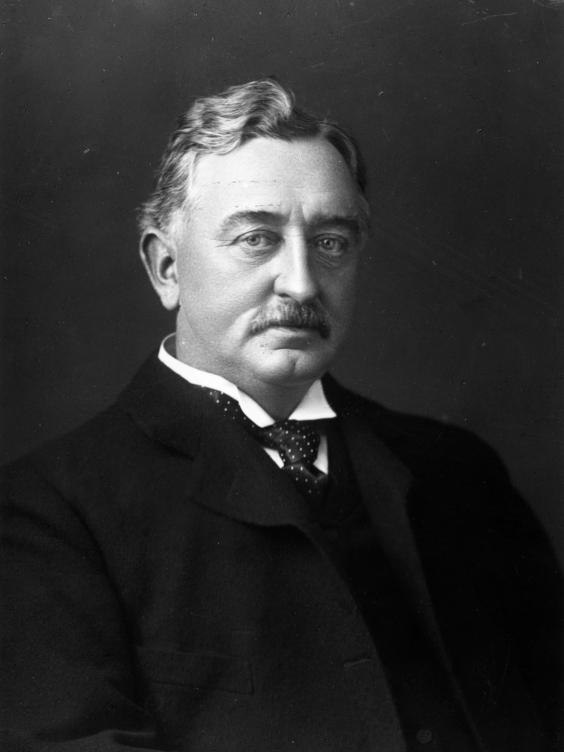
Cecil Rhodes

- Anthony Barber MP, Chancellor of the Exchequer 1970
- Alexander Hugh Bruce, 6th Lord Balfour of Burleigh – Scottish politician and statesman, Minister for Scotland 1895 to 1903.
- James Brudenell, 5th Earl of Cardigan – Member of Parliament and later peer.
- Donald Cameron – Member of the Scottish Parliament since 2016.
- Nathaniel Clements, 2nd Earl of Leitrim – Irish nobleman and politician.
- George Coldstream – Permanent Secretary to the Lord Chancellor's Office
- Abdul El-Sayed - United States Senator-Elect for Michigan
- Peter Emery – Member of Parliament from 1959 to 2001, appointed Privy Counsellor in 1993.
- William Grant – Scottish MP (1955 to 1962) and judge. Lord Justice Clerk 1962 to 1972.
- George Wellesley Hamilton – Ontario political figure, Canadian Conservative MP from 1871 to 1874.
- William Gerard Hamilton – English Statesman, Chief Secretary for Ireland 1761 to 1764.
- Daniel Hannan – British politician and Conservative MEP (1999 to 2020).
- James Howard Harris, 3rd Earl of Malmesbury – Foreign Secretary 1852 and 1858 to 1859, Lord Privy Seal 1866 to 1868 and 1874 to 1876.
- Alan Haselhurst – British politician – Deputy Speaker of the House of Commons 1997 to 2010, later a life peer.
- Sidney Herbert, 1st Baron Herbert of Lea – English statesman.
- Angus Maude – Conservative party MP from 1963 to 1983, Paymaster General from 1979 until 1981.
- Paul Murphy – Secretary of State for Northern Ireland (2002 to 2005) and for Wales (2008 to 2009), later a life peer.
- Wilfrid Normand, Baron Normand – Scottish politician and judge.
- Phillip Oppenheim – MP from 1983 to 1997, businessman, credited for introducing Mojitos to the UK.
- Robert Pierrepont, 1st Earl of Kingston-upon-Hull – Member of parliament (1601) and hereditary peer.
- Cecil Rhodes – Undergraduate 1873, 1876 to 1878, 1881: Politician, businessman and the effective founder of the state of Rhodesia.
- Andrew Robathan – British Conservative politician, and Member of Parliament for Blaby.
- Thomas Sotheron-Estcourt – British politician, Home Secretary 1859.
- John Spencer-Churchill, 7th Duke of Marlborough – Undergraduate 1840: Lord President of the Council 1867; grandfather of Sir Winston Churchill.
- Charles Talbot, 1st Baron Talbot of Hensol – Lord Chancellor 1733 to 1737.
- Christopher Rice Mansel Talbot – Industrialist, Liberal Member of Parliament for Glamorgan for sixty years.
- William Vesey-FitzGerald – British politician, Governor of Bombay 1867 to 1872 and Member of Parliament for Horsham.
- Lutz Graf Schwerin von Krosigk – Reich Minister of Finance 1932 to 1945, Leading Minister and de facto Chancellor of Germany 1945.
- Charles Wegg-Prosser – British politician and solicitor

=== Civil servants ===
- Stewart Crawford – diplomat
- Robert Chalmers, 1st Baron Chalmers – BA 1881. Governor of Ceylon 1913–1915
- Lebrecht Wilhelm Fifi Hesse – First Black African Rhodes Scholar, former Director General of the Ghana Broadcasting Corporation
- Hugh Trevor Lambrick – archaeologist, historian and administrator
- David Manning – British Ambassador to the United States, Hon. Fellow.
- Herman Merivale – English civil servant and author.
- Peter Neyroud – chief executive officer (Designate) for the National Policing Improvement Agency (NPIA), and former Chief Constable of Thames Valley Police.
- Cranley Onslow – MI6 field agent and privy counsellor.
- Fabian Picardo – Chief Minister of Gibraltar
- Oswald Rayner – British intelligence officer
- Frederic Rogers, 1st Baron Blachford – British civil servant.
- Henry Unton – English diplomat, ambassador to Henry IV of France.

=== Literary and performing artists ===
- Jon Bentley – British journalist and television presenter.
- Norman Cameron – poet.
- Rosaline Elbay – actor and writer.
- Edmund Fellowes – Undergraduate 1889 to 1892: Music editor and author on 16th and 17th century English music.
- David Giles – British television director.
- Os Guinness – Writer and social critic living in McLean, Virginia.
- Peter Harness – British dramatist and screenwriter.
- Christopher Hibbert – English writer and popular historian and biographer.
- Michael Hoffman – Undergraduate 1979: Film director
- Thomas Hughes – Undergraduate 1841 to 1845: Author of Tom Brown's Schooldays, founder member of the Christian Socialists.
- Richard Hughes – British writer of poems, short stories, novels and plays.
- Francis Kynaston – Undergraduate 1601: English courtier and poet.
- Matt Lacey – actor and comedian.
- James Leasor – Undergraduate 1946 to 1948: English writer and popular historian.
- Eugene Lee-Hamilton – Late-Victorian English poet.
- Philip Napier Miles – 1865–1935 – composer and philanthropist.
- Martin Mills – British Music Industry Executive.
- Nick Newman – cartoonist and scriptwriter
- Adam Raphael – journalist.
- Rachel Riley – television presenter.
- Eric Schlosser – American journalist and author.
- W. C. Sellar & R. J. Yeatman – Undergraduates 1919 to 1922: Humorists, authors of 1066 and All That.
- William Seward, matriculated 1764, anecdotist and conversationalist
- Richard Simpson – British Roman Catholic writer and literary scholar.
- J. I. M. Stewart – Scottish author whose pen name was Michael Innes.
- Joseph Warton – English academic and literary critic.
- Nigel Williams – novelist, playwright and screenwriter.
- Sandy Wilson – British lyricist and composer of The Boy Friend (1954).
- Michael Wood – Popular British historian, broadcaster and television presenter.
- Camilla Wright – Editor of Popbitch
- David Wright – Author and poet.

=== Lawyers, judges and statesmen ===
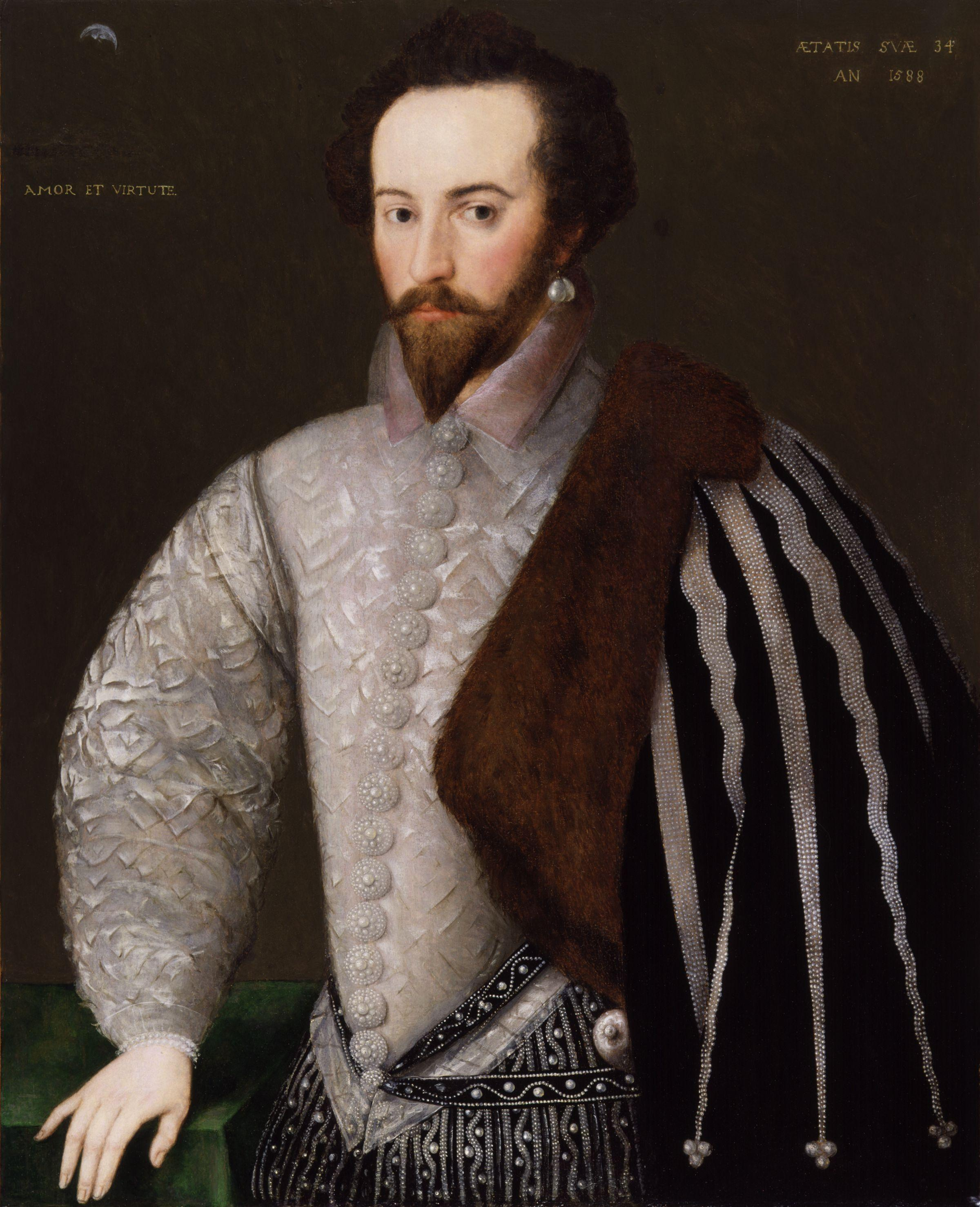
Sir Walter Raleigh

- Kwamena Bentsi-Enchill – judge and academic; justice of the Supreme Court of Ghana (1971–1972)
- Geoffrey Bindman – human rights lawyer.
- Alexander Croke – British judge, colonial administrator and author influential in Nova Scotia of the early 19th century.
- Thomas Fairfax, 6th Lord Fairfax of Cameron – Undergraduate 1710 to July 1713: friend and patron of George Washington.
- Sir Francis Ferris QC (1932–2018) – High Court Judge (Chancery Division).
- George Joachim Goschen, 1st Viscount Goschen – British statesman and businessman.
- John Holt – Lord Chief Justice of England and Wales from 1689 to 1710.
- William Prynne – Graduated BA 1621; lawyer, author, polemicist.
- Walter Raleigh – Undergraduate 1572 to 1574: Courtier, statesman, scientist, writer, poet, spy, and explorer.
- A. N. Ray – Chief Justice of India (1973–77). Studied modern history.
- William Scroggs – Undergraduate 1639 to c.1640: Lord Chief Justice over the Popish Plot.

=== Sports people ===
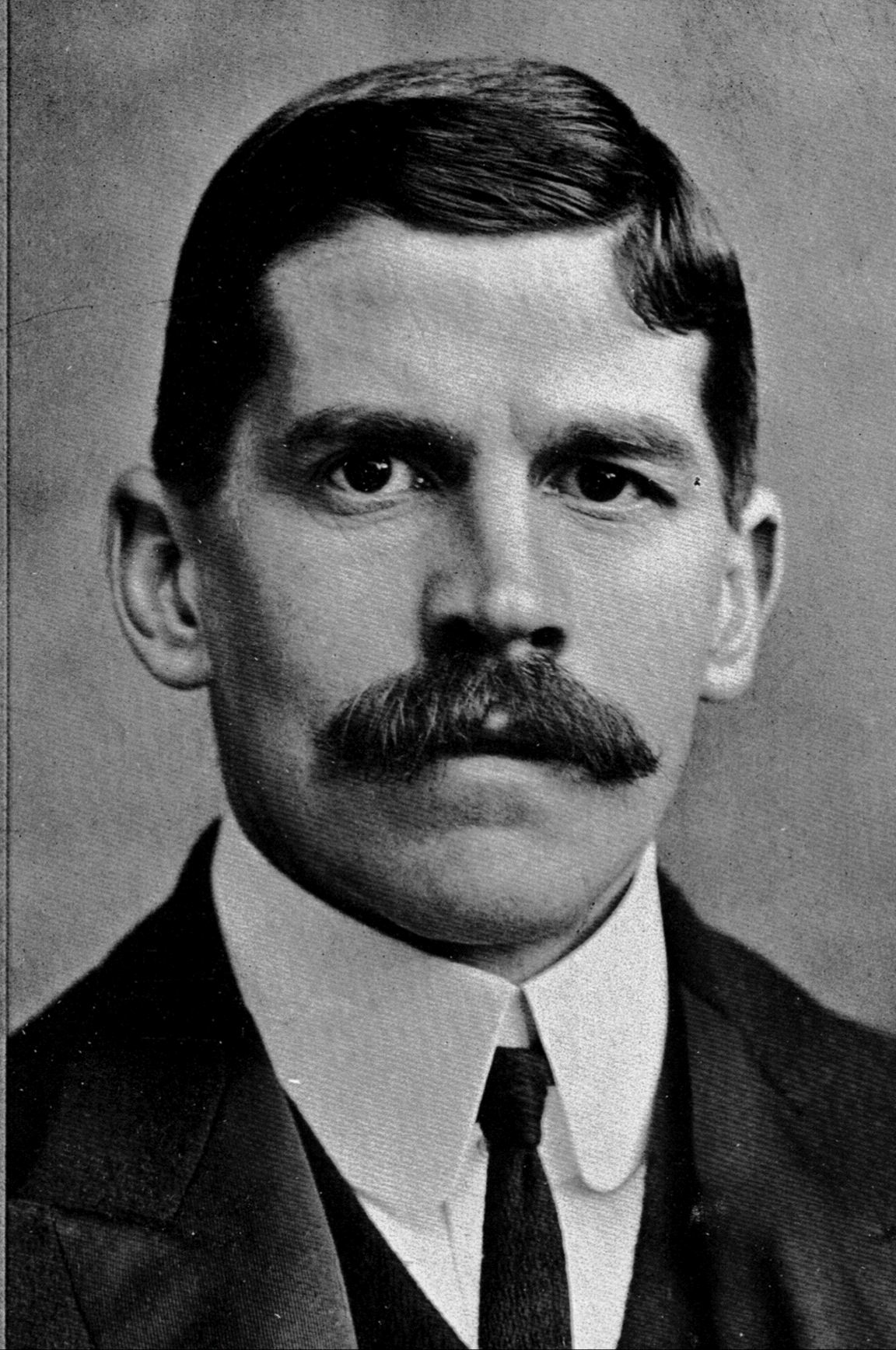
Charles Wreford Brown

- Bernard Bosanquet – Undergraduate 1896 to 1899: Triple Blues, English test cricketer, inventor of the googly.
- George Bridgewater – New Zealand rower, Bronze medallist in the pair at the 2008 Summer Olympics
- Charles Wreford-Brown – Captained the England national football team several times between 1894 and 1895, credited with inventing the word soccer.
- Robert Dickinson, Olympic athlete
- Peter Hackworth – British coxswain, cox of the 2002 Blue Boat
- Sjoerd Hamburger – Dutch rower, competed in the 2009 and 2010 Boat Races
- Harold Holding - Olympic athlete
- Malcolm Howard – Canadian rower, Olympic Gold medalist and 2014 OUBC President
- Chris Mahoney – British rower, Olympic Silver medalist in 1980
- Lucas McGee – American rower, USRowing Men's National Team coach
- Pete Reed – British rower, Olympic champion 2008, and world champion 2005/6.
- Plum Warner – Played first-class cricket for Oxford University, Middlesex and England.

=== Other people ===
- David Arculus – English businessman.
- Beau Brummell – Undergraduate 1794: Dandy and arbiter of fashion.
- Clive Cheesman – Undergraduate: Richmond Herald 2010–current.
- Graham Chipchase – CEO of Rexam plc.
- Geoffrey Sandford Cox – former editor and chief executive of ITN and a founder of News at Ten.
- James Ralph Darling – Headmaster of Geelong Grammar School, and Chairman of the Australian Broadcasting Commission.
- Michael Edwards – academic, writer and activist.
- Chris Green – British railway manager.
- Charles Handy – Management educator. Honorary Fellow.
- Edward Leigh, 5th Baron Leigh – Undergraduate 1761 to 1764: High Steward of Oxford University and benefactor.
- Jim Mellon – British businessman. Honorary Fellow.
- David Menhennet (1928–2016), 10th Librarian of the House of Commons Library

== Fellows and lecturers ==
- Matthew Arnold – Elected 28 March 1845, perpetual Fellow 17 April 1846, vacated (due to marriage) 6 April 1852: Poet and critic, Oxford Professor of Poetry from 1857 to 1867
- Thomas Arnold – Elected 31 March 1815, perpetual Fellow 20 July 1816, year of grace (due to marriage) 12 August 1820: Headmaster of Rugby School 1828 to 1841 and Regius Professor of Modern History from 1841 to 1842.
- John Ashwardby – follower of John Wycliffe, Vice-Chancellor of the University of Oxford (1391–1394)
- Robert Beddard – Fellow to 2006: British historian.
- Henry Bishop – member of the Royal Commission into the Operation of the Poor Laws 1832
- Derek Blake – Wellcome Trust Senior Fellow in Basic Biomedical Science at Oriel until 2007.
- Joseph Bowles – Bodley's Librarian, Fellow from 1719
- Henry Brooke – schoolmaster and divine
- Thomas Edward Brown – Elected 21 April 1854, perpetual Fellow 13 April 1855, year of grace (due to marriage) 24 June 1857: Poet.

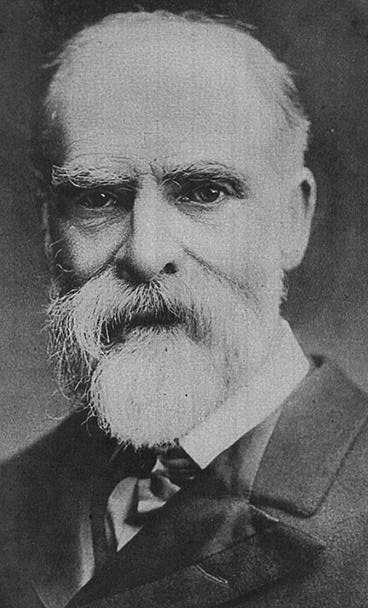
James Bryce, Member of Parliament for Aberdeen South 1885–1907

- James Bryce, 1st Viscount Bryce – Elected 25 April 1862, perpetual Fellow 6 April 1863, resigned June 1893, honorary fellow 12 October 1894: British jurist, historian and politician.
- John Burgon – Elected 17 April 1846, perpetual Fellow 5 April 1847: Dean of Chichester Cathedral.
- The Rev. Charles Fox Burney – Oriel Professor of the Interpretation of Holy Scripture from 1914, elected Fellow in 1919
- Jeremy Catto – Fellow to 2006: British historian.
- Thomas Kelly Cheyne – Fellow 1885 to 1905: English Biblical critic.
- Richard William Church – Fellow 1838, Dean of St Paul's 1871–1890.
- Arthur Hugh Clough – Elected 1 April 1842, perpetual Fellow 21 April 1843: English poet.
- Thomas Cogan – physician, fellow in 1563, resigned his fellowship 1574
- John Cook Wilson – Fellow in 1874, Wykeham Professor of Logic from 1889
- Richard Alan Cross – Fellow, Professor of Medieval Theology and Tutor in Theology.
- Henry William Carless Davis – Fellow 1925 to 1928: British historian, editor of the Dictionary of National Biography and Regius Professor of Modern History.
- John Davison – clergyman and theological writer, Fellow 1800, and tutor at Oriel
- George Anthony Denison – Elected 11 April 1828, perpetual Fellow 24 April 1829: English churchman, curate of Cuddesdon.
- Frederick Dillistone – Dean of Liverpool (1956–1963), Fellow and Chaplain of Oriel (1964–70)
- John Flemming – economist and Warden of Wadham College, Oxford, Lecturer and Fellow (1963–65)
- James Fraser – Elected 24 April 1840, perpetual Fellow 1841, vacated fellowship 20 December 1861: Anglican Bishop of Manchester 1870 to 1885.
- Hurrell Froude – Early leader of the Oxford Movement, Fellow in 1826.
- Robert Fysher – Bodley's Librarian, Fellow in 1726
- Vivian Hunter Galbraith – Fellow of the British Academy and Oxford Regius Professor of Modern History.
- Eric Graham – priest, Fellow and Dean of Oriel
- Alexander Grant, 10th Baronet – Elected 13 April 1849, perpetual Fellow 1 April 1850, vacated (married) 2 June 1860: British educationalist and Principal of the University of Edinburgh
- Charles Edward Grey – Member of Parliament for Tynemouth and North Shields (1838–1841), elected in 1808
- Dalziel Hammick – Chemist, Fellow (1920–1966)
- John Harris – Bishop of Llandaff (1728–1738), Fellow in 1728
- William Holt – Jesuit, elected on 29 February 1568
- Simon Hornblower – Fellow until 1997, since when Professor of Classics and Grote Professor of Ancient History University College London
- Robert Ingham – barrister and politician, Fellow from 1816 until 1826.
- Richard William Jelf – Principal of King's College London, elected as Fellow in 1820.
- John Keble – Fellow 1811 to 1835: One of the leaders of the Oxford Movement, Oxford Professor of Poetry from 1831 to 1841, gave his name to Keble College in 1870.
- Richard Kilvington – philosopher.
- Raymond Klibansky – Honorary Fellow, Canadian Philosopher.
- William Lewis – mineralogist, elected 1871
- Humphrey Lloyd – Bishop of Bangor from 1674 until 1689, Fellow in 1630.
- Richard Mant – Fellow 1798: English churchman and writer.
- Charles Marriott – priest and a member of the Oxford Movement, Fellow 1833
- Basil Mitchell – British philosopher and Nolloth Professor of the Philosophy of the Christian Religion, Fellow 1968.
- John Henry Newman – Major figure in the Oxford Movement.
- Thomas Nowell – clergyman, historian, fellow in 1753 and Dean 1758–1760 and in 1763.
- Cadwallader Owen – Welsh clergyman, Fellow from 1585 to no later than 1606
- Frederick York Powell – Fellow and Regius Professor of Modern History, 1894 to 1904
- Edward Bouverie Pusey – One of the leaders of the Oxford Movement.
- George Richards – priest, poet, Fellow 1790–1796
- Samuel Rickards – priest, opponent of the Oxford Movement, Fellow from 16 April 1819 to 6 October 1822
- Howard Robinson – philosopher, Fellow and lecturer in philosophy (1970–1974), Provost (Pro-Rector) of the Central European University.
- John Robinson – Fellow, English diplomat, Bishop of Bristol and London.
- Richard Robinson – Fellow and Tutor in Philosophy 1946–69, Author of An Atheists Values
- John Rouse – second Bodley's Librarian, friend of John Milton, Fellow 1600.

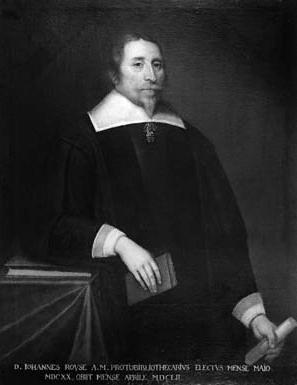
A portrait of John Rouse in Oriel College

- William Young Sellar – Fellow, Scottish classical scholar.
- William Henry Stowe – scholar and journalist, Fellow March 1852
- John Van Seters – Visiting Research Fellow (1985–86)
- Thomas Vesey, 1st Baronet – Irish clergyman, Bishop of Ossory from 1714 to 1730
- William Wand – Fellow and Dean from 1925: English born Anglican Archbishop of Brisbane, Australia.
- Richard Whately – Undergraduate, Fellow 1811: English logician, economist and theological writer, Archbishop of Dublin
- Robert Wilberforce – clergyman, writer, second son of William Wilberforce, Fellow 1826–1831.
- John Wordsworth – Oriel Professor of the Interpretation of Holy Scripture, Bishop of Salisbury.

=== Current fellows ===
Ordered by seniority of fellowship, oldest first;

- Gordon MacPherson – (Reader in Experimental Pathology, Turnbull Fellow and Tutor in Medicine), Former Senior Tutor. Emeritus.
- Glenn Black – Emeritus Fellow.
- David Charles – Colin Prestige Fellow and Tutor in Philosophy
- John Barton – Oriel Professor of the Interpretation of Holy Scripture
- Michael Spivey – Misys and Andersen Fellow, Tutor in Computer Science, and Dean of Degrees
- David Hodgson – Todd Fellow and Tutor in Chemistry
- Teresa Morgan – William and Nancy Bissell Turpin Fellow and Tutor in Ancient History, Senior Dean
- Brian Leftow – Nolloth Professor of the Philosophy of the Christian Religion
- Ian Horrocks – Professor of Computer Science

== Honorary Fellows ==
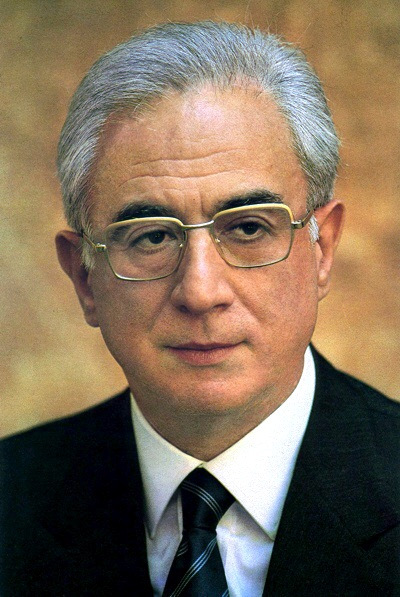
Francesco Cossiga

The following is a list of former and current Honorary Fellows who have not been included elsewhere in this article.

- Sir Al Ainsley-Green, Children's Commissioner for England (2005–2009)
- Anthony Barber, Baron Barber of Wentbridge, British Conservative politician, Chancellor of the Exchequer and member of the House of Lords.
- Jonathan Barnes – scholar of ancient philosophy, Fellow (1968–78), elected a Fellow of the British Academy in 1987.
- James Barr – British Old Testament scholar.
- Anthony Collett – author and writer on natural history.
- Francesco Cossiga – Italian politician and former President of Italy, professor of law at University of Sassari.
- Sir Zelman Cowen – Fellow 1947 to 1950, 19th Governor-General of Australia.
- Sir Crispin Davis – businessman, former chief executive of Reed Elsevier.
- Sir John Elliott – Eminent English historian and former Regius Professor of Modern History.
- Robert John Weston Evans – Regius Professor of Modern History
- Sir Ewen Fergusson – British diplomat, former ambassador to France.
- Eric Foner – American historian, Bancroft Prize winner.
- Robert Fox, British historian of science.
- Charles Handy – management educator, author and philosopher.
- Philip Harris, Baron Harris of Peckham – Conservative peer and businessman
- John Hegarty – Irish physicist, Provost of Trinity College, Dublin (2001–2011)
- Sir Michael Howard – military historian, formerly Chichele Professor of the History of War, Hon. Fellow and Regius Professor of Modern History, 1980 to 1989
- Isobel, Lady Laing – wife of Kirby Laing, of the civil engineering company
- Lee Seng Tee – Singaporean businessman and philanthropist.
- David Manning – British Ambassador to the United States.
- Colin Mayer – Peter Moores Professor of Management Studies at the Saïd Business School
- Kenneth O. Morgan – Welsh historian and author
- Paul Murphy – Secretary of State for Wales and former Secretary of State for Northern Ireland.
- Keith Murray, Baron Murray of Newhaven – Graduate of Oriel, Agricultural academic, Rector of Lincoln College, Chancellor of Southampton University (1964–74)
- William Abel Pantin – historian, Fellow and Lecturer in History, Keeper of the Archives for the university, Hon. Fellow 1971.
- Patrick Prendergast – Provost of Trinity College, Dublin
- Thomas Symons – founding President of Trent University, Canada
- John Vickers – economist and Warden of All Souls College, Oxford.
- Norman Willis – Former General Secretary of the TUC and President of the European Trade Union Confederation.

Former Visiting Fellow:

- Antonia Logue – novelist and Visiting Fellow:
