= List of University of Oxford people with PPE degrees =

Philosophy, politics and economics (PPE) at Oxford University has traditionally been a degree read by those seeking a career in politics, public life (including senior positions in His Majesty's Civil Service) and journalism.

This list does not include those notable figures, such as former U.S. President Bill Clinton, who studied PPE at the university but did not complete their degrees.

== UK politicians ==
- Danny Alexander, former British Liberal Democrat MP and former Chief Secretary to the Treasury
- Rushanara Ali, British Labour MP
- Ed Balls, former British Labour MP, former Secretary of State for Children, Schools and Families, and Strictly Come Dancing contestant
- Alan Beith, former British Liberal Democrat MP
- Torsten Bell, economist and British Labour MP
- Tony Benn, former British Labour MP and Cabinet minister
- Nicholas Boles, former British Conservative MP
- Kevin Brennan, former British Labour MP
- David Cameron, former British Conservative Prime Minister
- Barbara Castle, former Labour MP and former Cabinet minister
- Christopher Chataway, former Conservative MP, journalist and athlete
- James Clappison, former British Conservative MP
- Yvette Cooper, British Labour MP and Home Secretary
- Julian Critchley, former British Conservative MP
- Anthony Crosland, former Labour MP and former Cabinet minister
- Edwina Currie, British Conservative MP (1983–97) and former Minister
- Ed Davey, Leader of the British Liberal Democrat party and MP
- Geraint Davies, former British Labour MP
- Anneliese Dodds, British Labour MP and former MEP
- Alan Duncan, former British Conservative MP and former Minister for International Development
- Philip Dunne, former British Conservative MP
- Angela Eagle, British Labour MP and twin sister of Maria Eagle
- Maria Eagle, British Labour MP and twin sister of Angela Eagle
- Jane Ellison, former British Conservative MP
- Miatta Fahnbulleh, British Labour MP
- Paul Farrelly, former British Labour MP
- Laura Farris, former British Conservative MP
- Michael Foot, former leader of the Labour Party, former Leader of the Opposition and author
- Derek Foster, former Labour MP
- Hugh Gaitskell, British politician and former leader of the Labour Party
- George Gardiner, former British Conservative MP
- Helen Goodman, former British Labour MP
- Damian Green, British Conservative MP
- Sam Gyimah, former British Conservative Party MP
- William Hague, former British Conservative Party MP and former Secretary of State for Foreign and Commonwealth Affairs
- Duncan Hames, former British Liberal Democrat MP
- Philip Hammond, former British Conservative MP and former Chancellor of the Exchequer
- Matt Hancock, former British Conservative MP and Secretary of State for Health and Social Care
- Mark Harper, former British Conservative MP and Secretary of State for Transport
- Edward Heath, Conservative British Prime Minister (1970–74)
- David Heathcoat-Amory, former British Conservative MP
- Michael Heseltine, former British Conservative MP and former Deputy Prime Minister
- Meg Hillier, British Labour MP
- Steve Hilton, British Conservative Party Spin Doctor
- Damian Hinds, British Conservative Party MP and former Secretary of State for Education
- Richard Howitt, former European Labour Party MEP
- Chris Huhne, former British Liberal Democrat MP (2005–13) and Secretary of State for Energy and Climate Change (2010–12)
- Jeremy Hunt, British Conservative MP and former Chancellor of the Exchequer and Secretary of State for Foreign and Commonwealth Affairs
- Baroness Jay, British Labour politician and former Leader of the House of Lords
- Roy Jenkins, former Labour Cabinet minister and Deputy Leader of the Labour Party (UK), President of the European Commission, Chancellor of the University of Oxford and co-founder of the Social Democratic Party
- Gerald Kaufman, former British Labour MP
- Ruth Kelly, former British Labour MP and Cabinet minister
- Susan Kramer, Baroness Kramer, Liberal Democrat peer and former Liberal MP
- Nigel Lawson, British former Conservative MP and former Chancellor of the Exchequer
- Peter Mandelson, British Labour politician, former Secretary of State for Business, Enterprise and Regulatory Reform, and former EU Commissioner
- David Miliband, former British Labour MP, former Foreign Secretary and older brother of Ed Miliband
- Ed Miliband, British Labour MP, Foreign Secretary and former Leader of the Labour party
- Rhodri Morgan, former Labour AM and former First Minister for Wales
- Len Murray, former General Secretary of the Trades Union Congress
- Neil O'Brien, British Conservative MP
- Lord Longford (1905–2001), prison reform advocate and politician
- Brian Paddick, former Metropolitan Police Service deputy assistant commissioner and Liberal Democrat politician
- James Purnell, former British Labour MP and Secretary of State for Work and Pensions
- Tim Rathbone, British former Conservative MP
- Mark Reckless, former British UKIP and Conservative MP
- Rachel Reeves, British Labour MP and Chancellor of the Exchequer
- Emma Reynolds, British Labour MP
- Barbara Roche, former British Labour MP
- Siôn Simon, former British Labour MEP and MP
- Jacqui Smith, former British Labour MP and Home Secretary
- John Spellar, former British Labour MP
- Rory Stewart, British diplomat, academic, writer and former Conservative Party MP
- Will Straw, British policy researcher and Labour politician
- Rishi Sunak, British Conservative former Prime Minister and former Chancellor of the Exchequer
- Matthew Taylor, former British Liberal Democrat MP
- Nick Thomas-Symonds, British Labour MP
- Liz Truss, former British Conservative Prime Minister and former Foreign Secretary
- Stephen Twigg, Director of the Foreign Policy Centre and former Labour MP
- Andrew Tyrie, former British Conservative MP and current Chairman of the Competition and Markets Authority
- Kitty Ussher, former British Labour MP
- Steve Webb, former British Liberal Democrat MP
- Helen Whately, British Conservative MP
- Ann Widdecombe, former British Conservative MP and former Brexit Party MEP
- David Willetts, former British Conservative MP
- Shirley Williams, former Labour Cabinet minister and co-founder of the Social Democratic Party
- Harold Wilson, former British Labour Prime Minister
- Stewart Wood, Baron Wood of Anfield, British Labour Peer
- Yuan Yang, British Labour MP and journalist
- George Young, former British Conservative MP
- Baroness Young, British Conservative politician and first female Leader of the House of Lords

== Non-UK politicians ==
- Tony Abbott, 28th and former Prime Minister of Australia
- Liaqat Ali Khan, first Prime Minister of Pakistan
- Solomon Dias Bandaranaike, former Prime Minister of Ceylon
- Benazir Bhutto, former Prime Minister of Pakistan
- Zulfiqar Ali Bhutto, former Prime Minister of Pakistan
- David Boren, former Oklahoma Governor and US Senator
- Kofi Abrefa Busia, former President of Ghana
- Pete Buttigieg, former United States Secretary of Transportation
- Korn Chatikavanij, former Finance Minister of Thailand
- Calvin Cheng, former Singaporean Nominated MP
- Jen Easterly, former United States Director of the Cybersecurity and Infrastructure Security Agency
- Gareth Evans, former Foreign Minister of Australia
- Malcolm Fraser, former Prime Minister of Australia
- Urszula Gacek, Polish Diplomat, former Polish MEP and Senator
- Bob Hawke, former Prime Minister of Australia
- Badruddin Umar, Bangladeshi Marxist theorist, politician, and historian
- Khairy Jamaluddin, Minister of Health of Malaysia
- Imran Khan, Pakistani cricketer and politician, 22nd and former Prime Minister of Pakistan
- Pedro Pablo Kuczynski, former President and former Prime Minister of Peru.
- John Kufuor, former President of Ghana
- Farooq Leghari, former President of Pakistan
- Martin Mansergh, former Irish politician
- Sukhumbhand Paribatra, former Governor of Bangkok
- Kukrit Pramoj, former Prime Minister of Thailand
- Tony Pua, Malaysian blogger and opposition MP
- Radosław Sikorski, Polish politician and journalist, former minister of foreign affairs of Poland and Marshal of the Sejm
- Aung San Suu Kyi, first State Counsellor of Myanmar, 1991 Nobel Peace Prize Laureate
- Chris Thomas, former Isle of Man Minister for Policy and Reform
- Euclid Tsakalotos, finance minister of Greece and the country's chief negotiator with the Troika
- Abhisit Vejjajiva, former Prime Minister of Thailand
- Sim Ann, Senior Minister of State of Singapore
- Parit Wacharasindhu, Thai politician

== Broadcasters, journalists, media (UK) ==
- Jackie Ashley, British broadcast and newspaper journalist
- Zeinab Badawi, British broadcast journalist
- Zanny Minton Beddoes, Editor-in-chief of The Economist magazine
- Jana Bennett, Director of BBC Vision and non-executive director, BBC Worldwide
- Camilla Cavendish, journalist, The Times
- Michael Cockerell, political television documentaries
- Nick Cohen, journalist
- Michael Crick, British journalist, author and broadcaster
- Nick Davies, British investigative journalist
- Evan Davis, British economic journalist
- Rowenna Davis, Labour councillor and "Sunday Politics" pundit
- David Dimbleby, television presenter
- Bill Emmott, journalist
- Stephanie Flanders, former BBC economics editor
- Jonathan Freedland, journalist and broadcaster
- Paul Gambaccini, music journalist and broadcaster
- Carrie Gracie, BBC newsreader
- Tom Gross, journalist and commentator
- Krishnan Guru-Murthy, Channel 4 newsreader
- Guto Harri, former BBC political correspondent and Communications Director for the Mayor of London
- Tim Harford, British economist and journalist
- John Harris, British journalist, writer, and critic
- Julia Hartley Brewer, British journalist and broadcaster
- Mehdi Hasan, British political journalist and host of UpFront on Al Jazeera English
- Afua Hirsch, journalist and lawyer
- Simon Jack, BBC News Business Editor
- Peter Jay, British journalist, economist and diplomat,
- Simon Jenkins, journalist and columnist; former editor of The Times newspaper
- Oliver Kamm, columnist and leader writer for The Times
- Ian Katz, editor of BBC's Newsnight and former deputy editor of The Guardian
- Lucy Kellaway, British journalist, writer and broadcaster
- Tasmin Khan, television newsreader
- Christina Lamb, journalist; foreign correspondent for The Sunday Times
- David Lipsey, Baron Lipsey, British journalist and Labour peer
- Edward Luce, British journalist
- Christopher Meakin, journalist, Financial Times, The Times, Punch: banker at HSBC and JP Morgan
- Seumas Milne, journalist and writer; Executive Director of Strategy and Communications, British Labour Party
- Bronwen Maddox, editor and chief executive of Prospect magazine
- Michael Mosley Medical and scientific broadcaster
- Robert Peston, Former BBC News Business editor, Political Editor, ITV News
- Rebecca Pike, BBC business and economics correspondent
- Lance Price, former BBC journalist and special advisor to Tony Blair
- James Robbins, journalist and former BBC Diplomatic and Royal Editor
- Nick Robinson, journalist and broadcaster; former BBC political editor
- Justin Rowlatt, journalist and news reporter; currently the BBC's Chief Environment correspondent
- Will Self, British journalist and author
- John Sergeant, former BBC political journalist
- Mary Ann Sieghart, British journalist
- Matthew Syed, British journalist and broadcaster
- Manisha Tank, presenter, BBC World News
- Philippa Thomas, BBC presenter
- Emma Tucker, editor, The Sunday Times
- Etienne de Villiers, Former chairman, BBC Worldwide
- Hilary Wainwright, British academic, editor of Red Pepper magazine.
- Andreas Whittam Smith, former editor of The Independent newspaper
- Tom Winnifrith, British former journalist and businessman
- Camilla Wright, a British journalist and one of the founders and owners of the Popbitch newsletter and website
- Toby Young, journalist
- Cindy Yu, journalist
- Henry Zeffman, political journalist

== Others ==
- Riz Ahmed, British-Pakistani rapper, actor and anti-war activist
- David Alderdice, dermatologist, Northern Irish politician and former Lord Mayor of Belfast
- Naomi Alderman, novelist and writer
- Monica Ali, writer
- Tariq Ali, political writer, broadcaster and publisher
- Chris Anderson, curator of the TED Conference
- Maudy Ayunda, Indonesian singer-songwriter and actress
- Richard Barrons, Major General in the British Army
- Ruzwana Bashir, British Pakistani businesswoman, founder and CEO of Peek.com
- Nina Bawden, novelist and children's writer
- Freda Bedi, social worker, writer and Gelongma (nun in Tibetan Buddhism)
- Isaiah Berlin, philosopher
- Tim Besley, economist
- Roy Bhaskar, philosopher
- Stephen Breyer, US Supreme Court Justice
- Julia Bodmer, British geneticist
- Alex Callinicos, Professor of European & International Studies (social theory and international political economy), King's College London
- Justin Cartwright, novelist and dramatist
- Guido Calabresi, American appeal judge and law and economics scholar
- Suma Chakrabarti, former President of the European Bank for Reconstruction and Development
- Vikramaditya Chandra, CEO, NDTV
- Wesley Clark, former US Army General and Supreme Allied Commander Europe for NATO
- Susanna Clarke, British novelist
- Diane Coyle, journalist, economist and vice-chairman of the BBC Trust
- John Crow, fifth Governor of the Bank of Canada
- John Curtice, political scientist and Professor of Politics at the University of Strathclyde
- Ian Davis, former managing director, McKinsey & Co.
- Pete Dawkins, former Heisman Trophy winner
- Nick Denton, CEO of Gawker Media
- Andrew Dilnot, British economist and broadcaster
- Michael Dobbs, British author
- Rose Dugdale, former IRA prisoner and Sinn Féin activist
- Michael Dummett, philosopher
- Paul W. Franks, Professor of Philosophy and Judaic Studies at Yale University
- Atul Gawande, American surgeon and writer
- Norman Geras, British political theorist and academic
- Steve Giddins, British chess player and writer
- Maurizio Giuliano, Italian-British journalist, Guinness record-holder, and UN official
- Matt Golder, political scientist
- Edward Goldsmith, Anglo-French environmentalist
- Andrew Graham, economist
- John N. Gray, philosopher
- Adrian Greenwood, historian and art dealer
- Bo Guagua, son of Chinese ex-politician Bo Xilai and Gu Kailai
- Susan Haack, British philosopher at the University of Miami
- Tony Hall, Director-General of the BBC and former Chief Executive of the Royal Opera House
- Guy Hands, British financier
- Dido Harding, British businesswoman, former chief executive of TalkTalk Group
- Stephen Hester, Chief Executive of RSA Insurance Group
- Christopher Hitchens, English-American author and polemicist
- John Holmes, British diplomat and UN Under-Secretary-General
- Haya Bint Al Hussein, daughter of King Hussein of Jordan, UN messenger of peace
- Walter Isaacson, American writer
- Antony Jenkins, former CEO of Barclays
- Paul Johnson, economist, Director of the Institute for Fiscal Studies
- David Kirk, New Zealand businessman and former All Black
- Girish Karnad, an Indian writer, playwright and screenwriter
- Sanjaya Lall, economist
- Eylon Levy, Israeli government spokesman
- Mark Littlewood, Director General of the Institute of Economic Affairs
- Ken Macdonald, former Director of Public Prosecutions for England and Wales
- Henry Marsh, British neurosurgeon and focus of the documentary film The English Surgeon
- Claire Maxwell, German-Australian academic sociologist
- Stephen McIntyre, author of Climate Audit dedicated to analysing climate data
- Michelle Meagher, competition lawyer
- Max More, British philosopher and futurist
- Rupert Murdoch, Australian-American media mogul
- Anton Muttukumaru, Sri Lankan army officer and diplomat
- Adebayo Ogunlesi, Nigerian businessman
- Nicky Oppenheimer, South African businessman
- Cameron O'Reilly, Irish-Australian businessman
- Nicholas Ostler, British linguist and author
- Ricken Patel, activist and co-founder of online campaigning organisation Avaaz
- Teddy Pilley, linguist and conference interpreter
- Ben Pimlott, historian
- Max Price, vice-chancellor and principal of the University of Cape Town
- Dennis Potter, British television playwright
- Catherine Powell, CEO of Disney Parks, Western Region
- Hugh Quarshie, British actor
- James A Reed, Chairman of the Reed Group
- Olly Robbins, British former senior civil servant and Chief Negotiator for Exiting the European Union
- Peter Robinson, former speechwriter for US President Ronald Reagan and host of television show Uncommon Knowledge
- Joe Roff, Australian rugby player
- Jim Rogers, investor and author
- Jonathan Rowson, Scottish chess grandmaster and three-time winner of the British Chess Championship
- Anthony Seldon, contemporary historian, commentator and political author
- Vikram Seth, Indian novelist and poet
- Stuart Shanker, Distinguished Research Professor at York University
- Jonathan Shaw, British Major general
- Guy Spier, investor, author
- Bob Sternfels, global managing partner at McKinsey & Co.
- Richard Swinburne, philosopher
- Charles Taylor, Canadian philosopher and politician
- Gabriele Taylor, Fellow and Tutor in Philosophy at St Anne's College, Oxford
- Alexander Thynn, Marquess of Bath, British peer, writer and owner of Longleat
- Stephen Tindale, British environmentalist
- Badruddin Umar, Bangladeshi Marxist–Leninist theorist, historian and writer
- Shriti Vadera, Baroness Vadera, Chairwoman of Santander UK
- Chad Varah, founder of the Samaritans
- Florian Henckel von Donnersmarck, film director and screenwriter
- Tom Ward, British actor
- Sundeep Waslekar, Indian thought leader on conflict resolution and global future
- Madeleine Wickham, chick lit author, famous as Sophie Kinsella
- George Will, American political journalist and commentator
- Richard Wollheim, British philosopher
- Mara Yamauchi, British Olympic marathon runner
- Malala Yousafzai, Pakistani activist for female education and youngest Nobel laureate
