= Black's Medical Dictionary =

Medical reference book

- 29th edition, 1971
- Editor: Harvey Marcovitch
- Language: English
- Genre: Medical, dictionaries & terminology
- Published: 1906
- Publication place: United States
- Media type: Print (hardcover)
- Pages: 776 pp (43rd edition)
- ISBN: 978-1-3994-1231-5

Black's Medical Dictionary (43rd ed, 2017, ISBN 978-1-3994-1231-5) is a comprehensive medical dictionary featuring definitions of medical terms, concepts and conditions, published by A & C Black Publishers. It was first published in 1906, and as of 2023 is in its forty-third edition.

It is considered a simplified home reference for medical terms. According to the publisher, It contains over 5000 definitions and descriptions of medical terms and concepts with over 1000 diagrams.

The latest edition contains new and expanded sections on:

- HPV vaccine
- Monoclonal Antibodies
- Fibroid treatment
- Endoscopy and laparoscopy
- Coronary angioplasty
- MRSA and stem cell research

== Publication history ==
On April 1, 2010, Bloomsbury Academic & Professional became the new U.S. publisher of A&C Black titles. Distribution continues through Macmillan Publishers.

== List of editors ==
- John Dixon Comrie
  - 1906 (1st edition) – 1942 (17th edition)
- H. A. Clegg
  - 1944 (18th edition)
- W. A. R. Thomson
  - 1948 (19th edition) – 1984 (34th edition)
- C. W. H. Havard
  - 1987 (35th edition) – 1990 (36th edition)
- Gordon MacPherson
  - 1992 (37th edition) – 2002 (40th edition)
- Harvey Marcovitch
  - 2005 (41st edition) -
