= Ian Davis (businessman) =

English businessman

Sir Ian Davis
- Born: Ian Edward Lamert Davis; 10 March 1951 (age 75); Kent, England
- Education: Balliol College, Oxford (BA, MA)
- Occupation: Businessman
- Known for: Chairman and Managing Director of McKinsey & Company (2003–2009); Chairman of Rolls-Royce Holdings (2013–2021)
- Children: 2
- Relatives: Crispin Davis (brother); Nigel Davis (twin brother)
- Awards: Knight Bachelor (2019)

Sir Ian Edward Lamert Davis Kt (born 10 March 1951) is a British businessman. He served as chairman and Worldwide Managing Director of McKinsey & Company from 2003 to 2009 and as Chairman of Rolls-Royce Holdings from 2013 to 2021. He currently serves as Chairman of Thoughtworks and holds several non-executive directorships.

== Early life and education ==
Davis was born on 10 March 1951 in Kent, England. He is the twin brother of Sir Nigel Davis, a Court of Appeal judge, and the brother of Sir Crispin Davis, former chairman of Reed Elsevier.

Davis studied Philosophy, Politics and Economics at Balliol College, University of Oxford, where he earned his undergraduate and master's degrees.

== Career ==
=== Early career ===
After graduating from Oxford, Davis worked for seven years at Bowater, a British pulp and paper company, before joining McKinsey & Company in 1979.

=== McKinsey & Company ===
Davis spent over 30 years at McKinsey & Company, serving as a consultant to organizations across the private, public, and non-profit sectors. From 1996 to 2003, he was Managing Partner of McKinsey's practice in the United Kingdom and Ireland. During this period, he had oversight responsibility for McKinsey clients and services in Asia, Europe, the Middle East, and Africa, with particular expertise in the consumer products and retail industries.

In 2003, Davis was elected chairman and Worldwide Managing Director of McKinsey & Company, succeeding Rajat Gupta on 1 July 2003. He served in this position until 2009, leading the firm's global operations during a period of significant expansion. Davis retired from McKinsey in 2010 and became Senior Partner Emeritus, a role he continues to hold.

=== Non-executive directorships ===
==== Rolls-Royce Holdings ====
Davis joined the board of Rolls-Royce Holdings as a non-executive director on 1 March 2013 and succeeded Sir Simon Robertson as chairman on 2 May 2013 at the company's Annual General Meeting. He served as chairman until October 2021, leading the board during a period of significant challenges including restructuring efforts and the COVID-19 pandemic's impact on the aviation industry.

==== BP ====
Davis joined the board of BP as a non-executive director on 2 April 2010. He served as Senior Independent Director (Lead Director) from approximately 2014 to December 2020. In 2017, as Senior Independent Director, Davis led the process to identify and appoint BP's next chairman following Carl-Henric Svanberg's announcement of his retirement.

==== Johnson & Johnson ====
In July 2010, Davis was appointed to the board of directors of Johnson & Johnson, where he served as an independent non-executive director until March 2023.

==== Other positions ====
Davis has served as Chairman of Thoughtworks since June 2021. He is a non-executive director of Majid Al Futtaim Group and serves as a senior adviser to Apax Partners and Mubadala Investment Company.

Davis served as a non-executive member of the Cabinet Office Board, including as Lead Non-Executive Board Member from 2015 to 2016. He is a non-executive director of Teach For All, a global network of educational organizations.

== Other activities ==
Davis has been involved with various academic and policy organizations. He served as an Advisory Director of King Abdullah Petroleum Studies and Research Centre and was a member of the President's Council at the University of Tokyo. He is a member of the Chancellor's Court at the University of Oxford and has been affiliated with Chatham House as a Senior Adviser.

== Honours ==
Davis was appointed Knight Bachelor in the 2019 Birthday Honours for services to business.

== Personal life ==
Davis married in 1978 and has two children.

== Selected board positions ==
=== Current ===
- Chairman, Thoughtworks (2021–present)
- Non-Executive Director, Majid Al Futtaim Group
- Senior Adviser, Apax Partners
- Senior Adviser, Mubadala Investment Company
- Non-Executive Director, Teach For All
- Senior Partner Emeritus, McKinsey & Company

=== Former ===
- Chairman, Rolls-Royce Holdings (2013–2021)
- Non-Executive Director, Johnson & Johnson (2010–2023)
- Non-Executive Director, BP (2010–2020)
- Lead Non-Executive Board Member, Cabinet Office (2015–2016)
- Chairman and Worldwide Managing Director, McKinsey & Company (2003–2009)
