= Crispin Davis =

British businessman

Sir Crispin Henry Lamert Davis OBE (born 19 March 1949) is a British businessman who is a non-executive director of GlaxoSmithKline PLC. He is non-executive director of Vodafone Group plc since 28 July 2014. Sir Crispin was the Chairman of StarBev Netherlands BV until 2012 and previously chairman of the board and the chief executive officer of Reed Elsevier Group PLC. He also served as the chief executive officer of Aegis Group PLC from 1994 until 1999. He was a board member at Guinness PLC, and the group managing director of United Distillers from 1990 to 1993. For 20 years, he served at Procter & Gamble, in senior positions in the United Kingdom, Germany, and North America.

A native of Bromley, Greater London, Davis earned a bachelor's degree from Oriel College, Oxford. He was knighted by Queen Elizabeth in the 2004 Birthday Honours for services to the information industry. Davis and his wife, Anne, have three daughters.

He is the brother of former McKinsey & Company managing director Ian Davis and the Appeal Court judge Sir Nigel Davis.
