= Writers' & Artists' Yearbook =

Annual UK directory

The Writers' & Artists' Yearbook is an annual directory for writers and illustrators that offers creative and practical advice on how to give work the best chance at success.

It is published in the UK each July, alongside the Children's Writers' & Artists' Yearbook. The Yearbook contains 100 articles covering every aspect of the publishing world and the paths which creatives can follow to gain entry into it, and more than 4,500 named industry contacts, including agents, publishers, media companies and societies.

In 2007, an associated website, www.writersandartists.co.uk, was launched, which now includes additional articles, interviews and resources and a community forum to connect users. The brand also runs events and masterclasses and offers a series of editorial services including manuscript reviews and edits, consultations and mentoring.

In addition to the annual Yearbooks, Writers' & Artists' also publish a series of companion guides which go deeper into specific areas of publishing.

== History ==
First published in 1906, by Adam & Charles Black, the original Writers' & Artists' Yearbook was an 80-page booklet, costing one shilling. It gave details of seven literary agents and 89 publishers. Articles offering advice first appeared in the 1914 yearbook. It has been published annually since, expanding over time to include information for illustrators, and to adapt to the changing digital landscape of the publishing industry and the rise of self-publishing. A & C Black became part of Bloomsbury Publishing in 2000 and Bloomsbury now publishes the entire collection of Writers & Artists titles and companion guides.

In 2004, Bloomsbury launched the Children's Writers' and Artists' Yearbook, which includes articles and advice specifically focused on the children's book market. It contains articles from a diverse array of successful children's authors across different genres, mediums and age ranges, as well as contact details tailored to the children's publishing industry. In 2007, Writers & Artists launched an associated website. In 2013, Writers & Artists began publishing companion guides alongside the annual Yearbooks focusing on specific areas of writing and publishing.

== Sections and listings ==
The yearbook is divided into the following sections:

- Newspapers and magazines – writing and pitching; regional, national and overseas, syndicates and news agencies
- Books – the publishing process, inspiring writers and writing advice; regional, national and overseas publishers, audio publishers, book packagers and book clubs
- Poetry – publication and performance; publishers and societies
- Screen and audio – film, television, audiobooks and podcasts; production companies
- Theatre – publication, adaptation, reviews and performance; production companies
- Literary agents – purpose, choice and submission; UK, Ireland and overseas agents
- Art and illustration – illustration and photography, portfolios and freelancing; agents, commercial studios and card and stationery publishers
- Societies, prizes and festivals – associations and clubs, prizes and awards and literary festivals
- Self-publishing – pathways, publication and hybrids; book sites, blogs, podcasts, services and providers
- Resources for writers – editing, blogging, indexing, software and glossaries; courses, libraries and writers' retreats
- Copyright and libel information – copyright and licensing
- Finance for writers and artists – earnings, income tax and national insurance.

== Children's Writers' & Artists' Yearbook ==
The Children's Writers' & Artists' Yearbook follows the same structure and includes the same type of information as the original yearbook but is specific to the children's publishing industry. Advice includes topics such as the business of picture books, writing to read aloud, how to deal with difficult topics, creating diverse stories, what is "age appropriate", reinventing classic stories, series fiction and pseudonyms, compelling non-fiction, creating comics and graphic novels, writing for reluctant readers and visiting schools.

== Writers & Artists website ==
The Writers & Artists website brings together information and advice for aspiring writers alongside additional services and a community hub. The self-publishing page is an offshoot of the main website dedicated entirely to presenting users with all of the available self-publishing options and guiding them along the various pathways.

== Writers' & Artists' titles ==
- The Writers' & Artists' Guide to Getting Published by Alysoun Owen
- The Writers' & Artists Guide to Writing for Children and YA by Linda Strachan
- The Writers' & Artists Guide to How to Hook an Agent by James Rennoldson
- The Writers' & Artists' Guide to Self-Publishing
- The Writers' & Artists Guide to How to Write by William Ryan
- The Organised Writer by Antony Johnston
- The Right Word: A Writer's Toolkit of Grammar, Vocabulary and Literary Terms
- Writers on Writing: A Book of Quotations

== See also ==
- Arvon Foundation
