= Stuart Shanker =

Stuart G. Shanker (born October 14, 1952) is a research professor emeritus of philosophy and psychology at York University, the founder/CEO of The MEHRIT Centre, and an author and speaker. He has been called an expert on child self-regulation in schools.

== Education ==
Shanker began his university education at the University of Toronto, Ontario. He won several awards while there, including a scholarship to study at the University of Oxford. While studying at Oxford, he obtained a first in PPE. He completed his Bachelor of Philosophy and Doctor of Philosophy and was awarded the position of postdoctoral research fellow at Christ Church, Oxford. In 1986, he began as an associate professor of philosophy at York University, where he became full professor of philosophy in 1989.

== Books ==
Shanker's books include:

- Self-Reg: How to Help Your Child (And You) Break the Stress Cycle and Successfully Engage with Life (with Teresa Barker, 2016)
- Calm, Alert, and Learning: Classroom Strategies for Self-Regulation (2012)
- El Rizoma de la Racionalidad (with Pedro Reygadas, 2008)
- Early Years Study 2: Putting Science into Action (with James Fraser Mustard and Margaret McCain, 2007)
- Human Development in the 21st Century (edited with Alan Fogel and Barbara J. King, 2007)
- The First Idea: How Symbols, Language, and Intelligence Evolved from our Primate Ancestors to Modern Humans (with Stanley Greenspan, 2004)
- Apes, Language, and the Human Mind (with Sue Savage-Rumbaugh and Talbot Taylor, 1998).

Self-Reg (2016) is a parenting book that explains how to support self-regulation in children by alleviating the negative impact of stress. According to Shanker, many behaviour, mood, emotional, learning and developmental problems are caused or exacerbated by an overactive stress system. Shanker proposes a method, called Self-Reg, for managing stress and energy flow in order to reduce the impact of an overactive stress response system on children's day-to-day functioning and development. The method starts with reframing children's behaviour and emotional problems as stress problems and identifying and reducing stressors in the five domains discussed in Calm, Alert and Learning. The book identifies hidden stressors that affect some children in our society and also discusses the epidemic of stress and anxiety in today's children and parents.

Calm, Alert, and Learning (2012) is a practical guide for educators and parents about the recent research into self-regulation, explaining the crucial difference between self-regulation and self-control. Whereas the latter refers to the effort required to inhibit impulses, the former addresses the causes of those impulses in the first place. The book takes the reader through the five principal domains of self-regulation (physical, emotion, cognitive, social and prosocial) and how stresses unique to each of these domains impact all of the others, creating a multiplier effect. All too often, such stresses result in problems with attention, emotion regulation, or behaviour that are mistakenly seen as due to poor self-control or lack of effort when, in fact, they are the result of a heightened stress load. The reader is presented with practical methods of reducing the respective stresses in a classroom context.
