= John Comrie =

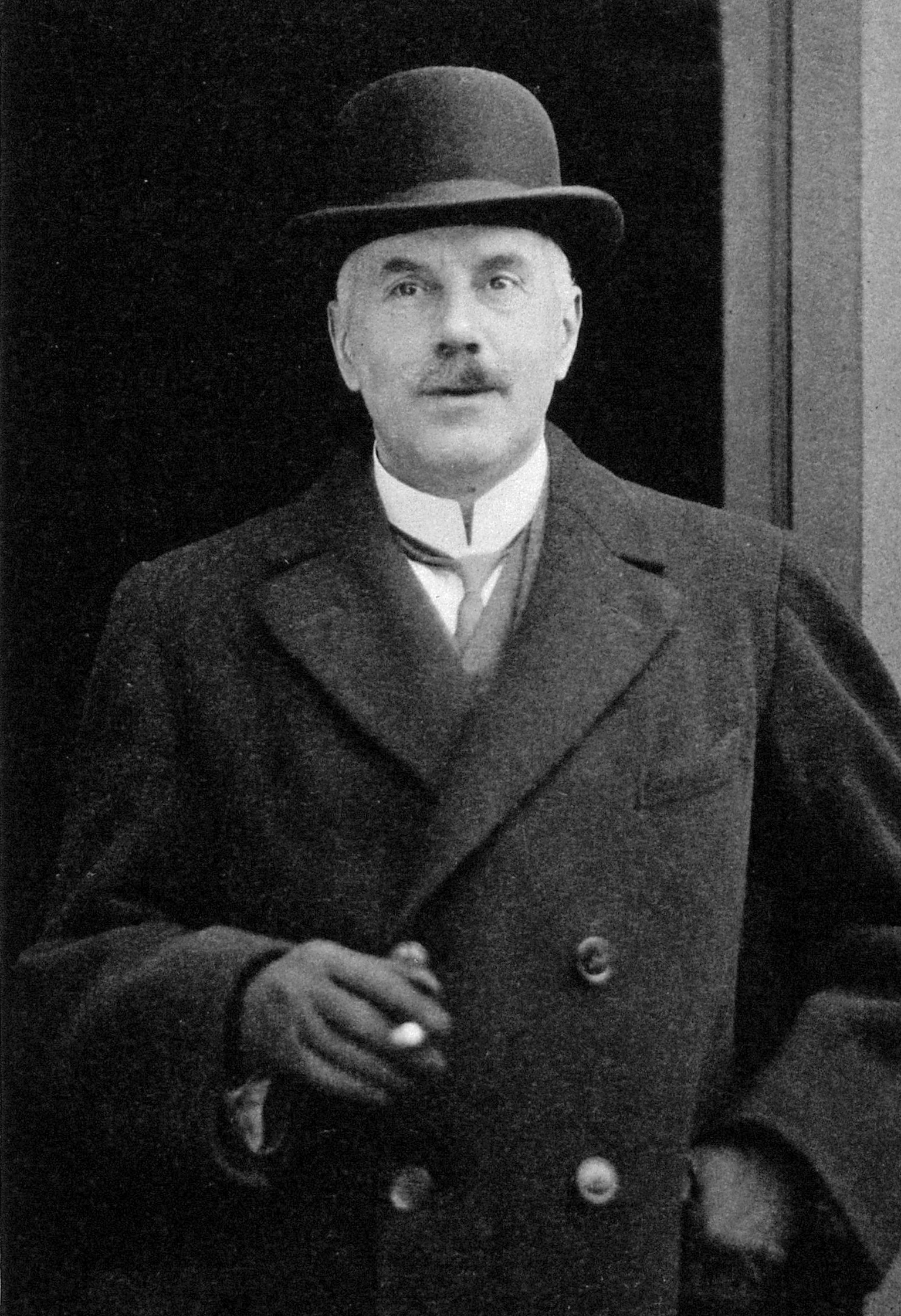
John Dixon Comrie

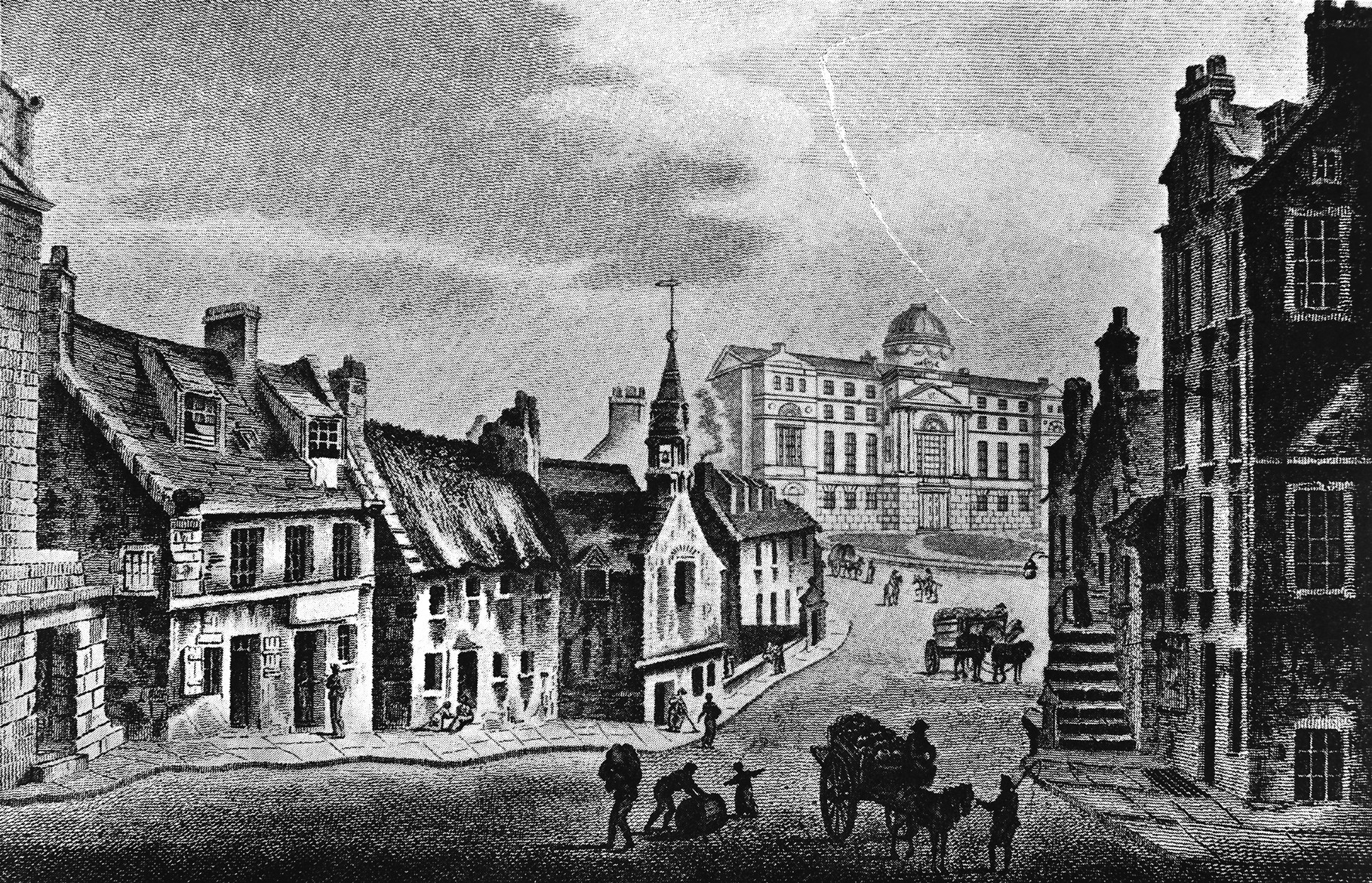
Glasgow Royal Infirmary, from History of Scottish Medicine to 1860 published by Baillière, Tindall & Cox

John Dixon Comrie (28 February 1875 – 2 October 1939) was a Scottish physician, historian of medicine, and the editor of the first edition of Black's Medical Dictionary.

== Biography ==
Comrie studied at George Watson's College and the University of Edinburgh, graduating with M.B. degree and first-class honours in 1899. He became a Fellow of the Royal College of Physicians in 1906 and took a M.D. degree from Edinburgh in 1911, before positions in the Edinburgh and Glasgow Infirmaries. After that he did post-graduate studies in Berlin and Vienna, worked as clinical assistant at the National Hospital in London, and finally settled at Edinburgh, where he became known as pathologist, physician to the Royal Infirmary, and consulting physician to the Deaconess Hospital and the Princess Margaret Rose Hospital for Crippled Children. During World War I he acted as consulting physician to the North Russian Expeditionary Force, reaching the rank of Lieutenant-Colonel.

His father was also John Dixon Comrie (died before October 1939).

In 1929 he was elected a member of the Harveian Society of Edinburgh and in 1932 he was elected a member of the Aesculapian club. In 1933, Comrie authored Diet in Health and Sickness which was positively reviewed in the British Medical Journal as a reliable guide to dietetics for practitioners.

== Selected publications ==
- Black's Medical Dictionary (1906 and later editions)
- History of Scottish Medicine to 1860 (London, Baillière, Tindall & Cox, 1927)
- Diet in Health and Sickness (1933)
- Comrie, John D. (1932). History of Scottish medicine. Vol. 1 (2nd ed.). London: The Welcome Historical Medical Museum.
- Comrie, John D. (1932). History of Scottish medicine. Vol. 2 (2nd ed.). London: The Welcome Historical Medical Museum.
