= A & C Black =

British book publishing company

- Parent company: Bloomsbury Publishing
- Founded: 1807 (219 years ago)
- Founder: Adam Black and Charles Black
- Country of origin: United Kingdom
- Headquarters location: London
- Publication types: books
- Nonfiction topics: reference

A & C Black is a British book publishing company, owned since 2000 by Bloomsbury Publishing. The company is noted for publishing Who's Who since 1849 and the Encyclopædia Britannica between 1827 and 1903. It offers a wide variety of books in fiction and nonfiction, and has published popular travel guides, novels, and science books.

== History ==
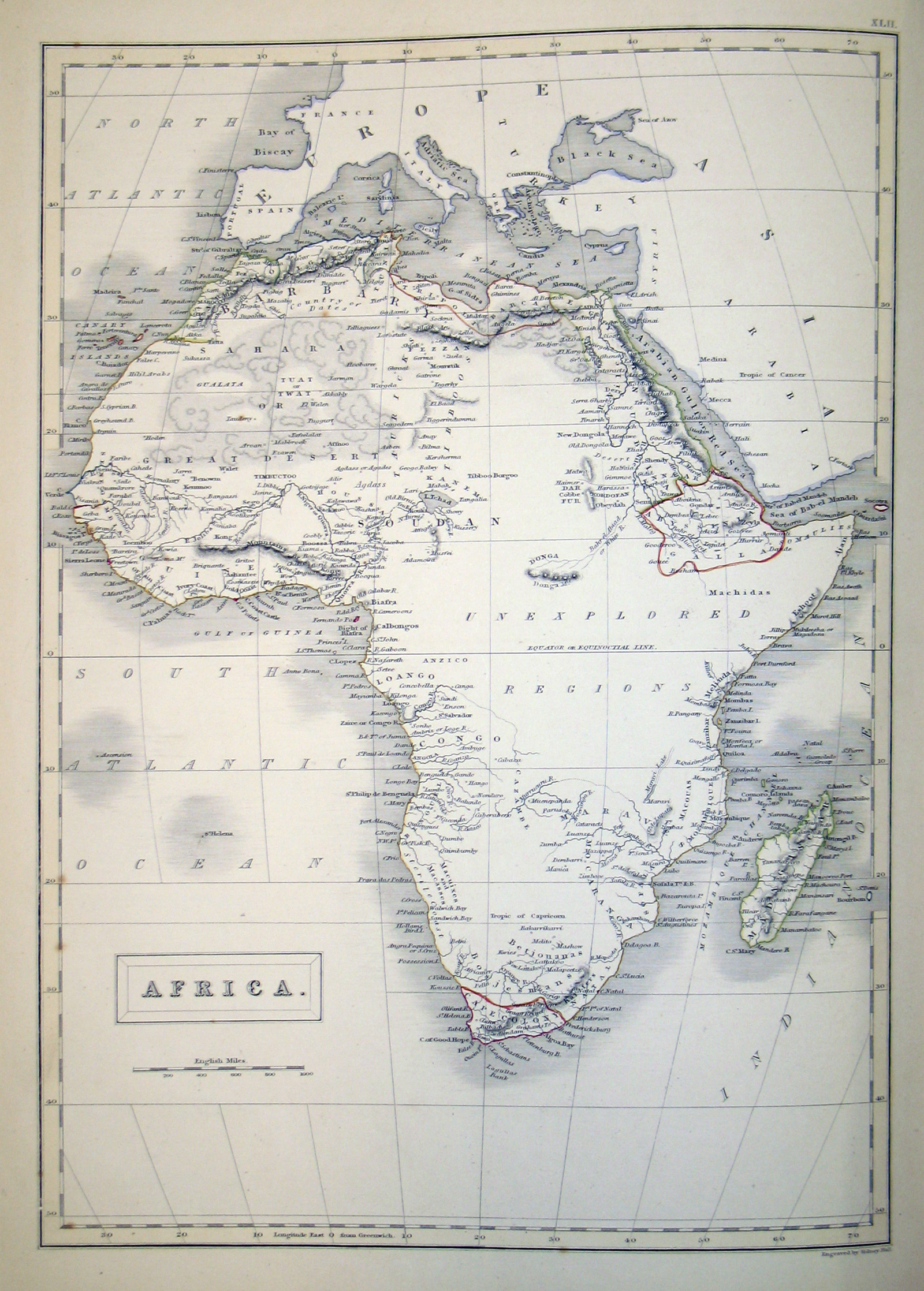
Sidney Hall's 1840 map of Africa, published by Adam and Charles Black

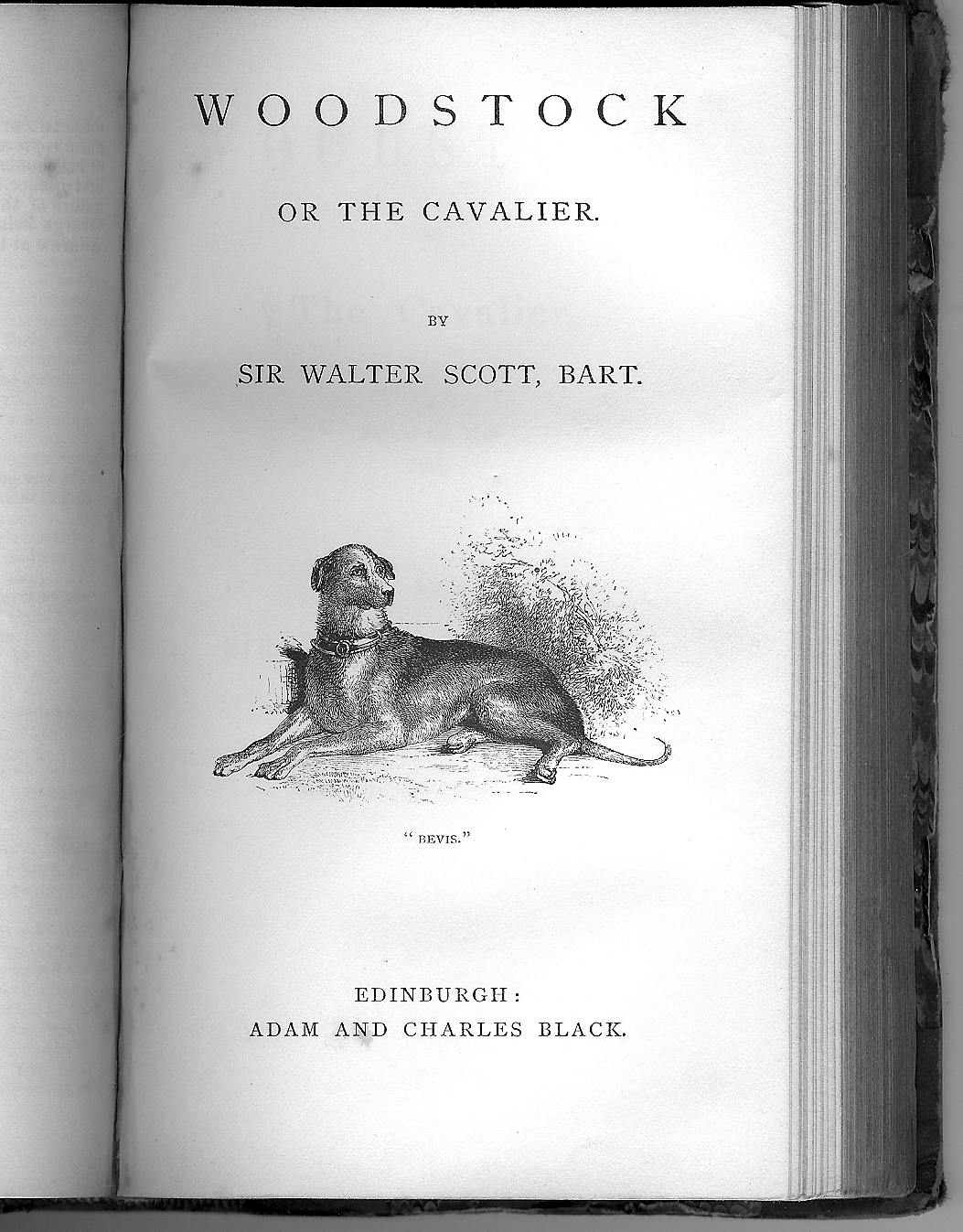
Adam and Charles Black's 1863 edition of Woodstock, by Sir Walter Scott (first publ. 1826)

The firm was founded in 1807 by Charles and Adam Black in Edinburgh. In 1851, the company purchased the copyrights to Sir Walter Scott's Waverly novels for £27,000. The company moved to the Soho district of London in 1889.

During the years 1827–1903 the firm published the seventh, eighth and ninth editions of the Encyclopædia Britannica. This was purchased from Archibald Constable after his company's failure to publish the seventh edition of the encyclopedia. Adam Black retired in 1870 due to his disapproval of his sons' extravagant plans for its ninth edition. This edition, however, would sell half a million sets and was released in 24 volumes from 1875 to 1889.

Beginning in 1839, the firm published a series of travel guides known as Black's Guides.

The company was the publisher of the annual Who's Who (since 1849) and also, since 2002, the Whitaker's Almanack. Other notable works include Black's Medical Dictionary and the Know The Game series of sports rules and laws reference books.

The firm also published the A. & C. Black Colour Books: Twenty Shilling Series (1901–21), a "range of high-quality colour collectable picture books" which are still collected by bibliophiles.

In 1902 they published P. G. Wodehouse's first book, The Pothunters, and went on to produce many of his early works.

In 1989 A & C Black purchased both Christopher Helm Publishers and later the Pica Press, publishers of the Helm Identification Guides, from Christopher Helm.

In 2000 A & C Black was purchased by Bloomsbury Publishing Plc, which continued producing the former's range of reference works.

In June 2002, T. & A. D. Poyser and their back-list of around 70 ornithology titles were acquired from Elsevier Science.

A & C Black purchased Methuen Drama from Methuen Publishing in 2006, and acquired Arden Shakespeare from Cengage Learning in 2008.

In 2016, A & C Black Music list moved to Collins Learning, a division of HarperCollins Publishers Ltd.

== Notable books ==
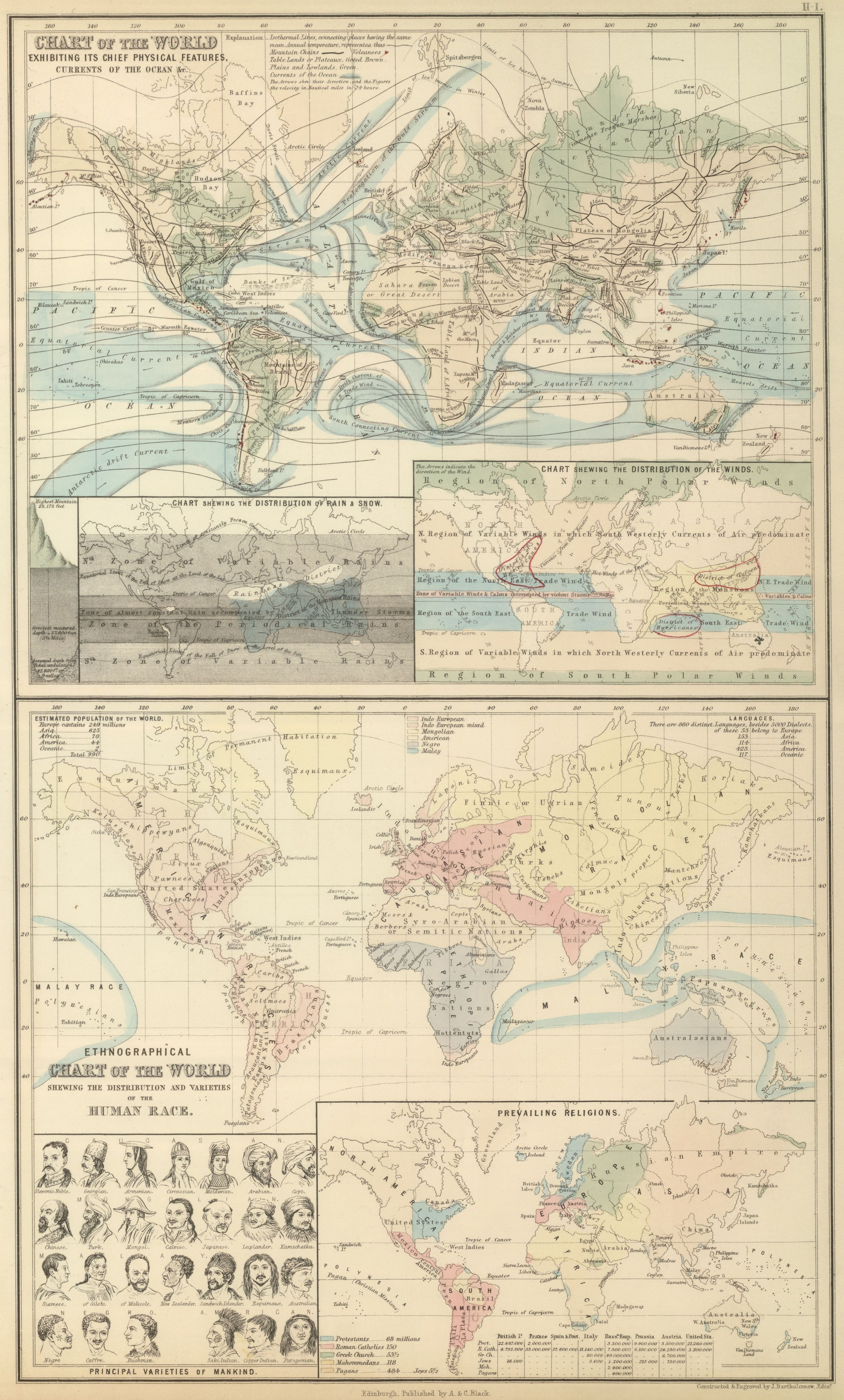
World maps from A & C Black's 1854 General Atlas Of The World

- Black's Medical Dictionary
- Whitaker's Almanack
- Who's Who
- Wisden Cricketers' Almanack
- Writers' & Artists' Yearbook

== Book series ==
- Black's Atlas of North America, 1856
- Artist's Sketch Book Series
- Ballet Pocket Series (Newman Wolsey; then: A. & C. Black)
- Black's Guides
- Black's Junior Reference Books
- Black's Novel Library
- Black's Popular Series of Colour Books
- Black's School History
- Black's "Water-colour" series
- Colour Books: The 7s. 6d. Net Series
- Colour Books: The 6s. Net Series
- Colour Books: The 10s. Net Series
- Colour Books: The 20s. Net Series
- Dancers of To-day
- Ecclesiastical History of England (General Editor: J. C. Dickinson)
- The Fascination of London
- Guild Text-books
- How-and-Why Series
- Know the Game
- The Making of the Nations
- Peeps at Ancient Civilisations
- Peeps at Great Cities
- Peeps at Great Explorers
- Peeps at Great Men
- Peeps at Great Railways
- Peeps at History
- Peeps at Industries
- Peeps at Many Lands
- Peeps at Nature
- Peeps at Nature for Little Children
- Peeps for Little People
- The Peeps Series (sometimes called: Miscellaneous Peeps series)
- Social Life in England

== Imprints ==
- Adlard Coles Nautical
- Arden Shakespeare
- Andrew Brodie Publications
- Featherstone
- Methuen Drama
- T. & A. D. Poyser
- Reeds Almanac
- John Wisden & Co
