= Michelle Meagher =

British lawyer and author

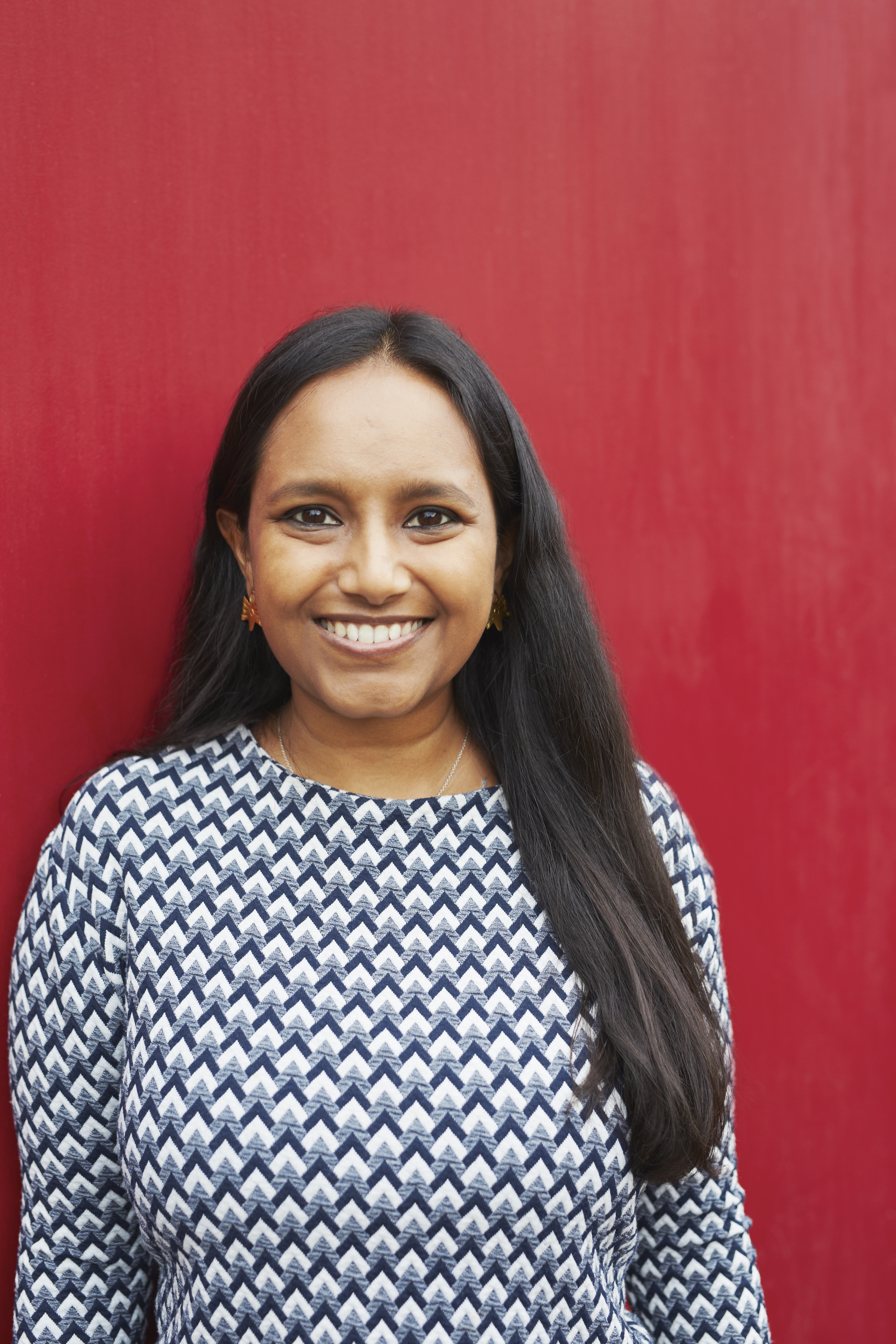
- Michelle Meagher in 2018
- Education: Oxford University, Georgetown University
- Occupations: competition lawyer, campaigner
- Website: michellemeagher.com

Michelle Meagher is a British lawyer, author and campaigner. Meagher is advocating for an overhaul of competition policy away from the Chicago School antitrust consumer-centered paradigm.

== Early life and education ==
Meagher was born in the UK. She is British of Bangladeshi origin. Her parents wanted her to become a medical doctor. Meagher chose instead to study Philosophy, politics and economics at Oxford University and competition law at Georgetown University.

After her studies she worked as competition lawyer for Magic Circle law firms.

In 2013, Meagher was emotionally affected by the Rana Plaza tragedy, in which an eight-story commercial building collapsed in the Bangladesh capital Dhaka, killing over 1,100 people, principally garment factories workers. Meagher's maternal family came from Dhanmondi area of Dhaka, situated close to the district where Rana Plaza was once located and Meagher identified with the victims of the tragedy.

As an M&A lawyer facilitating mergers between large companies, Meagher was confronted with a crisis of consciousness. She saw irresponsible corporate governance structures resulting from unfettered competition for profits as the ultimate reason behind the Rana Plaza tragedy. Consequently, Meagher quit her job with a renowned multinational law firm.

== Anti-monopoly work ==
In 2020, Meagher published the book Competition is Killing Us, in which she argues for a redesign of competition law to control the power of Big Tech.

Meagher repeatedly called out the concentration of corporate power. She called for more regulatory intervention to rebalance the interests of shareholders with the interests of citizens, such as mandatory sharing of anonymized data by Big Tech companies with their smaller competitors.

In 2021, Meagher co-founded the European anti-monopoly organisation Balanced Economy Project, with the journalist Nicholas Shaxson.

Meagher is a senior policy fellow at the Centre for Law, Economics and Society, University College London (UCL). She a co-founder of the think tank Inclusive Competition Forum.

Meagher's contribution to the anti-monopoly movement has been likened to Lina Khan in the US, among other antitrust legal scholars.

== Corporate accountability ==
Shareholder primacy is one myth of free markets that Meagher discussed in her work. She suggested to revisit the rules of corporate governance to ensure a greater alignment of companies' behavior with broader society goals and with environmental sustainability requirements.
