= Miles Weatherall =

British pharmacologist (1920–2007)

- Born: 1920
- Died: 2007 (aged 86–87)
- Occupation: Pharmacologist
- Employer: London Hospital Medical College

Professor Miles Weatherall (1920-2007) was a British pharmacologist.

He studied medicine at Oriel College, qualifying in 1943.

He was Professor of Pharmacology at London Hospital Medical College, University of London (1958 to 1966), and subsequently Professor Emeritus; Head of Therapeutics Research Division and a director of the Wellcome Research Laboratories, from 1967 to 1975.

He also served as a Medicines Commissioner from 1979 to 1981, as editor of the British Journal of Pharmacology, and was a contributor to New Scientist. and to The Oxford Illustrated Companion to Medicine.

He was married to the former Josephine Ogston, who collaborated with him, and also conducted research on fetal physiology, medical statistics and health services research, becoming a founding member and project leader for international initiatives. They had three children.

== Works ==
- Hanley, T.; Udall, V.; Weatherall, M. (197). "An industrial view of current practice in predicting drug toxicity". British Medical Bulletin. 26 (3): 203–207. doi:10.1093/oxfordjournals.bmb.a070783. PMID 4924386.
