= Edward Monro =

Victorian High Churchman and writer

- Born: 1815
- Died: 1866 (aged 50–51)
- Occupation: Church of England Priest
- Period: 1842–1866
- Subject: Education, parochial work, High Church principles
- Notable works: The Dark River (1845), Parochial Work (1850), A few words on the spirit in which men are meeting the present crisis in the Church (1850), Reasons for Feeling Secure in the Church of England (1850), Pastoral Life (1862), Church Principles, Bible Principles (1864).
- Notable awards: .

Edward Monro (1815–1866) was an English priest, educator and religious writer. He was a defender of the Church of England and the founder of a Tractarian College. He was the incumbent of Harrow Weald from 1842 to 1860 and the Vicar of St John the Evangelist, Leeds, from 1860 to 1866.

== Early life ==
Edward Monro was born in the St Giles area of London on 18 January 1815, probably at 64 Gower Street. His father, Edward Thomas Monro, was a physician who specialised in treating mental illness. His mother, Sarah, was the daughter of Samuel Compton Cox.

The year after Monro's birth, his father was appointed physician to the Bethlem Hospital, taking over from his own father, Thomas Monro. As a boy, Monro sat at the feet of Turner. When he was thirteen, he began a night school for young people and visited the sick and elderly. This act of charity was an early sign of his life's work.

Monro attended Harrow School, and in 1832, entered Oriel College, Oxford, where he obtained a third-class B.A. degree in 1836, followed by an M.A. in 1839. The Tractarianism that prevailed in the college affected him profoundly. In 1863, he recalled how one or two teachers at Oriel had introduced him to the system of the "Everlasting Catholic Church."

On 3 October 1837, Monro married Emma Hay at St James' Chapel, Edinburgh. Born and brought up in India, she was the daughter of John Hay, a former member of the East India Company's Madras Medical Board.

== Career ==
In April 1838, Monro was ordained deacon and appointed assistant curate at Harrow, where he worked under John Cunningham, vicar from 1811 to 1861. In December 1838, Monro was ordained priest. Monro primarily looked after Harrow Weald, a rural hamlet with a population of about 1,100 and a small wooden chapel. In 1839, he was licensed as a curate at Harrow Weald and in 1842, Cunningham appointed him as the perpetual curate. In 1845, Harrow Weald became a separate parish, and over the next four years, Monro organised the creation of a new church, burial ground, schoolhouse, and parsonage.

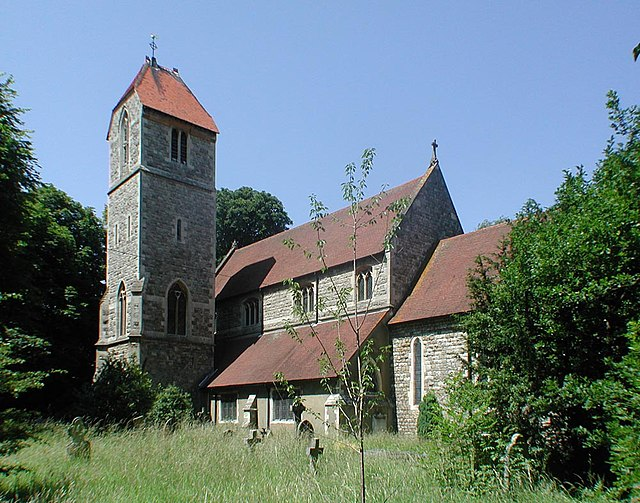
All Saint's, Harrow Weald, 2002 (by John Salmon).

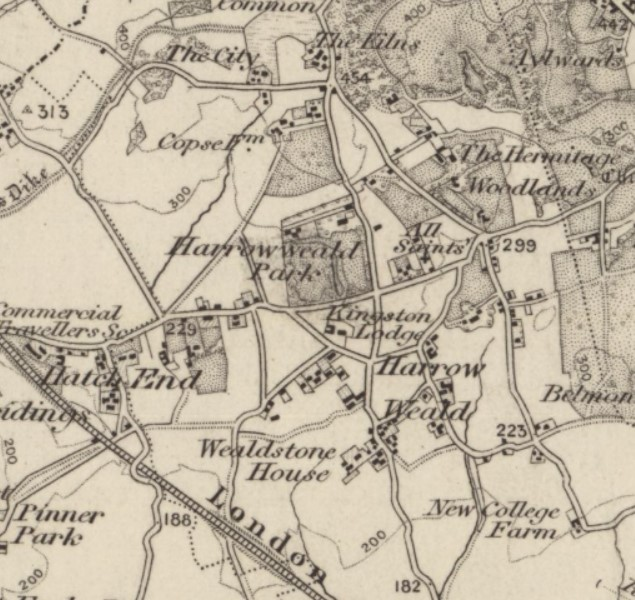
Ordnance Survey map of Harrow Weald surveyed 1862 to 1871 ((Reproduced with the permission of the National Library of Scotland).

On 1 July 1846, Archdeacon Manning laid the first stone of a new church, which was consecrated by the Bishop of London on 1 November 1849. As this was All Saints Day, the new church was called "All Saints". At All Saints, Monro's worship included daily services, weekly communion, a surpliced choir, and a purple altar cloth.

In 1840, Monro helped his brother Theodore find cottages at Harrow Weald to use as a convalescent home for paupers. This home was the beginning of the Metropolitan Convalescent Institution. The following year, the charity moved to larger premises at Carshalton.

In 1840, Monro bought "a row of cottages, which he turned into a continuous line of dormitories and offices." He added a hall, chapel, and library to form the other three sides of the square. Philip Hardwick designed the hall; William Butterfield designed the chapel and library. The college was a semi-monastic institution designed to provide a free, scholarly education to boys from poor backgrounds who wished to pursue careers in the church or as schoolmasters. In a fund-raising circular dated 28 May 1846. Monro stated that the college was to be run "on the basis of Catholic customs" and that the boys were to "live in close spiritual communion with himself", "observe rules of silence," and "to attend and assist in the various ministrations of the Church." He estimated that maintaining a school for twenty boys would cost £500 per annum. The college officially opened on 1 July 1846 with an initial intake of sixteen students. Thomas Mozley described it as a "little paradise" for "the transmutation of raw ploughboys into sweet choristers and good scholars."

While people on the High Church wing of the Church of England praised the college, evangelicals were hostile. One newspaper called it a "semi-Popish seminary", and the Vicar of Harrow, the staunchly evangelical John Cunningham, was "deeply distressed" when the college opened.

In August 1852, the college had "died a natural death." The reason for its collapse was financial. Without an endowment, it depended wholly on donors. Monro lacked financial discipline. Although he envisaged twenty boys, he had twenty-five by 1847 and thirty by 1848. Furthermore, in 1851, he took half the boys on a trip to Switzerland. The closure of the college left Monro with personal debts and probably damaged his health. In October 1853, he resigned from his appointment as one of the select preachers chosen to address the University of Oxford.

Monro believed that young men were vulnerable to vice and immorality as they made the transition from school to the workplace. In Agricultural Colleges and their workings, he advocated the creation of communities to educate rural youths intellectually, morally, and spiritually.

Monro was a diligent and conscientious parish priest. At Harrow Weald, he systematically visited people in their homes and built relationships with them. He believed that through "personal intercourse" with his parishioners, a priest would gain their confidence such that they would confess their sins. He also visited agricultural workers in the fields and railway navvies in their temporary lodgings.

Monro was an "earnest and eloquent preacher." From 1850 onwards, he preached at the opening of many new churches and schools around England, including at Plymouth (1850), Hemel Hempstead (1855), Whitwick (1857), and Derby (1859). He believed that the Church of England should respond to the threat of increasing secularism and rationalism by training more and better priests. From 1857 onwards, he was an active member of the Society for Promoting the Employment of Additional Curates in Populous Districts and often preached at their meetings. On 19 December 1861, in London, he gave a talk on secularism to the Additional Curates Society.

=== Teaching and writing ===
From 1855, Monro gave lectures on poetry, art, history and current affairs at literary institutes, libraries, and schools in towns and cities all over England. During 1858, he often performed a story called "The Tale of the Cotton Gown" about how a factory hand's bad habits led to domestic misery and the death of his wife.

Monro was a prolific author, publishing more than fifty titles. His first book was Stories of Cottagers, published under the name "A Country Parson" in 1842 and then his own name in 1843. It was the first of many books intended to convey religious instruction to the poor using stories and allegories.

In 1848, he published sermons on the ministry and an open letter to Gladstone about education.

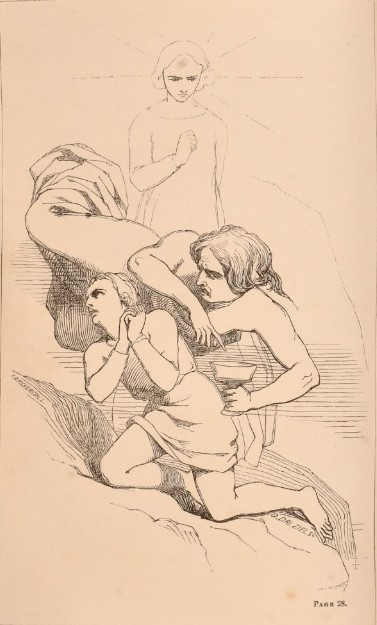
The Dark River, 1845, illustration by George Dalziel. "As he touched the stream the Being laughed aloud, and held up the cup before him of which he had once drunk..."

In 1850, he responded to the crisis caused by the Gorham judgement by writing two books in defence of the Church of England (A few words on the spirit in which men are meeting the present crisis in the Church and Reasons for feeling secure in the Church of England).

Monro drew on his experience as a priest at Harrow Weald to write a manual for parish priests entitled Parochial Work. In 1850, he published Agricultural Colleges and their workings. A letter addressed to A J B Hope Esq. M.P.

In August 1852, Monro published The Christian Student, an educational magazine aimed at older children. Although Monro planned to publish it monthly, no more appeared. In 1857 and 1858, he published a series of tracts called The Church and the Million about how the Church should minister to various groups of labourers, including railway navvies, haymakers, and factory workers.

== Later career ==
When the living of St John the Evangelist, Leeds, became vacant, Monro applied and was awarded the post on 12 March 1860. A newspaper article sought to alleviate possible fears: "Mr Monro has usually been associated with the High Church party, but he is not a man of extreme views."

After he was offered the position, he discovered that his stipend was the subject of a legal dispute. Although he was inducted at Leeds on 8 June 1860, his move there hung in the balance until August. His stipend was eventually set at £500 per annum with an additional £100 for a curate and £100 for accommodation. In November 1860, he told a group of mill workers, "He had for many years past had a great desire to come north...he felt that the men he wished to spend his life amongst were the working populations of the great northern towns of England."

At St John's, he established day schools, boosted the number of communicants and confirmation candidates, and revived the practice of Whitsuntide processions. He also set up a brotherhood and sisterhood of lay helpers. In November 1863, he told an audience he had 13 young working men and 11 "sisters" working in his parish. An article of late 1863 says, "He is an immensely busy man, and as voluble as he is busy...And you might see him with gown over his arm and college cap on his head, hurrying, almost flying up a crowded thoroughfare, with a tail of choristers and curates, and ...banneret and crucifix, to take his stand on a large open moor at the back of a public-house, a place of great resort."

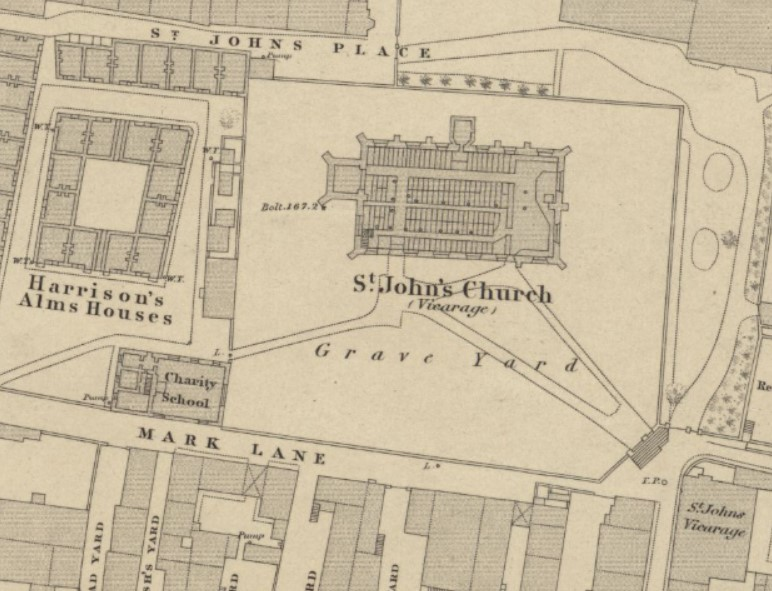
Ordnance Survey map of St John's, Leeds, surveyed 1847 (Reproduced with the permission of the National Library of Scotland).

In March 1864, his bishop forced him to take down pictures he had put in the church.

In June 1861, a soiree held at the Leeds Music Hall for Monro and his wife attracted 600 people. On going to Leeds, Monro became active as a lecturer in the city, giving talks on art, literature, history, international relations, housing, and prisons. He spoke the international exhibition of 1862, the royal wedding of 1863, and the display of William Holman Hunt's picture, "The Finding of the Saviour in the Temple," at a local gallery.

On 9 July 1862, Monro and 300 members of the Leeds Working Men's Institution went on a four-day trip to the capital to visit the International Exhibition of Industry and Art and other places of interest. Two weeks later, at the Victoria Hall, he gave a talk about the trip to more than 2,000 people. He also lectured on the social problems of his day. On 3 December 1860, at the Music Hall, he gave a lecture entitled "On the Present Condition and Future Prospects of the Working Classes in our Manufacturing Districts," in which he told his largely working-class audience that "ever since he was a youth, he had longed to be the personal friend of the working classes." He then discussed the importance of "mutual good feeling between employers and employed" and the need for working men to possess more self-respect and a greater appreciation of the benefits of education. At the same venue on 19 December 1860, he lectured on "The Homes of England," in which he highlighted the causal link between unsanitary housing and immoral and criminal behaviour.

In December 1860, Monro agreed to attend court to hear rules approved by masters and men. When, in August 1864, he lectured to striking metal workers at the Leeds Stock Exchange on "the relation between masters and men," he left in a hurry when he suspected the chairman was about to criticise one of the masters. In 1861, Monro came up with the idea of having an institution for working men not catered for by the Mechanics Institute. It opened in July 1861 and proved highly popular.

Soon after arriving in Leeds, he tried to launch two monthly magazines. Monro's Monthly Tales, published in November 1860, folded after the first issue. The Church Sunday School Magazine, which was supposed to start in January 1861, was probably never printed. As John Bull said after his death, "his rapid power of conception led him to initiate more plans of work than were good either for himself or his people."

Most of his publications during this period were stories like Eustace (1863) and Pascal the Pilgrim (1864). Pastoral Life. Part1. The Clergyman at Home and in the Pulpit, published in 1862, was a substantial work. The "Story of the Cross" probably belongs to this period. After his death, it was set to music by Sir John Stainer and Arthur Somervell, and featured in Easter celebrations up until at least the 1950s.

In November 1863, Monro delivered the first of a series of lectures by High Anglicans at Ipswich and Norwich. In his lecture, entitled "Church Principles, Bible Principles," he avowed his membership of "the Everlasting Catholic Church." He then discussed certain principles of High Churchmanship, namely "a definite and a developed creed," the veneration of martyrs, brotherhoods and sisterhoods, the sacramental system, and the practice of daily prayer and weekly offertory. He also spoke about "the pure and refining influences of high art." His lecture was published in 1864. Near the end of his life, he published "The Church in Great Provincial Towns", an article which advocated the creation of town bishoprics to coordinate pastoral work.

== Illness and death ==
Although Monro professed to like Leeds, the work and environment were detrimental to his health. When, in September 1861, the living at Harrow became vacant on the death of the Rev. Cunningham, he applied for the position but was unsuccessful.

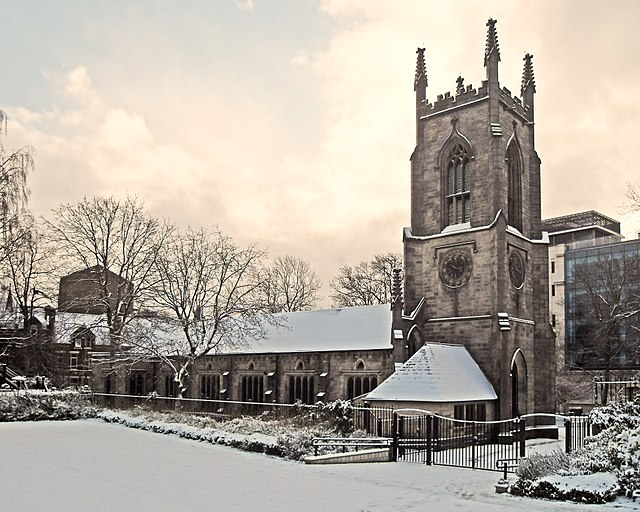
St John's, Leeds, 2009

In December 1864, Monro was given a leave of absence from his duties for two years and went to live in the south of England. At the end of that time, he returned to Leeds but was too ill to participate actively in services. He died at the Vicarage on 13 December 1866, aged 51. His funeral service was held at St John's Church on 19 December, and his body was then taken by train to Harrow Weald for burial.

By his will, Monro left the whole of his estate, valued at "under £3,000," to his widow, Emma. She retired to an almshouse at 37 College, Bromley, Kent, where she died on 19 December 1887, aged 71.

After his death, his Leeds parishioners collected money for a stained-glass window in his memory. This window was designed by Ward and Hughes of London and placed in the southeast corner of the chancel.

== Works ==
This list has been compiled from the University of Cambridge's online catalogue and Allibone's Critical Dictionary of English Literature.

- Stories of Cottagers, James Burns, 1842.
- Wandering Willie: the Sponsor. James Burns, 1845.
- Dermot the Unbaptized, James Burns, 1845.
- On Private Baptism, James Burns, 1845.
- The Baptismal Service, James Burns, 1845.
- The Dark River: an Allegory. James Burns, 1845.
- The Vast Army: an Allegory. James Burns, 1847.
- The Combatants: an Allegory. Joseph Masters, 1848.
- The Fulfilment of the Ministry: a Sermon, Preached before Some Clergy of the Diocese of Worcester. John Henry Parker, 1848.
- Harry and Archie; or, First and last communion, Joseph Masters, 1848.
- Education: Its True Province the Formation of Individual Character: a Letter to William Ewart Gladstone. John Henry Parker, 1849.
- The Revellers, The Midnight Sea and The Wanderer: Three Allegories. Joseph Masters, 1849.
- A Tabular View of English History, Joseph Masters,1849.
- Sermons Principally on the Responsibilities of the Ministerial Office. John Henry Parker, 1850.
- A Few Words on the Spirit in Which Men Are Meeting the Present Crisis in the Church. Parker, 1850.
- Purity of Life: a Sermon Preached in the Parish Church to the Boys of Uppingham Grammar School, on the Feast of St. Bartholomew, MDCCCXLIX. John Henry Parker, 1850.
- Parochial Work. John Henry Parker, 1850.
- Reasons for Feeling Secure in the Church of England: a Letter to a Friend, in Answer to Doubts Expressed in Reference to the Claims of the Church of Rome. John Henry Parker, 1850.
- Agricultural Colleges and Their Working: a Letter to A.J.B. Hope, Esq., M.P. John Henry Parker, 1850.
- True Stories of Cottagers, new ed. Joseph Masters, 1850.
- Parochial Work. 2nd ed., John Henry Parker, 1851.
- The Christian Student, an educational magazine, No. 1, 1852.
- The Parish: in Five Books. John Henry Parker, 1853.
- The Church and the Million. [No. I]. Joseph Masters, 1854.
- Walter, the Schoolmaster. Joseph Masters, 1854.
- The Journey Home: an Allegory, Joseph Masters, 1854.
- Basil, the schoolboy; or, The heir of Arundel, Joseph Masters, 1854.
- Practical sermons on the characters of the Old Testament, Joseph Masters, Issued in parts 1854–58.
- Midsummer Eve. Joseph Masters, 1855.
- Leonard and Dennis: or, The Soldier's Life: a Tale Intended to Illustrate Some of the Leading Features of the Present War. Joseph Masters ..., 1855.
- Daily Studies During Lent. J.H. and J. Parker, 1856.
- Parochial Lectures on English Poetry, Rivingtons, 1856.
- Parochial Papers for the Clergyman, the Schoolmaster, and the Family, Rivingtons, 1856.
- Plain Sermons on the "Book of Common Prayer," 1856, (by Monro et al.)
- School Prayers for the Ecclesiastical Year, 1856.
- Home and Colonial Missions: Two Sermons. Joseph Masters, 1857.
- The Church and the Million. No. II, The "navvies," and How to Meet Them: a Letter to a Friend. Joseph Masters, 1857.
- The Dark Mountains; Being the Sequel to The Journey Home. An Allegory. Joseph Masters, 1858.
- The Church and the Million, No. 4. Haymakers and their habits; a letter to a friend. Joseph Masters, 1858.
- The Church and the Million. The collier and the operative, and how to affect them. Joseph Masters, 1858.
- Historical and Practical Sermons on the Sufferings and Resurrection of Our Lord, J H and James Parker, 1858 (by Monro and "One of the writers of the Tracts for the Christian seasons").
- Sacred Allegories of Christian Life and Death, Joseph Masters, 1858.
- Tales for the Million, No. 1, Dick the Haymaker, Joseph Masters, 1859.
- Tales for the Million, No. 2. Walter the Convict, Joseph Masters (1859).
- Tales for the Million, No. 3. Edward Morris, Joseph Masters (1859).
- Tales for the Million, No. 4. The Tale of a Cotton Gown, Joseph Masters (1859).
- Nanny: a Sequel to "Harry and Archie" Joseph Masters, 1859.
- The Church and the Million, No. 5, Durham and the carpet weavers. Masters and man: A letter addressed to Messrs Henderson and Co., Joseph Masters, 1859.
- Monthly Tales (a magazine), 1860.
- Pastoral Life. Part I. The Clergyman at Home and in the Pulpit, Hammans, 1862.
- Claudian, a Tale of the Second Century. Part I. Joseph Masters, 1862.
- Illustrations of Faith. 1862 (by Monro and "One of the writers of the Tracts for the Christian seasons").
- Eustace; or, the Lost Inheritance: a Tale of School Life. Joseph Masters, 1863.
- Pascal the Pilgrim: a Tale for Young Communicants. J. Masters, 1864.
- Church Principles, Bible Principles / by Edward Monro. Mowbray, 1864.
- Leila: a Tale. Joseph Masters; B. W. Sharp, 1864.
- Joey: or, the Tale of an Old Coat. Joseph Masters, 1865.
- "The Boy Martyr of Rome" published in the Sunday Magazine, March 1866.
- "Tarcisius, the Child Martyr", published in the Monthly Packet, May 1866.
- "The Church in Great Provincial Towns", published in The Churchman's Family Magazine, October 1866.
- Footprints in the Snow: a Tale. Joseph Masters, 1867.
- Edwin's Fairing. Alexander Strahan, 1867

Allibone's Critical Dictionary of English Literature also attributes the following titles to Monro, but these have not been verified:

- Fables, Stories and Allegories, 1842.
- A View of the Parochial System, 1850.
