= Camilla Wright =

British journalist

- Born: 4 December 1970 (age 55)
- Occupation: Media owner/consultant
- Notable credit: Popbitch

Camilla Wright (born 4 December 1970) is a British journalist and one of the founders (with then boyfriend Neil Stevenson) and owners of the Popbitch newsletter and website. In 2008 she published a book, Popbitch: Celebrity Excess And Other Monkey Business.

She graduated with a degree in PPE from Oriel College, Oxford in 1992. Before starting university and Popbitch her first job was as a bar promoter in Tenerife. In January 2007 she appeared in the Radio 4 Great Lives series, nominating American war correspondent Martha Gellhorn. In 2011, Wright appeared to give evidence for the Leveson Inquiry into the Culture, Practices and Ethics of the Press. On 21 December 2015, Wright represented Oriel College on the BBC television show Christmas University Challenge.

== Selected publications ==
- Wright, Camilla (2008). Popbitch: Celebrity Excess And Other Monkey Business. London: Century. ISBN 978-1-84605-382-5.
