= Nigel Davis =

British judge (born 1951)

The Right Honourable Sir Nigel Davis
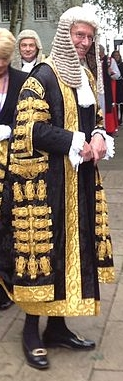
- In procession in ceremonial dress at Llandaff Cathedral in 2013

Lord Justice of Appeal
- In office 4 October 2011 – 10 March 2021

Justice of the High Court
- In office 2001–2011

Personal details
- Born: 10 March 1951 (age 75)

Sir Nigel Anthony Lamert Davis, PC (born 10 March 1951) is a former Lord Justice of Appeal.

== Education ==
Davis was educated at Charterhouse School and University College, Oxford.

== Career ==
Davis was called to the Bar (Lincoln's Inn) in 1975. In 1992, he became a Queen's Counsel. He was appointed a Recorder in 1998. The next year, he was named a Deputy High Court Judge. Davis was appointed to the High Court of Justice on 1 October 2001 and assigned to the Queen's Bench Division; he was knighted the same year. He served as a Presiding Judge for the Wales Circuit from 2006 to 2009. In 2011, he was appointed a Lord Justice of Appeal effective 4 October 2011, and it was announced he would receive the customary appointment to the Privy Council. He retired as Lord Justice of Appeal with effect from 10 March 2021.
