= Gordon MacPherson =

British pathologist (died 2021)

Dr George Gordon MacPherson was Reader in Experimental Pathology, Turnbull Fellow, Tutor in Medicine, and Senior Tutor at Oriel College, Oxford. He held a Bachelor's degree (B.M.), Master's degree (M.A.) and a doctorate (D.Phil.). His research interests were in Cell Biology, Pathology, and Immunology. Medically qualified, he researched in the field of cellular immunology at the Sir William Dunn School of Pathology, University of Oxford.

He is recognized for his "pioneering work" on the modulation of the adaptive immune response by sub-populations of antigen-presenting dendritic cells, including a sub-population of dendritic cells which presents self-antigens derived from apoptotic gastrointestinal epithelial cells and helps maintain self-tolerance. This contrasts with the role of other dendritic cells in presenting pathogen-derived antigens in order to activate specific anti-pathogen T-cell and B-cell responses.

He died on 14 November 2021.

== Publications ==
As at December 2021, his ten most cited research publications are:

- Huang, Fang-Ping; Platt, Nicholas; Wykes, Michelle; Major, James R.; Powell, Timothy J.; Jenkins, Christopher D.; MacPherson, G. Gordon (7 February 2000). "A Discrete Subpopulation of Dendritic Cells Transports Apoptotic Intestinal Epithelial Cells to T Cell Areas of Mesenteric Lymph Nodes". Journal of Experimental Medicine. 191 (3): 435–444. doi:10.1084/jem.191.3.435. PMC 2195813. PMID 10662789. Cited 766 times.
- MacPherson, GG; Warrell, MJ; White, NJ; Looareesuwan, S; Warrell, DA (June 1985). "Human cerebral malaria. A quantitative ultrastructural analysis of parasitized erythrocyte sequestration". The American Journal of Pathology. 119 (3): 385–401. PMC 1888001. PMID 3893148. Cited 706 times.
- Damoiseaux, JG; Döpp, EA; Calame, W; Chao, D; MacPherson, GG; Dijkstra, CD (September 1994). "Rat macrophage lysosomal membrane antigen recognized by monoclonal antibody ED1". Immunology. 83 (1): 140–7. PMC 1415006. PMID 7821959. Cited 482 times.
- Wykes, M; Pombo, A; Jenkins, C; MacPherson, GG (1 August 1998). "Dendritic cells interact directly with naive B lymphocytes to transfer antigen and initiate class switching in a primary T-dependent response". Journal of Immunology. 161 (3): 1313–9. PMID 9686593. Cited 360 times.
- Hume, D A; Robinson, A P; MacPherson, G G; Gordon, S (1 November 1983). "The mononuclear phagocyte system of the mouse defined by immunohistochemical localization of antigen F4/80. Relationship between macrophages, Langerhans cells, reticular cells, and dendritic cells in lymphoid and hematopoietic organs". Journal of Experimental Medicine. 158 (5): 1522–1536. doi:10.1084/jem.158.5.1522. PMC 2187139. PMID 6355361. Cited 297 times.
- Liu, L M; MacPherson, G G (1 May 1993). "Antigen acquisition by dendritic cells: intestinal dendritic cells acquire antigen administered orally and can prime naive T cells in vivo". Journal of Experimental Medicine. 177 (5): 1299–1307. doi:10.1084/jem.177.5.1299. PMC 2191013. PMID 8478609. Cited 264 times.
- Pugh, CW; MacPherson, GG; Steer, HW (1 June 1983). "Characterization of nonlymphoid cells derived from rat peripheral lymph". Journal of Experimental Medicine. 157 (6): 1758–1779. doi:10.1084/jem.157.6.1758. PMC 2187049. PMID 6854208. Cited 263 times.
- MacPherson, GG; Jenkins, CD; Stein, MJ; Edwards, C (1 February 1995). "Endotoxin-mediated dendritic cell release from the intestine. Characterization of released dendritic cells and TNF dependence". Journal of Immunology. 154 (3): 1317–22. PMID 7822800. Cited 207 times.
- Huang, Fang-Ping; Farquhar, Christine F.; Mabbott, Neil A.; Bruce, Moira E.; MacPherson, G. Gordon (1 January 2002). "Migrating intestinal dendritic cells transport PrPSc from the gut". Journal of General Virology. 83 (1): 267–271. doi:10.1099/0022-1317-83-1-267. PMID 11752724. Cited 168 times.
- Mabbott, Neil A.; MacPherson, G. Gordon (March 2006). "Prions and their lethal journey to the brain". Nature Reviews Microbiology. 4 (3): 201–211. doi:10.1038/nrmicro1346. PMID 16462753. S2CID 23126939. Cited 160 times.
