= Popbitch =

Music and dating website

- Company type: Nonprofit
- Website type: News Celebrity
- Available in: English
- Website: popbitch.com
- Commercial: Yes
- Current status: News-in media

Popbitch is a weekly UK-based celebrity and pop music newsletter and associated dating website from the early 2000s. Much of the material for the newsletter comes from the Popbitch message boards, frequented by music industry insiders, gossips and the casually interested. The board has at various times been credited for celebrity rumours (both false and true) appearing in the press, and the coining of many expressions that have gone on to enjoy wider usage.

== History ==
The website was an early example of satirical and irreverent UK gossip sites that skirted the limits of defamation law. The uncompromisingly cruel humour gave it a feel somewhat similar to Usenet gossip newsgroups.

Popbitch was founded and is owned and run by Neil Stevenson and Camilla Wright, both journalists. Wright is employed full-time to run Popbitch. Stevenson is still a director, but his active participation in the project has diminished. Originally published privately as a weekly pop music email from the www.popbitch.demon.co.uk address, Popbitch has been published from popbitch.com since March 2000, and by Popdog Limited since 2001. Stevenson was employed by the British publishing house EMAP on various entertainment titles, including the celebrity magazine Heat and as editor of The Face.

== Editorial style of the newsletter ==
The newsletter is aimed principally at a British audience and is published weekly, usually on a Thursday. It usually contains celebrity-based stories relating to music, film, television and sport, with quirky stories from other fields.

The newsletter usually contains, in order:

- a short quote from a celebrity
- some advertising
- several multiple-paragraph stories separated by single-sentence stories or facts
- some advertising
- a section entitled Big questions with one or more allegations about unidentified celebrities presented in the form of questions
- a series of webpage links entitled Things To Make You Go Hmm
- predictions of the position of some artists in the UK singles chart for the week ahead
- some advertising
- some more advertising
- a Help Popbitch appeal for gossip or money or presents
- an End Bit section where contributors are thanked, usually by initials or messageboard identity
- the Old Jokes Home usually a topical joke
- and one or more web links headed Still Bored?
- some advertising

== Famous nicknames on Popbitch ==
- Fat Dancer (sometimes shortened to FD) = Robbie Williams (from a comment by Noel Gallagher, describing Williams as "the fat dancer from Take That")
- ChazBaps = Billie Piper
- Derek and Victoria, Thick and Thin = The Beckhams
- Skeletor = Victoria Beckham
- Rhombus Face = Sophie Ellis-Bextor
- Jeremy ***** = Jeremy Clarkson
- Sir JingleJangle = Jimmy Savile

== Cultural impact ==
By 2003, Popbitch had moved from a niche-market publication to mainstream cultural knowledge, thanks in part to its role in assisting British tabloid newspapers with their entertainment coverage. It achieved frequent name-checks in newspaper "diary" columns, and from celebrities as diverse as Madonna and French and Saunders.

It played some part in popularising terms such as Croydon (or council) facelift, "gak" (meaning cocaine), and "pramface" (a term of abuse contracted from "a face more suited to pushing a pram around a council estate").

It gained a reputation as being first with a number of celebrity-based stories. One poster reported David Beckham's move from Manchester United to Real Madrid at least four months before sports pages picked up on the story — then stood by the story in the face of repeated denials. It was also the first to report on the name of Madonna's son, Rocco.

Some of the contributors to the Popbitch messageboards have also become minor celebrities in their own right. When one, who posted as Reverend_Goatboy, died in July 2007, his death was noted in The Times.

== Controversy and criticism ==
The website was one of the first websites to detail accusations of necrophilia and child sexual abuse by Jimmy Savile during his lifetime.

False allegations against Jeremy Clarkson, a British TV celebrity, and David Beckham were published on the Popbitch messageboards by its users. This led to legal action against the site's owners. The messageboard was closed and reopened with board members as editors. The editors have the ability to modify or delete anything libellous or "not pop or bitch", and the board also employs automatic censors that prevent the names of certain celebrities from appearing. Despite these precautions Popbitch was once again in the news after being successfully sued by Max Beesley in March 2008 over an allegation about his personal life.

== Diversification ==
From mid-2007, Popbitch's owners sought to broaden the appeal of the brand by launching Popbitch-themed and endorsed products. Camilla Wright said this diversification was necessary as, with simply a gossip website and email, it was "harder to maintain a niche because everybody is doing it".

Among the first new sites launched was Popbets, a reality TV gambling site, in 2007, and this was followed in February 2008 by Radio Popbitch. Wright has also stated her aim to move into Popbitch-branded offline publishing, and web TV.

== See also ==
- List of satirical news websites
