= Philosophy, politics and economics =

Interdisciplinary academic degree

Philosophy, politics and economics, or politics, philosophy and economics (PPE), is an academic degree that combines study from three subjects. The first institution to offer degrees in PPE was the University of Oxford in the 1920s. The Oxford PPE course has produced many notable graduates, including numerous British politicians and leaders of other countries. PPE degrees began to be offered at other universities in the 1980s and are now offered at many colleges and universities around the world.

== History ==
Philosophy, politics and economics was established as a degree course at the University of Oxford in the 1920s, as a modern alternative to classics (known as "literae humaniores" or "greats" at Oxford) for those entering the civil service. It was thus initially known as "modern greats". The first PPE students commenced their course in the autumn of 1921. Initially it was compulsory to study all three subjects for all three years of the course, but in 1970 this requirement was relaxed, and since then students have been able to drop one subject after the first year – most do this, but a minority continue with all three.

The philosopher Roy Bhaskar, who studied PPE at Oxford in the 1960s, subsequently described the course content at that time as follows:

I suppose the basis of PPE was very much laid in the work of John Stuart Mill, who was an adept at all three. The ideal was to become, more or less, a modern equivalent to Mill. There was very little discussion of Hegel and Marx, who certainly weren't recognised as major thinkers. Most people who did well in philosophy wouldn't even have done any Kant. It was sufficient to do Descartes, Locke, Berkeley and Hume, that was it... for economics you had to do basic neo-classical and Keynesian economic theory and problems in the British economy since the war.

During the 1960s some students started to critique the course from a left-wing perspective, culminating in the publication of a pamphlet, The Poverty of PPE, in 1968, written by Trevor Pateman, who argued that it "gives no training in scholarship, only refining to a high degree of perfection the ability to write short dilettantish essays on the basis of very little knowledge: ideal training for the social engineer". The pamphlet advocated incorporating the study of sociology, anthropology and art, and to take on the aim of "assist(ing) the radicalisation and mobilisation of political opinion outside the university". According to Andy Beckett, in response, some minor changes were made, with influential leftist writers such as Frantz Fanon and Régis Debray being added to politics reading lists, but the core of the programme remained the same. However, Bhaskar, another leader of the movement to reform PPE, argued that within a couple of years of the publication of the critique, "...the structure of PPE had been transformed. You could now do sociology, you could do Hegel, you could do Marx, continental philosophy, and these were permanent effects at the Oxford undergraduate level".

Christopher Stray has pointed to the course as one reason for the gradual decline of the study of classics, as classicists in political life began to be edged out by those who had studied the modern greats.

Political theorists Dario Castiglione and Iain Hampsher-Monk have described the course as being fundamental to the development of political thought in the UK since it established a connection between politics and philosophy. Previously at Oxford, and for some time subsequently at Cambridge, politics had been taught only as a branch of modern history.

From the 1980s, PPE degrees were introduced in other universities, such as at the University of York in 1986. However, the Oxford PPE remained dominant in British politics in the 21st century, despite PPE degrees being introduced by universities such as Durham and Lancaster as well as York, and similar programmes being available at Cambridge. This has been attributed to the self-perpetuating nature of its reputation for producing top politicians. By 2020, a century after its introduction, the degree had spread to 33 universities in the UK and to a total of 172 institutions in 33 countries around the world.

== Course material ==
The programme is rooted in the view that to understand social phenomena one must approach them from several complementary disciplinary directions and analytical frameworks. In this regard, the study of philosophy is considered important because it both equips students with meta-tools such as the ability to reason rigorously and logically, and facilitates ethical reflection. The study of politics is considered necessary because it acquaints students with the institutions that govern society and help solve collective action problems. Finally, studying economics is seen as vital in the modern world because political decisions often concern economic matters, and government decisions are often influenced by economic events. The vast majority of students at Oxford drop one of the three subjects for the second and third years of their course. Oxford now has more than 600 undergraduates studying the subject, admitting over 200 each year.

== Reception ==
Oxford PPE graduate Nick Cohen and former tutor Iain McLean consider the course's breadth important to its appeal, especially "because British society values generalists over specialists". Academic and Labour peer Maurice Glasman noted that "PPE combines the status of an elite university degree – PPE is the ultimate form of being good at school – with the stamp of a vocational course. It is perfect training for cabinet membership, and it gives you a view of life". However, he also noted that it had an orientation towards consensus politics and technocracy. According to Bhaskar, the course "was designed to turn you into a top-class civil servant, able to turn your hand to any brief or service the empire in a variety of roles".

Geoffrey Evans, an Oxford fellow in politics and a senior tutor, critiques that the Oxford course's success and consequent over-demand is a self-perpetuating feature of those in front of and behind the scenes in national administration, in stating "all in all, it's how the class system works". In the current economic system, he bemoans the unavoidable inequalities besetting admissions and thereby enviable recruitment prospects of successful graduates. The argument itself intended as a paternalistic ethical reflection on how governments and peoples can perpetuate social stratification.

Stewart Wood, a former adviser to Ed Miliband who studied PPE at Oxford in the 1980s and taught politics there in the 1990s and 2000s, acknowledged that the programme has been slow to catch up with contemporary political developments, saying that "it does still feel like a course for people who are going to run the Raj in 1936... In the politics part of PPE, you can go three years without discussing a single contemporary public policy issue". He also stated that the structure of the course gave it a centrist bias, due to the range of material covered: "...most students think, mistakenly, that the only way to do it justice is to take a centre position".

== See also ==
- Literae Humaniores
- Philosophy and economics
- List of University of Oxford people with PPE degrees
