= Regius Professor of Hebrew (Oxford) =

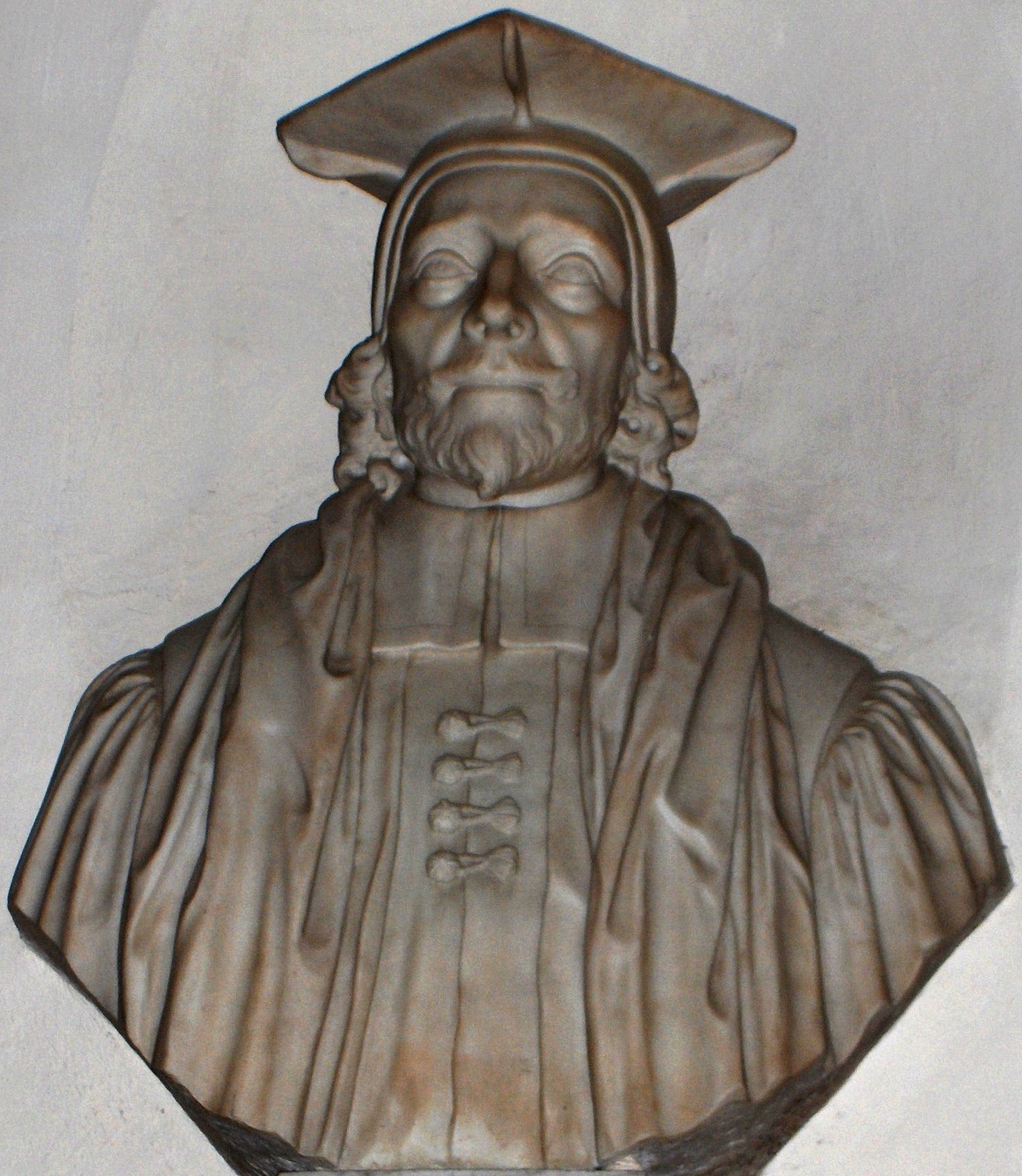
Edward Pococke, bust in the cathedral of a 17th-century professor

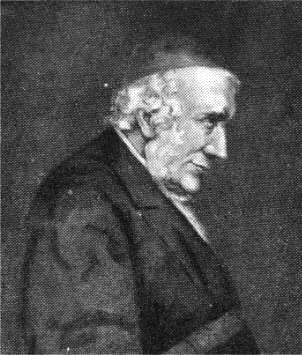
Edward Bouverie Pusey, professor for more than fifty years, 1828 to 1882

The Regius Professorship of Hebrew in the University of Oxford is a professorship at the University of Oxford, founded by Henry VIII in 1546.

In 1630, through the influence of William Laud, Archbishop of Canterbury, a canonry of Christ Church was perpetually annexed to the professorship.

== List of Regius Professors ==
Incomplete list:

- 1546 or 1547 Thomas Harding
- 1548 Richard Bruerne
- 1559 Thomas Neale
- 1569 Thomas Kingsmill
- 1591 John Harding
- 1598 William Thorne
- 1604 John Harding (again)
- 1610 Richard Kilby
- 1621 Edward Meetkerke
- 1626 John Morris
- 1648 Edward Pococke
- 1691 Roger Altham
- 1697 Thomas Hyde
- 1702 Roger Altham (again)
- 1715 Robert Clavering
- 1747 Thomas Hunt
- 1774 Richard Brown
- 1780 George Jubb
- 1787 Benjamin Blayney
- 1802 Joseph White
- 1814 Richard Laurence
- 1822 Alexander Nicoll
- 1828–1882 Edward Bouverie Pusey
- 1883 Samuel Rolles Driver
- 1914 G. A. Cooke
- 1934 Godfrey Rolles Driver (acting)
- 1936 Herbert Danby
- 1954 Cuthbert Aikman Simpson
- 1959 Sir Godfrey Rolles Driver (acting, second term)
- 1960 William Duff McHardy
- 1978–1989 James Barr
- 1992–2014 Hugh G. M. Williamson
- 2014–2020 Jan Joosten

Godfrey Rolles Driver twice served as acting professor during vacancies, in 1934–1935 and 1959–1960. However, he was not eligible to hold the chair outright, as he was a layman and the chair was attached to an Anglican canonry of Christ Church, requiring the holder to be in holy orders. The university statutes were changed in 1960 to allow William McHardy, a Church of Scotland layman, to be appointed.

The term of Jan Joosten was ended on 3 July 2020 in the wake of criminal charges for possessing images of child sexual abuse.
