= George Jubb =

George Jubb (1717–1787) was an Anglican priest.

Jubb was born in York and educated at Christ Church, Oxford. He was Chaplain to William Wentworth, 2nd Earl of Strafford then served a curacy at St Thomas the Martyr, Oxford. He held incumbencies at Cliffe until 1751; and at Chenies and Todington after 1751. He was also Chaplain to Thomas Herring, Archbishop of York then Canterbury from 1743 to 1757. He was appointed Archdeacon of Middlesex in 1779; Regius Professor of Hebrew at Oxford in 1780; and Chancellor of the Diocese of York in 1781.

He died on 12 November 1787.

== Notes ==
Church of England titles
Academic offices
Preceded by Richard Brown	Regius Professor of Hebrew; University of Oxford; 1780 to 11787	Succeeded by Benjamin Blayney
Preceded by John Hotham	Archdeacon of Middlesex; 1780–1781	Succeeded by Stephen Eaton
