= Thomas Neal =

Thomas Neal may refer to:

- Thomas Neal (baseball), American baseball player
- Thomas Neal (Hebraist), English churchman and academic
- Thomas Neal (industrialist), American industrialist
- Tom Neal, American actor

== See also ==
- Thomas Neale, English project-manager and politician
- Thomas Neill (disambiguation)
