= Jan Joosten (biblical scholar) =

Biblical scholar and convicted sex offender

- Born: 17 May 1959 (age 67); Ekeren, Belgium
- Criminal charges: Possession of images and videos of child pornography
- Criminal penalty: One year in prison

Ecclesiastical career
- Religion: Christianity
- Church: United Protestant Church in Belgium

Academic background
- Education: Princeton Theological Seminary; Hebrew University of Jerusalem

Academic work
- Discipline: Biblical studies
- Institutions: University of Strasbourg; Christ Church, Oxford

Jan Joosten (born 17 May 1959) is a Belgian biblical scholar, former pastor, and convicted sex offender. From 2014 to 2020, he was Regius Professor of Hebrew at the University of Oxford. He was previously, and then concurrently, a professor at the University of Strasbourg, a position he started in 1994 and maintained alongside his chair in Oxford. In June 2020, he was found guilty of possessing child pornography, and was dismissed from his chair at Oxford. He retired from his Strasbourg position in 2021.

== Career ==
His areas of interest are the Septuagint, Syriac versions of the Bible, a biblical manuscript found at Qumran, and the Diatessaron. He is considered one of the most distinguished biblical scholars of his generation.

Joosten obtained a licentiate in theology in Brussels (1977–81) followed by a Master of Theology (ThM) degree at Princeton Theological Seminary (1981–82). He then earned two doctorates, one in Semitic languages at the Hebrew University of Jerusalem (1982–88) and another in theology, again in Brussels (1988–94). He received a French habilitation through Strasbourg (1994).

After these qualifications, Joosten worked as Professor Old Testament at a school of theology in Butare, Rwanda. He then served as a pastor for six years in Belgium and worked at the Brussels Faculty for Protestant Theology. From 1994 to 2004, he was Professor of Biblical Philology in Strasbourg; from 2004 to 2021, he was Professor of Old Testament in Strasbourg. From 2014 to 2020, Joosten held his chair in Oxford.

He was, until June 2020, also a member of the Society of Biblical Literature. Joosten was president of the International Organization for Septuagint and Cognate Studies. As of 3 July 2020, Joosten was no longer employed by the University of Oxford nor was he a trustee of Christ Church, and he was no longer affiliated in any way with the institution.

Joosten maintained his position at Strasbourg during his time in Oxford and returned to it once dismissed. He retired, after serving his sentence, in 2021.

== Child pornography conviction ==
On 18 June 2020, Joosten was sentenced by the Saverne (he lives in the Bas-Rhin region) criminal court to one year in prison and placed on the sex offender registry in France for holding 27,000 images and one thousand videos of child pornography, including images of children being raped. Joosten admitted to offences dating from 2014 to May 2020 after being exposed by Strasbourg LION (laboratoire d’investigation opérationnelle du numérique) as part of a lengthy investigation. Joosten downloaded the images over a six-year period. He was 'relieved to be arrested'. He described his addiction to pornographic images and videos of children as a "secret garden" that contradicted who he is as a person.

On his conviction, he was not immediately incarcerated. His sentence would be supervised, and he would have to complete a three-year programme of treatment. He was prohibited from any activity bringing him into contact with minors. Joosten has four children.

Rémi Gounelle, the Dean of the Faculté de théologie protestante de Strasbourg, released this statement following Joosten's arrest:

Nous sommes tous tombés de haut. Il n'y avait aucune suspicion de ce genre, aucun problème avec les étudiants. C'est une affaire moralement très choquante mais qui ne remet pas en cause les grandes compétences pédagogiques et scientifiques de Jan Joosten. C’est surtout profondément triste. Jan est tombé dans une forme d'addiction dont il n'a pas réussi à sortir. Il luttait contre ses pulsions négatives sans parvenir à y échapper. Cela nous montre la complexité de l’être humain. Jan est un collègue très apprécié et il vivait avec ça. Cela rend humble de découvrir cette addiction, cette fragilité.

Gounelle argued that, whilst the unmasking of Joosten as a paedophile was deeply shocking, it does not call into question his pedagogical and scientific skills.

In a public statement that noted his "shocking crimes and... the suffering endured by those in the images he accessed," the University of Oxford announced Joosten's removal from employment.

Joosten continued to have a role at Strasbourg, however, which lasted until 2021.

== Works ==
- "The Syriac Language of the Peshitta and Old Syriac Versions of Matthew. Syntactic Structure, Inner-Syriac Developments and Translation Technique", Studies in Semitic Languages and Linguistics 22 (Leiden, Brill, 1996)
- "People and Land in the Holiness Code. An Exegetical Study of the Ideational Framework of the Law in Leviticus 17–26", Supplements to Vetus Testamentum 67 (Leiden, Brill, 1996)
- "Édition (avec Ph. Le Moigne) des actes du colloque Aspects de la Bible grecque", dans la Revue des Sciences Religieuses 280 (1999), pp. 132–228.
- En collaboration avec Eberhard Bons et Stephan Kessler, Les Douze Prophètes. Osée, La Bible d'Alexandrie 23, 1 (Paris, Cerf, 2002).
- "The Dura Parchment and the Diatessaron", Vigiliae Christianae, 57, (2003), 159–175.
- "En collaboration avec Philippe Le Moigne, L'apport de la Septante aux études sur l'Antiquité". Actes du colloque de Strasbourg 8 et 9 novembre 2002, Lectio Divina 203 (Paris, Cerf, 2005).

== See also ==
- Dura Parchment 24
