= William McHardy =

The Reverend William McHardy
- Born: William Duff McHardy; 26 May 1911
- Died: 9 April 2000 (aged 88)
- Other name: W. D. McHardy
- Spouse: Vera Kemp (m. 1941–1984)
- Children: One
- Awards: DD (1958); CBE (1990)

Academic background
- Education: Fordyce Academy
- Alma mater: University of Aberdeen; University of Edinburgh; St John's College, Oxford
- Thesis: A preparation for an edition of a critical text of the Syriac version of Ecclesiasticus (1943)

Academic work
- Discipline: Biblical languages
- Sub-discipline: Syriac; Aramaic; Hebrew
- Institutions: University of Birmingham; University of London; University of Oxford
- Notable works: New English Bible; Revised English Bible

William Duff McHardy, CBE (26 May 1911 – 9 April 2000) was a Scottish scholar of Biblical languages. From 1960 to 1978, he was Regius Professor of Hebrew at the University of Oxford. He contributed to the New English Bible, and was director of the Revised English Bible.

== Early life ==
McHardy was born on 26 May 1911 in Cullen, Banffshire, Scotland, the son of Alexander S. McHardy, a schoolmaster. He was educated at Fordyce Academy, a school in Fordyce, Aberdeenshire, that became known as the "Eton of the North", where his father was Rector. He then studied divinity at the University of Aberdeen. He had intended to become a minister of the Church of Scotland, but discovered a talent for languages while at Aberdeen and decided on an academic career. Therefore, he entered the University of Edinburgh to study Semitic Languages and graduated with the Scottish first degree of Master of Arts. He then moved to England and undertook post-graduate studies at St John's College, Oxford. His thesis was a study of the Syriac translation of the Book of Ecclesiasticus entitled A preparation for an edition of a critical text of the Syriac version of Ecclesiasticus. He graduated as a Doctor of Philosophy (DPhil) in 1943.

== Academic career ==
McHardy began his academic career while still a doctoral student. In 1942, he was appointed a research fellow in Syriac at the University of Birmingham and curator of its Mingana Collection. In 1945, he joined the University of Oxford as a lecturer in Aramaic and Syriac. In 1947, he was ordained as a Minister of the Church of Scotland. He moved to the University of London in 1948 and was appointed Samuel Davidson Professor of Old Testament Studies. Only in his mid-thirties, he was unusually young to be a professor.

In 1960, he was appointed Regius Professor of Hebrew at the University of Oxford. This required a change in university statutes to open up the chair to those who were not Anglican clergymen. He officially took up the appointment on 1 October 1960. In 1978, he stepped down from the Regius Professorship and retired from academia.

McHardy was involved in the production to two editions of The Bible: the first was the New English Bible (NEB) and the second was its successor, the Revised English Bible (REB). In the mid-1940s, he was selected to be one of the academics translating the Old Testament for the NEB. From 1961, he headed the group of scholars responsible for translating the Apocrypha. The NEB was published in 1970. The translation met with mixed reviews and it was only three years later when work on a revised edition began. In 1973, he was appointed Director of the REB project. After guiding its translation for 15 years, the REB was published in 1989.

== Personal life ==
In 1941, McHardy married Vera Kemp. Together, they had one daughter, Alison, who became a medieval historian, completed an Oxford doctorate, and taught at the university of Nottingham. His wife predeceased him, dying in 1984.

As a child, McHardy contracted polio. He was left disabled and used crutches or a wheelchair to move around.

== Honours ==
In March 1958, McHardy was awarded an honorary Doctor of Divinity (DD) degree by the University of Aberdeen. In the 1990 New Year Honours, he was appointed a Commander of the Order of the British Empire (CBE) for his role as Director of the Revised English Bible project.

== Selected works ==
- Thomas, D. Winton; McHardy, W. D., eds. (1963). Hebrew and Semitic Studies: Essays Presented to G. R. Driver. Oxford: Oxford University Press. ISBN 978-0198154273.

Academic offices
Preceded by Cuthbert Simpson	Regius Professor of Hebrew; University of Oxford; 1960 to 1978	Succeeded by James Barr
