= Cuthbert Simpson =

British clergyman (1892–1969)

Cuthbert Aikman Simpson (24 May 1892 – 30 June 1969) was an Anglican priest and academic. From 1954 to 1959, he was Regius Professor of Hebrew at the University of Oxford. From 1959 to 1969, he was Dean of Christ Church, Oxford.

Born in Charlottetown, Prince Edward Island, Canada, on 24 May 1892, he was educated at the University of King's College in Nova Scotia and Christ Church, Oxford. He was ordained in 1921, his first post was a curacy at St Alban's Woodside, Nova Scotia. He was a Fellow and Tutor at the General Theological Seminary in New York City. In 1954 he became a Canon of Christ Church, Oxford, and Regius Professor of Hebrew in the University of Oxford. Five years later he became Dean of Christ Church, a post he held until 1969. In 1960 Simpson served as president to the Society for Old Testament Study. He died on 30 June 1969.

Simpson was the author of works including:

- Revelation and Response in the Old Testament (1947)
- Jeremiah, The Prophet of 'My People' (1947)
- The Early Traditions of Israel (1948)
- The Composition of the Book of Judges (1958)

Academic offices
Preceded by Herbert Danby	Regius Professor of Hebrew; University of Oxford; 1954 to 1959	Succeeded by William McHardy
Church of England titles
Preceded by John Lowe	Dean of Christ Church, Oxford; 1959 to 1969	Succeeded by Henry Chadwick
