= 1949 Israeli presidential election =

- 16 February 1949

120 members of the Knesset Simple majority of votes needed to win
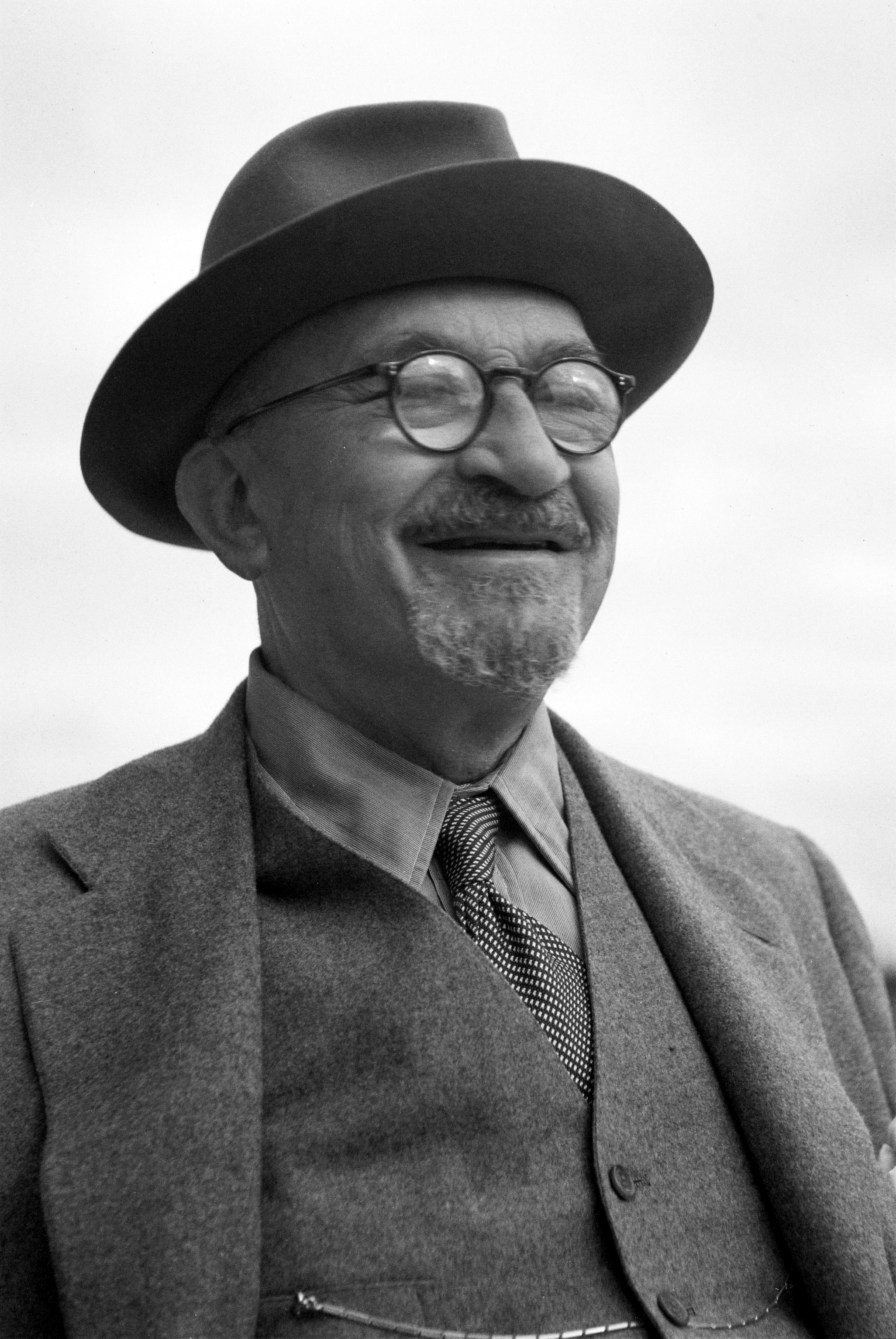

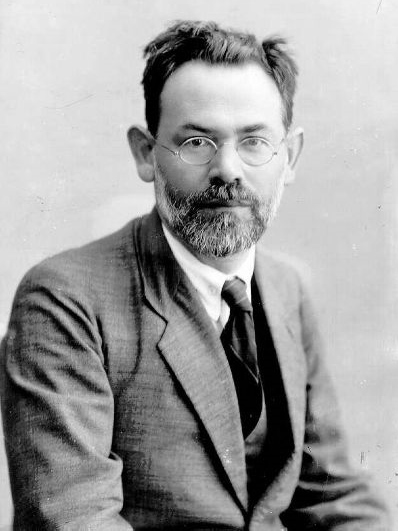
Nominee	Chaim Weizmann	Joseph Klausner
Party	General Zionists	Independent
Electoral vote	83	15
Elected President
Chaim Weizmann

Indirect presidential elections were held in Israel on 16 February 1949 to elect the first president of the State of Israel. The president was elected by the 120 members of the Knesset and would replace the president of the Provisional State Council as head of state.

== Candidates ==
There were two candidates:

- Chaim Weizmann: The president of the Provisional State Council and the incumbent head of state, Weizmann was a leader of the Zionist cause and heavily involved in the Balfour Declaration and the Faisal-Weizmann Agreement regarding the formation of a Jewish homeland in Palestine.
- Joseph Klausner: A Jewish scholar and teacher of Hebrew literature at the Hebrew University of Jerusalem.

== Results ==
The election was settled in the first round, with Weizmann gaining an absolute majority. 114 of the 120 members of the first Knesset voted. Weizmann was declared president on 17 February 1949.

Candidate	Votes	%
Chaim Weizmann	83	84.69
Joseph Klausner	15	15.31
Total	98	100.00
Valid votes	98	85.96
Invalid votes	1	0.88
Blank votes	15	13.16
Total votes	114	100.00
Registered voters/turnout	120	95.00
