= John Morris (Hebraist) =

British Hebraist (1595–1648)

John Morris (1595–1648) was an academic, Hebraist and the Regius Professor of Hebrew at the University of Oxford from 1626.

Born in Dorset, Morris took his B.A. at Christ Church, Oxford in 1613, gaining his M.A. in 1615, a B.D. in 1626 before being awarded a D.D. in 1634. He was chaplain of All Souls College in Oxford, Canon of Christ Church, Oxford from 1634 to 1648, and Regius Professor of Hebrew at Oxford in 1626. Morris was Rector of Sarsden in Oxfordshire 1628, and vicar of St Mary's Church in Pyrton in Oxfordshire 1635.

In his will Morris left investments sufficient to allow for £5 to be paid annually in perpetuity to All Souls College and to Christ Church, Oxford with instructions that oriental books should be purchased for their respective libraries, stating that if either establishment failed to spend the money in time it was to be given to the other. Morris’s own collection of books are located in numerous libraries, including the British Library, Lambeth Palace Library and the Bodleian Library. The exact size of his library and how it came to be dispersed after his death is not known. His will contained no specific mention of his books, while all his personal estate was endowed to his wife Mary with smaller bequests to his sisters, nephews, nieces and goddaughter.

In 1635 he married Mary née Dayrell (1614-1681) at Sunningwell, which at that time was in Berkshire. With her he had three sons: John Morris (1635-1682); Guy Morris (1635-), and Richard Morris (1640-).

After his death he was mentioned in a letter of 1648 written by John Donne the Younger, who was petitioning for Morris's place as Canon of Christ Church, Oxford.
