= Stephen Eaton (priest) =

Stephen Eaton (1737–1806), FRS was Archdeacon of Middlesex from 1781 until his death.

Eaton was born in Deene; educated at Eton and Merton College, Oxford; and ordained deacon in 1761, and priest in 1763. After a curacy in Holborn he served incumbencies in Thorley, Northolt and Soho.

He died on 14 February 1806.

== Notes ==
Church of England titles
Preceded by George Jubb	Archdeacon of Middlesex; 1781–1806	Succeeded by George Owen Cambridge
