= Herbert Danby =

Anglican priest and Oxford University professor (1889–1953)

- Born: 20 January 1889
- Died: 29 March 1953
- Occupation: Theologian
- Children: John Michael Anthony Danby
- Awards: Kennicott Scholarship

Herbert Danby (20 January 1889 – 29 March 1953) was an Anglican priest and writer who played a central role in the change of attitudes toward Judaism in the first half of the twentieth century.

== Education ==
Danby was educated at Church Middle Class School, Leeds and Keble College, Oxford. He was a Holroyd Musical Scholar, and became a Fellow of the Royal College of Organists in 1907. He retained a lifelong passionate interest in music, and also in golf.

Danby had a distinguished career at Oxford, winning the Junior Septuagint Prize, the Pusey and Ellerton Scholarship, the Houghton Syriac Prize and a Senior Kennicott Scholarship. He achieved a first class degree in Oriental Languages, and was awarded an MA in 1914. His studies continued after he started work, and he was made a Doctor of Divinity in 1923, partly for his translation Tractate Sanhedrin, Mishna and Tosefta, published in 1919.

== Early career ==
Danby became a Deacon in 1913, and worked as Curate of the Parish of Waddesdon, Buckinghamshire. Ordained as a priest in 1914, he became Subwarden of St Deiniol's Library, Hawarden, Flintshire, 1914-9.

== Jerusalem ==
In 1919, Danby moved to Jerusalem to become Librarian of St. George's Cathedral. He was Residentiary Canon there, 1921–36. From 1923, he was Dean of the Palestine Board of Higher Studies and The Times Correspondent for Palestine and Transjordan. From 1928, he was Examining Chaplain to the Bishop of Jerusalem.

He was editor of the Journal of the Palestine Oriental Society from 1920, and President of that Society in 1934. He engaged in the study of Jewish literature, and published his English translation of the Mishnah in 1933, the first ever complete translation of the Mishnah into English. He also translated a remarkable work by Joseph Klausner entitled Jesus of Nazareth.

== Oxford ==
In 1936, he returned to Oxford as Regius Professor of Hebrew and Canon of Christ Church. He was Grinfield Lecturer on the Septuagint, 1939–43, Examining Chaplain to the Bishop of Monmouth, 1939–41 and Treasurer of Christ Church Cathedral from 1943.

He assisted in the Yale Translation of the Mishneh Torah of Maimonides.

His contributions to the decline of antisemitism in intellectual circles in the twentieth century was very significant. He was at work revising his translation of Maimonides' Book of Cleanness when he finally succumbed to his fatal illness. Among his close friends were Professor Godfrey Rolles Driver of Oxford University and Rabbi Dr. Isidore Epstein of Jews' College, London.

== Publications ==
- The Jew and Christianity, 1927
- English and Modern Hebrew Dictionary, 1939

=== Translations from the Hebrew ===
- Joseph Klausner's Jesus of Nazareth, 1925
- Joseph Klausner's "History of Modern Hebrew Literature", 1932
- The Sixty-three Tractates of the Mishnah, translated with Introduction, etc., published in December, 1933 (ISBN 0-19-815402-X)
- H. N. Bialik's, And it Came to Pass, Biblical Legends, 1938.
- The Book of Offerings, Moses Maimonides, Julian Obermann, in December 1950; ISBN 0-300-00398-6
- The Book of Cleanness, Moses Maimonides, Julian Obermann, was published in December 1954, ISBN 0-300-00397-8
