= Dura Parchment 24 =

Uncial 0212
- New Testament manuscript
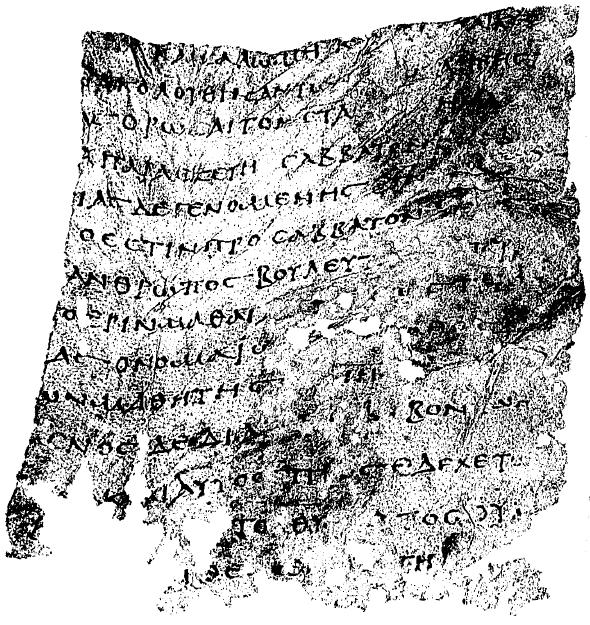
- Dura p. 24 in facsimile edition (Kraeling 1935)
- Name: Dura Parchment 24
- Text: Diatessaron
- Date: c. 200-300
- Script: Greek
- Found: Dura, 1933
- Now at: Beinecke Rare Book & Manuscript Library, Yale University
- Cite: C. H. Kraeling, A Greek Fragment of Tatians's Diatessaron from Dura, S & D III (1935)
- Size: [10.5] x [9.5] cm
- Type: mixed
- Category: III
- Note: unique reading in Luke 23:49

Dura Parchment 24, designated as Uncial 0212 (in the Gregory-Aland numbering), is a Greek uncial manuscript of the New Testament. The manuscript has been assigned to the 3rd century, palaeographically, though an earlier date cannot be excluded. It contains some unusual orthographic features, which have been found nowhere else.

It is possibly the only surviving manuscript of the Greek Diatessaron, unless Papyrus 25 is also a witness to that work. The text of the fragment was reconstructed by Kraeling and Welles. Dura Parchment 24 (P. Dura 24) is currently housed at the Beinecke Rare Book & Manuscript Library at Yale University in New Haven catalogued there as Dura Parch. 10.

== History of the manuscript ==
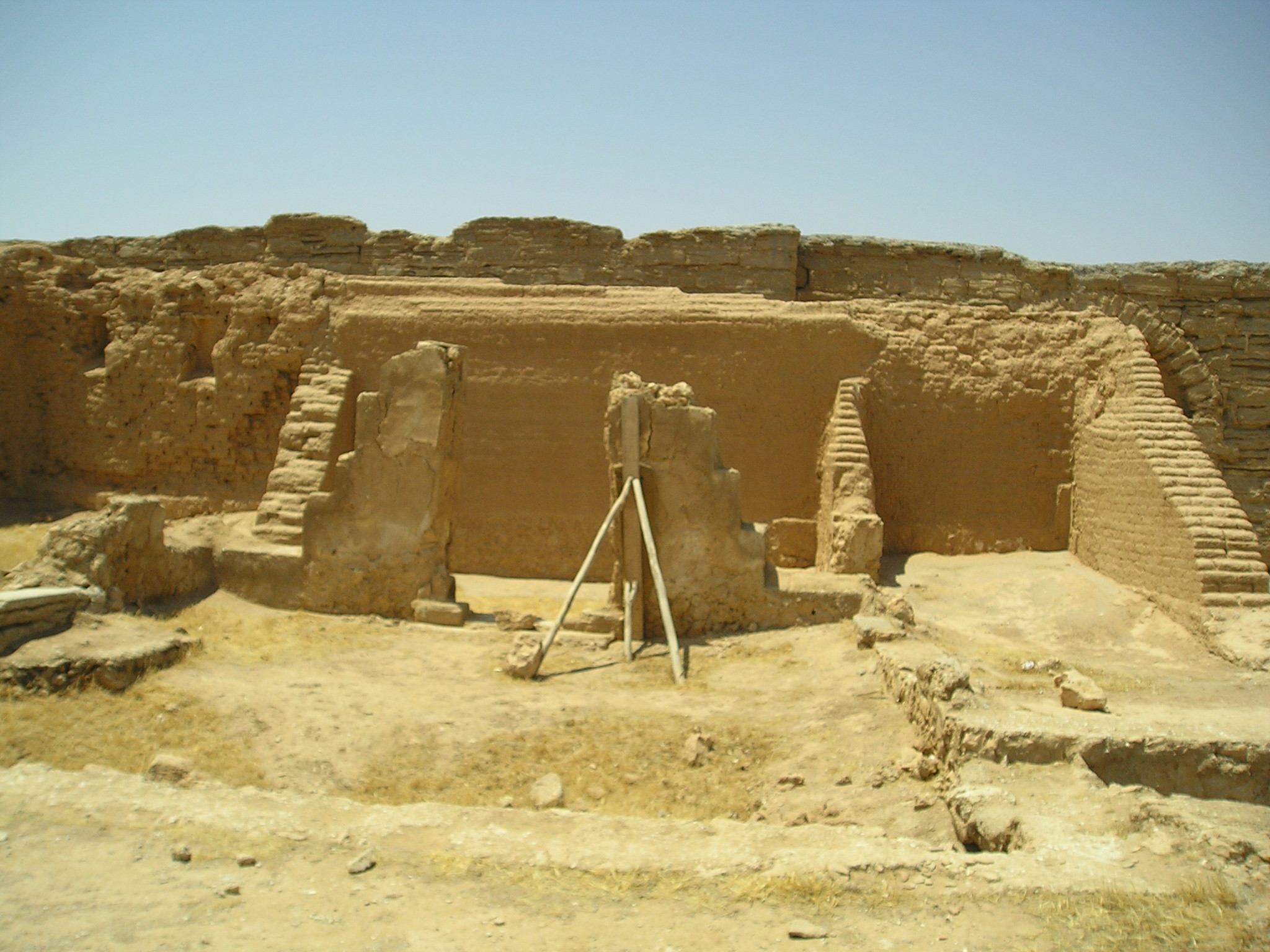
Dura-Europos church in Dura Europolis

On March 5, 1933, during the excavations conducted by Clark Hopkins amongst the ruins of a Roman border-town, Dura-Europos, on the lower Euphrates, under the embankment which filled in the street inside the wall and also covered the Christian church and the Jewish synagogue, the parchment fragment now known as Dura Parchment 24 was found. Susan M. Hopkins was the first to recognize it as a portion of the Gospel.

The fragment was examined by Carl H. Kraeling, who published its text in 1935, with an extensive discussion. Kraeling concluded that the fragment was a copy of Tatian's Diatessaron. It was re-edited, with a minor corrections, by C. Bradford Welles in 1959. In 1999, David Parker, Mark Goodacre, and David Taylor published a third attempt at reconstructing the text.

There is a dispute over the identity of the manuscript. Daniel Plooij agreed with Hopkins that "[t]here is no reasonable doubt that the fragment is really Tatian". Parker, Taylor, and Goodacre, however, argued against identifying the fragment with Tatian's Diatessaron. Jan Joosten defended Hopkin's identification of the manuscript with the Diatessaron, arguing from a partial agreement in sequence between the elements in the Dura Fragment and witnesses to Tatian's harmony. Ian N. Mills criticized Joosten's method for identifying witnesses to the Diatessaron and showed that the Dura Fragment contradicted Ephrem's Commentary on the Diatessaron.

Mina Monier and Joan E. Taylor conclude the Dura 24 fragment is a genuine attempt at copying Tatian's Diatessaron, though not a perfect copy of any master text.

The manuscript was added to the list of the New Testament manuscripts by Kurt Aland in 1953.

== Description ==
It is not, strictly speaking, a manuscript of the New Testament — it contains only phrases from the text of the Gospels. On a single parchment leaf (10.5 cm by 9.5 cm), the following texts were copied: Matthew 27:56–57; Mark 15:40,42; Luke 23:49,50,51; John 19:38. Generally, it has been regarded as a fragment of Tatian's Diatessaron (Gospel harmony). Only one side of the leaf has been used, and may well have come from a scroll. The text was written one column per page, 15 (or more) lines per page, 30–35 letters per line, in uncial letters.

Parts of the leaf have decayed, resulting in some loss from the text — approximately the first five to seven letters of each line. Additionally, some other letters are not legible. Classic nomina sacra abbreviations were employed by the scribe, with the typical linear superscript. The text is written in a good book-hand. There are three kinds of alpha: the older capital, the uncial, and the 3rd-century-cursive–type. The letters tau and eta (in the word της — 'the') have unusual characters, and were written with ligatures. The letter mu is characterized by a deep saddle.

The text of the manuscript has some unusual orthographic features, which have been found nowhere else. For example, the letter upsilon (Υ) appears at several points in the text, but not connected with it in any way that has yet been understood. (See text transcription below, with lower case upsilon — υ.)

== Text ==
=== Textual character of 0212 ===
In Luke 23:49 it contains a unique reading: "the wives of those who had been his disciples". In Matthew 27:57, the city Arimathea, normally spelled Αριμαθαια, is spelled Ερινμαθαια (Erinmathea).

The text twice agrees with Codex Vaticanus and Bohairic against everything else (in line 1. added αι before γυναικης; in line 9. και between αγαθος and δικαιος is omitted).

There are two agreements with Codex Bezae, in line 4 it has ην δε η ημερα παρασκευη for και ημερα ην παρασκευη [or παρασκευς], in line 9 και ανηρ is omitted.

The fragment has two agreements with Syriac Sinaitic. First Syriac Sinaitic shares with Codex Bezae the reading ην δε η ημερα for και ημερα ην, and secondly it describes Arimathaea as "city of Judea" instead of "city of the Jews". The last reading is supported by other Syriac authorities, by Old-Latin Codex Veronensis, Vulgate, and the Arabic Harmony, against the entire Greek tradition. The fragment does not agree with the Syriac reading Ramtha for Arimethaea.

The text-type of this manuscript is no longer classifiable, because of the Diatessaric character of text (likewise Papyrus 25). Even so, Aland placed it in Category III.

=== Kraeling's reconstruction ===
Greek Text	Translation	References
Ζεβεδαίου / καὶ Σαλώμη / καὶ γυναικες	... Zebedee and Salome and the wives	Matt. 27:56 / Mark 15:40 / Luke 23:49b-c
αἱ συνακολουθοῦσαι αὐτῷ ἀπὸ τῆς	of those who had followed him from	
Γαλιλαίας ὁρῶσαι ταῦτα / καὶ	Galilee to see the crucified. And	Luke 23:54
ἡμέρα ἦν παρασκευῆς καὶ σάββατον ἐπέΦω-	the day was Preparation: the Sabbath was daw-	
σκεν / ὀψίας δὲ γενομένης / ἐπεὶ ἠν παρασ-	ning. And when it was evening, on the Prep-	Matt. 27:57 Mark 15:42
κευή, ὅ ἐστι προσάββατον /	aration, that is, the day before the Sabbath,	
ἦλθεν ἄνθρωπος πλούσιος / βουλευτὴς ὑπάρχων	there came up a man, [be]ing a member of the council,	Matt. 27:57 / Luke 23:50
ἀπὸ Ἀριμαθαίας / πόλεως τῶν	from Arimathea, a city of	[Matt. 27:57] / Luke 23:51
Ἰουδαίων / τοὔνομα ἸωσὴΦ / ἀνὴρ ἄγαθος καὶ δί-	Judea, by name Joseph, good and ri-	Matt. 27:57 / Luke 23:50a / Luke 23:50c
καιος / ὣν μαθητὴς τοῦ Ἰησοῦ κε-	ghteous man, being a disciple of Jesus, but	John 19:38
κρυμμένος δὲ διὰ τὸν φόβον τῶν	secretly, for fear of the	
Ἰουδαίων / καὶ αὐτὸς / προσεδέχετο	Jews. And he was looking for	Matt. 27:57 / Luke 23:51b
τὴν βασιλείαν τοῦ θεοῦ, / οὗτος ούκ	the kingdom of God. This man had not	Luke 23:51a
ἦν συνκατατεθειμένος τῇ βουλῇ	consented to their purpose...	

The Greek text and references follow Kraeling, the translation is according to C. Badford Welles.

=== Welles' reconstruction ===
Greek Text	Translation	References
	...[the mother of the sons of	
[Ζεβεδ]αι̣ο̣υ και Σαλωμη κ[α]ι̣ α̣ι γ̣υ̣ν̣αικες	Zebed]ee and Salome and the wives	Matt. 27:56 / Mark 15:40 / Luke 23:49b-c
[των συ]ν̣ακολουθησανων α̣[υτ]ω υ απο της	[of those who] had followed him from	
[Γαλιλαι]α̣ς ορωσαι τον στ[αυρωθεντ]α. υυυ ην δε	[Galile]e to see the crucified. And	Luke 23:54
[η ημερ]α Παρασκευη. υ Σαββατον επεφω-	[the da]y was Preparation: the Sabbath was daw-	
[σκεν. ο]ψ̣ιας δε γενομενης επι τ̣[η Π]α̣ρ[α]σ-	[ning]. And when it was evening, on the Prep-	Matt. 27:57 Mark 15:42
[κευη], υ ο εστιν Προσαββατον, πρ̣ο̣σ-	[aration], that is, the day before the Sabbath,	
[ηλθην] ανθρωπος βουλευτη̣[ς υ]π̣α̣ρ-	[there came] up a man, [be]ing a member of the council,	Matt. 27:57 / Luke 23:50
[χων α]π̣ο Ερινμαθαια[ς] π[ο]λ̣ε̣ω̣ς της	from Arimathea, a c[i]ty of	[Matt. 27:57] / Luke 23:51
[Ιουδαι]ας, ονομα Ιω[σεφ], α[γ]αθος̣ δι-	[Jude]a, by name Jo[seph], g[o]od and ri-	Matt. 27:57 / Luke 23:50a / Luke 23:50c
[καιος], ων μαθητης τ[ο]υ̣ Ιη(σου), κ̣ε- υυυυ	[ghteous], being a disciple of Jesus, but	John 19:38
[κρυμ]μενος δε δια τ̣ο̣ν̣ φ̣ο̣βον των	se[cret]ly, for fear of the	
[Ιουδαιω]ν, και αυτος προσεδεχτο	[Jew]s. And he was looking for	Matt. 27:57 / Luke 23:51b
[την] υ β̣[ασιλειαν] του̣ Θ(εο)υ ο̣υτος ουκ	[the] k[ingdom] of God. This man [had] not	Luke 23:51a
[ην συνκατατ] ιθεμ̣εν̣[ο]ς̣ τη β̣[ουλη]	[con]sented to [their] p[urpose]...	

Both the reconstruction of the text and the translation follow C. Badford Welles.

== Significance of the manuscript ==
The surviving leaf of the scroll or codex described here, was found in 1933, during excavations among the ruins of Dura-Europos, known to have been destroyed by Shapur I King of Persia in 256. This means the manuscript must have been written before 256 (known as a terminus ad quem). The time between Tatian's original composition and the production of this copy could not have been longer than 80 years (though it could have been shorter).

Before this find, the only copies of the Diatessaron known to modern scholarship were translations into languages other than Greek—notably Latin, Arabic, and Armenian. This fragment is potentially much more direct evidence that Tatian composed his Diatessaron with great diligence. "Probably he worked from four separate manuscripts, one for each of the Gospels, and, as he brought together phrases, now from this Gospel and now that, he would no doubt cross out those phrases in the manuscripts from which he was copying."

The fragment does not help in the discussion of a Greek or Syriac origin of the Diatessaron. Burkitt pointed two differences between its text of Luke 23:51 and the Old Syriac manuscripts of the Gospels (the kingdom of Heaven ] the kingdom of God), in agreement with the accepted Greek text. Baumstark, on the other hand, identified several presumed Syriasms in the diction, as well as the unusual spelling of Arimathea, Ερινμαθαια, in terms of Syriac origin.

== See also ==
- List of New Testament uncials
- Diatessaron
- Textual criticism
