= John Bearblock =

John Bearblock was born near Rochester about 1532, and was educated at Oxford. He is said to have become a fellow of St. John's College in 1558 and of Exeter College on 30 June 1566. He graduated B.A. 29 March 1561, and M.A. 13 February 1564–5. Before the close of 1566 he was dean of his college, and was elected senior proctor of the university on 20 April 1579, his colleague being Thomas Bodley. In 1570 he was granted four years' leave of absence, probably for study abroad, and in 1572 received the degree of BCL. from a continental university. Nothing further is ascertainable about his personal history.

== Works ==
In September 1566, on the visit of Queen Elizabeth to Oxford, Bearblock prepared small drawings of all the colleges, the earliest of their kind, for each of which his friend Thomas Neal, Hebrew reader in the university, wrote descriptive verses in Latin. The views, which were greatly admired, were displayed on the walls of St. Mary's Church for several days, and there examined by the queen. A carefully executed copy of them, which is still extant, was subsequently presented to the Bodleian Library by John More in 1630; but the original sketches, having been given to St. John's College, were granted in 1616 to Sir Thomas Lake, and apparently lost. Bearblock's drawings, with Neal"s verses, were engraved in 1713, at the end of Hearne's edition of Dodwell's De Parma Equestri Woodwardiana Dissertatio. In 1728 they were again engraved in the margin of a reproduction of Ralph Aggas"s map of Oxford, first engraved in 1578, and in 1882 they were for the third time reproduced, with Neal's verses, in a volume privately printed at Oxford. Bearblock wrote an elaborate account of the queen's visit to Oxford in 1566 under the title of Commentarii sive Ephemeræ Actiones rerum illustrium Oxonii gestarum in adventu serenissimae principis Elizabethæ. The pamphlet was dedicated to Lord Cobham and to Sir William Petre, a munificent benefactor of Exeter College, but it was not printed until 1729, when Hearne published it in an appendix (pages 251-96) to his edition of the Historia et Vita Ricardi II. Bearblock refers to the exhibition of his drawings on page 283. A map of Rochester by Bearblock, of which nothing is now known, was extant in the time of Anthony à Wood. Tanner erroneously gives Bearblock"s name as Beartlock.
