= Joseph Klausner =

Jewish historian

- יוסף קלוזנר
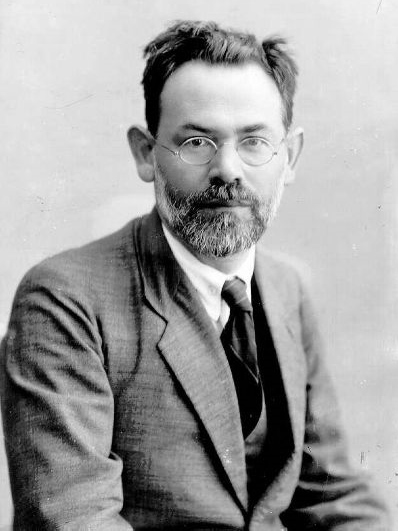
- Joseph Klausner
- Born: Joseph Gedaliah Klausner; 20 August 1874; Olkeniki, Vilna Governorate, Russian Empire
- Died: 27 October 1958 (aged 84); Jerusalem, Israel
- Occupations: historian and professor of Hebrew Literature
- Known for: redactor of the Encyclopedia Hebraica
- Title: professor of Hebrew literature at the Hebrew University of Jerusalem

Academic work
- Institutions: Hebrew University of Jerusalem
- Notable works: Jesus of Nazareth: His Life, Times & Teaching

Joseph Gedaliah Klausner (Hebrew: יוסף גדליה קלוזנר; 20 August 1874 – 27 October 1958) was a Lithuanian-born Israeli historian and professor of Hebrew literature. He was the chief redactor of the Encyclopedia Hebraica. He was a candidate for president in the first Israeli presidential election in 1949, losing to Chaim Weizmann. Klausner was the great-uncle of Israeli author Amos Oz.

== Biography ==
Joseph Klausner was born in Olkeniki, Vilna Governorate, Russian Empire, in 1874. At the turn of the 20th century, the Klausners left Lithuania and settled in Odessa. Klausner was active in the city's scientific, literary and Zionist circles. He was a committed Zionist who knew Theodor Herzl personally and attended the First Zionist Congress.

In 1912, Klausner visited Palestine for the first time, and settled there in 1919. In 1925, he became a professor of Hebrew literature at the Hebrew University of Jerusalem. He specialized in the history of the Second Temple period. Although not an Orthodox Jew, he observed Sabbath and the dietary laws. He had a wide grasp of the Talmud and Midrashic literature.

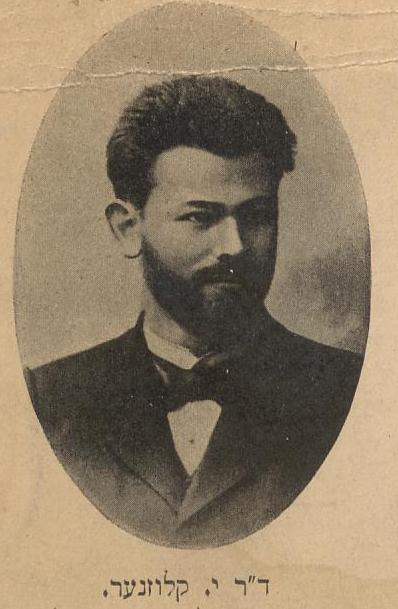
A young Joseph Klausner

Joseph Klausner was a member of the circle of Russian Zionist political activists from Odessa, which included Ze'ev Jabotinsky and Menachem Ussishkin. Although not a 'party man,' he supported Revisionist Zionism. In 1919 he helped organize the Ruslan, a ship carrying Jewish refugees and immigrants to Jaffa from Odessa. In July 1929, Klausner established the Pro-Wailing Wall Committee to defend Jewish rights, and resolve problems over access and arrangements for worship at the Western Wall. His house in Talpiot neighborhood of Jerusalem was destroyed in the 1929 Palestine riots.

Despite his Zionist ideology, Klausner had numerous disagreements with Chaim Weizmann. The two were candidates in the presidential election of 1949; Weizmann was declared the first President of Israel.

== Academic career ==
Klausner earned his PhD in Germany. One of his most influential books was about Jesus. The book Jesus of Nazareth, and its sequel, From Jesus to Paul, gained him fame. In it, Klausner described how Jesus was best understood as a Jew and Israelite who was trying to reform the religion, and died as a devout Jew. Herbert Danby, an Anglican priest, translated the work from Hebrew into English so that English scholars might avail themselves of the information. A number of clergymen, incensed at Danby for translating the book, demanded his recall from Jerusalem. Later in his career, he was given a chair in Jewish history.

Amos Oz described his childhood visits to Klausner's house in Talpiot and his impression of Klausner's erudition in his memoir, A Tale of Love and Darkness.

== Awards and recognition ==
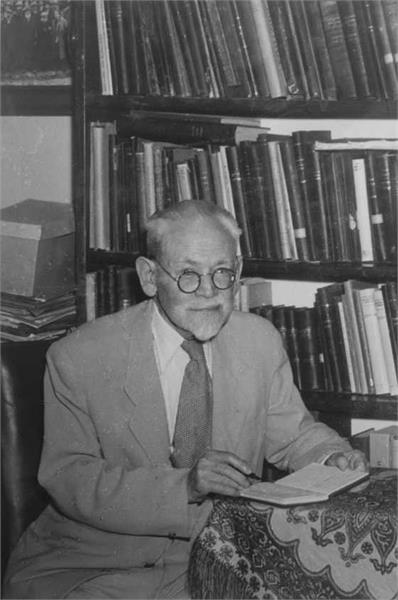
Joseph Klausner 1945

In both 1941 and 1949, Klausner was awarded the Bialik Prize for Jewish thought. In 1958, he was awarded the Israel Prize in Jewish studies. In 1982, in recognition of his scholarly achievements, the State of Israel issued a stamp with his picture on it.

== Published works ==
- Klausner, Joseph (1921). Jesus of Nazareth: His Life, Times & Teaching. Translated by Danby, Herbert. New York: Macmillan.
- Klausner, Joseph (1932). A History of Modern Hebrew Literature (1785-1930). Translated by Danby, Herbert. London: M. L. Cailingold.
- Klausner, Joseph (1942). From Jesus To Paul. Translated by Stinespring, William F. New York: Macmillan.
- Klausner, Joseph (1954). The Messianic Idea in Israel: From Its Beginning to the Completion of the Mishnah. Translated by Stinespring, William F. New York: Macmillan. ISBN 1-4917-7210-7.
- Klausner, Joseph (1989). Jesus of Nazareth: His Life, Times & Teaching. Translated by Danby, Herbert (Reissued ed.). New York: Bloch. ISBN 0819705659.

== See also ==
- List of Israel Prize recipients
- List of Bialik Prize recipients
