= Church of St Mary the Virgin, Harlow =

Church in Essex, England

Church of St Mary, Harlow
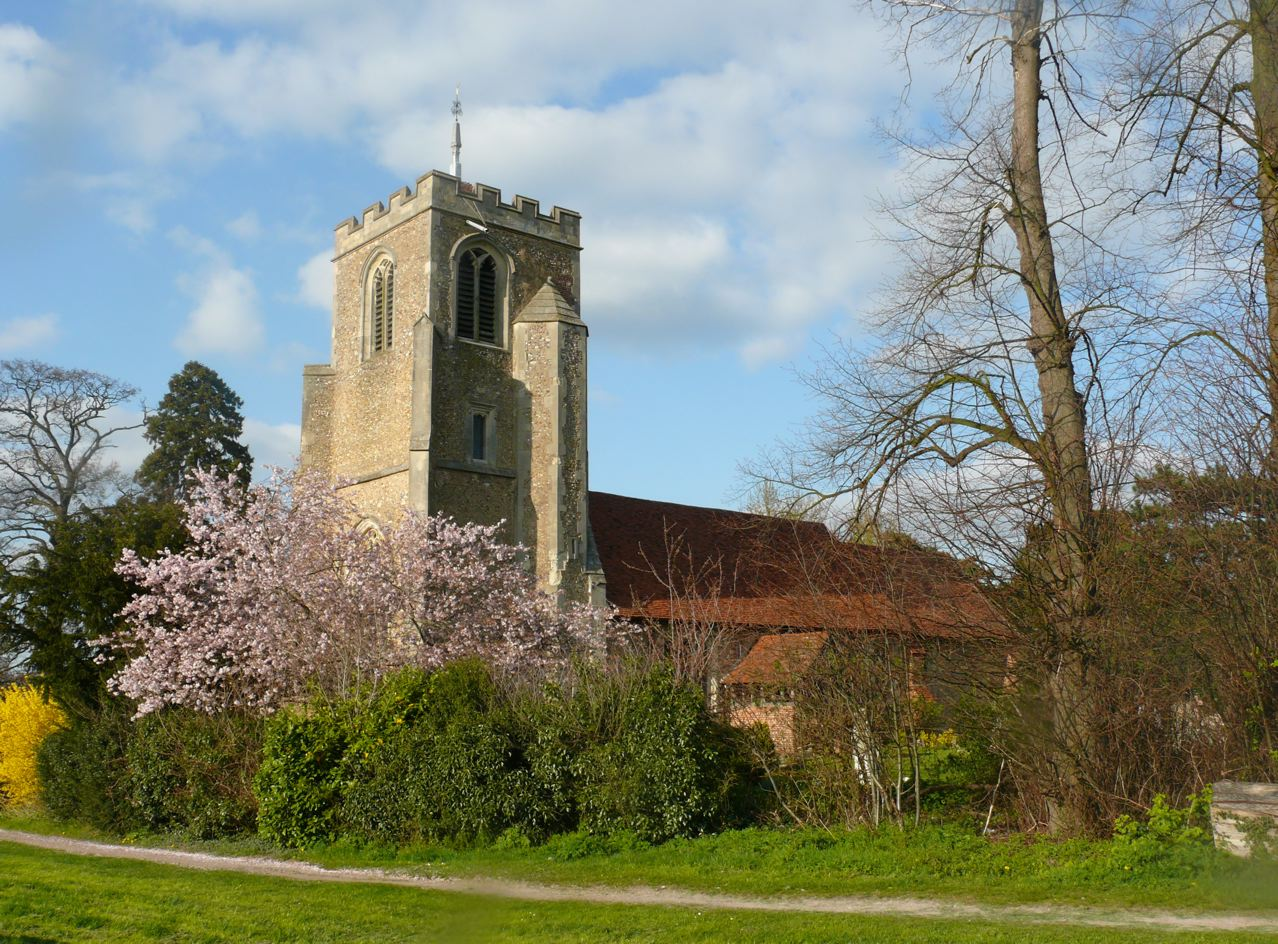
- St Mary-at-Latton Church from 1st Avenue
- Church of St Mary, Harlow
- Denomination: Church of England
- Churchmanship: Liberal Catholic
- Website: St Mary-at-Latton

History
- Dedication: Saint Mary the Virgin

Architecture
- Functional status: Parish church
- Heritage designation: Grade I
- Designated: 9 July 1950
- Architectural type: Church

Administration
- Province: Canterbury
- Diocese: Chelmsford
- Archdeaconry: Harlow
- Deanery: Harlow
- Parish: St Mary-at-Latton

Clergy
- Vicar: Rev'd Lynn Hurry

St Mary the Virgin Church (known locally as St Mary-at-Latton Church) is located in Latton, Harlow, Essex, England. It is an Anglican church (Church of England) and is liberal catholic in tradition. The church building is Grade I listed.

== Description and history ==
St Mary the Virgin Church was the place of worship for the ancient parish of Latton. After Harlow New Town was created in 1947 and population grew, the parish was divided in three, with the northern portion retaining the name of Latton.

The Norman church was built in 1087. There is a Norman window in the south wall, and the Norman door arch is visible above the now disused south door. The west tower had been built by 1234.

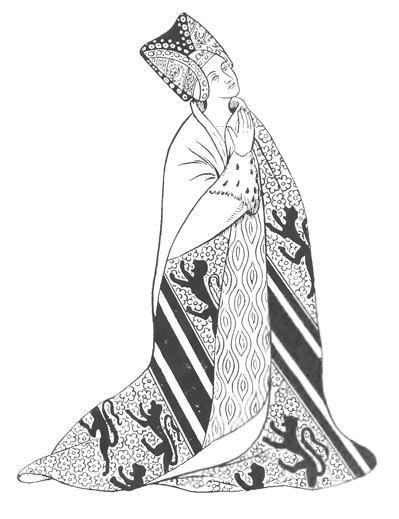
Bohun, Wife of Sir Peter Arderne

The north chapel for Sir Peter Arderne's chantry was completed in 1466. Some fragments of wall decoration are still visible. The altar tomb of Sir Peter Arderne and his wife Bohun is set in an opening between the chapel and chancel and has fine brass effigies.

In 1562 the porch was added by the Altham family, owners of the Mark Hall Estate, and in the late 16th century the tower and the west end of the nave were rebuilt.

About 1800 the outside north wall of the nave was faced with brick and the doorway and windows were closed off and plastered over.

Many changes were made during the 19th century, including the restoration of the interior in 1848 and extensive repairs to the tower in 1873 and to the chancel in 1888.

The church was damaged by a V-1 flying bomb in 1945. This resulted in the loss of stained glass windows on the south side of the church. The church reopened in 1950 after extensive repairs.

In 1964 a fire caused further damage, including the destruction of the rood screen. The fire is thought to have been caused by a workman's cigarette rolling into the organ. Luckily the fire was caught early by a parishioner who was tending to her son's grave, but the church still had to be completely restored in 1965. A vestry was built on the north side of the nave in 1971, and the tower was again restored in 1977.

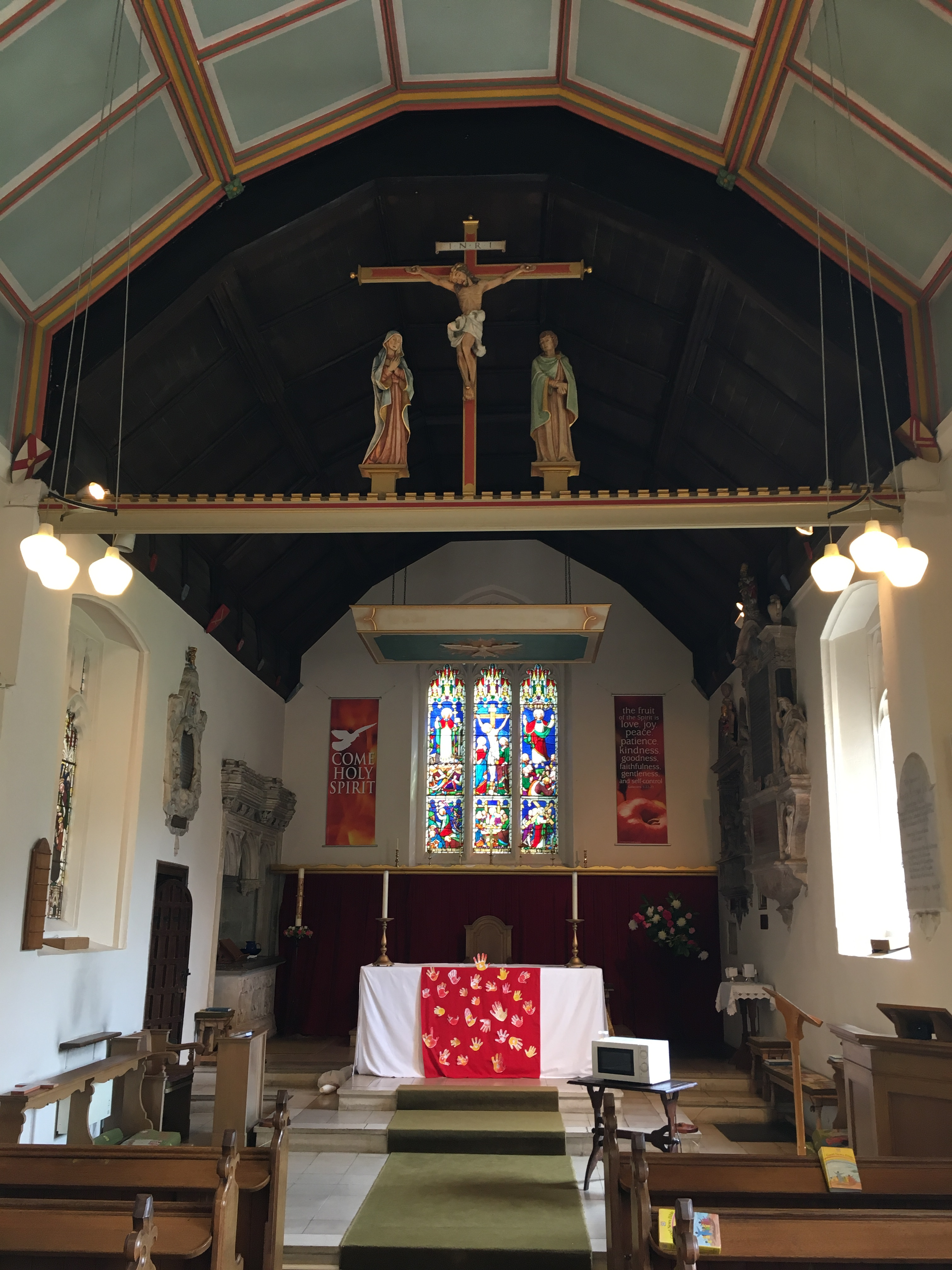
Interior of the church

== Monuments ==
The church contains many monuments erected for members of the families who have owned the nearby Mark Hall Estate, including the altar tomb of Sir Peter Arderne and his wife with brass effigies (1467); a brass probably of Sir Peter's daughter Elizabeth and her husband Richard Harper (1492); and an alabaster monument showing the kneeling figures of James Altham, his wife, and 11 children (1583).

There are also brasses to Frances, wife of Richard Franklin (1604); and Emanuel Wolley (1617) and wife Margaret (1635).

Sir Edward Altham has a marble monument with pilasters, pediment, urns, and angels dating from 1632, and there is a wall tablet in memory of the vicar Thomas Denne, dating from 1680. There are also wall tablets to other Althams and to members of the Lushington, Burgoyne, and Arkwright families.

Monument Gallery

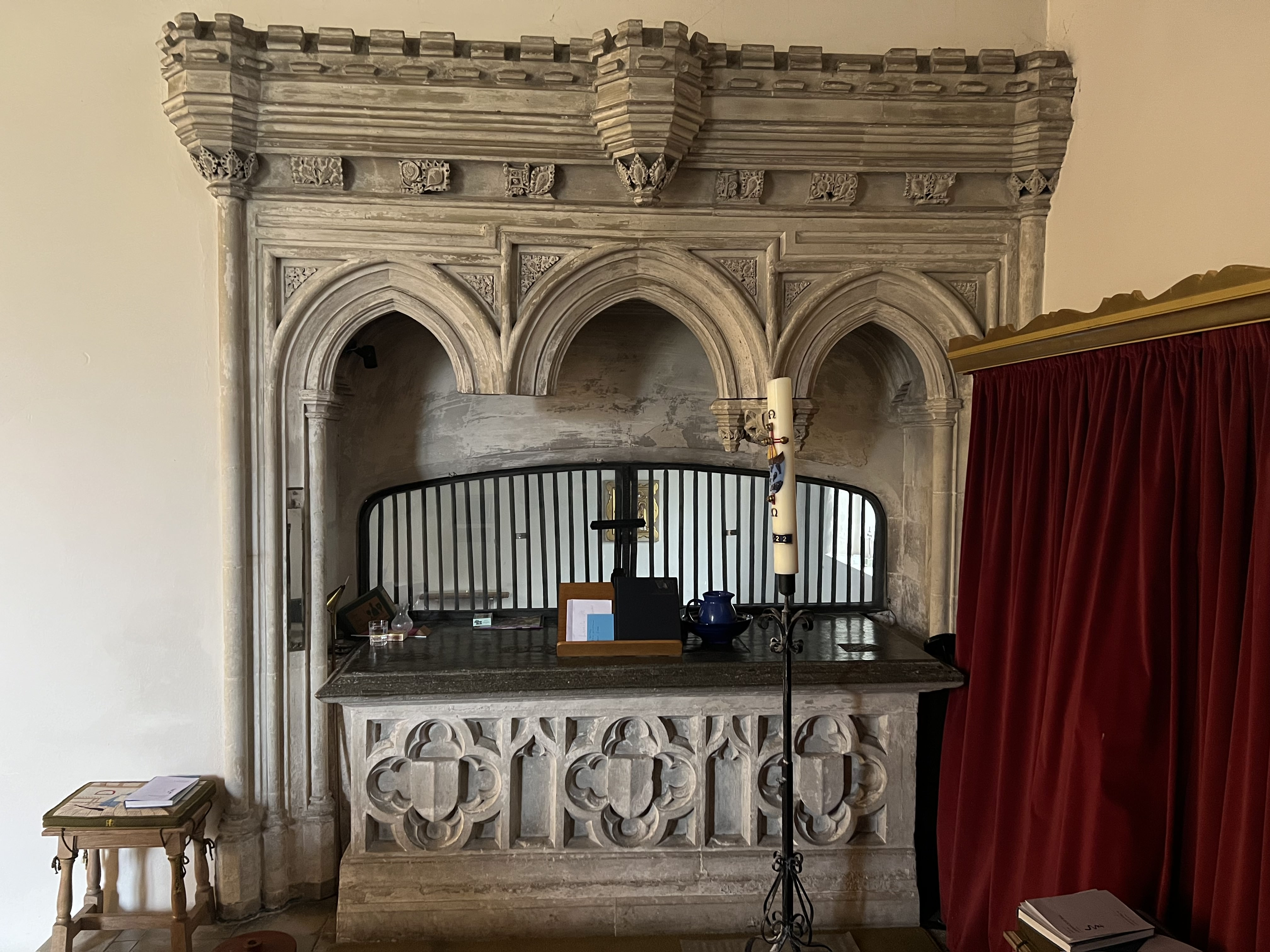
The altar tomb of Sir Peter Arderne and his wife.

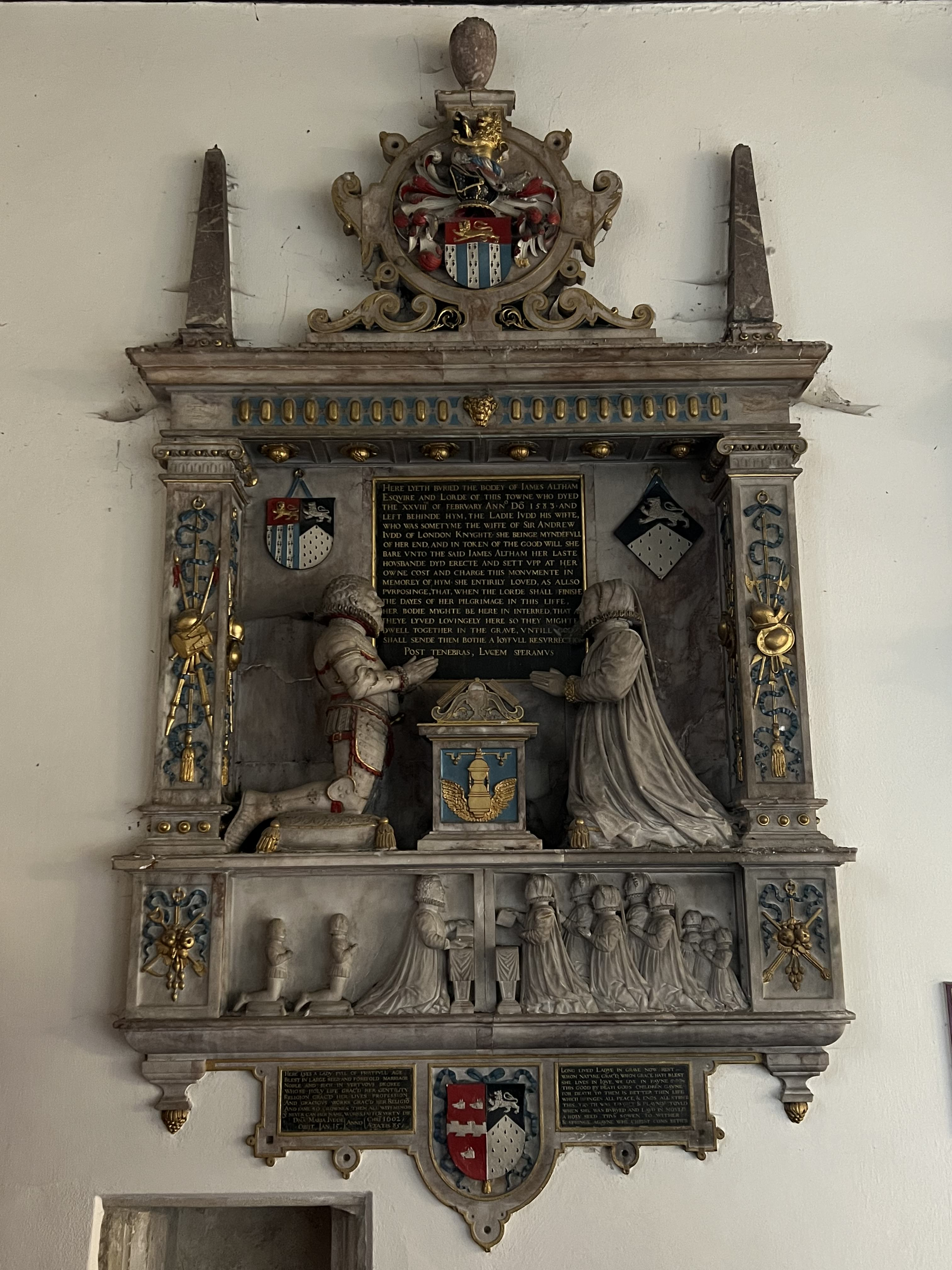
Monument showing the kneeling figures of James Altham, his wife, and their 11 children.

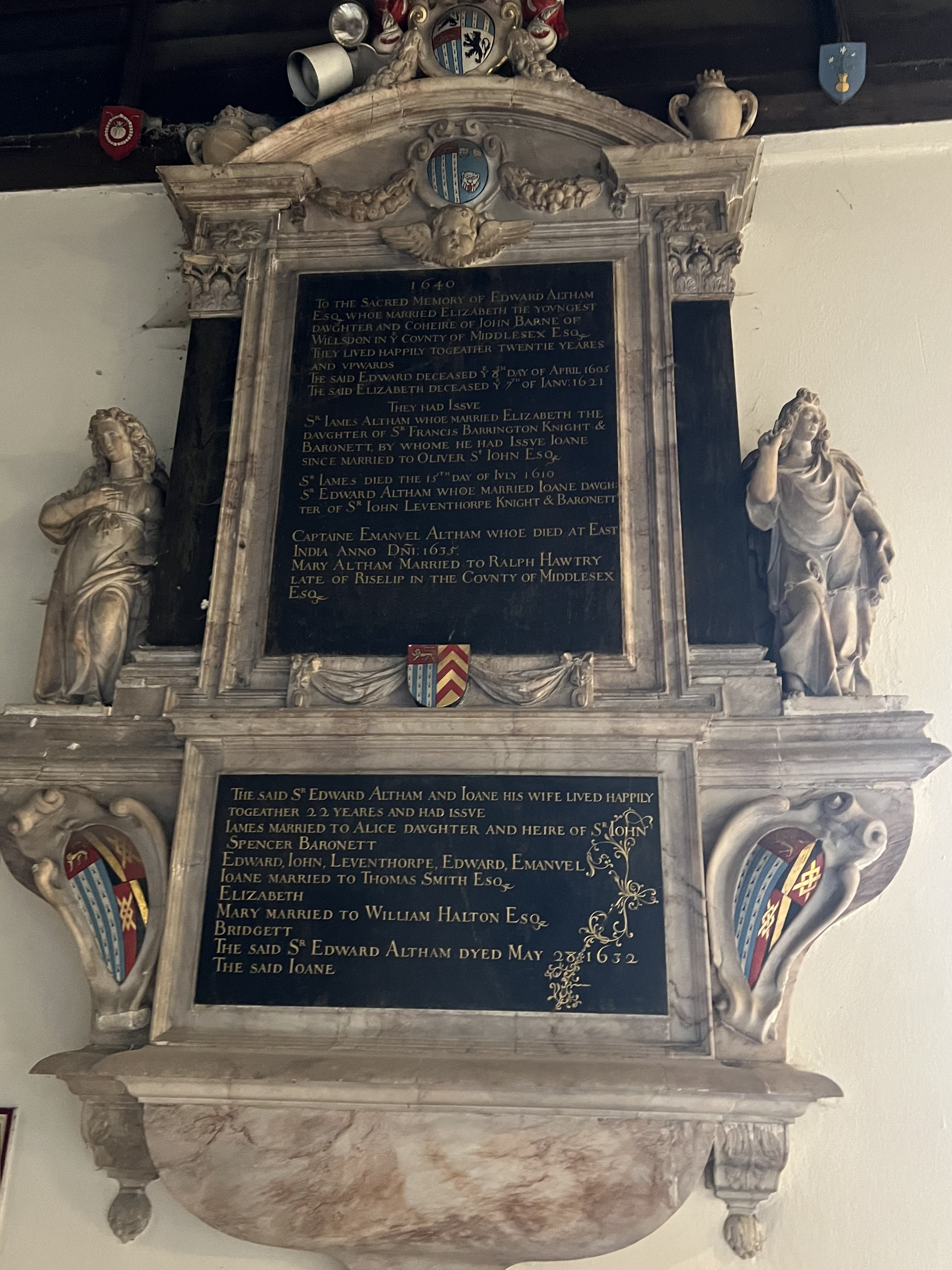
Sir Edward Altham's marble monument with pilasters, pediment, urns, and angels.

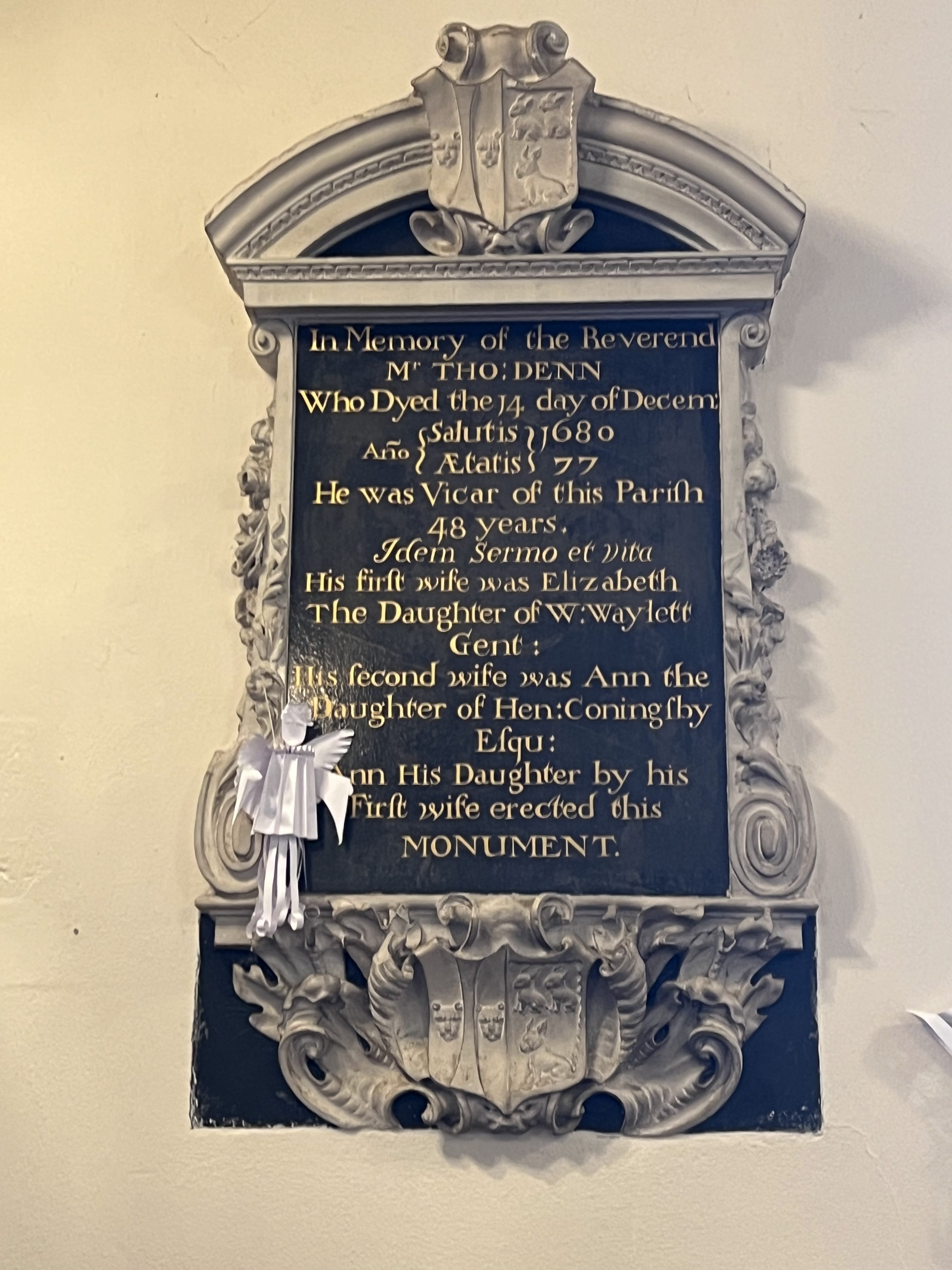
Rev Thomas Denne's Wall tablet.

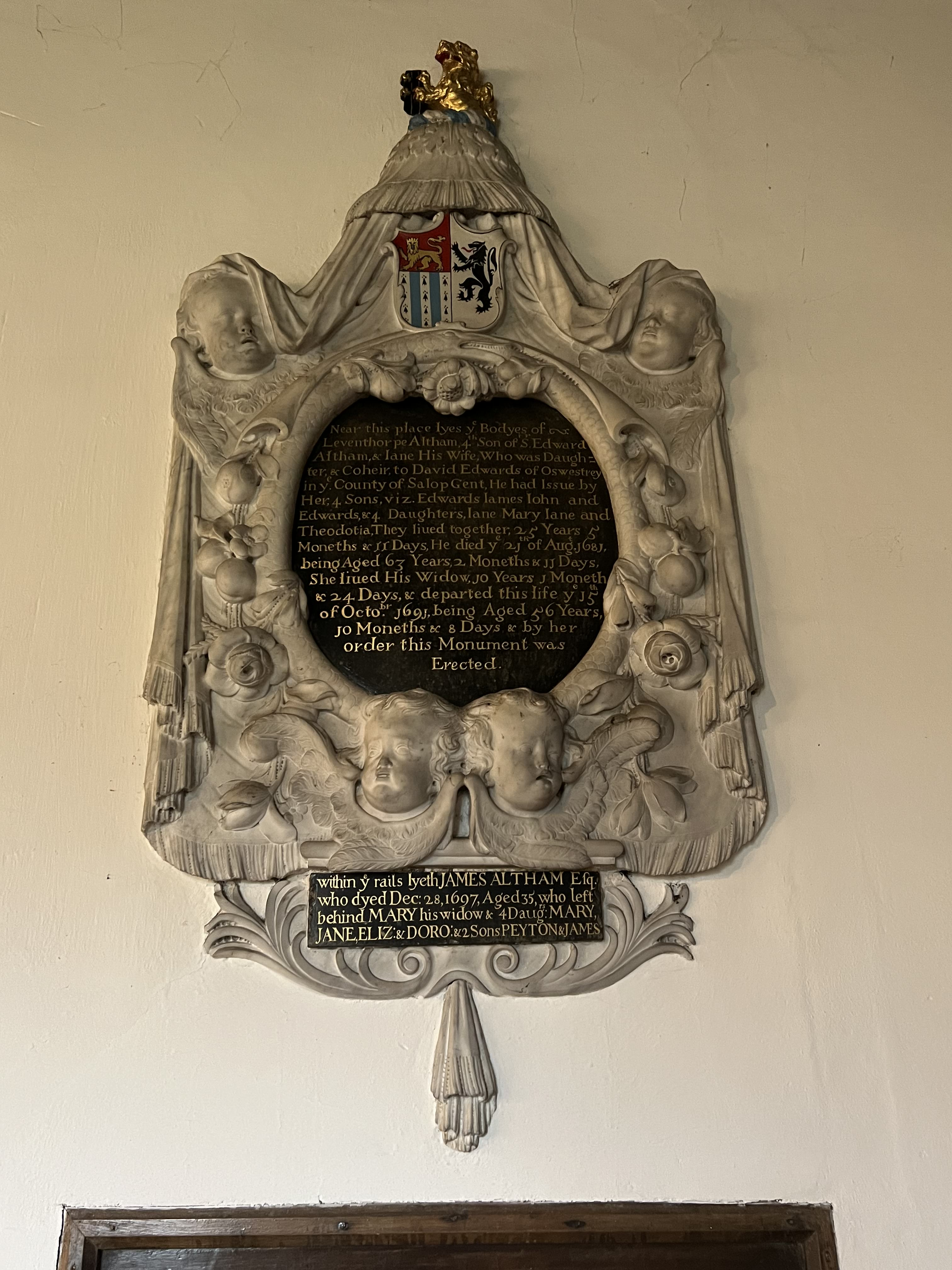
Leventhorpe Altham's Wall tablet.

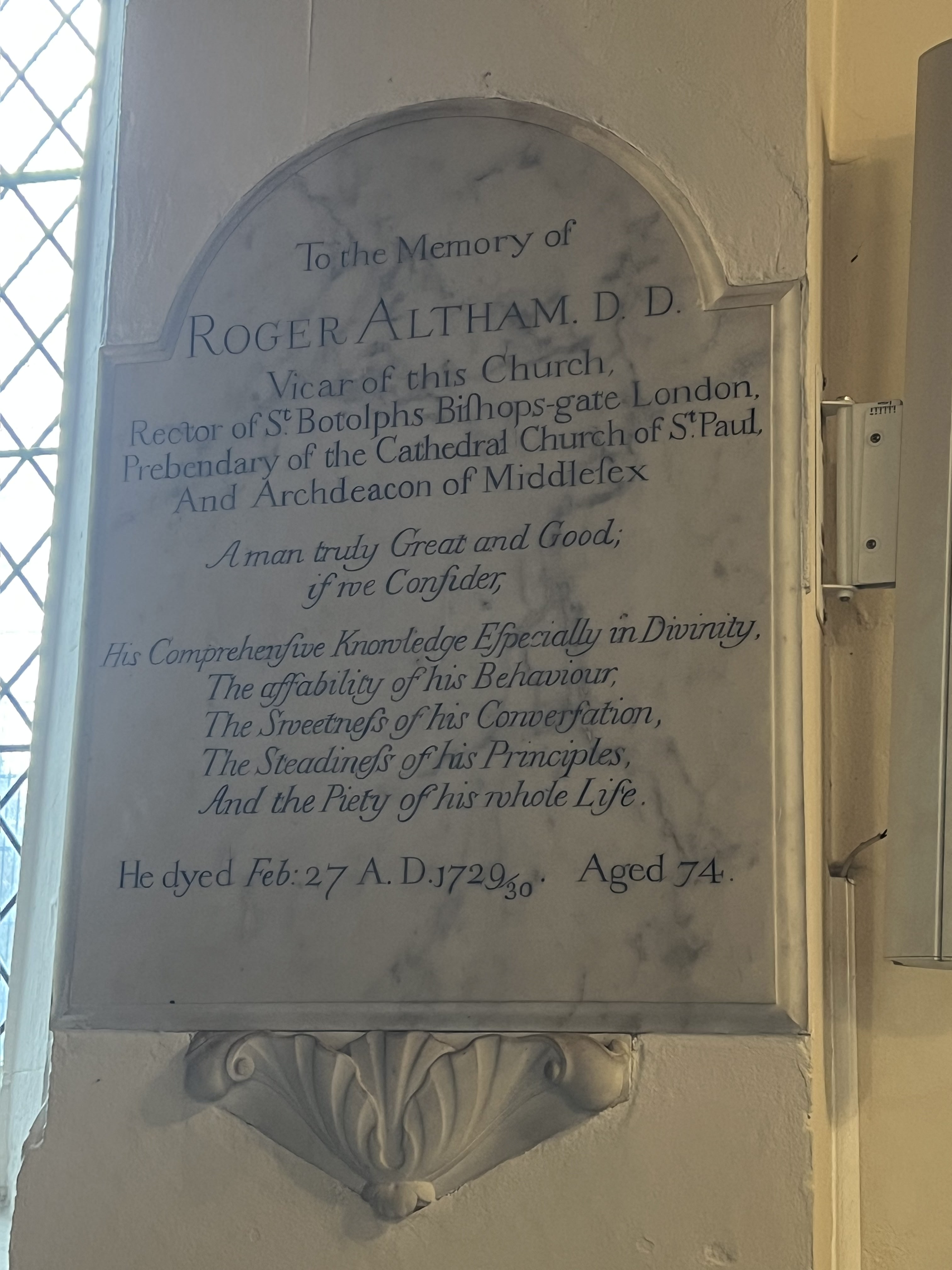
Rev Roger Altham's Wall tablet.

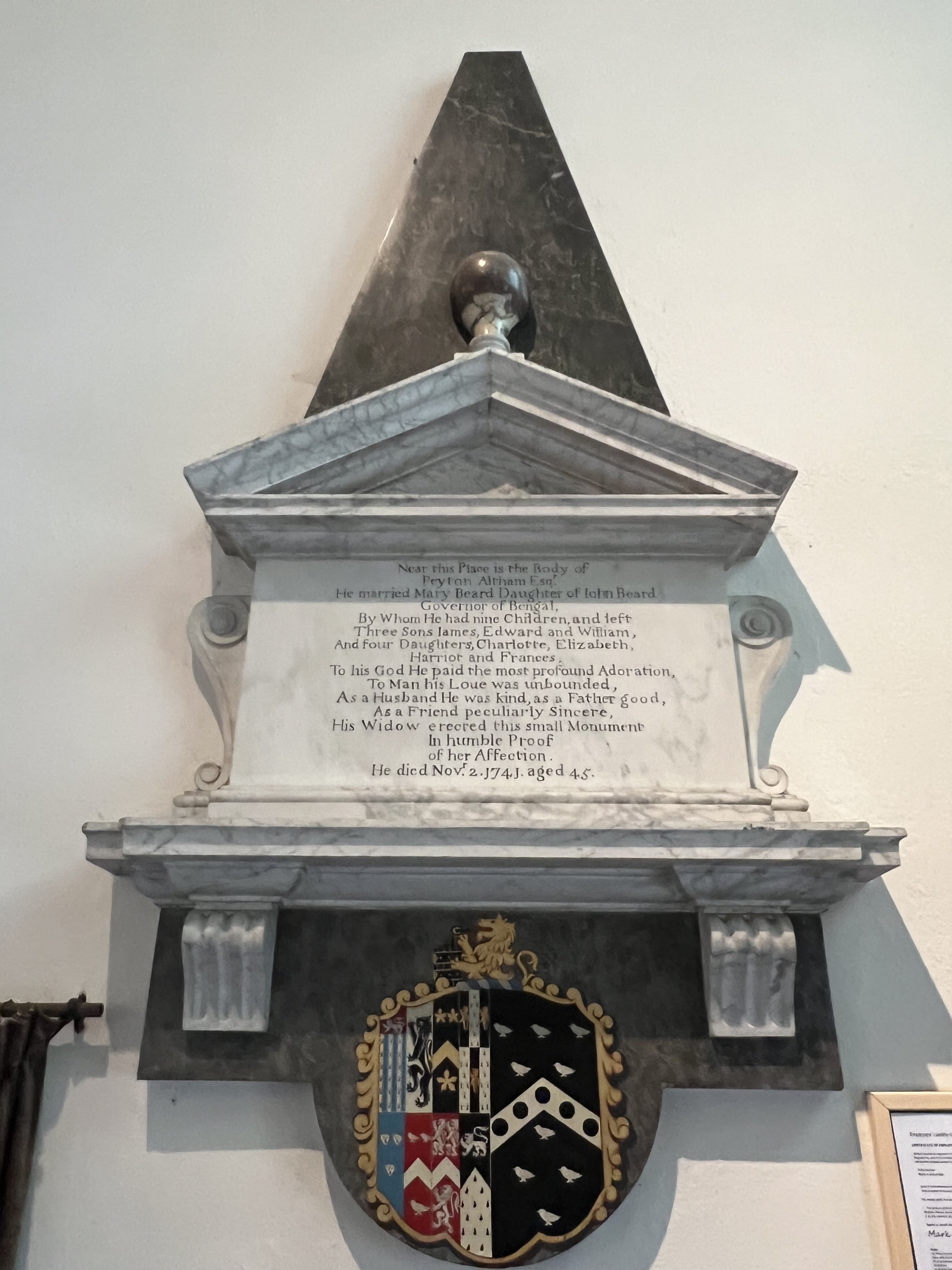
Peyton Altham's Wall tablet with large Coat of Arms.

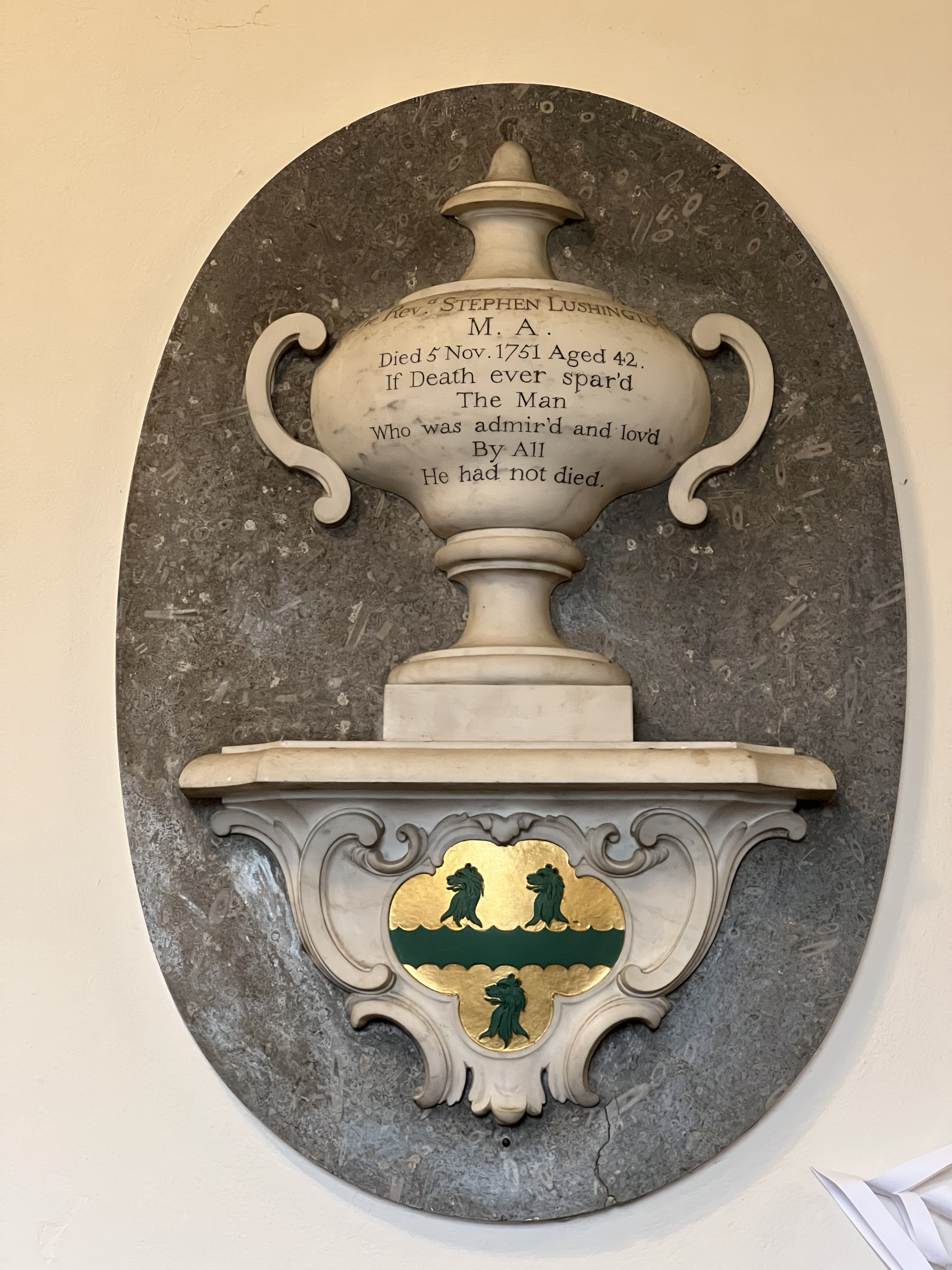
Rev Stephen Lushington's Wall tablet.

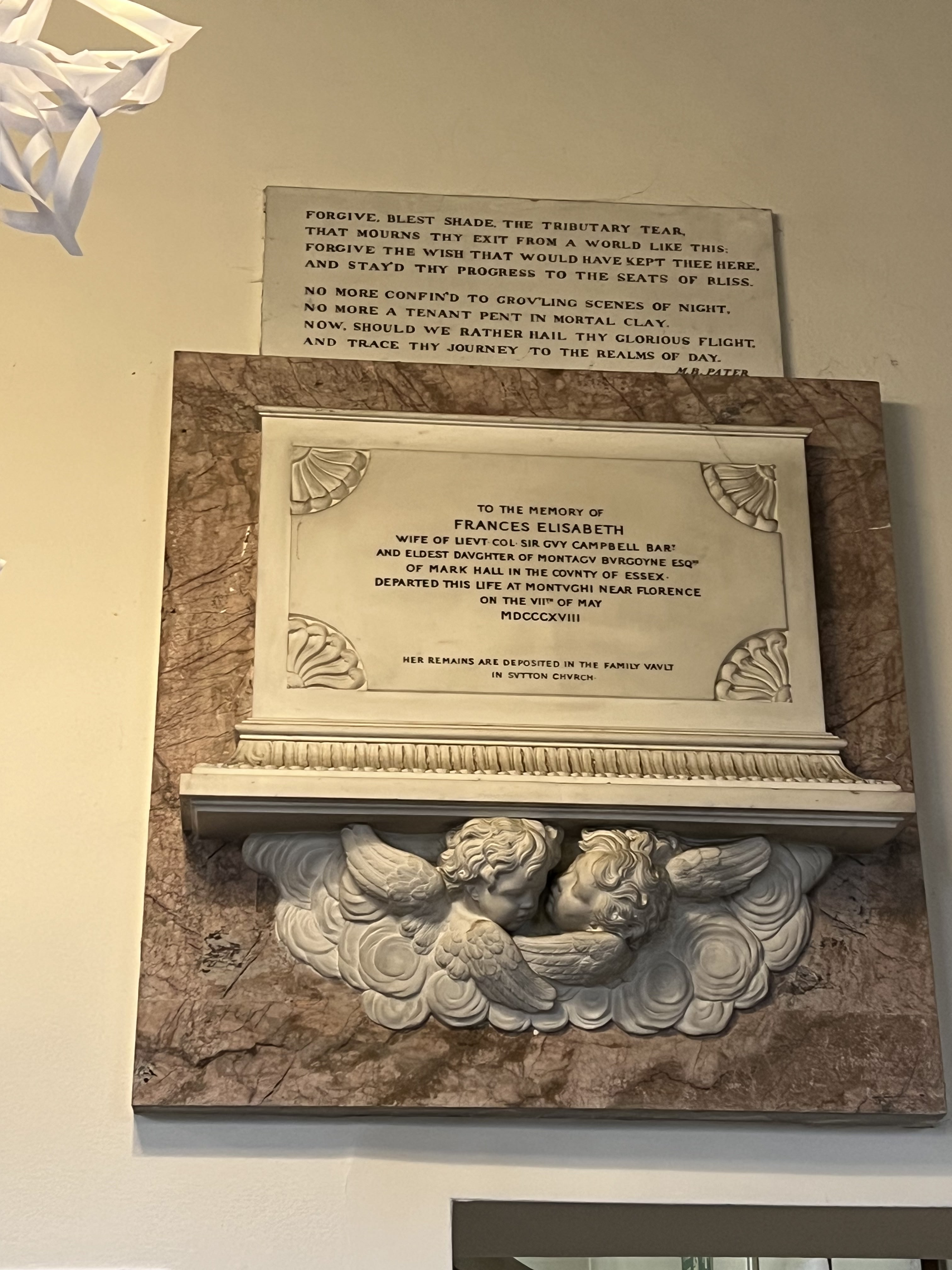
Frances Elisabeth Campbell née Burgoyne's Wall tablet.

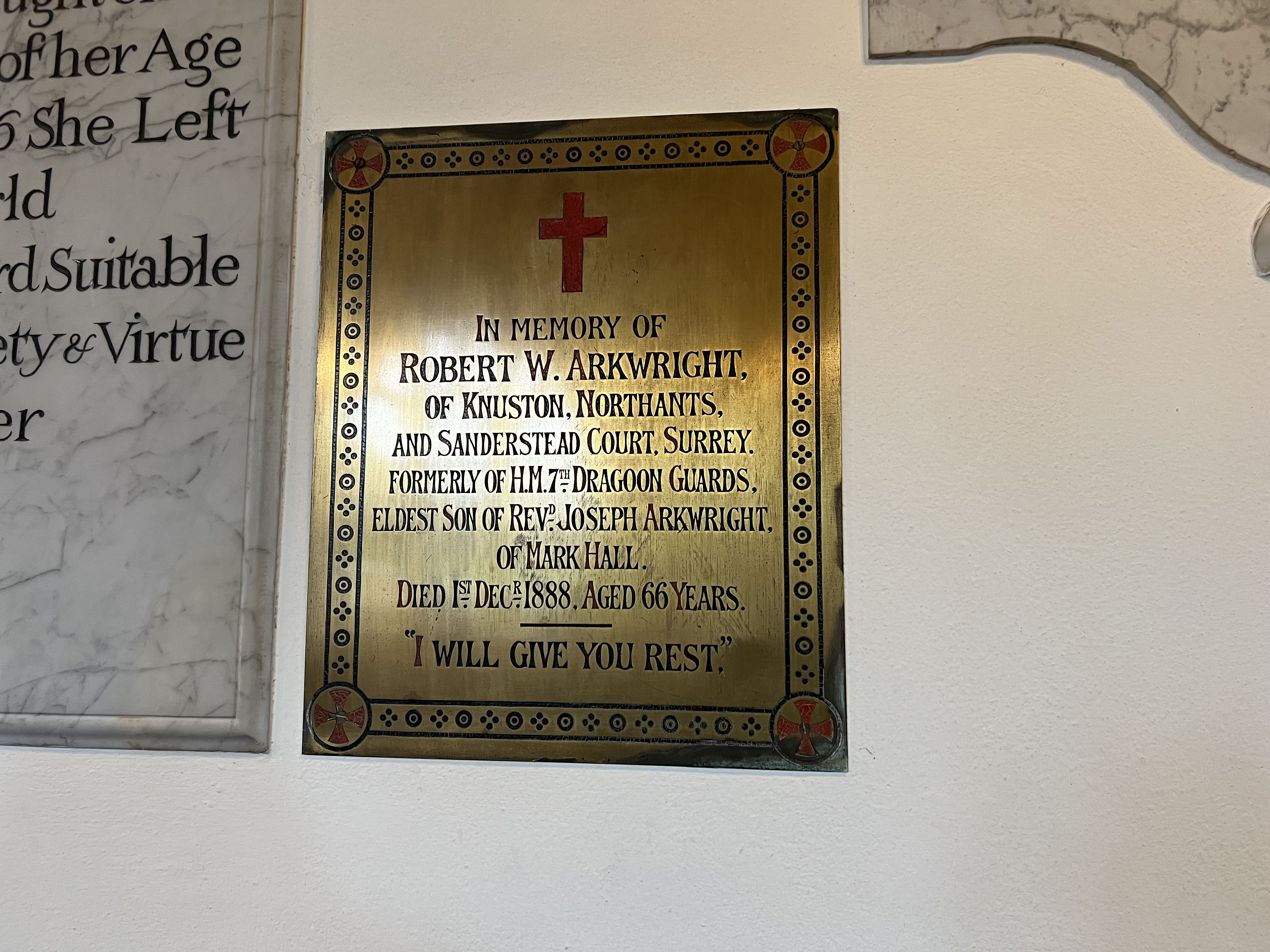
Robert Arkwright monument.

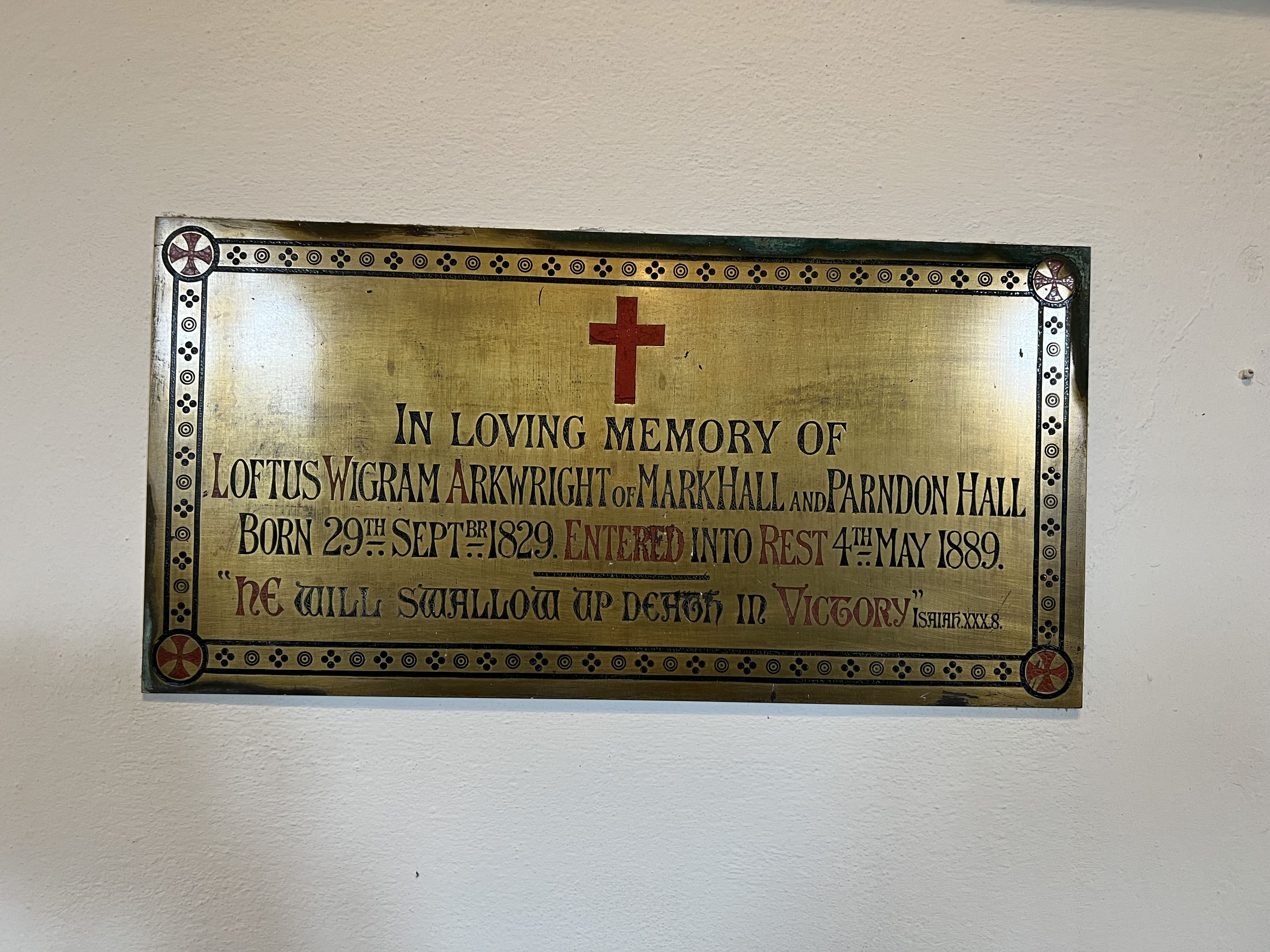
Loftus Arkwright monument.

== Vicars of St Mary's ==
=== List of priests ===
The following priests have served as vicar of St Mary's since the 12th century:

- c.1198: Roger and Anfred, Priests of Latton, possibly joint Rectors.
- c.1220–1234: Ernold, Chaplain of Latton, fell to his death from the church tower in 1234.
- c.1260: Simon, Rector, living in c.1260.
- c.1317: Walter mentioned in 1317 as late rector.
- c.1358: Roger de Overe, recorded in 1358, was the first known vicar.
- 1361: William of Gaddesden, instituted vicar in 1361, was a canon of Latton.
- 1430–1503: There were 14 successive vicars, at least 7 of whom left on resignation.
- 1503–1600: 8 Vicars. TBC.
- 1600–32: Rev. Thomas Denne.
- 1632–80: Rev. Thomas Denne Jr.
- 1680–1705: Rev. Michael Altham.
- 1705–30: Rev. Roger Altham
- 1730–58: Rev. James Altham, vicar of Latton
- 1758–1801: 1 Vicar. TBC.
- 1801–c.1820: Rev. Charles Miller (retired from Latton).
- 1820–50: Rev. Joseph Arkwright.
- 1850–64: Rev. Julius Arkwright.
- 1864–70: Rev. William Pitt Wigram
- 1871–86: Rev. William Oliver
- 1886–1905: Rev. Spencer Nairne.
- 1905–42: Rev. Austin Oliver
- 1951–54: Rev. J. Oliver White.
- 1954–c.1960: Rev. Peter O'beirne.
- 1963–69: Rev. Ian Stuchbery
- 1969–79: Rev. Barry Rose
- 1979–88: Rev. John Pratt
- Bef.1992–Retired 1999: Rev. Peter Beech
- 1999–2007: Rev. Shaun Conlon
- 2008–present: Rev. Lynn Hurry.

=== Census information ===
Census date	Name	Position	Location	Ref.
1841	Rev. Joseph Arkwright	Vicar of Latton	Mark Hall, Latton	
1851	Rev. Julius Arkwright	Vicar of Latton	Latton Vicarage	
1861	Rev. Samuel W Lloyd	Curate of Latton	Latton Vicarage	
1871	Rev. William Oliver	Vicar of Latton	Latton Vicarage	
1881	Rev. William Oliver	Vicar of Latton	Latton Vicarage	
1891	Rev. Spencer Nairne	Vicar of Latton	Latton Vicarage	
1901	Rev. Spencer Nairne	Vicar of Latton	Latton Vicarage	
1911	Rev. Austin Oliver	Vicar of Latton	Latton Vicarage	
1921	Rev. Austin Oliver	Vicar of Latton	Latton Vicarage	
1939‡	Rev. Austin Oliver	Vicar of Latton	Latton Vicarage ‡ England and Wales Register	
