= New English Bible =

English translation of the Bible completed in 1970

The New English Bible
- Full name: The New English Bible
- Abbreviation: NEB
- OT published: 1970
- NT published: 1961
- Complete Bible published: 1970
- Textual basis: NT: R.V.G. Tasker Greek New Testament. OT: Biblia Hebraica (Kittel) 3rd Edition.
- Translation type: Dynamic equivalence
- Publisher: Oxford University Press, Cambridge University Press
- Copyright: Oxford University Press and Cambridge University Press 1961, 1970
- Genesis 1:1–3 In the beginning of creation, when God made heaven and earth, the earth was without form and void, with darkness over the face of the abyss, and a mighty wind that swept over the surface of the waters. God said "Let there be light", and there was light; John 3:16 God loved the world so much that he gave his only Son, that everyone who has faith in him may not die but have eternal life.

The New English Bible (NEB) is an English translation of the Bible. The New Testament was published in 1961 and the Old Testament (with the Apocrypha) was published on 16 March 1970. In 1989, it was significantly revised and republished as the Revised English Bible.

== Background ==
Near the time when the copyright to the English Revised Version (ERV) was due to expire (1935), the Oxford University Press (OUP), and the Cambridge University Press (CUP), who were the ERV copyright holders, began investigations to determine whether a modern revision of the ERV text was necessary. In May 1946 G. S. Hendry, along with the Presbytery of Stirling and Dunblane produced a notice, which was presented to the General Assembly of the Church of Scotland, indicating that the work of translating should be undertaken in order to produce a Bible with thoroughly "modern English." After the work of delegation was finished, a general conference was held in October 1946 where it was determined that a completely fresh translation should be undertaken rather than a revision as originally suggested by the University Presses of Oxford and Cambridge.

== Translation ==
In due time, three committees of translators and one committee of literary advisers were enlisted to produce the New English Bible. Each of the translation committees was responsible for a different section of the Bible: the Old Testament, the Apocrypha, and the New Testament.

The work of translating was typically undertaken in this fashion: A member, or members, of one of the committees would produce a draft of a book, or books, of the Bible (typically from the section in which they were assigned) and submit the draft to the section committee. Occasionally a scholar outside the committee would be invited to participate in this phase of the translation process and was asked to submit a draft of the book or books with which he or she had renowned experience. This draft was then distributed among the members of the appropriate committee. Members of the committee would then meet and discuss the translation choices made in the draft. The draft that resulted from this meeting of the concerned committee was then sent to the committee of literary advisers, who would revise the draft in co-operation with the translators. When a consensus on the draft was reached, the final draft would be sent on to the Joint Committee, which was head over the four sub-committees.

For the Old Testament the translators primarily made use of the Masoretic Text as presented by Rudolf Kittel in his 3rd Edition of the Biblia Hebraica (1937). In addition to the Masoretic Text, the translators also made use of the Dead Sea Scrolls, the Samaritan Pentateuch, the Greek Septuagint, the Aramaic Targums, and the Syriac Peshitta.

For the Apocrypha the translators made the decision to follow The Old Testament in Greek according to the Septuagint, edited by Henry Barclay Swete. Also, the translators made use of the Codex Sinaiticus (for the Book of Tobit), Theodotion's translation of the Apocrypha (for The Song of the Three, Daniel and Susanna, and Daniel, Bel and the Snake (sometimes referred to as the Dragon)), Codex Vaticanus Graecus 1209 (for Sirach), Codex 248 (also for Sirach), and Robert Lubbock Bensly's Latin text The Fourth Book of Ezra for 2 Esdras.

For the New Testament the New English Bible translators relied on a large body of texts including early Greek New Testament manuscripts, early translations rendered in other languages (those aside from Greek), and the quotations of early Christian writers and speakers. The main source text of the New English Bible's New Testament can be found in The Greek New Testament, edited by R.V.G. Tasker and published by the University Presses of Oxford and Cambridge (1964).

== Form ==
The translators of the New English Bible chose to render their translation using a principle of translation called dynamic equivalence (also referred to as functional equivalence or thought-for-thought translation). C. H. Dodd, Vice-chairman and Director of the Joint Committee, commented that the translators "...conceived our task to be that of understanding the original as precisely as we could... and then saying again in our own native idiom what we believed the author to be saying in his."

This method of translation is in contrast to the traditional translations of the Authorized Version (King James Version), English Revised Version, American Standard Version, Revised Standard Version, and others, which place an emphasis on word-for-word correspondence between the source and target language. Dodd goes on to summarize the translation of the New English Bible as "...free, it may be, rather than literal, but a faithful translation nevertheless, so far as we could compass it."

As a result, the New English Bible is necessarily more paraphrastic at times in order to render the thoughts of the original author into modern English.

== Reception ==
Biblical scholar F. F. Bruce declared that "To the sponsors and translators of the New English Bible the English speaking world owes an immense debt. They have given us a version which is contemporary in idiom, up-to-date in scholarship, attractive, and at times exciting in content". T. S. Eliot, however, commented that the New English Bible "astonishes in its combination of the vulgar, the trivial and the pedantic". Henry Gifford argued that "the new translators … kill the wonder". The British publisher and author Adam Nicolson, in his 2003 book on the King James Bible, criticized the newer translation for its 'anxiety not to bore or intimidate'.

The New English Bible was produced before gender-neutral language was used in translations of the Bible. Thus, the NEB rendered pronouns (and other parts of speech) using traditional English grammatical construction, translating "he" from the original manuscripts to refer either to a male human being or to a sexually undistinguished human being. This traditional construction has now become controversial in some Christian circles (as in other parts of English-speaking societies), and a recent revision of the New English Bible entitled "The Revised English Bible" incorporates gender-inclusive language.

The NEB with the Apocrypha is one of the versions authorized to be used in services of the Episcopal Church.

== Contributors and sponsors ==
- Baptist Union of Great Britain and Ireland
- British and Foreign Bible Society
- Church of England
- Church of Scotland
- Congregational Church in England and Wales
- Council of Churches for Wales
- Irish Council of Churches
- London Yearly Meeting of the Religious Society of Friends
- Methodist Church of Great Britain
- National Bible Society of Scotland
- Presbyterian Church of England

== Members of the committees ==
=== Chairman of the Joint Committee responsible for translation ===
The Most Rev Donald Coggan, Archbishop of York (1961–1974).

=== Old Testament committee ===
W. D. McHardy, B. J. Roberts, A. R. Johnson, John Adney Emerton, C. A. Simpson, Sir Godfrey Driver (convener), L. H. Brockington, N. H. Snaith, N. W. Porteous, H. H. Rowley, C. H. Dodd (ex officio), P. P. Allen (secretary).

=== Apocrypha committee ===
Prof W.D. McHardy (Convener), Prof W. Barclay, Prof W.H. Cadman, Dr G.D. Caird, Prof C.F.D. Moule, Prof J.R. Porter, G.M. Styler.

=== New Testament Committee ===
Prof C.H. Dodd (Convener), Dr G.S. Duncan, Dr W.F. Howard, Prof G.D. Kilpatrick, Prof T.W. Manson, Prof C.F.D. Moule, J.A.T. Robinson, G.M. Styler, Prof R.V.G. Tasker.

=== Literary Committee ===
Prof Sir Roger Mynors, Prof Basil Willey, Sir Arthur Norrington, Anne Ridler, Canon Adam Fox, Dr John Carey, and the Conveners of the Translation Panels.

=== Scholarly Associates ===
Prof G.W. Anderson, Rev Matthew Black, Prof J.Y. Campbell, J.A.F. Gregg, H. St J. Hart, Prof F.S. Marsh, Prof John Mauchline, Dr H.G. Meecham, Prof C.R. North, Prof O.S. Rankin, Dr Nigel Turner.

== Publications ==
- New English Bible. Bible Society. 1 January 1990. ISBN 978-0564002016.
- New English Bible, with Apocrypha. OUP. 1 January 1970. ISBN 978-1117062006.
