= Brussels Faculty for Protestant Theology =

Coordinates: 50°50′7.97″N 4°24′15.89″E

The Faculté Universitaire de Théologie Protestante (Faculty of Protestant Theology in Brussels; FUTP) is a private university in Brussels, Belgium. Its official languages are French and Dutch.

== Sources ==
- Faculty of Protestant Theology in Brussels
