= Richard Brown (professor) =

Richard Brown (c. 1712 – 1780?) was an academic at the University of Oxford. He matriculated at Hart Hall, Oxford, in 1727 at the age of 15, obtaining his Bachelor of Arts degree from Trinity College in 1731. He was made a fellow of the college in 1734, when he obtained his Master of Arts degree, with his Bachelor of Divinity degree following in 1742 and a doctorate in divinity in 1752. He was appointed as Lord Almoner's Professor of Arabic at the University of Oxford in 1748, and also became Regius Professor of Hebrew at Oxford in 1774, holding both positions until 1780. He was an ordained clergyman in the Church of England; a canon of St Paul's Cathedral, he was also appointed perpetual curate of St Mary's Paddington in 1756.
