= Thomas Neal (Hebraist) =

English churchman and academic

Thomas Neal or Neale (1519–1590?) was an English churchman and academic, who became Regius Professor of Hebrew.

== Life ==
Born about 1519 at Yeate in Gloucestershire, Neale became in 1531 a scholar of Winchester College with the support of his maternal uncle, Alexander Belsire, a Fellow of New College, Oxford. On 19 June 1538 he was chosen probationer of New College, and in 1540 admitted perpetual fellow. He graduated B.A. 16 May 1542, M.A. 11 July 1546, and was admitted B.D. 23 July 1556.

Before he took orders, Neal had acquired a reputation as a Greek and Hebrew scholar and theologian, and was given a pension by Sir Thomas Whyte. He travelled in France, probably during the time of the Edwardian reformation; and appears to have been there in 1556. Soon after the beginning of Mary I's reign he had been made chaplain to Edmund Bonner, bishop of London, and appointed rector of Thenford in Northamptonshire.

On the accession of Elizabeth I, Neal went to Oxford, and in 1559 was made Regius Professor of Hebrew. He entered himself as a commoner of Hart Hall, and built lodgings for himself at the west end of New College, and opposite to Hart Hall. He took a prominent part in the entertainment of Elizabeth at Oxford in 1566, and wrote an account of it, published in Anthony Wood's History and Antiquities of Oxford, and used as the source for Richard Stephens's Brief Rehearsal.

In 1569, concerned because of his Catholicism, Neal resigned his professorship and retired to Cassington near Oxford.

== The Nag's Head Story ==
Neal has been taken as the ultimate authority for the Nag's Head Story, told against Matthew Parker by Catholic opponents of the Church of England, as related by William Arthur Shaw in the Dictionary of National Biography. The statements that Bonner sent him to Bishop Anthony Kitchin to dissuade him from assisting in the consecration of Parker, and that he was present at the pretended ceremony at the Nag's Head, rest on assertions of John Pits.

== Works ==
Neal's works were:

- Dialogus in adventum serenissimæ Reginæ Elizabethæ gratulatorius inter eandem Reginam et D. Rob. Dudleium comitem Leicestriæ et Acad. Ox. cancellarium, together with Collegiorum scholarumque publicarum Ac. Ox. Topographica delineatio. These Latin verses were written to accompany drawings of the colleges and public schools of Oxford by John Bearblock. Neal's work was first printed, inaccurately, by Miles Windsor in Academiarum Catalogus, London, 1590. It was then reprinted by Thomas Hearne, Oxford, 1713, at the end of his edition of Dodwell de Parma Equestri; also by John Nichols in his Progresses of Elizabeth, i. 225; by the Oxford Historical Society (vol. viii.), and reproduced in facsimile, Oxford, 1882.
- Commentarii Rabbi Davidis Kimhi in Haggæum, Zachariam, et Malachiam prophetes ex Hebraico idiomate in Latinum sermonem traducti, Paris, 1557, dedicated to Cardinal Reginald Pole.

Thomas Tanner also assigned to Neal:

- A translation "of all the Prophets" out of the Hebrew.
- A translation of Commentarii Rabbi Davidis Kimhi super Hoseam, Joelem, Amos, Abdeam, Micheam, Nahum, Habacuc, et Sophoniam (dedicated to Queen Elizabeth).
- Rabbinicæ quædam observationes ex prædictis commentariis possibly identical with Breves quædam observationes in eosdem prophetes partim ex Hieronymo partim ex aliis probatæ fidei authoribus decerptæ, appended to the Commentarii.

== Notes ==
Attribution

This article incorporates text from a publication now in the public domain: Lee, Sidney, ed. (1894). "Neal, Thomas". Dictionary of National Biography. Vol. 40. London: Smith, Elder & Co.
