= Roger Altham =

Roger Altham was Archdeacon of Middlesex from 9 February 1717 until his death on 27 February 1730.

Altham was born in Eastwick, Hertfordshire and educated at Christ Church, Oxford. He was Rector of St Andrew Undershaft with St Mary Axe; then of St Botolph, Bishopsgate; and finally of St Mary the Virgin, Latton, Essex. He was buried in the chancel at Latton.

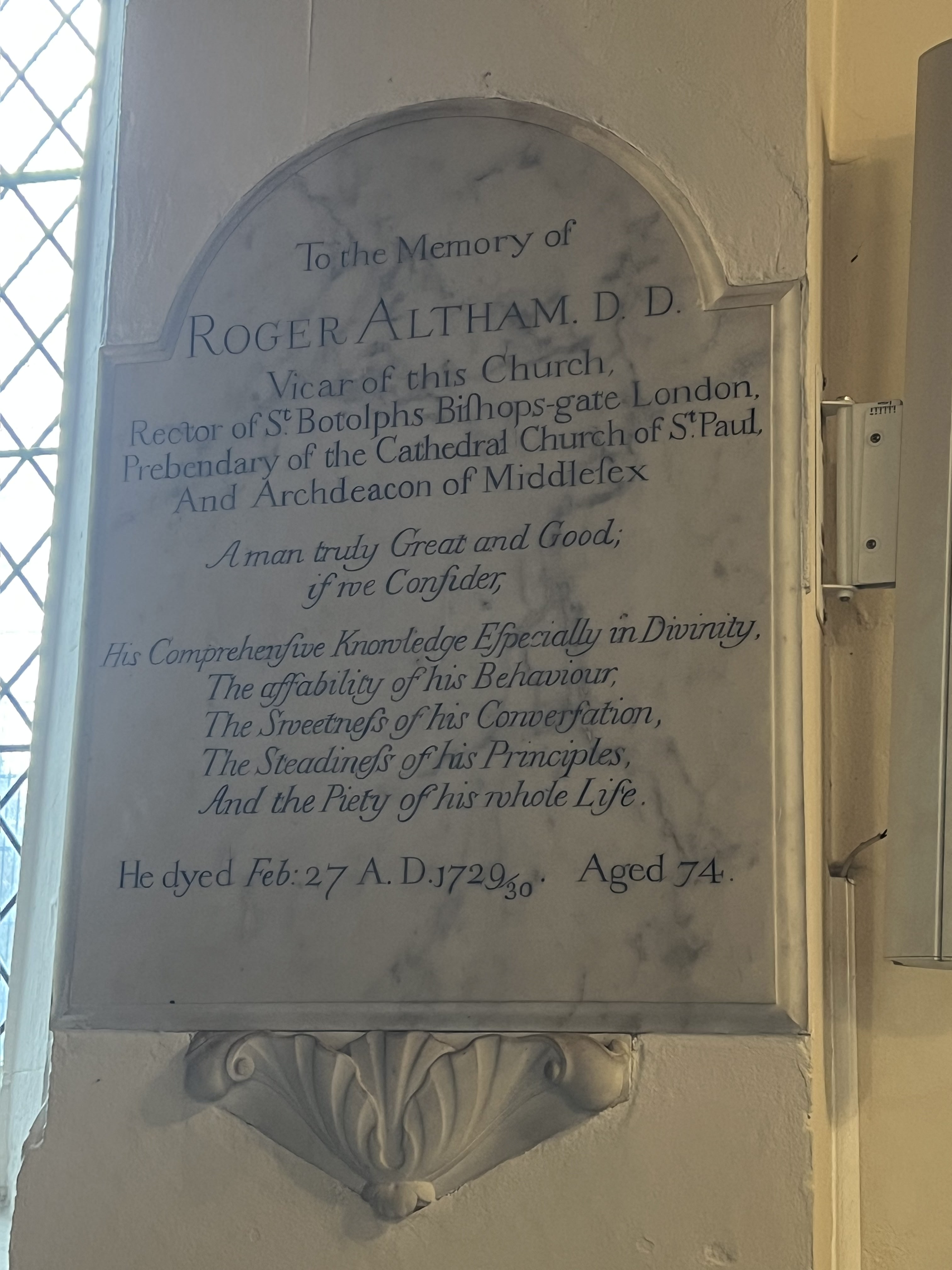
Monument to Rev Roger Altham in St Mary-at-Latton Church

== Notes ==
Church of England titles
Preceded by William Lancaster	Archdeacon of Middlesex; 1717–1730	Succeeded by Daniel Waterland
