= Benjamin Blayney =

English divine and Hebraist, best known for his revision of the King James Version

Benjamin Blayney (1728 – 20 September 1801) was an English divine and Hebraist, best known for his editorial revision of the King James Version of the Bible.

== Life ==
Blayney was educated at Worcester College, Oxford (B.A. 1750), and became fellow and later vice-principal of Hertford College. He was awarded B.D. in 1768.

He was employed by the Clarendon Press to prepare a corrected edition of the King James Version of the Bible. This appeared in 1769, but most of it was destroyed by fire in the Bible warehouse, Paternoster Row, London. Blayney then studied Hebrew; he received the degree of D.D., was appointed Regius professor of Hebrew in 1787, and in the same year was made canon of Christ Church, Oxford.

On 20 September 1801, he died at his rectory of Poulshot, Wiltshire.

== Principal works ==
- A Dissertation by Way of Inquiry into the True Import . . . of Daniel ix. 24 to the End," etc., 1775–97, which was translated into German by J. D. Michaelis;
- a new translation of Jeremiah and Lamentations, 1784;
- an edition of the Samaritan Pentateuch in Hebrew characters, 1790;
- a new translation of Zechariah, 1797.
