= Godfrey Rolles Driver =

English Orientalist

- Born: 20 August 1892
- Died: 22 April 1975
- Occupations: Biblical scholar, philologist
- Father: Samuel Rolles Driver
- Awards: Commander of the Order of the British Empire (1958); Fellow of the British Academy (1939); Burkitt Medal (1953); Military Cross; Leverhulme Medal (1939)

Sir Godfrey Rolles Driver CBE MC FBA (20 August 1892 – 22 April 1975), known as G. R. Driver, was an English Orientalist noted for his studies of Semitic languages and Assyriology.

== Life ==
The son of Samuel Rolles Driver, the "most distinguished British Hebraist of the late nineteenth and early twentieth centuries", Driver was born in Oxford, England and educated at Winchester College and New College, Oxford, (1911–1915) where he won the Pusey and Ellerton and Senior Kennicott Hebrew Scholarships and the Gaisford Prize for Greek prose (1913) and for Greek verse (1916).

After serving in World War I, with tasks as varied as hospital work, postal censorship, and intelligence, in 1919, he was named fellow and classical tutor in Magdalen College, Oxford. He remained at Oxford for his entire career, ultimately as Professor of Semitic Philology, and produced a steady stream of scholarly articles on subjects including vocabulary of the Old Testament, and words and texts in the Akkadian, Arabic, Aramaic, Hebrew, and Syriac languages.

From 1937 to 1938 Driver was the president of the Society for Old Testament Study, unusually for a two-year period. In 1959, he was the president of the third congress of The International Organization for the Study of the Old Testament.

He directed the translation of the Old Testament for the New English Bible from its inception in 1949, completed and first published in 1970. He was knighted in 1968.

== Selected works ==
- The Dispersion of the Kurds in Ancient Times, Oxford, 1921.
- Letters of the first Babylonian dynasty, OECT III, 1925.
- Studies in Cappadocian Tablets, Paris, 1927.
- Semitic Writing: From Pictograph to Alphabet, 1948 (Schweich Lectures for 1944).
- The Babylonian Laws, with J. C. Miles, Oxford, 1952–1955.
- Aramaic Documents of the Fifth Century B.C., Oxford, 1954 (Abridged and Revised edition 1957).
- Canaanite Myths and Legends, Edinburgh: T. & T. Clark, 1956.
- The Judaean scrolls: The problem and a solution, Oxford: Blackwell, 1965.

== Sources ==
- Wiseman, D. J. (1976). "Obituary: Sir Godfrey Driver". Bulletin of the School of Oriental and African Studies. 39 (1). University of London: Cambridge University Press: 160–163. doi:10.1017/S0041977X00052186. JSTOR 616193. S2CID 177082336.
- CDLI Wiki.
- F.F. Bruce, Godfrey Rolles Driver (1892–1975), The Witness, 105, No. 1255, pp. 266–267 (July 1975).
- Emerton, J. A. (19 January 2016). Driver, Godfrey Rolles, 1892-1975. Oxford University Press. pp. 344–362. ISBN 978-0-19-725983-2.
