= Paul W. Franks =

British philosopher and Jewish Studies professor (born 1964)

Paul Franks
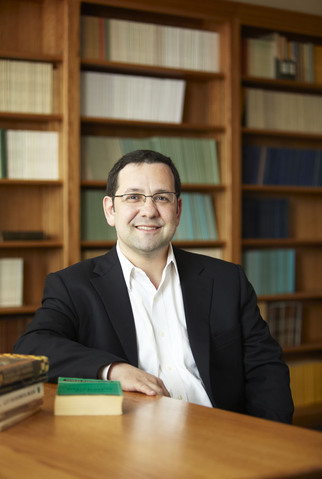
- Born: Paul Walter Franks; 1964 (age 61–62); Newcastle upon Tyne, England
- Spouse: Hindy Najman

Academic background
- Education: Balliol College, Oxford (M.A., B.A.); Harvard University (PhD)
- Thesis: Kant and Hegel on Esotericism of Philosophy (1993)
- Doctoral advisor: Stanley Cavell
- Other advisors: Frederick Neuhouser, Hilary Putnam

Paul Walter Franks (born 1964) is a British philosopher who is the Robert F. and Patricia Ross Weis Professor of Philosophy and Judaic Studies at Yale University.

== Biography ==
Franks graduated with his PhD from Harvard University in 1993. Franks' dissertation, entitled Kant and Hegel on the Esotericism of Philosophy, was supervised by Stanley Cavell and won the Emily and Charles Carrier Prize for a Dissertation in Moral Philosophy at Harvard University. He completed his B.A (First Class) and M.A, in Philosophy, Politics and Economics at Balliol College, Oxford. Prior to this, Franks received his general education at the Royal Grammar School, Newcastle, and studied classical rabbinic texts at Gateshead Talmudical College.

Franks' primary areas of research and specialization are Jewish philosophy, Immanuel Kant, German idealism, metaphysics, epistemology, the foundations of human sciences, and post-Kantian approaches within Analytic philosophy and Continental philosophy. His 2005 book "All or Nothing": Systematicity, Transcendental Arguments, and Skepticism in German Idealism, has been described as a "brilliant and highly stimulating book," "a truly indispensable book," which "attempts to answer a significant question ("Why were the German Idealists convinced that Philosophy had to have a single absolute principle, and that it had to be absolutely systematic?"), [and to] create a historical reconstruction of the emergence of German Idealism and show how German Idealism is still very much relevant to us today."

He has taught at Indiana University (Bloomington) between 1996 and 2000, University of Notre Dame from 2000 to 2004, the University of Chicago in 2003, and the University of Toronto from 2004 to 2011. Franks has been Faculty Fellow at the Jackman Humanities Institute, University of Toronto; Brackenbury Scholar at Balliol College, Oxford; Lady Davis Graduate Research Fellow at the Hebrew University; Mrs. Giles F. Whiting Dissertation Fellow in the Humanities at Harvard University; Junior Fellow of the Michigan Society of Fellows; and Fellow of the American Council of Learned Societies.

Franks was appointed as the inaugural holder of the Senator Jerahmiel S. and Carole S. Grafstein Chair in Jewish Philosophy at the University of Toronto in 2008. He was appointed in 2011 to a senior position at Yale University, in New Haven, Connecticut. He teaches in the Department of Philosophy, the Program in Judaic Studies, the Department of Religious Studies, and the Department of Germanic Languages and Literatures.

In December 2012, Franks gave a lecture entitled "From Indeterminacy to Idealism" at the opening of the Forschungskolleg Analytic German Idealism at the University of Leipzig. In 2014, he gave a keynote lecture, "What becomes of Jewish Law in the wake of Emancipation?" at the British Association of Jewish Studies annual meeting in Dublin, Ireland. In 2015, he gave the keynote address, "Schelling and Maimon on the World-Soul", at the annual meeting of the North American Schelling Society in Newfoundland, Canada. Franks gave the M. Holmes Hartshorne lecture at Colgate University in 2018. Honoring his teachers, he spoke at Harvard University's Celebration of the Life and Work of Hilary Putnam in 2016, at Harvard University's Celebration of the Life and Work of Stanley Cavell in 2018, and at Harvard University Center for Jewish Studies' event, "The Legacy of Isadore Twersky: Twenty Five Years after his Passing" in 2023.

== Family ==
Franks lives in Riverdale, New York, with his wife, Hindy Najman, who is Oriel and Laing Professor of the Interpretation of Holy Scripture at Oxford University, and their children Ezra and Marianna. He is a frequent attendee of The Kehila of Riverdale (led by Dina Najman).

== Publications ==
=== Books ===
- All or Nothing: Skepticism, Transcendental Arguments and Systematicity in German Idealism Harvard University Press, Cambridge, MA, 2005 ISBN 0-674-01888-5
- Franz Rosenzweig: Theological and Philosophical Writings, translated, edited annotated and commented upon, with Michael L. Morgan, Hackett Publishing Company, 2000

=== Selected articles ===
- “Was ist Haskala?”, in What is Enlightenment? Questions for the Eighteenth Century, ed. Liliane Weissberg, Berlin: Deutsches Historisches Museum, 2024,135-139
- "Samson Raphael Hirsch, “Eighteenth Letter”, from Iggerot Tzafun, translated by Paul Franks, in Modern Jewish Theology: The First One Hundred Years, 1835-1935, eds. Samuel Kessler and George Kohler, Philadelphia, PA: Jewish Publication Society, 2023
- “Translation, Bildung, and Dialogue: Central Concepts of German-Jewish Religious Thought 1783-1936”, in The Oxford History of Modern German Theology, Vol. 1, eds. Kevin Vander Schel and Grant Kaplan, Oxford: Oxford University Press, 2023, 143-168
- “Analytic Hasidism: Reflections on Sam Lebens’ Principles of Judaism”, European Journal of Philosophy of Religion (2022), 14: 1-23
- “Reform and/or Revolution: Comments on Karin de Boer, Kant’s Reform of Metaphysics”, Kantian Review (2022), 27: 127-132
- “Reason, Faith, and the Overcoming of Shame”, in Strauss, Spinoza, and Sinai: Orthodox Judaism and Questions of Faith, eds. Jeffrey Bloom, Alec Goldstein, and Gil Student, New York, NY: Kodesh Press, 2022, 33-48
- “Beyond the Ban: Eliyahu Dessler’s Proposal for a Synthesis of Talmudic Analysis, Musar, and Hasidism”, in Contemporary Uses and Forms of Hasidut, ed. Shlomo Zuckier, New York, NY: Ktav: 2021, 109-147
- “Redeeming God, Redeeming Redemption”, Journal of Jewish Thought & Philosophy 29 (2021), 168-175
- "Contraction and Withdrawal: Midrashic Roots of Philosophical Conceptions of Ẓimẓum", in Ẓimẓum in Modernity, eds. Agathe Bielik-Robson and Daniel Weiss, Bloomington, IN: Indiana University Press, 2020, 35-53
- "From World-Soul to Universal Organism: Maimon's Hypothesis and Schelling's Physicalisation of a Platonic-Kabbalistic Concept", in Schelling: Freedom, Nature, and Systematicity, ed. G. Anthony Bruno, Oxford: Oxford University Press, 2020, 71-92
- "Mythology, Essence and Form: The Jewish Reception of Schelling's Philosophy", International Journal of Theology, 80, Nos. 1-2 (2019), 71-89
- "Fichte's Kabbalistic Realism: Summons as ẓimẓum", in Fichte's Foundations of Natural Right: A Critical Guide ed. Gabriel Gottlieb Cambridge University Press, 2016
- "Fichte's Position: Anti-Subjectivism, Self-Awareness, and Self-Location in the Space of Reasons", in The Cambridge Companion to Fichte eds. David James and Guenter Zoeller Cambridge University Press, 2016
- "Methodology in the Kantian and Post-Kantian Tradition", in The Oxford Handbook to Philosophical Methodology eds. Herman Cappelen, Tamar Gendler and John Hawthorne Oxford University Press, 2016
- "'Nothing comes from Nothing': Judaism, the Orient and the Kabbalah in Hegel's Reception of Spinoza", in The Oxford Handbook of Spinoza, ed. Michael Della Rocca Oxford University Press, 2015
- "Rabbinic Idealism and Kabbalistic Realism: Jewish Dimensions of Idealism and Idealist Dimensions of Judaism", in The Impact of Idealism, ed. Nicholas Boyle and Liz Disley, Vol. IV, Religion, ed. Nicholas Adams Cambridge University Press, 2013
- "Inner Anti-Semitism or Kabbalistic Legacy: German Idealism's Relation to Judaism", in The International Yearbook of German Idealism, eds. Fred Rush and Jürgen Stolzenberg Walter de Gruyter, 2010
- "Jewish Philosophy after Kant: The Legacy of Salomon Maimon", in The Cambridge Companion to Modern Jewish Philosophy, eds. Michael L. Morgan and Peter Eli Gordon, Cambridge University Press, 2007
- "From Quine to Hegel: Naturalism, Anti-Realism, and Maimon's Question Quid Facti", in German Idealism: Contemporary Perspectives, ed. Espen Hammer, Routledge, 2007
- "Serpentine Naturalism and Protean Nihilism: Transcendental Philosophy in Anthropological Post-Kantianism, German Idealism, and Neo-Kantianism", in The Oxford Handbook of Continental Philosophy, eds. Brian Leiter and Michael Rosen, Oxford University Press, 2007
- "Everyday Speech and Revelatory Speech in Rosenzweig and Wittgenstein", in Philosophy Today special issue on Jewish philosophy 2006
- "What should Kantians learn from Maimon's skepticism?", in The Philosophy of Salomon Maimon and its Place in the Enlightenment, ed., Gideon Freudenthal, Amsterdam: Kluwer Press 2003
- "From Kant to Post-Kantian Idealism", in Proceedings of the Aristotelian Society, Supplementary Volume 76, 2002; All or Nothing: Systematicity and Nihilism in Jacobi, Reinhold, and Maimon, in The Cambridge Companion to German Idealism, ed. Karl Ameriks, Cambridge University Press, 2000
- "Transcendental Arguments, Reason, and Skepticism: Contemporary Debates and the Origins of Post-Kantian Idealism", in Transcendental Arguments: Problems and Prospects, ed. Robert Stern, Mind Association Occasional Series, Oxford: Oxford University Press, 2000
