= Hedley Sparks =

British biblical scholar and Catholic priest

The Reverend Hedley Sparks FBA
- Oriel Professor of the Interpretation of Holy Scripture, University of Oxford
- In office: 1952–1976
- Other post: Cadbury Professor of Theology (1946–1952)

Orders
- Ordination: 1933 (deacon); 1934 (priest) by Thomas Strong

Personal details
- Born: Hedley Frederick Davis Sparks; 14 November 1908 Stoke Newington, County of London, United Kingdom
- Died: 22 November 1996 (aged 88) Canterbury, Kent, UK
- Education: St Edmund's School
- Alma mater: Brasenose College, Oxford

Hedley Frederick Davis Sparks, FBA (14 November 1908 – 22 November 1996) was a British biblical scholar and Church of England priest. From 1946 to 1952, he was Cadbury Professor of Theology at the University of Birmingham. From 1952 to 1976, he was Oriel Professor of the Interpretation of Holy Scripture at the University of Oxford.

== Early life ==
Sparks was born on 14 November 1908 in Stoke Newington, County of London. He was the only child of the Revd Frederick Sparks (1847–1908) and his second wife, Blanche Barnes. His father died 5 weeks before his son's birth, at the age of 61. He was educated at St Edmund's School, then an all-boys private school in Canterbury, Kent. His school fees and living costs were paid for by the Clergy Orphan Corporation. In February 1927, he successfully underwent an exam and interview to win a scholarship to Brasenose College, Oxford: he was the only candidate that year. He matriculated into Brasenose College in October 1927, and studied theology and music for the next three years. In 1930, he graduated from the University of Oxford with a first class honours Bachelor of Arts (BA) degree in theology; he did not sit the final exams for music.

His high class bachelor's degree won him the Senior Hulme Scholarship. This funded three further years of study and was usually used to fund a second degree. However, he chose to train for ordination and entered Ripon Hall, an Anglican theological college in 1930. He additionally studied Hebrew and Aramaic under G. A. Cooke, the Regius Professor of Hebrew, and Assyriology under Stephen Langdon. In 1932, he spent the summer term at Marburg University in Germany where he studied under Rudolf Bultmann and Karl Budde.

== Career ==
Sparks was ordained in the Church of England as a deacon on 24 September 1933 by Thomas Strong, the Bishop of Oxford, and as a priest in 1934. From 1933 to 1936, he combined his curacy at All Saints Church, Oxford, and a position as an honorary chaplain of Ripon Hall. Additionally, he assisted H. J. White with the production of a new version of the Vulgate New Testament between 1933 and White's death in July 1934. He resigned from Ripon Hall in 1936 because of the increasing influence of the Modern Churchmen's Union on the theological college.

In 1936, Sparks left Oxford and moved to Durham in the north of England. He was a lecturer in the theology at Durham University between 1936 and 1946. He specialised in teaching Christian doctrine and Patristics, and later also taught Hebrew. During World War II, he was additionally censor of Hatfield College and University College: the two colleges had been combined for the duration of the war.

At the end of the war, Sparks was looking to move again. He was interviewed for the Samuel Davidson Professorship of Old Testament Studies at the University of London, but was not successful. He then applied for the appointment of Cadbury Professor of Theology at the University of Birmingham. He was successful and took up the chair in October 1946. He developed the theology syllabus and expanded the department's academics to create an ecumenical faculty; this included the first Roman Catholic, H. Francis Davis (Vice-Principal of Oscott College) as a visiting lecturer. From 1947 to 1952, he was Dean of the Faculty of Arts. In 1949, he was awarded a Doctor of Divinity (DD) degree by his alma mater, the University of Oxford: the DD is the most senior degree awarded by the university.

In November 1951, Sparks was elected Oriel Professor of the Interpretation of Holy Scripture at the University of Oxford. He took up the appointment on 1 October 1952. The chair had been linked with a canonry at Rochester Cathedral but this was separated before the 1951 election. The chair remained linked with Oriel College, Oxford and he was duly elected a fellow of the college. He gave a number of lecture series through the Faculty of Theology and Religion. In addition, though he was not required to, he provided tutorials to undergraduate theology students at his college. From 1953 to 1977, he was Editor of the Journal of Theological Studies. In 1957, G. N. Clarke retired as Provost of Oriel College. Sparks was encouraged to apply to replace him, but upon learning that it would mean giving up his chair, chose not to. In 1962, Sparks was the president of the Society for Old Testament Study. From 1961 to 1968, he was Rector of All Saints Church, Wytham, in addition to his academic positions.

In 1976, he retired from academia.

== Later life ==
On his retirement, Sparks moved to Canterbury, Kent. He was granted Permission to Officiate in the Diocese of Canterbury which he held until his death.

Sparks died on 22 November 1996 at the Nunnery Fields Hospital, Canterbury. On 28 November, his funeral service was held at Canterbury Cathedral and he was buried in New Romney, Kent.

== Personal life ==
Sparks lived with his mother until her death in 1951. On 25 August 1953, he married Margaret Joan Davy. Having been born in 1930, she was more than two decades younger than her husband. Together they had three children: two sons and one daughter.

== Honours ==
In 1959, Sparks was elected a Fellow of the British Academy (FBA). He was awarded two honorary Doctor of Divinity (DD) degrees: by the University of St Andrews in 1963 and by the University of Birmingham in 1983. In 1980, he was elected to an honorary fellowship by Oriel College.

== Selected works ==
- Sparks, H. F. D. (1944). The Old Testament in the Christian church. London: SCM Press.
- Sparks, H. F. D. (1952). The Formation of the New Testament. London: SCM Press.
- Sparks, H. F. D. (1964). A synopsis of the Gospels: Volume 1 – The Synoptic Gospels with the Johannine parallels. Oxford: A & C Black.
- Sparks, H. F. D. (1974). A synopsis of the Gospels: Volume 2 – The Gospel according to St John with the Synoptic parallels. Oxford: A & C Black.
- Sparks, H. F. D., ed. (1984). The Apocryphal Old Testament. Oxford: Clarendon Press. ISBN 978-0198261773.

Academic offices
Preceded by David Capell Simpson	Oriel Professor of the Interpretation of Holy Scripture, University of Oxford; 1952–1976	Succeeded by James Barr
