= Frances Young =

British Christian theologian and Methodist minister (born 1939)

The Reverend Frances Young OBE FBA
- Born: Frances Margaret Young; 1939 (age 86–87)
- Employer: University of Birmingham
- Title: Edward Cadbury Professor of Theology
- Term: 1986–2005
- Successor: David C. Parker

The Reverend Frances Margaret Young, OBE, FBA (born 1939) is a British Christian theologian and Methodist minister. She is emeritus professor at the University of Birmingham.

== Biography ==
Young taught theology at the University of Birmingham from 1971, becoming the Edward Cadbury Professor and head of the Department of Theology in 1986. During her time at the university, she also served as dean of the Faculty of Arts (1995–97) and pro-vice-chancellor (1997–2002). In 1984, she was ordained as a Methodist minister, and has combined preaching in a local Circuit and pursuing her academic career. In 1998, she was awarded an OBE for services to theology and in 2004, elected a Fellow of the British Academy.

In 2005, she retired from the university. On 15 November 2005, she preached at the opening service of the 8th General Synod of the Church of England, the first Methodist and the first woman to preach at the five-yearly inauguration ceremony. She delivered her sermon at the Eucharist service at which the then-Archbishop of Canterbury, Rowan Williams, presided.

She served as editor of volumes 39–43 of the Studia Patristica and wrote academic and more popular theological writings, drawing on her work on the New Testament and on Christianity in its formative centuries, but also on her experience as the mother of a son (Arthur) who was born with profound physical and mental disabilities.

== Bibliography ==
- Sacrifice and the death of Christ, Philadelphia : Westminster Press, 1975, ISBN 9780664242107
- The Myth of God Incarnate, ed. John Hick, London : SCM Press, 1977, ISBN 9780334010654
- Incarnation and Myth : The Debate Continued, ed. Michael Goulder, London : SCM Press, 1979, ISBN 9780802811998
- Can these dry bones live? : the excitement of theological study, London : SCM Press Ltd, 1982, ISBN 9780334049654
- From Nicaea to Chalcedon : a guide to the literature and its background, London : SCM Press, 1983, ISBN 9780334004950
- Meaning and Truth in 2 Corinthians, with David F Ford, London : SPCK, 1987, ISBN 9780281043170
- The art of performance: towards a theology of Holy Scripture, London : Darton, Longman and Todd, 1990, ISBN 9780232517798
- Face to Face: A Narrative Essay in the Theology of Suffering, Edinburgh : T. & T. Clark, 1991, ISBN 9780567291776
- The Making of the Creeds, London : SCM Press, 1991, ISBN 9780334024880
- Virtuoso Theology: The Bible and Interpretation, Eugene, OR : Wipf and Stock Publishers, 1993, ISBN 9781579109776
- Theology Of The Pastoral Letters, Cambridge; New York : Cambridge University Press, 1994, ISBN 9780521379311
- Dare We Speak of God in Public?, London: Mowbray, 1995, ISBN 9780264673660
- Biblical Exegesis and the Formation of Christian Culture, Cambridge: Cambridge University Press, 1997, ISBN 9780511583216
- Brokenness and Blessing: Towards a Biblical Spirituality, Grand Rapids, Mich. : Baker Academic, 2007, ISBN 9780801035043
- God's Presence: A Contemporary Recapitulation of Early Christianity, Cambridge: Cambridge University Press 2013, ISBN 1107642787 ISBN 978-1107642782
- Arthur's Call: A Journey of Faith in the Face of Severe Learning Disability, London : SPCK, 2014, ISBN 0281070466, ISBN 9780281070466
- All of You are one in Christ Jesus - Young, Frances M. All of You Are One in Christ Jesus : Bible Studies for the Fifth World Conference on Faith and Order. Santiago De Compostela, 1993. Geneva: Commission on Faith and Order, World Council of Churches, 1993. Print.
