= Venetia Burney =

English accountant and teacher, suggested name of Pluto (1918–2009)

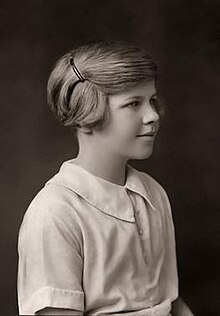
- Venetia Burney aged 11
- Born: Venetia Katharine Douglas Burney; 11 July 1918
- Died: 30 April 2009 (aged 90); Banstead, England
- Known for: Naming Pluto
- Spouse: Edward Maxwell Phair (m. 1947–2006)
- Children: Patrick Phair
- Parents: Charles Fox Burney; Ethel Wordsworth Madan
- Relatives: Falconer Madan, grandfather

Venetia Katharine Douglas Burney (married name Phair, 11 July 1918 – 30 April 2009) was an English accountant and teacher. She is remembered as the first person to suggest the name Pluto for the dwarf planet discovered by Clyde Tombaugh in 1930. At the time, she was 11 years old.

== Biography ==
Venetia Burney grew up in North Oxford. She was the daughter of Rev. Charles Fox Burney, Oriel Professor of the Interpretation of Holy Scripture at Oxford, and his wife Ethel Wordsworth Burney (née Madan). She was the granddaughter of Falconer Madan (1851–1935), Librarian of the Bodleian Library of the University of Oxford. Falconer Madan's brother, Henry Madan (1838–1901), Science Master of Eton, had in 1878 suggested the names Phobos and Deimos for the moons of Mars.

On 14 March 1930, Falconer Madan read the story of the new planet's discovery in The Times and mentioned it to his granddaughter Venetia. She suggested the name Pluto – the Roman god of the Underworld, who was able to make himself invisible − and Madan forwarded the suggestion to astronomer Herbert Hall Turner, who cabled his American colleagues at Lowell Observatory. Clyde Tombaugh liked the proposal because it started with the initials of Percival Lowell, who had predicted the existence of Planet X, which they thought was Pluto because it was coincidentally in that position in space. On 1 May 1930, the name Pluto was formally adopted for the new celestial body. Whether she was really the first person to propose the name has been doubted on plausibility grounds, but the historical fact is that she was credited as such.

Most news coverage done at the time of the discovery of Pluto didn't mention her and the role she played in terms of naming Pluto was mostly forgotten about until a 1984 article from Sky & Telescope publicized her role.

Burney was educated at Downe House School in Berkshire and at Newnham College, Cambridge, where she studied economics from 1938–41. After graduation she became a chartered accountant. Later she became a teacher of economics and mathematics at girls' schools in southwest London teaching until she retired in the 1980s. She was married to Edward Maxwell Phair from 1947 until his death in 2006. Her husband, a classicist, later became housemaster and head of English at Epsom College. She died on 30 April 2009, aged 90, in Banstead in Surrey. She was buried at Randalls Park Crematorium in Leatherhead in Surrey.

Only a few months before the reclassification of Pluto from a planet to a dwarf planet, with a debate going on about the issue, she said in an interview, "At my age, I've been largely indifferent [to the debate]; though I suppose I would prefer it to remain a planet."

== Legacy ==
The asteroid 6235 Burney and the Burney impact basin on Pluto were named in her honour. In July 2015 the New Horizons spacecraft was the first to visit Pluto and carried an instrument named Venetia Burney Student Dust Counter in her honour. Mihaly Horanyi, Principal Investigator for the instrument, and Alan Stern visited Mrs Phair at home to present her with a plaque, certificate, and spacecraft model.

Massachusetts rock band The Venetia Fair came up with their name after reading about Venetia Phair, shortly after Pluto was reclassified as a dwarf planet.
