= John Barton (theologian) =

British theologian (born 1948)

The Reverend John Barton FBA
- Born: 17 June 1948 (age 78); London, England
- Title: Oriel and Laing Professor of the Interpretation of Holy Scripture (1991–2014)
- Spouse: Mary Burn (m. 1973)

Academic background
- Education: University of Oxford

Academic work
- Discipline: Biblical studies
- Sub-discipline: Old Testament studies; Old Testament prophets; biblical canon; biblical interpretation; Old Testament theology
- Institutions: University of Oxford

John Barton FBA (born 17 June 1948) is a British Anglican priest and biblical scholar. From 1991 to 2014, he was the Oriel and Laing Professor of the Interpretation of Holy Scripture at the University of Oxford and a Fellow of Oriel College. In addition to his academic career, he has been an ordained and serving priest in the Church of England since 1973.

His research interests and extensive publications have been in the areas of the Old Testament prophets, the biblical canon, biblical interpretation, and Old Testament theology. From 2010 to 2013, he researched Ethics in Ancient Israel, having been funded by a Leverhulme Major Research Fellowship. Barton is a foreign member of the Norwegian Academy of Science and Letters and has been a Fellow of the British Academy since 2007.

As of 2013, he continued to assist in services and other activities in the parish of Abingdon, in which he resides.

== Early life and education ==
John Barton was born on 17 June 1948 in London, England. He was educated at Latymer Upper School, a private school in Hammersmith, London. He studied theology at Keble College, Oxford, graduating with a Bachelor of Arts (BA) degree in 1969: as per tradition, his BA was promoted to a Master of Arts (MA) degree in 1973.

He moved to Merton College, Oxford, to undertake postgraduate research, and completed his Doctor of Philosophy (DPhil) degree in 1974. His doctoral thesis was titled The Relation of God to Ethics in the Eighth Century Prophets. He was awarded a Doctor of Letters (DLitt) degree, a higher doctorate, by the University of Oxford in 1988.

== Career ==
=== Academic career ===
Barton was a Junior Research Fellow at Merton College, Oxford, between 1973 and 1974. In 1974, he was elected a Fellow of St Cross College, Oxford, and made a university lecturer in theology (Old Testament) at the University of Oxford. He was promoted from lecturer to Reader in Biblical Studies in 1989. In 1991, he was made Oriel and Laing Professor of the Interpretation of Holy Scripture and therefore elected a Fellow of Oriel College, Oxford. From 2010 to 2013 he held a Leverhulme Major Research Fellowship for work on a project entitled Ethics in Ancient Israel. He stepped down as Oriel and Laing Professor in 2014, and was made an Emeritus Fellow of Oriel College. Since 2014, he has been a Senior Research Fellow of Campion Hall, Oxford, a Jesuit-run permanent private hall of the University of Oxford.

=== Additional roles ===
He has been a Delegate of Oxford University Press since 2005. From 2004 to 2010 he was joint editor of the Journal of Theological Studies and is one of two Anglophone editors for the German monograph series Beihefte zur Zeitschrift für die alttestamentliche Wissenschaft, published in Berlin.

== Ordained ministry ==
In 1973, Barton was ordained in the Church of England as a deacon and priest. Concentrating on his academic career, he did not hold an ecclesiastical position until 1979 when he was made chaplain of St Cross College, Oxford. He continued this ministry until he left St Cross College for Oriel College, Oxford in 1991. In addition to his professorial appointment, he served as Canon Theologian of Winchester Cathedral between 1991 and 2003. He assists in services and other activities in the parish of Abingdon, in which he resides.

From 2000 to 2005 and from 2009 to 2010 he served on the church's General Synod, representing the clergy of the University of Oxford. He sits on the Governing Body of Ripon College Cuddesdon, and was elected President of Modern Church in 2011. In 2013, Barton resigned from the office due to ill health, but he continues to serve on the editorial board of the periodical, Modern Church.

== Research interests ==
Barton's research interests have included the Old Testament prophets, the biblical canon, biblical interpretation, Old Testament theology, as well as biblical ethics.

== Honours ==
In 2007, Barton was elected a Fellow of the British Academy (FBA), the United Kingdom's national academy for the humanities and social sciences. He is also a Corresponding Fellow of the Norwegian Academy of Science and Letters.

In 1998, Barton was awarded an honorary Doctor of Theology (Dr. theol.) degree by the University of Bonn.

A History of the Bible: The Book and Its Faiths was shortlisted for the 2020 Wolfson History Prize and won the 2019 Duff Cooper Prize. It was adapted for radio and broadcast on BBC Radio 4 in December 2020.

== Books ==
=== Sole authorship ===
1. Barton, John (1980). Amos's Oracles against the Nations. Society for Old Testament Study monograph series. Vol. 6. Cambridge: Cambridge University Press. ISBN 9780521225014. OCLC 5241529.
2. ——— (1984). Reading the Old Testament: Method in Biblical Study. London & Philadelphia, PA: Darton, Longman & Todd & Westminster Press. ISBN 9780664245559. OCLC 10507716.
3. ——— (1986). Oracles of God: Perceptions of Ancient Prophecy in Israel after the Exile. London: Darton, Longman & Todd. ISBN 9780232516661. OCLC 16922767.
4. ——— (1989). Love Unknown: Meditations on the Death and Resurrection of Jesus. London: SPCK. ISBN 9780281044405. OCLC 869153450.
5. ——— (1988). People of the Book? The Authority of the Bible in Christianity. Bampton lecture, 1988. Philadelphia, PA: Westminster John Knox Press. ISBN 9780664250669. OCLC 18739764.
6. ——— (1991). What is the Bible?. London: SPCK. ISBN 9780281045280. OCLC 927643761.
7. ——— (1995). Isaiah 1-39. Old Testament Guides. Sheffield, UK: Sheffield Academic Press. ISBN 9781850755418. OCLC 463409488.
8. ——— (1997). The Spirit and the Letter: Studies in the Biblical Canon. London: SPCK. ISBN 9780281050116. OCLC 475988728.
9. ——— (1997). Making the Christian Bible. London: Darton, Longman & Todd. ISBN 9780232517873. OCLC 38040897. - American edition How the Bible came to be
10. ——— (1998). Ethics and the Old Testament. London: SCM Press. ISBN 9780334027188. OCLC 925328303.
11. ——— (2001). Joel and Obadiah: A Commentary. Old Testament Library. Louisville, KY: Westminster John Knox. ISBN 9780664219666. OCLC 46685175.
12. ——— (2003). Understanding Old Testament Ethics. Louisville, KY: Westminster John Knox. ISBN 9780664225964. OCLC 491719760.
13. ——— (2005). Living Belief: Being Christian, Being Human. London: Continuum. ISBN 9780826488510. OCLC 60590135.
14. ——— (2007). The Nature of Biblical Criticism. Louisville, KY: Westminster John Knox. ISBN 9780664225872. OCLC 1056607006.
15. ——— (2007). The Old Testament: Canon, Literature and Theology: Collected Essays of John Barton. Society for Old Testament Study monographs. Abingdon, Oxon: Routledge. ISBN 9780754654513. OCLC 1057586494.
16. ——— (2012). The Theology of the Book of Amos. Old Testament Theology. New York & Cambridge: Cambridge University Press. ISBN 9780521855778. OCLC 809074127.
17. ——— (2014). Ethics in Ancient Israel. Oxford: Oxford University Press. ISBN 9780199660438. OCLC 902755851.
18. ——— (2019). A History of the Bible: The Story of the World's Most Influential Book. New York: Viking. ISBN 9780525428770. OCLC 1110588094.
19. ——— (2022). The Word: On Translations of the Bible. London: Allen Lane. ISBN 9780241448816. OCLC 1350405277.

=== Joint authorship ===
1. ———; Morgan, Robert (1988). Biblical Interpretation. Oxford Bible series. Oxford: Oxford University Press. ISBN 9780192132567. OCLC 862147418.
2. ———; Bowden, Julia (2004). The Original Story: God, Israel and the World. London: Darton, Longman & Todd. ISBN 9780232524857. OCLC 255303000.

=== Edited ===
1. ———; Balentine, Samuel E., eds. (1994). Language, Theology, and the Bible: Essays in Honour of James Barr. Oxford: Clarendon Press. ISBN 9780198261919. OCLC 907242123.
2. ———; Reimer, David J., eds. (1996). After the Exile: Essays in Honour of Rex Mason. Macon, GA: Mercer University Press. ISBN 9780865545243. OCLC 35317733.
3. ———, ed. (1998). The Cambridge Companion to Biblical Interpretation. Cambridge Companions to Religion. Cambridge, UK: Cambridge University Press. ISBN 9780521485937. OCLC 864267009.
4. ———; Sauter, Gerhard, eds. (2000). Offenbarung und Geschichten: ein deutsch-englisches Forschungsprojekt. Beiträge zur theologischen Urteilsbildung. Vol. 10. Frankfurt am Main: Peter Lang. ISBN 9783631367230. OCLC 247059146. - English version Revelation and Story: Narrative Theology and the Centrality of Story
5. ———; Muddiman, John, eds. (2001). The Oxford Bible Commentary. Oxford: Oxford University Press. ISBN 9780199277186. OCLC 870267288.
6. ———, ed. (2002). The Biblical World. Vol. 1. New York & London: Routledge. ISBN 9780415275736. OCLC 659913169.
7. ———; Rowland, Christopher, eds. (2003). Apocalyptic in History and Tradition. Journal for the Study of the Pseudepigrapha, Supplement series. Vol. 43. Sheffield: Sheffield Academic Press. ISBN 9780826462084. OCLC 954735187.
8. ———; Wolter, Michael, eds. (2003). Die Einheit der Schrift und die Vielfalt des Kanons/The Unity of Scripture and the Diversity of the Canon. Beihefte zur Zeitschrift für die neutestamentliche Wissenschaft und die Kunde der älteren Kirche (BZNW). Vol. 118. Berlin: W. de Gruyter. ISBN 9783110176384. OCLC 899037209.
9. ———, ed. (2004). The Biblical World. Vol. 2. New York & London: Routledge. ISBN 9780415275743. OCLC 659913172.
10. ———; Stavrakopoulou, Francesca, eds. (2010). Religious Diversity in Ancient Israel and Judah. London: T & T Clark International. ISBN 9780567032164. OCLC 876469857.
11. ———, ed. (2016). The Hebrew Bible: a Critical Companion. Princeton & Oxford: Princeton University Press. ISBN 9780691154718. OCLC 953843897.

== Festschrift ==
1. Dell, Katharine J.; Joyce, Paul M., eds. (2013). Biblical Interpretation and Method: essays in honour of John Barton. Oxford: Oxford University Press. ISBN 9780199645534. OCLC 857990808.

== Personal life ==
In 1973, Barton married Mary Burn. Together they have one daughter.

Barton lives in the parish of Abingdon.

Academic offices
Preceded by Ernest Nicholson	Oriel and Laing Professor of the Interpretation of Holy Scripture; 1991–2014	Succeeded by Hindy Najman
Non-profit organization positions
Preceded by John Saxbee	President of Modern Church; 2011–2013	Succeeded by Linda Woodhead
