= D.C. Simpson =

D.C. Simpson may refer to:

- Dana Claire Simpson, American cartoonist.
- David Capell Simpson, British biblical scholar.
- Douglas Colborne Simpson, Canadian architect.
