= Geoffrey Madan =

English belletrist (1895–1947)

Geoffrey Spencer Madan (6 February 1895 – 6 July 1947) was an English belletrist, and a collector and creator of aphorisms, many of which are recorded in his Notebooks.

== Biography ==
Geoffrey Spencer Madan was born on 6 February 1895, in Oxford, the son of Falconer Madan, a Fellow of Brasenose College, Oxford and Bodley's Librarian, and Frances Jane Hayter. He had a sister, Ethel, who married Charles Fox Burney.

He was educated at Summer Fields School, Oxford, Eton College (to which he won the top scholarship in 1907) and Balliol College, Oxford. While still at school he earned a day's holiday for the whole school by the excellence of his account of Eton written in Herodotean Greek, and embarked on a correspondence and friendship with A. C. Benson. Madan went up to Balliol College in 1913. There he read Classics, and he made a number of lifelong friends, including Harold Macmillan, Cyril Asquith and Ronald Knox.

In 1914 Madan's university career was interrupted by the First World War. He was commissioned in the King's Own Royal Lancaster Regiment, and was wounded in the Mesopotamian campaign in 1916.

In 1919 Madan married Marjorie, the daughter of Sir Saxton Noble, Baronet. In 1920 Marjorie gave birth to their one child, Nicola.

Between 1920 and 1924 Madan was employed in the City of London; but in 1924 a severe attack of meningitis forced him to retire. A private income enabled him to devote the remainder of his life to his interests, which included wine, old silver and (above all) books.

Madan's daughter Nicola married Gordon Campbell, later Lord Campbell of Croy.

Madan died suddenly in London on 6 July 1947, aged 52.

== The Notebooks ==
Madan had an eye for aphorisms, and each Christmas between 1929 and 1933 sent a small anthology from his notebooks to his friends. A limited typescript edition was circulated privately in 1949 after his death, and a further selection was made for an edition published by the Oxford University Press in 1981. The editors (J.A.Gere and John Sparrow) provided a biographical introduction, and Harold Macmillan contributed a foreword.

The New York Review of Books called the Notebooks "the best example of a twentieth-century Commonplace book".

Examples of his published aphorisms include:

- "The dust of exploded beliefs may make a fine sunset".
- "Alive, in the sense that he can't legally be buried."
- "Never assume that habitual silence means ability in reserve."
