= Ernest Nicholson =

British religious scholar (1938–2013)

The Reverend Ernest Nicholson FBA MRIA
- Born: Ernest Wilson Nicholson; 26 September 1938; Portadown, Northern Ireland
- Died: 22 December 2013 (aged 75); Oxford, England
- Awards: Burkitt Medal (2009)

Academic background
- Education: Trinity College, Dublin; University of Glasgow; Westcott House, Cambridge
- Doctoral advisor: Cecil Weir

Academic work
- Discipline: Divinity
- Sub-discipline: Old Testament studies
- Institutions: Trinity College, Dublin; University of Cambridge; University of Oxford

Ernest Wilson Nicholson, FBA, MRIA (26 September 1938 – 22 December 2013) was a British scholar of the Old Testament and Church of England priest. He was Oriel Professor of the Interpretation of Holy Scripture at the University of Oxford from 1979 to 1990 and served as Provost of Oriel College, Oxford, from 1990 to 2003.

== Early life ==
Nicholson was born on 26 September 1938 in Portadown, Northern Ireland. Having failed the Eleven-plus exam to attend grammar school, he attended the local Secondary Technical School. He later transferred to a grammar school, Portadown College, following the advice of a priest during a Boys' Brigade holiday.

In 1956, he matriculated into Trinity College, Dublin to study Hebrew and Semitic languages. He graduated Bachelor of Arts (BA) in 1960, which was promoted to Master of Arts (MA) in 1964. He then undertook postgraduate study at Glasgow University. He completed a Doctor of Philosophy (PhD) degree in 1964 under the supervision of Cecil Weir. He later trained for ordination at Westcott House, Cambridge, an Anglican theological college, completing it in 1969.

== Career ==
=== Academic career ===
Nicholson began his academic career in 1962 when he returned to his alma mater Trinity College, Dublin as a lecturer in Hebrew and Semitics. In 1967, he moved to the University of Cambridge where he became a university lecturer in Old Testament Studies and a fellow of University College. In 1969, he changed colleges and became a fellow of Pembroke College.

In 1979, he moved to the University of Oxford. He was granted a chair as Professor of the Interpretation of Holy Scripture and became a Fellow of Oriel College. In 1990, he became the 50th Provost of Oriel College; he was installed by the college's Visitor, Queen Elizabeth II. He served as Pro-Vice-Chancellor of the University of Oxford from 1993 to 2003.

He retired from academia in 2003 and was appointed Professor Emeritus of the University of Oxford.

=== Ordained ministry ===
Nicholson had been a choirboy while at school in Northern Ireland. In 1969, he was ordained a deacon in the Church of England at Ely Cathedral. He was ordained a priest the following year. When he joined Pembroke College, Cambridge, he served as a college chaplain and dean of its chapel between 1973 and 1979.

In retirement, Nicholson held Permission to Officiate in the Diocese of Oxford from 2010 until his death in 2013.

== Later life ==
After his retirement in 2003, he remained living in Oxford. In November 2012, he was diagnosed with liver cancer. He died on 22 December 2013 at the age of 75. His funeral was held on 10 January 2014 at St Peter's Church, Wolvercote, Oxford. A memorial service was held on 29 March 2014 at the University Church of St Mary the Virgin in Oxford.

== Personal life ==
In 1962, Nicholson married Hazel Jackson. They had met while at the same school and, after she tutored him in Latin for his university entrance exam, they entered a relationship. Together they had four children; Rosalind, Kathryn, Jane, and Peter. His son predeceased him, having died from an epileptic seizure in 2011.

== Honours ==
In 1987, Nicholson was elected a Fellow of the British Academy (FBA). in 1988 was president of the Society for Old Testament Study. In 1994, he was awarded an Honorary Fellowship by St Peter's College, Oxford. He was awarded the 2009 Burkitt Medal for Biblical Studies by the British Academy. In 2010, he was elected Member of the Royal Irish Academy (MRIA).

He was appointed Commander of the Order of Merit of the Italian Republic.

== Works ==
- Deuteronomy and Tradition (1969)
- Preaching to the Exiles (1971)
- Exodus and Sinai in History and Tradition (1973)
- God and His People: Covenant and Theology in the Old Testament (1986)
- The Pentateuch in the 20th century: the legacy of Julius Wellhausen (1998)
- A Century of Theological and Religious Studies in Britain, 1902–2002 (2003), editor
- Deuteronomy and the Judaean Diaspora (2014)

Academic offices
Preceded by James Barr	Oriel and Laing Professor of the Interpretation of Holy Scripture, University of Oxford; 1979–1990	Succeeded by John Barton
Preceded by Zelman Cowen	Provost of Oriel College, Oxford; 1990–2003	Succeeded by Derek Morris
