= Edward Cadbury Professor of Theology =

Edward Cadbury Professor of Theology is a senior chair in theology at the University of Birmingham. It was founded in 1940 and was named for Edward Cadbury who helped fund the setting up of the university's theological department. The chair has been held by people from a number of Christian denominations.

== List of incumbents ==
- H. G. Wood (1940 to 1946); 1st Edward Cadbury Professor
- Hedley Sparks (1946 to 1952)
- Geoffrey Hugo Lampe (1953 to 1960)
- John Gordon Davies (1960 to 1986); 4th Edward Cadbury Professor
- Frances Young (1986 to 2005)
- David C Parker (2005 to 2017)
- Candida Moss (2017-)
