= Haviva Ner-David =

Israeli feminist activist and Open Orthodox rabbi

- חביבה נר-דוד
- Born: Haviva Krasner-Davidson
- Education: Columbia University (BA); Bar Ilan University (PhD)
- Occupations: Rabbi, activist

Haviva Ner-David (Hebrew: חביבה נר-דוד; formerly Haviva Krasner-Davidson) is an Israeli feminist activist and Open Orthodox rabbi.

== Biography ==
Ner-David received her BA degree from Columbia University and her PhD from Bar Ilan University, and wrote her thesis concerning the nature of the relationship between tumah (ritual impurity) and niddah (a menstruant woman). In 1993 she applied to Yeshiva University’s rabbinical program, RIETS and never received an official response. Despite this early rejection, she went on to become one of the first women known to have controversially been granted the equivalent of Orthodox Semicha (rabbinic ordination), which she received from Rabbi Dr. Aryeh Strikovsky of Tel-Aviv in 2006. In 2000 she wrote a book documenting her journey and aspirations as a female rabbi entitled, Life on the Fringes: A Feminist Journey Toward Traditional Rabbinic Ordination. She subsequently left Orthodoxy and now identifies as a “post-denominational rabbi.” She advocates non-Orthodox practices such as egalitarian tefilah and unmarried women practicing mikveh before engaging in pre-marital sex.

She is the founding director of Reut: The Center for Modern Jewish Marriage, a marriage center in Jerusalem that helps couples plan a more woman-friendly ceremony and ketubah, and provides legal and financial advice, couples counseling, and a mikveh open to couples. Ner-David is currently the Director of "Shmaya": A Ritual and Educational Mikveh, and the founding director of Reut: The Center for Modern Jewish Marriage. She has also written Chanah’s Voice: A Rabbi Wrestles with Gender, Commandment, and the Women's Rituals of Baking, Bathing, and Brightening (2013, Ben Yehudah Press). She lives on Kibbutz Hannaton in northern Israel with her husband and seven children.

Ner-David was among the few Open Orthodox women rabbis to have received private ordination in the Orthodox Jewish context before the institutional change that resulted in the founding of Yeshivat Maharat. Other women in her position include Mimi Feigelson (ordained in 1994) and Dina Najman (ordained in 2006).

== Books ==
- Ner-David, Haviva (2013). Chanah's Voice: A Rabbi Wrestles with Gender, Commandment, and the Women's Rituals of Baking, Bathing, and Brightening. Ben Yehuda Press. ISBN 978-1934730447.
- Ner-David, Haviva (2014). Life on the Fringes: A Feminist Journey Toward Traditional Rabbinic Ordination. Ben Yehuda Press. ISBN 978-1934730430.
- Ner-David, Haviva (2021). Hope Valley: a novel. Bedazzled Ink Publishing Company. ISBN 978-1949290592.
- Ner-David, Haviva (2021). Dreaming Against the Current: a Rabbi's Soul Journey. Bedazzled Ink Publishing Company. ISBN 978-1949290752.
- Ner-David, Haviva; Spilker, Rachel Stock (2023). Yonah and the Mikveh Fish. illustrated by Meira Ner-David. Bedazzled Ink Publishing Company. ISBN 978-1960373205.
- Ner-David, Haviva (2023). To Die in Secret: a novel. Bedazzled Ink Publishing Company. ISBN 978-1960373090.

== See also ==
- Dina Brawer
- Shira Marili Mirvis
- Gender and Judaism
- Jewish feminism
- Jewish view of marriage
