= Falconer Madan =

British librarian, librarian of the Bodlian Library

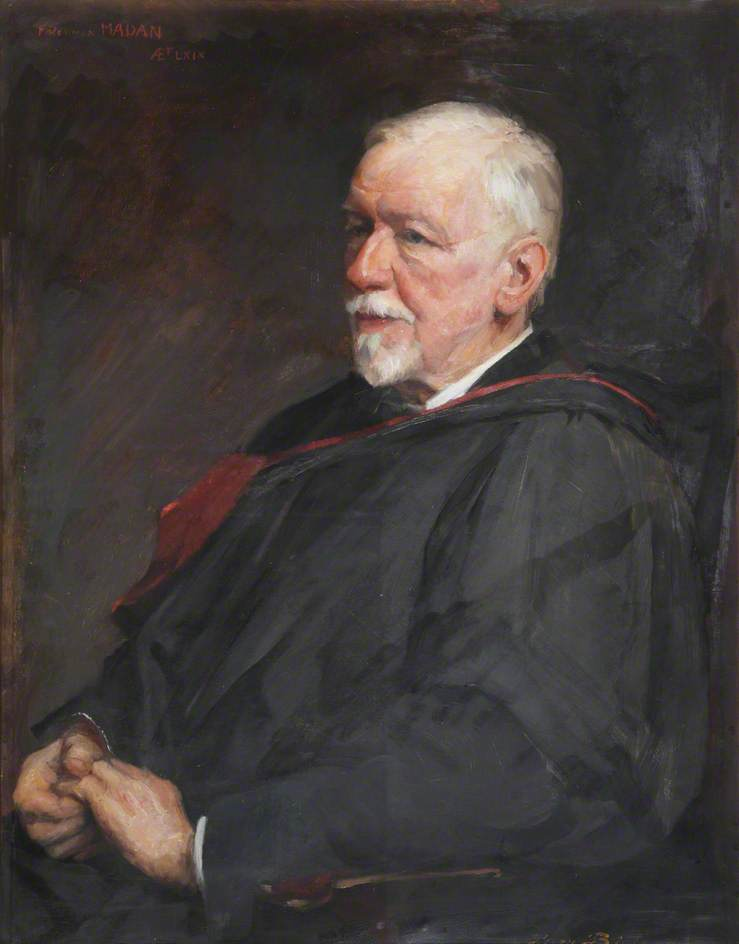
Falconer Madan

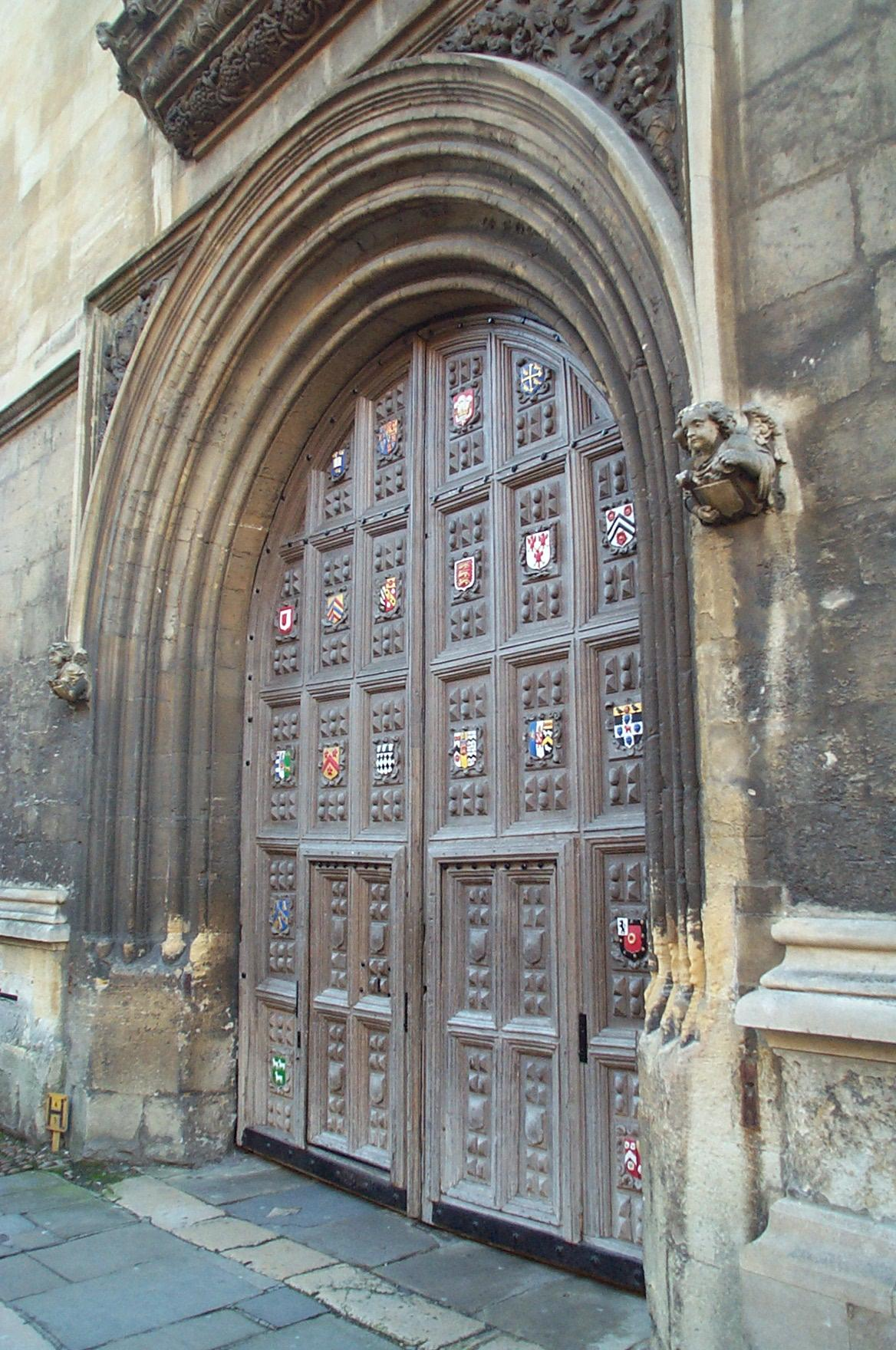
Entrance to the Bodleian Library

Falconer Madan (15 April 1851 – 22 May 1935) was Librarian of the Bodleian Library of Oxford University.

== Early life and education ==
Falconer Madan was born in Cam, Gloucestershire, the fifth son of George and Harriet Madan. He was educated at Marlborough College and Brasenose College, Oxford, where he took part in Oxford and Cambridge chess matches in 1873 and 1874, and won the University Singles fives prize in 1874.

== Career ==
Madan was a fellow of Brasenose from 1875 until 1880, when he was appointed sub-librarian of the Bodleian Library. In 1890, he was given the task of the creating a summary catalogue of the manuscripts of the Bodleian beginning with those not included in the catalogue of 1697. The completion of the Summary Catalogue is the chief monument of his work. In 1889, Madan became a Fellow again and lecturer in palaeography until 1913. Another significant publication of this period is his The Early Oxford Press: a bibliography of printing and publishing at Oxford, 1468–1640 (Oxford: Clarendon Press, 1895).

In 1909 Madan gave the Sandars Lectures on bibliography at Cambridge, choosing as his topic the localisation and dating of manuscripts.

In 1912, Madan became Librarian of the Bodleian. During this time, a new underground book-store under Radcliffe Square was opened, the library records were put into systematic arrangement, and the Bodleian Quarterly Record, a periodical of more than local interest, was started. He resigned the librarianship in 1919.

He was president of the Library Association in 1914 and 1915, President of the Bibliographical Society from 1919 to 1921, and President of the Oxford Bibliographic Society in 1924 and 1925. He published many library-related works. In 1932, he received the Gold Medal of the Bibliographical Society.

Madan helped Sidney Herbert Williams revise his A Bibliography of Lewis Carroll (London: The Bookman's Journal, 1924), the first such, into A Handbook of the Literature of the Rev. C. L. Dodgson (Lewis Carroll) (London: Oxford University Press, 1931), receiving co-author credit, and published a supplement thereto in 1935. He also edited The Lewis Carroll Centenary in London (London: J. & E. Bumpus, 1932), a catalogue of the exhibition.

== Personal life ==
Falconer Madan married Frances Jane Hayter (1862–1938) second daughter of Harrison Hayter the engineer. His son, Geoffrey, was a celebrated anthologist. His daughter Ethel married Charles Fox Burney, and his granddaughter Venetia Burney is noteworthy for proposing the name Pluto for the newly discovered planet. Another son, Francis Falconer Madan (1886-1961), was a bibliographer and art collector, who gave works to the British Museum and left a large bequest of paintings to the Ashmolean Museum, Oxford.

== Publications ==
- Oxford Books: a bibliography of printed works relating to the university and city of Oxford or printed or published there (1895-1931)

- v.1 The Early Oxford Press, 1468–1640
- v.2 Oxford Literature, 1450–1640, and 1641–1650
- v.3 Oxford Literature, 1651–1680

- Books in Manuscript (1893)
- The Gresleys of Drakelowe (1899)
- A Brief Account of the University Press at Oxford (1908)
- History of the Madan Family
- The Daniel Press: memorials of C. H. O. Daniel, with a bibliography of the Press 1845–1919. (Oxford: Printed on the Daniel Press in the Bodleian Library, 1922. Reprinted: Folkestone: Dawsons, 1974. Addenda and corrigenda, 1922.)
- Oxford Outside the Guide-Books (1923)
- A Handbook of the Literature of the Rev. C. L. Dodgson (Lewis Carroll) (1931)
- The Lewis Carroll Centenary in London (1932)
