= James Barr (biblical scholar) =

Scottish biblical scholar (1924–2006)

The Reverend James Barr FBA
- Born: 20 March 1924; Glasgow, Scotland
- Died: 14 October 2006 (aged 82); Claremont, California, US
- Title: Oriel Professor of the Interpretation of Holy Scripture (1976–1978); Regius Professor of Hebrew, University of Oxford (1978–1989)
- Spouse: Jane Hepburn Barr (m. 1950)

Ecclesiastical career
- Church: Church of Scotland
- Ordained: 1951

Academic background
- Education: University of Edinburgh
- Influences: Ferdinand de Saussure

Academic work
- Discipline: Biblical studies
- Sub-discipline: Old Testament studies
- Institutions: Presbyterian College, Montreal; University of Edinburgh; Princeton Theological Seminary; Victoria University of Manchester; Oriel College, Oxford; Christ Church, Oxford; Vanderbilt University
- Doctoral students: Athalya Brenner
- Notable works: The Semantics of Biblical Language (1961)
- Influenced: Moisés Silva

James Barr FBA (20 March 1924 – 14 October 2006) was a Scottish Old Testament scholar, known for his critique of the notion that the vocabulary and structure of the Hebrew language may reflect a particular theological mindset. At the University of Oxford, he was the Oriel Professor of the Interpretation of Holy Scripture from 1976 to 1978, and the Regius Professor of Hebrew from 1978 to 1989.

== Biography ==
Born in Glasgow, Scotland (although one obituary claims he was born in Edinburgh), educated at Daniel Stewart's college in Edinburgh and the University of Edinburgh, Barr was ordained to the ministry of the Church of Scotland in 1951. He held professorships in New College in the University of Edinburgh, University of Manchester, in Princeton Theological Seminary and at Vanderbilt University in the United States. He was Oriel Professor of the Interpretation of Holy Scripture at Oxford from 1976 to 1978 and Regius Professor of Hebrew from 1978 to 1989.

Following service in World War II in the Fleet Air Arm of the Royal Navy where he was a pilot of torpedo bombers and took part in air-sea rescue missions, he studied at Edinburgh University, obtaining a first-class honours degree (Scottish MA) in Classics (1948) and the BD with Distinction in Old Testament (1951). After ordination (1951) and service as minister in the Church of Scotland in Tiberias, Israel (1951–53), during which time he acquired fluency in modern Hebrew and Arabic, he was appointed Professor of New Testament in the Presbyterian College, Montreal (1953–55). Then he was appointed Professor of Old Testament Language, Literature & Theology in Edinburgh University (New College, 1955–61). He then moved to the US as Professor of Old Testament in Princeton Theological Seminary (1961–65), followed by appointments in the University of Manchester (1965–76) as Professor Semitic Languages and Literatures, and in Oxford University, initially as Oriel Professor of the Interpretation of Holy Scripture (1976–78) and then as Regius Professor of Hebrew (1978–89). After his retirement from Oxford, he was appointed Professor of Hebrew Bible in Vanderbilt University (1989–98).

Barr received many honours. He served as president of the Society for Old Testament Study (1973) and of the British Association for Jewish Studies (1978), and was elected a Fellow of the American Academy of Arts and Sciences and a member of the American Philosophical Society in 1993. He was a member of the Norwegian Academy of Science and Letters from 1977.

== Biblical scholarship and theology ==
His The Semantics of Biblical Language (1961) was very influential. In the book, he criticised scholars' reliance on linguistically flawed arguments, such as arguments from etymology or based upon misconceptions about the relation between Hebrew thought and language. Much of Barr's critique was built upon the work of French linguist Ferdinand de Saussure. In turn, Barr's student Moisés Silva built on Barr's work in Biblical Words and Their Meaning (1983). In another important study, Comparative Philology and the Text of the Old Testament (1968), the Scottish scholar criticised the tendency to ascribe meanings to difficult Hebrew words based on words in other Semitic languages (e.g., Ugaritic). This study has been described as having "put comparative Semitic philology on a new and firmer footing." He edited Journal of Semitic Studies 1965–1976, and served as editor of the Oxford Hebrew Dictionary project.

He was also an outspoken critic of conservative evangelicalism, which he attacked in his 1977 book Fundamentalism. In particular he criticised evangelical scholars such as J. I. Packer for affirming the doctrine of scriptural inerrancy, the teaching that the Bible is without error. Barr's other works about fundamentalism include The Scope and Authority of the Bible (1980) and Escaping Fundamentalism (1984). He was often invited to appear in BBC religious programming.

== Personal life ==
Barr married Jane Hepburn in 1950 and had two sons and a daughter. He was the grandson of the minister and politician James Barr. He died in Claremont, California, on 14 October 2006, aged 82.

== Selected works ==
- 1961: The Semantics of Biblical Language
- 1968: Comparative Philology and the Text of the Old Testament
- 1973: The Bible in the Modern World
- 1977: Fundamentalism
- 1980: The Scope and Authority of the Bible
- 1984: Escaping from Fundamentalism (titled Beyond Fundamentalism in the United States)
- 1989: The Variable Spellings of the Hebrew Bible (Schweich Lectures for 1986) Oxford: for the British Academy by the Oxford University Press ISBN 0-19-726068-3
- 1992: Biblical Faith and Natural Theology (Gifford Lectures for 1990–91) Oxford: Clarendon Press ISBN 0-19-826205-1; online
- 1999: The Concept of Biblical Theology: an Old Testament perspective
- 2004: the article "Of Metaphysics and Polynesian Navigation" in the anthology Seeing God Everywhere (World Wisdom)
- 2005: History and Ideology in the Old Testament: biblical studies at the end of a millennium
- 2013: Bible and Interpretation: The Collected Essays of James Barr, Volumes I-III. Oxford University Press, ISBN 9780198261926

Academic offices
Preceded by Hedley Sparks	Oriel Professor of the Interpretation of Holy Scripture; 1976–1978	Succeeded by Ernest Nicholson
Preceded by William McHardy	Regius Professor of Hebrew at the University of Oxford; 1978–1989	Succeeded by Hugh G. M. Williamson
Professional and academic associations
Preceded by Peter Ackroyd	President of the Society for Old Testament Study; 1973	Succeeded by D. R. Ap-Thomas
