= Professor of Hebrew and Semitic Languages =

The Professor of Hebrew and Semitic Languages is a position at the University of Glasgow in Scotland. It was established in 1709 by Queen Anne as the Chair of Oriental Languages. The title was changed in 1893.

== Professors of Oriental Languages/Professors of Hebrew and Semitic Languages ==
- Charles Morthland MA (1709)
- Alexander Dublop MA LLD (1745)
- William Rouet MA (1751)
- George Muirhead MA (1753)
- John Anderson MA (1755)
- James Buchanan MA (1757)
- Patick Cumin MA LLD (1761)
- Robert Trail MA DD (1761)
- Gavin Gibb MA LLD (1820)
- William Fleming MA DD (1831)
- George Gray DD (1839)
- Duncan Harkness Weir MA DD (1850)
- James Robertson MA DD (1877)
- William Barron Stevenson MA DLitt LLD DD (1907)
- Cecil James Mullo Weir MA DPhil DD (1937)
- John McDonald MA BD PhD STM (1968–1987)

== See also ==
- List of Professorships at the University of Glasgow
