= Dina Najman =

American rabbi

Rabbi
- In office 2014–present
- Title: Rabbi of The Kehilah of Riverdale

Personal life
- Notable work(s): Leadership at Kehilat Orach Eliezer, Kehilah of Riverdale
- Education: Michlalah-Jerusalem College, Stern College for Women, Drisha Institute, Nishmat
- Known for: First Orthodox woman appointed as rabbinic leader of a synagogue
- Relatives: Hindy Najman (sibling)

Religious life
- Religion: Judaism
- Denomination: Orthodox Judaism
- Profession: Rabbi, Bioethicist

Dina Najman (b.21 July 1968 (age 58)) is the rabbi of the Kehilah of Riverdale, a synagogue in Bronx, New York City, founded in 2014, which describes itself as "an Orthodox Jewish Congregation dedicated to creating a serious and meaningful tefilah for our kehilah, committed to learning Torah and living by its values and seeking to promote individual and communal acts of chesed (kindness)" and as "supporting spiritual and lay leadership irrespective of gender."

== Career ==
Najman's father Chaim was a cantor, who served in Omaha and, starting in 1979, at Congregation Shaarey Zedek (Michigan). Her mother Sherry Najman was a teacher in the Detroit public schools. Her siblings include Hindy Najman, a Jewish studies scholar.

In 2006, Najman became the first Orthodox woman appointed as rabbinic leader of a synagogue, when she became the Rosh Kehilah (lit. community leader) of Kehilat Orach Eliezer in Manhattan, New York. Though not officially affiliated, the synagogue served in effect as Modern Orthodox At that time, Najman insisted on a gender-neutral title. She was educated at Michlalah-Jerusalem College, Stern College for Women, Drisha Institute, and Nishmat (midrasha), where she served as a "shoel u’meishiv" — someone to whom students can turn for help in their learning.

She is a bioethicist certified by the Bioethics and Medical Humanities program run jointly by New York University and Albert Einstein College of Medicine. Due to her mastery of the arcana of the field, she remains in demand as a lecturer on bioethics and Jewish law for communities all over the world. Najman was ordained by Rabbi Daniel Sperber and has been a Senior Rabbinic Fellow at Shalom Hartman Institute. She is also the head of the Gemara department at the SAR Academy. Phyllis Chesler said of Najman, "She's a rebbe, a Talmudist, the way she gets right to the point in so few words."

Dina Najman was among the few Orthodox women rabbis to have received private ordination in the Orthodox Jewish context before the institutional change that resulted in the founding of Yeshivat Maharat. Other women in her position include Mimi Feigelson (ordained in 1994) and Haviva Ner-David (ordained in 2006).

== See also ==
- Dina Brawer
- Shira Marili Mirvis
