= Mimi Feigelson =

American Orthodox Jewish rabbi and educator

- Born: 7 March 1963 (age 63); New York, U.S.
- Education: Hebrew University (BA), (MA); Hebrew Union College-Jewish Institute of Religion (PhD)
- Occupations: Rabbi and educator
- Website: schechter.edu/staff/rabbi-dr-reb-mimi-feigelson/

Mimi Feigelson is an Orthodox Jewish rabbi, scholar, educator and spiritual leader.

== Early life and education ==
Born in New York on March 7, 1963, she moved to Israel at age eight and began studying with Rabbi Shlomo Carlebach at age sixteen. In 1985 she completed a BA degree in history at Hebrew University of Jerusalem. She says that in 1994, Carlebach granted her religious ordination (smicha), normally reserved for men. Her ordination as well as that of Eveline Goodman-Thau was revealed in 2000 in an article by the New York Jewish Week. Feigelson is also described as being ordained in 1996 by a panel of three rabbis after Carlebach's death. She earned a masters degree in Jewish philosophy at Hebrew University in 2000. Upon completion of her studies she had expertise not only in Torah but also Chasidic literature and thought with a desire to teach all who wanted to learn. In 2016 she earned her doctorate from Hebrew Union College – Jewish Institute of Religion. Her doctoral dissertation explores Jewish funeral rituals and how individuals can reclaim their funerals as the final chapter of life, rather than the first chapter of death.

== Rabbinic career ==
In 2001 she left her role as associate director and head of the women's beit midrash at Yakar in Jerusalem, an Orthodox synagogue she helped found in 1992, and moved to Los Angeles to teach in the Ziegler School of Rabbinic Studies at University of Judaism where she was the students' mashpiah ruchanit, or spiritual guide. She taught at the school until 2017, when she moved back to Israel to take a similar position at the Schechter Rabbinical Seminary in Jerusalem. She uses the title "Reb" rather than "Rabbi" and is universally known as "Reb Mimi".

Feigelson was among the few Orthodox women rabbis to have received private ordination in the Orthodox Jewish context before the institutional change that resulted in the founding of Yeshivat Maharat. Other women in her position include Haviva Ner-David and Dina Najman (both ordained in 2006). In 2010 she was recognized as one of the fifty most influential female Rabbis in the U.S by The Forward.

== See also ==
- Sara Hurwitz
- Dina Brawer
