= David Capell Simpson =

David Capell Simpson (22 May 1883 – 6 May 1955), known as D. C. Simpson, was a British biblical scholar, academic and Church of England clergyman. He was Oriel Professor of the Interpretation of Holy Scripture at the University of Oxford from 1925 to 1950.

Among his principal writings was Pentateuchal Criticism (Oxford University Press, 1914), which was written while he was tutor of Keble College, Oxford and examining chaplain to the Bishop of Southwell.

In 1926 he edited The Psalmists : Essays on Their Religious Experience and Teaching, Their Social Background, and Their Place in the Development of Hebrew Psalmody (Oxford University Press), which contained essays by Hugo Gressmann, H. Wheeler Robinson, T. H. Robinson, Godfrey Rolles Driver, and Aylward M. Blackman.

He was president of the Society for Old Testament Study in 1927 and edited the proceedings of the Society's annual conference for the year: Old Testament essays : Papers read before the SOTS at its 18th meeting, at Keble College, Oxford, September 27th to 30th, 1927 (London: Charles Griffin and Company, 1927).

His articles in academic journals included "The Chief Recensions of the Book of Tobit", Journal of Theological Studies, old series 14 (1913), pp. 516–30, "Messianic Prophecy and the Jewish Problem," Church Quarterly Review 88 (1919), pp. 109–22, and "The Hebrew Book of Proverbs and the Teaching of Amenophis", The Journal of Egyptian Archaeology 12 (1926), pp. 232–9.

He is not to be confused with Cuthbert Aikman Simpson, also an Old Testament scholar, who was Regius Professor of Hebrew in the University of Oxford from 1954 to 1959.

Academic offices
Preceded by Charles Fox Burney	Oriel Professor of the Interpretation of Holy Scripture, University of Oxford; 1925–1950	Succeeded by Hedley Sparks
