= Geoffrey Hugo Lampe =

British theologian & Anglican priest (1912–1980)

Geoffrey William Hugo Lampe MC FBA (13 August 1912 – 5 August 1980) was a British theologian and Anglican priest who dedicated his life to theological teaching and research. He was Edward Cadbury Professor of Theology at the University of Birmingham from 1953 to 1960. He then moved to the University of Cambridge where he was Ely Professor of Divinity from 1960 to 1970 and Regius Professor of Divinity from 1970 until his retirement in 1979. He was also a member of the General Synod of the Church of England.

Lampe was educated at Blundells School between 1926 and 1931, from where he won a scholarship to Exeter College, Oxford. He obtained second-class honours in Classical Moderations in 1933 followed by first-class honours in Literae Humaniores in 1935 and in theology a year laterref.

Lampe was a chaplain to 34 Armoured Brigade during the second half of World War II, and was awarded the Military Cross for bravery when rescuing wounded troops when under fire.

He was particularly renowned for his dictionary of patristic Greek, i.e. of vocabulary attested in Christian authors from Clement of Rome to Theodore of Studium.

== Bibliography ==
- The Seal of the Spirit, a study in the Doctrine of Baptism and Confirmation in the New Testament and the Fathers (Longmans, Green & Co), 1951.
- A Patristic Greek Lexicon, Oxford (Clarendon Press), 1961.
- The Resurrection. A Dialogue Between Two Cambridge Professors in a Secular Age (Mowbray), 1966.
- The Phenomenon of Christian Belief (Mowbray) 1970.
- The Cambridge History of the Bible: West from the Fathers to the Reformation v. 2 (Cambridge University Press), 1975.
- God as Spirit: The Bampton Lectures 1976: The Bampton Lectures (Clarendon Press), 1977.

Professor Lampe also contributed the commentaries on the Gospel of Luke and the Acts of the Apostles to Peake's Commentary on the Bible (1962).

Academic offices
Preceded by Dennis Nineham	Regius Professor of Divinity at Cambridge; 1971—1979	Succeeded by Henry Chadwick
