= Shimon Cowen =

Australian rabbi and academic

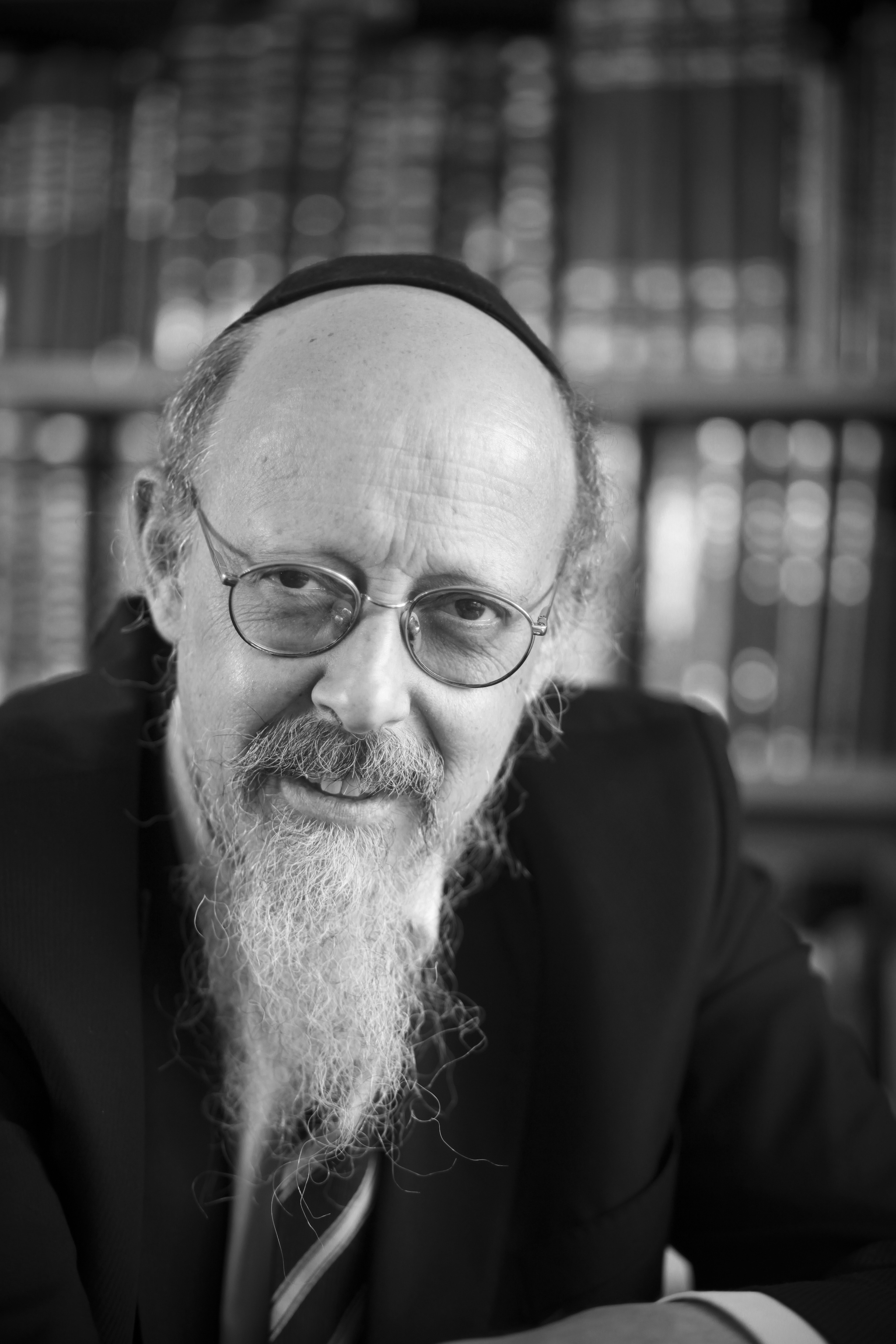
Rabbi Dr Shimon Cowen

Shimon Dovid Cowen (born 7 September 1951) is an Australian rabbi and academic. He is known for his research on, and advocacy for, the Noahide Laws, on the basis of which, he has publicly opposed homosexuality, looser abortion laws and voluntary assisted dying legislation.

He is affiliated with Chabad Hasidism, a branch of ultra-Orthodox Judaism, and is the son of the former Governor General of Australia, Sir Zelman Cowen.

== Education ==
Cowen was born in Melbourne, Victoria, concluding his secondary education in New South Wales before attending the Australian National University in Canberra. His studies took him to LMU Munich and Monash University, from which he received a PhD in social philosophy in 1984.

For a number of years he was a member of the Kollel Menachem Lubavitch, a tertiary Rabbinic Institute, where he became director of community educational programs. He received rabbinic ordination from Rabbis Chaim Gutnick and She’ar Yashuv Cohen He also taught in the Australian Centre for Jewish Civilization at Monash University.

== Institute for Judaism and Civilization ==
In 1998, he founded, and continues to direct, the Institute for Judaism and Civilization. This institute was established to examine the “interface between Judaism and the arts, sciences and values of general society”.

== Universal Ethics ==
In addition to exploring the interface between Judaism and society and culture, Cowen has made a major focus of his work, the study of the universal ethics, at the root of the world religions, which he elaborated upon in his book on the Noahide laws, The Theory and Practice of Universal Ethics – The Noahide Laws. Cowen has opposed Victoria's abortion laws that he claims is too liberal, and claims that these policies will "open the floodgates of barbarism". Victoria in 2017 introduced Australia’s first assisted suicide legislation, in which he saw further evidence of a loss of the moral compass of universal ethics and a new low point of civilization. He has also opposed homosexuality and euthanasia, as contraventions of the Noahide laws.

He claims that these ethics, at the root of the world religions, should inform all of humanity's action and specifically be made known to political leaders and public political discourse.

In the Victorian State election of 2014 he strongly advocated for a vote for one of the conservative minor parties, Family First, DLP or the Australian Christians. He opposed voting for the major parties based on their support for same-sex marriage.

He was also thanked by the DLP member of Victoria's Legislative Council, Rachel Carling-Jenkins during her maiden speech.

== Views on homosexuality ==
As an advocate for the Noahide Laws, Cowen has been vocal on the issue of homosexuality, which is prohibited by the fourth Noahide Law. He has expressed views opposing same-sex marriage, and lamented the Victorian Health Complaints Act which aims to prevent conversion therapy.

In 2010, the Victorian government established the Safe Schools Coalition, which was to be adopted nationally with the goals to create a more inclusive environment for LGBTIQ students and their families. In 2012, Cowen questioned whether the conduct of bullying could be addressed and stopped without aspects of the program concerned with "celebrating" homosexuality or promoting it to minors, which could "harm the normal sexual development of children".

In 2015, Cowen used his Monash University email account to send to a group of municipal councillors a booklet which he described as, “a comprehensive briefing on [same-sex marriage] from the standpoint of the Judaeo-Christian tradition.” Monash University subsequently revoked Cowen's appointment, on the basis of concerns of an "implication that the Institute [for Judaism and Civilization] is associated with Monash". On the grounds that the university’s decision constituted a prima facie violation of the Act of Parliament establishing Monash University, Cowen pursued and then appealed a Freedom-of-Information decision about disclosure of the deliberations of the university leading to the dismissal. The presiding Magistrate found that "While I accept Dr Cowen's submission that freedom of academic expression and freedom to hold and practice religious beliefs in a university setting are important public interests, I reject his submission that the public interest requires that access should be given to the documents in contest in this proceeding."

In 2017, following an event organised by the Jewish Community Council of Victoria titled the 'LGBTI Mental Health Forum', at which Cowen was accused by some of comparing same sex attraction to bestiality and paedophilia, incest and theft, Cowen explained that he did not draw any moral comparisons with homosexual conduct. He clarified that "The meeting discussed the issue of acceptance and inclusion of homosexual persons. I stated my understanding that we accept and care for all Jews – and indeed all people – because they are people, precious and made in the image of God. I went on to explain that one must be willing to exert oneself in this love and acceptance. Here I added extreme examples of misconduct, where the effort to love the person may be a difficult one".

== Publications ==
- Seder bircas hanehenin (English translation of, and commentary on, a classic work of Jewish law by Rabbi Schneur Zalman of Liadi (New York: Kehot, 1997). Second edition with revisions published 2007.
- Jewish Thought in Context - Studies in the relationships of Jewish and secular thought, Melbourne: Monash University (Series: Monographs in Judaism and Civilization), 1998, 2000
- Maimonides' Principles - Dialectics and the structure of Jewish belief, Melbourne: Monash University (Series: Monographs in Judaism and Civilization), 1998, 2000,
- Judaism in the Prism of the Sciences, Melbourne: Monash University (Series: Monographs in Judaism and Civilization), 2001
- The Rediscovery of the Human – Basic Texts of Viktor E. Frankl, Melbourne and Philadelphia: Institute for Judaism and Civilization, 2004. Revised and expanded second edition 2014.
- Politics and Universal Ethics, Ballan: Connor Court Publishing, 2011
- There is more than this... Lectures for Campion College, Melbourne: Institute for Judaism and Civilization, 2015.
- The Theory and Practice of Universal Ethics – the Noahide Laws, New York: Institute for Judaism and Civilization (printed by Kehot Publication Society), 2015
- Homosexuality, Marriage and Society, Redland Bay: Connor Court, 2016
- Aesthetics and the Divine, Melbourne: Hybrid Publishers, 2017
- The Human Being in the Image of the Divine – The Psychology of Viktor E. Frankl, Melbourne: Institute for Judaism and Civilization, 2017
- The Theory of Knowledge – Perspectives from Sinai, Melbourne: Institute for Judaism and Civilization, 2017
- Torah and the Natural Sciences, Melbourne: Institute for Judaism and Civilization, 2018
