= Zelman Cowen =

Governor-General of Australia from 1977 to 1982

The Right Honourable Sir Zelman Cowen AK GCMG GCVO PC QC FTSE
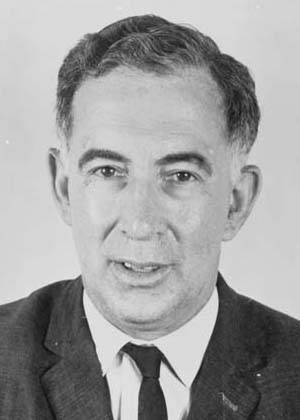
- Cowen in 1968

19th Governor-General of Australia
- In office 8 December 1977 – 29 July 1982
- Monarch: Elizabeth II
- Prime Minister: Malcolm Fraser
- Preceded by: Sir John Kerr
- Succeeded by: Sir Ninian Stephen

Provost of Oriel College, Oxford
- In office 1982–1990
- Preceded by: The Lord Swann
- Succeeded by: Ernest Nicholson

Vice Chancellor of the University of Queensland
- In office 1970–1977
- Preceded by: Sir Fred Schonell
- Succeeded by: Brian Wilson

Vice Chancellor of the University of New England
- In office 1966–1970
- Preceded by: Sir Robert Madgwick
- Succeeded by: Alec Lazenby

Personal details
- Born: 7 October 1919 Melbourne, Australia
- Died: 8 December 2011 (aged 92) Toorak, Victoria, Australia
- Spouse: Anna Wittner (m. 1945)
- Children: 4
- Profession: Legal professor

Sir Zelman Cowen (né Cohen; 7 October 1919 – 8 December 2011) was an Australian legal scholar and university administrator who served as the 19th governor-general of Australia, in office from 1977 to 1982.

Cowen was born in Melbourne, and attended Scotch College before going on to the University of Melbourne where he was resident at Ormond College. His studies were interrupted by World War II, during which he served in the Royal Australian Navy. After the war's end, Cowen attended New College, Oxford, on a Rhodes Scholarship. He subsequently won the prestigious Vinerian Scholarship as the best student in the Bachelor of Civil Law degree. He remained at Oxford after graduating, serving as a fellow of Oriel College from 1947 to 1950.

In 1951, Cowen returned to Australia to become dean of the law faculty at the University of Melbourne. In 1953, still while at the University of Melbourne, he was awarded a Fulbright Senior Scholarship in Law to Harvard University. He became known as an expert on constitutional law, and was a visiting professor at a number of overseas institutions. He later served as vice-chancellor of the University of New England (1966–1970) and the University of Queensland (1970–1977). In 1977, Malcolm Fraser appointed Cowen to succeed John Kerr as governor-general. He was an uncontroversial choice, and became the second Jewish holder of the position, after Sir Isaac Isaacs. After leaving office, Cowen returned to academia, serving as provost of Oriel College, Oxford, from 1982 to 1990.

== Early life ==
Cowen was born in Melbourne in 1919. His paternal grandparents were Jewish immigrants from Belarus in the Russian Empire. The name was formally changed to Cowen when he was a young boy. He was educated at St Kilda Park State School, Scotch College and the University of Melbourne. He served in the Royal Australian Navy during the Second World War, and was in Darwin during the bombing raid of 1942, before being transferred to Brisbane to work in the cipher unit of General MacArthur's office. He married Anna Wittner in 1945. Cowen then went as a Rhodes Scholar to New College, Oxford, where he completed a Bachelor of Civil Law degree and jointly won the Vinerian Scholarship. From 1947 to 1950 he was a fellow of Oriel College, Oxford, and was also a consultant on legal matters to the British Military Government in Allied-occupied Germany.

Zelman Cowen was a 1953 Fulbright Senior Scholar in Law from the University of Melbourne to Harvard University.

== Educational career ==
In 1951 Cowen returned to Australia and became dean of the law faculty at the University of Melbourne, a post he held until 1966 where he appointed, and worked with Francis Patrick Donovan. During these years he was frequently a visiting professor at American universities, including the University of Chicago, the University of Illinois and the University of Washington. He also advised the British Colonial Office on constitutional matters and advised the governments of Ghana and Hong Kong on legal issues. Among many other works, he published a biography of Sir Isaac Isaacs, the first Australian-born and first Jewish Governor-General of Australia.

Cowen was appointed Vice-Chancellor of the University of New England in Armidale, New South Wales, in 1966. The following year, he produced for ABC television the "Yes" case for the Australian referendum, 1967 (Aboriginals). From 1970 to 1977 he was Vice-Chancellor of the University of Queensland in Brisbane, during the difficult years of the Vietnam War and Springbok tour student protests. In 1977 Ray Crooke painted Portrait of Professor Emeritus Sir Zelman Cowen which is part of the University of Queensland collection. By this time he was regarded as one of the leading constitutional lawyers in the English-speaking world. He was Emeritus Professor of Law at Melbourne and the Tagore Professor of Law at the University of Calcutta. During his time in Queensland he handled disturbances at the university, resulting from protests against the Vietnam War, with diplomatic skill.

== Governor-General ==
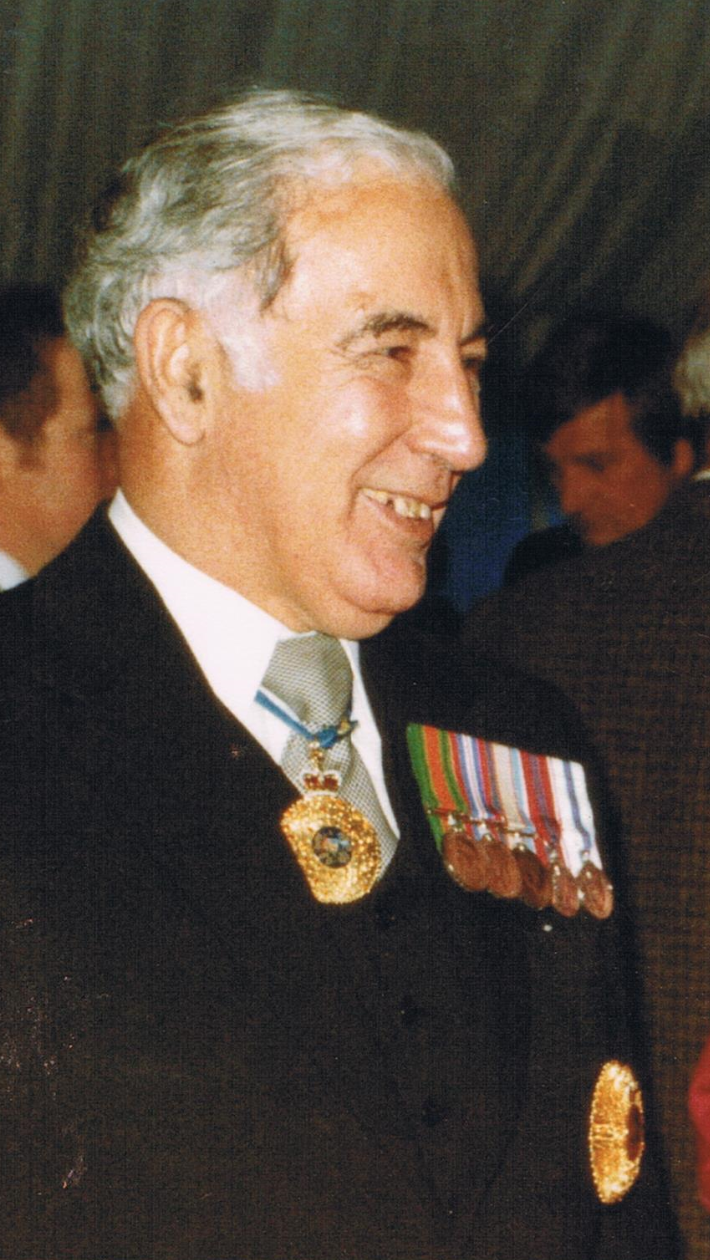
Sir Zelman Cowen in July 1979

When Sir John Kerr's turbulent period of office as Governor-General ended with his early resignation in 1977, the Prime Minister, Malcolm Fraser, offered Cowen the post. He was in some ways a perfect choice. He was a distinguished Australian with an international reputation, his knowledge of the Constitution and the law were beyond dispute, and his political views were unknown. The fact that Cowen was Jewish gave his appointment a multicultural aspect in keeping with contemporary Australian sentiment. He served four and a half years as Governor-General, from December 1977 to July 1982.

== Post vice-regal career ==
From 1982 to 1990 Cowen was Provost of Oriel College, Oxford. After his retirement he returned to Australia and became active in Jewish community affairs in Melbourne. He also pursued a range of other interests, including serving for five years on the board of Fairfax Newspapers (three of them as Chairman) during a turbulent period for the company; and being patron of St Kilda Football Club. During the lead-up to the 1999 Australian republic referendum, he supported a moderate republican position.

== Personal life ==
On 7 June 1945, Cowen married Anna Wittner (5 July 1925 – 10 June 2022) and had four children, Shimon, Yosef, Kate and Ben. His son, Rabbi Shimon Cowen, is Director of the Institute for Judaism and Civilization in Melbourne.

== Death ==
Cowen suffered from Parkinson's disease for at least the last 15 years of his life. He died on 8 December 2011, at the age of 92, at his home in Toorak, Victoria. It was the 34th anniversary of his swearing-in as Governor-General in 1977.

His state funeral at Melbourne's Temple Beth Israel in St Kilda was attended by the Governor-General, Dame Quentin Bryce, the Prime Minister, Julia Gillard, the Opposition Leader, Tony Abbott, and former Prime Ministers Malcolm Fraser, Bob Hawke and John Howard.

== Oral history ==
Cowen was interviewed in 2004 by Mark Finnane. The recording can be found at the National Library of Australia.

== Honours ==
Cowen's first honour was a Knight Bachelor in 1976. When appointed Governor-General he was made a Knight Grand Cross of the Order of St Michael and St George (GCMG) and Knight of the Order of Australia (AK) in 1977, and sworn into the Privy Council in 1977 (Rt Hon). When Queen Elizabeth II visited Australia in 1980 she appointed Cowen a Knight Grand Cross of the Royal Victorian Order (GCVO).

He was an Honorary Fellow of the Australian Academy of Technological Sciences and Engineering (FTSE).

In 1985, he was made an honorary fellow of Trinity College Dublin.

== Named Awards ==
In 1981, the Royal Australian Institute of Architects (RAIA) established the Sir Zelman Cowen Award for Public Architecture which is widely recognised as Australia's leading award for public buildings.

Melbourne Law School awards the Zelman Cowen Scholarship to incoming Juris Doctor students. Awarded purely on the basis of academic merit, it is the law school's most prestigious scholarship. A special issue of the "Melbourne University Law Review" in 2015 published papers from a 2014 conference on legal, international, liberty, literary, university, and other public issues of significance in Cowen's life and work; contributors included Glyn Davis, Justice Susan Kenny, Michael Crommelin, Donald Markwell, Cheryl Saunders, and Sir Frank Berman.

== Bibliography ==
- "Rabbi Jacob Danglow". Biography. Quadrant. 40 (1–2 [323]): 72–76. January–February 1996.
- A public life. Melbourne: Miegunyah Press. 2006.

== Sources ==
- Speech about Cowen's life
- Profile of Zelman Cowen

Government offices
Preceded by Sir John Kerr	Governor-General of Australia; 1977–1982	Succeeded by Sir Ninian Stephen
Academic offices
Preceded by Michael Swann	Provost of Oriel College, Oxford; 1982 to 1990	Succeeded by The Rev Ernest Nicholson
Media offices
Preceded by Patrick Neill	Chairman of the Press Council; 1983–1988	Succeeded by Louis Blom-Cooper
