= Cecil Weir =

Scottish academic and theologian (1897–1995)

- Born: 4 December 1897; Edinburgh, Scotland
- Died: 4 March 1995 (aged 97)

Academic background
- Education: Jesus College, Oxford

Academic work
- Discipline: theology
- Institutions: University of Glasgow
- Notable works: A Lexicon of Accadian Prayers in the Rituals of Expiation

Cecil James Mullo Weir (4 December 1897 – 4 March 1995) was a Scottish academic and theologian, who was Professor of Hebrew and Semitic Languages at the University of Glasgow from 1937 until 1968.

== Life ==
Weir was born in Edinburgh, Scotland, on 4 December 1897. He was educated at the Royal High School, Edinburgh, with his university studies at the University of Edinburgh being interrupted by service with the British Expeditionary Force in the First World War between 1917 and 1919 in France, Belgium and in Germany. After the war, he returned to university and was awarded a first-class Master of Arts degree in classics, 1923. He obtained a further first-class degree in Semitic Languages in 1925. After obtaining a Bachelor of Divinity degree in 1926 from Edinburgh, he moved to Jesus College, Oxford, obtaining his doctorate in 1930. As well as Edinburgh and Oxford, he also studied at the universities of Marburg, Paris and Leipzig.

He began his academic career teaching Hebrew at Edinburgh University. After a period as minister of Orwell in Kinross-shire between 1932 and 1934, Weir moved to the University of Liverpool as Rankin Lecturer and head of the department of Hebrew and Ancient Semitic Languages. He was also a lecturer in the Institute of Archaeology, Liverpool. In 1937, he was appointed Professor of Hebrew and Semitic Languages at the University of Glasgow, a post he held until 1968. He also served as Dean of the Faculty of Divinity from 1951 to 1954 and President of the Glasgow Archaeological Society from 1945 to 1948. He was awarded an honorary Doctorate of Divinity by the University of Edinburgh in 1959.

He died on 4 March 1995.

== Works ==
Weir's publications included A Lexicon of Accadian Prayers in the Rituals of Expiation (1934). He also contributed to works such as A Companion to the Bible (1939), Documents from Old Testament Times (1958) and Archæology and Old Testament Study (1967). He was also editor of the Transactions of Glasgow University Oriental Society, Studia Semitica et Orientalia and the Transactions of Glasgow Archæological Society, and wrote various articles and book reviews.
