= Hindy Najman =

American academic

- Born: April 26, 1967 (age 59)
- Title: Oriel and Laing Professor of the Interpretation of Holy Scripture
- Spouse: Paul W. Franks
- Children: 2

Academic background
- Education: Stern College for Women (BA); Harvard University (MA, PhD)
- Thesis: Authoritative Writing and Interpretation: A Study in the History of Scripture (1998)
- Doctoral advisor: James Kugel

Academic work
- Discipline: Biblical studies
- Sub-discipline: Old Testament; Jewish studies; Study of religions
- Institutions: University of Notre Dame; University of Toronto; Yale University; Oriel College, Oxford

Hindy Najman (born April 26, 1967) is an American academic specialising in Jewish studies and the Hebrew Bible. Since July 2015, she has been Oriel and Laing Professor of the Interpretation of Holy Scripture at the University of Oxford. Previously, she was Director of the Centre for Jewish Studies at the University of Toronto from 2008 to 2012, and Professor of Religious Studies and Classics at Yale University from 2012 to 2015.

== Education ==
Najman began her higher education at Michlalah-Jerusalem College for Women, currently simply Michlalah-Jerusalem College, at the time a women-only academic Torah study college in Israel, from 1984 to 1985. Returning to the United States, she attended Stern College for Women, Yeshiva University, where she majored in English literature and minored in music theory and Jewish studies: she graduated with a Bachelor of Arts (BA) degree in 1990. She taught at a high school from 1990 to 1992. She then became a graduate student at Harvard University, receiving a Master of Arts (MA) degree in 1997 and a Doctor of Philosophy (PhD) degree in 1998. Her doctoral advisor was James Kugel, and her thesis was titled "Authoritative Writing and Interpretation: A Study in the History of Scripture".

== Academic career ==
In 1998, Najman joined the University of Notre Dame as an assistant professor in its Department of Theology. She was awarded the Jordan Kapson Chair in Jewish Studies in 2002 and promoted to associate professor in 2004. In 2004, she became an associate professor in the Department of Near and Middle Eastern Civilizations of the University of Toronto, which she held concurrently with her Notre Dame post for one year. In 2008, she moved to Toronto's Department for the Study of Religion and became director of its Centre for Jewish Studies. In 2011, she moved to Yale University where she became an associate professor in its Department of Religious Studies and for the Program in Judaic Studies; she held secondary appointments in the Department of Classics and at Yale Divinity School. In 2014, she was promoted to Professor of Religious Studies and Judaic Studies.

In January 2015, it was announced that Najman would be the next Oriel and Laing Professor of the Interpretation of Holy Scripture at the University of Oxford, in succession to John Barton. She took up the post on 1 July 2015, and was elected a Fellow of Oriel College, Oxford. She has also been Director of the Centre for the Study of the Bible at Oriel College since 2017.

Najman was president of the British Association for Jewish Studies from 2019 to 2020.

== Awards and honors ==
In 2021 a portrait of Najman painted by artist Nneka Uzoigwe was hung in the dining hall of Oriel College, Oxford.

== Personal life ==
Najman is married to Paul W. Franks and they have two children.

== Selected works ==
- Najman, Hindy; Newman, Judith H., eds. (2008). The idea of biblical interpretation: essays in honor of James L. Kugel. Atlanta: Society of Biblical Literature. ISBN 978-1589833876.
- Brooke, George J.; Najman, Hindy; Stuckenbruck, Loren T., eds. (2008). The significance of Sinai: traditions about Sinai and divine revelation in Judaism and Christianity. Leiden: Brill. ISBN 978-9004170186.
- Najman, Hindy (2009). Seconding Sinai: the development of Mosaic discourse in Second Temple Judaism. Atlanta: Society of Biblical Literature. ISBN 978-1589834248.
- Metso, Sarianna; Najman, Hindy; Schuller, Eileen, eds. (2010). The Dead Sea scrolls: transmission of traditions and production of texts. Leiden: Brill. ISBN 978-9004185845.
- Najman, Hindy (2010). Past renewals: interpretative authority, renewed revelation, and the quest for perfection in Jewish antiquity. Leiden: Brill. ISBN 978-9004180468.
- Martínez, Florentino García; Najman, Hindy; Tigchelaar, Eibert, eds. (2013). Between philology and theology: contributions to the study of ancient Jewish interpretation. Leiden: Brill. ISBN 978-9004243934.
- Najman, Hindy (2014). Losing the Temple and recovering the future: an analysis of 4 Ezra. Cambridge: Cambridge University Press. ISBN 978-1107006188.
- Najman, Hindy (2024). Scriptural Vitality: Rethinking Philology and Hermeneutics. Oxford: Oxford University Press. ISBN 978-0198865711.

Academic offices
Preceded by John Barton	Oriel and Laing Professor of the Interpretation of Holy Scripture, University of Oxford; 2015 to present	Incumbent
