= A History of the Bible: The Book and Its Faiths =

2019 publication by Oxford scholar and Anglican priest John Barton

A History of the Bible: The Book and Its Faith is a 2019 publication from Penguin Books by Oxford scholar and Anglican priest John Barton. It traces the simultaneous consolidation of the Jewish Tanakh and the Christian Bible. He traces the multiple textual layers of standard Jewish texts and their ordering and similar scholarly attention to New Testament canonicity in monasteries.

Barton argues for a late (post-1000 BCE) stabilization of a Jewish holy book, in part an effort by Jews to preserve themselves from the geographical and intellectual hegemony of Christendom. Barton also argues that the dovetailing of Protestant and Jewish texts in the Old Testament occurred independently, with joint scholarship largely impossible until the 19th century. His primary theological contribution is the identification of "saga" layers in the Bible, particularly in Genesis and the Histories. These do not resemble mnemonics for genealogical memorization or religious homilies but rather the tribal hero stories of other world literature; the histories of King David form the largest example.
