= David C. Parker =

British theologian (born 1953)

- Born: 4 July 1953
- Alma mater: Leiden University; University of Cambridge
- Occupation: Theologian
- Employer: University of Birmingham
- Awards: Fellow of the Society of Antiquaries

David Charles Parker OBE (born 1953) was the Edward Cadbury Professor of Theology (2005–2017) and the Director of the Institute for Textual Scholarship and Electronic Editing at the Department of Theology and Religion, University of Birmingham. His interests include New Testament textual criticism and Greek and Latin palaeography.

== Quotes ==
Commenting on the text of the Greek New Testament, he said:

The text is changing. Every time that I make an edition of the Greek New Testament, or anybody does, we change the wording. We are maybe trying to get back to the oldest possible form but, paradoxically, we are creating a new one. Every translation is different, every reading is different, and although there’s been a tradition in parts of Protestant Christianity to say there is a definitive single form of the text, the fact is you can never find it. There is never ever a final form of the text.

Regarding a textual change in Codex Sinaiticus:

There is also a fascinating place in the codex in the Sermon on the Mount where we can see a change to the text altering the attitude to anger. Jesus says the person who is angry with his brother deserves judgement. But there is a variation on that. If you look at the page in Codex Sinaiticus you will see that somebody’s added a little word in the margin in Greek which changes it to “the person who is angry with his brother without good reason deserves judgement,” and there you’ve got two very different views of Christian life.

In consideration of the challenges of biblical text reconstruction, D. C. Parker said:

There is a sense in which there is no such thing as either the New Testament or the Gospels. What is available to us is a number of reconstructions of some or all of the documents classified as belonging to the New Testament - some of these reconstructions are manuscripts, say P75 or Codex Vaticanus; others are printed texts like Nestle-Aland. Textual criticism makes it clear that the text is in a sense inaccessible to us. The fact that the recovery of the original text is a task that remains beyond all of us sets a question mark against any claim that we can in any sense 'possess' the text literally or metaphorically.

== Works ==
=== Books ===
- Parker, David C. (1989). Paul's Letter to the Colossians by Philip Melanchthon. Historic Texts and Interpreters in Biblical Scholarship. Vol. 8. Sheffield: The Almond Press. ISBN 9781850752103. OCLC 20219850. - translated with an introduction and notes
- ——— (1992). Codex Bezae: An Early Christian Manuscript and Its Text. Cambridge, UK: Cambridge University Press. ISBN 9780521400374. OCLC 21909160.
- ———; Elliott, W. J. (1995). The New Testament in Greek IV. The Gospel According to St. John - edited by the American And British Committees of the International Greek New Testament Project - Volume One The Papyri. New Testament Tools and Studies. Vol. 20. Leiden: E. J. Brill. ISBN 9789004099401. OCLC 54308733.
- ———; Amphoux, Christian-Bernard (1996). Codex Bezae: Studies from the Lunel Colloquium June 1994. New Testament Tools and Studies. Vol. 22 (with. Leiden: E. J. Brill. ISBN 9789004103931. OCLC 33207845.
- ——— (1997). The Living Text of the Gospels. Cambridge, UK: Cambridge University Press. ISBN 9780521590624. OCLC 35808327.
- ———; Parker, T. H. L. (1999). Calvini Commentarius in Epistolam ad Romanos. Ioannis Calvini Opera Omnia denuo Recognita et Adnotatione Critica Instructa Notique Illustrata, Series II Opera Exegetica Veteris et Novi Testamenti. Geneva: Droz.
- ———; Mullen, R. L.; Crisp, Simon (2007). The Byzantine Text of the Gospel of John. Stuttgart: German Bible Society.
- ———; Elliott, W. J.; Schmid, U. B. (2007). The New Testament in Greek IV. The Gospel According to St. John Edited by the American and British Committees of the International Greek New Testament Project. Volume Two The Majuscules. New Testament Tools, Studies and Documents. Vol. 37. Leiden: E. J. Brill. ISBN 9789047421481. OCLC 536021224.
- ———; Houghton, H. A. G. (2008). Textual Variation: Theological and Social Tendencies? Papers from the Fifth Birmingham Colloquium on the Textual Criticism of the New Testament. Texts and Studies: 3rd series. Vol. 6. Piscataway, NJ: Gorgias Press. ISBN 9781593337896. OCLC 213384852.
- ——— (2008). An Introduction to the New Testament Manuscripts and their Texts. Cambridge, UK: Cambridge University Press. ISBN 9780521895538. OCLC 191927155.
- ——— (2009). Manuscripts, Texts, Theology. Collected Papers 1977-2007. Βerlin & New York: De Gruyter. ISBN 9783110211948. OCLC 516213768.
- ——— (2010). Codex Sinaiticus. The Story of the World's Oldest Bible. London & Peabody, MA: British Library & Hendrikson. ISBN 9780712358033. OCLC 655678731.
- ——— (2012). Textual Scholarship and the Making of the New Testament. Lyell lectures, 2011. Oxford: Oxford University Press. ISBN 9780199657810. OCLC 780482794.

=== Edited by ===
- ——; Childers, Jeff W., eds. (2006). Transmission and Reception: New Testament Text-critical and Exegetical Studies. Texts and Studies. Vol. 4. Piscataway, NJ: Gorgias Press. ISBN 9781593333676. OCLC 70701505.

=== Journal articles ===
- ——— (2000). "The New Oxyrhynchus Papyrus of Revelation (P115)". New Testament Studies. 46: 159–74. doi:10.1017/S0028688500000102. S2CID 203366569.
- ——— (2001). "Et Incarnatus Est". Scottish Journal of Theology. 54: 192–228.
- ——— (2002). "The Quest of the Critical Edition". Variants. 1: 33–42.
- ——— (2003). "A Comparison Between the Text und Textwert and the Claremont Profile Method Analyses of Manuscripts in the Gospel of Luke". New Testament Studies. 49: 108–138.
- ——— (2003). "Through a Screen Darkly: Digital Texts and the New Testament". Journal for the Study of the New Testament. 25 (4): 395–411. doi:10.1177/0142064X0302500401. S2CID 161146588.
- ——— (2006). "The Text of the New Testament, by B.M. Metzger and B.D. Ehrman". Journal of Theological Studies. 57: 551–67. - review article
- ——— (2007). "Textual Criticism and Theology". Expository Times. 118 (12): 583–589. doi:10.1177/0014524607081679. S2CID 171034631.
