= George Albert Cooke =

British Anglican clergyman and academic

The Reverend Canon G. A. Cooke
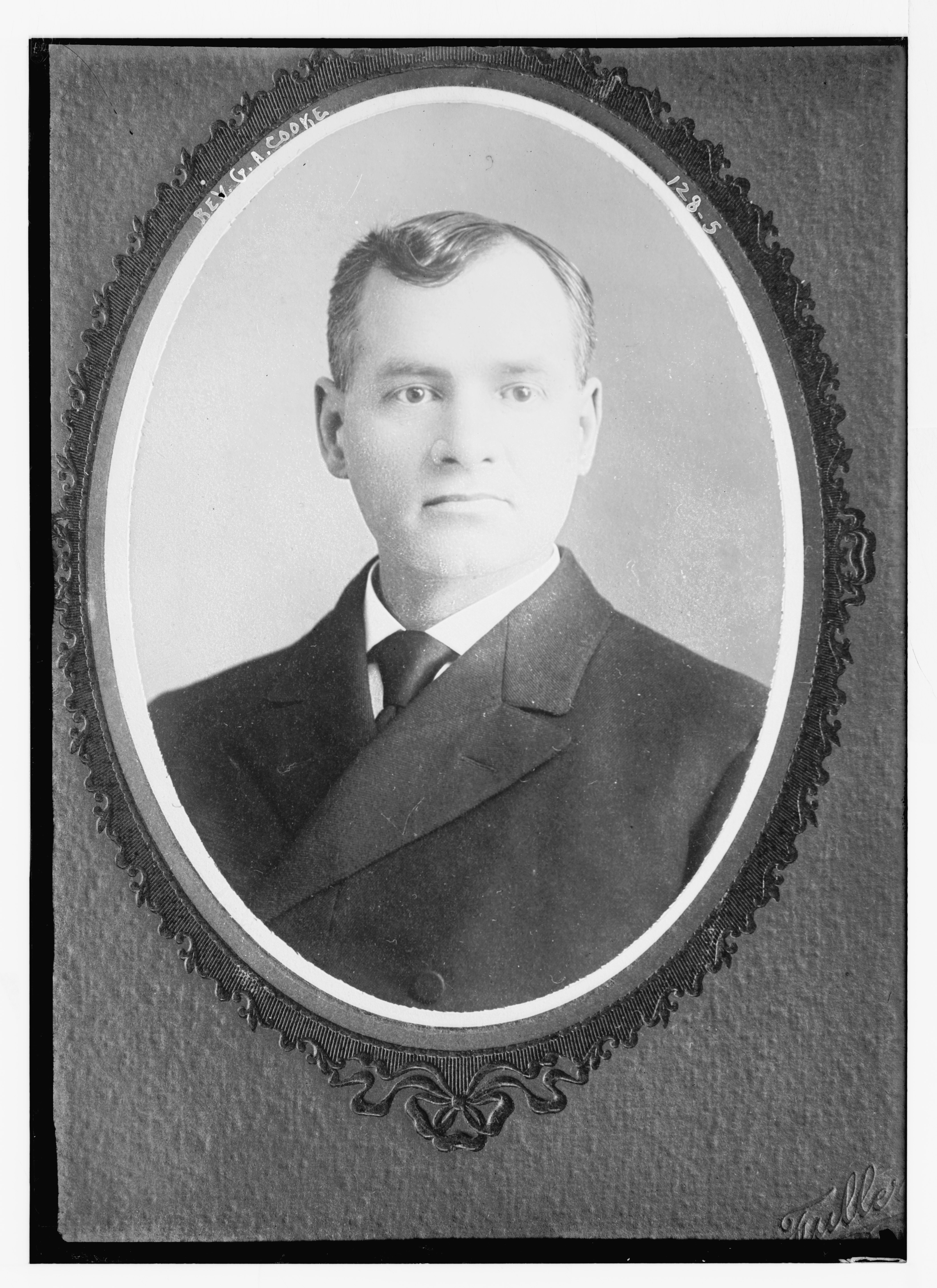
- Born: George Albert Cooke; 26 November 1865; London, England
- Died: 9 September 1939 (aged 73); Cheltenham, England
- Spouse: Frances Helen Cooke (m. 1897; died 1932)

Academic background
- Education: Wadham College, Oxford

Academic work
- Discipline: Theology
- Sub-discipline: Old Testament; Hebrew; exegesis
- Institutions: St John's College, Oxford; Magdalen College, Oxford; Oriel College, Oxford; Christ Church, Oxford

Ecclesiastical career
- Religion: Christianity (Anglican)
- Church: Church of England
- Ordained: 1889
- Congregations: St Andrew's Church, Headington; University Church of St Mary the Virgin, Oxford; St Mary's Cathedral, Edinburgh; Christ Church Cathedral, Oxford

George Albert Cooke (26 November 1865 – 9 September 1939) was a British Anglican clergyman and academic. He held two senior chairs at the University of Oxford: Oriel Professor of the Interpretation of Holy Scripture from 1908 to 1914, and Regius Professor of Hebrew from 1914 to 1936.

== Biography ==
Cooke was born on 26 November 1865 in London, England, to George Isaac Foster Cooke, a barrister, and his wife Agnes Marian Cooke (née Mackenzie). The pioneer physician Sir Morell Mackenzie was his uncle on his mother's side, as was the general practitioner Sir Stephen Mackenzie.

Cooke was educated at Merchant Taylors' School, then an all-boys public school in London. At the time, the school still taught Hebrew. From 1884 to 1888, he studied theology at Wadham College, Oxford, graduating with a second-class honours Bachelor of Arts (BA) degree.

In 1889, Cooke was ordained in the Church of England and became assistant curate of Headington, Oxford. In the same year, he joined St John's College, Oxford as a senior scholar and Hebrew lecturer. He was made chaplain of Magdalen College, Oxford in 1890 and elected a fellow in 1892. He was additionally curate of University Church of St Mary the Virgin, Oxford, from 1894 to 1896, and Rector of Beaconsfield, Buckinghamshire from 1896 to 1899.

From 1899 to 1908, Cooke was the private chaplain to the Duke of Buccleuch, based at Dalkeith Palace, Midlothian, Scotland. Additionally, he was warden of the Community of St Andrew of Scotland from 1904 to 1908, and a canon of St Mary's Cathedral, Edinburgh from 1907 to 1908. He remained an honorary canon of St Mary's Cathedral from 1909.

In 1908, he returned to the University of Oxford where he had been elected Oriel Professor of the Interpretation of Holy Scripture and a fellow of Oriel College, Oxford. That year, he was also made a canon of Rochester Cathedral. Then, in 1914, he was elected Regius Professor of Hebrew and made a canon of Christ Church Cathedral, Oxford.

Cooke resigned his Oxford posts in 1936, and returned to parish ministry as rector of Bettiscombe, a small village in Dorset. The parish consisted of less than 100 persons, leaving him plenty of time to dedicate himself to writing and translating. He published Critical and Exegetical Commentary on the Book of Ezekiel in 1937, and The Prayer Book Psalter Revised in 1939.

Cooke died on 9 September 1939 in Cheltenham, Gloucestershire. His funeral was held at Christ Church Cathedral in Oxford on 12 September.

== Personal life ==
In 1897, Cooke married Frances Helen (née Anderson), daughter of a Dundee businessman. Together, they had four daughters. His wife predeceased him in 1932. One of his daughters, Agnes Margaret, was the first wife of newspaper magnate Cecil Harmsworth King.

== Honours ==
In 1911, Cooke was award an honorary Doctor of Divinity (DD) degree by the University of Edinburgh.

== Works ==
- A text-book of north-Semitic inscriptions. Oxford: The Clarendon Press. 1903.
- The Book of Judges and the Book of Ruth. Cambridge: Cambridge University Press. 1913. (part of the Cambridge Bible for Schools and Colleges)
- A critical and exegetical commentary on the Book of Ezekiel. Edinburgh: T&T Clark. 1936.
- The Prayer Book Psalter Revised. Oxford: The Clarendon Press. 1939.
