= Charles Fox Burney =

Charles Fox Burney (4 November 1868 – 15 April 1925) was a biblical scholar at Oxford University, England.

== Early life ==
Charles was the son of Charles Burney, Paymaster Chief Royal Navy, and his wife Eleanor Norton, daughter of the Rev. W. A. Norton, rector of Alderton and Eye, Suffolk. He was educated at Merchant Taylors' School, and St John's College, Oxford.

== Career ==
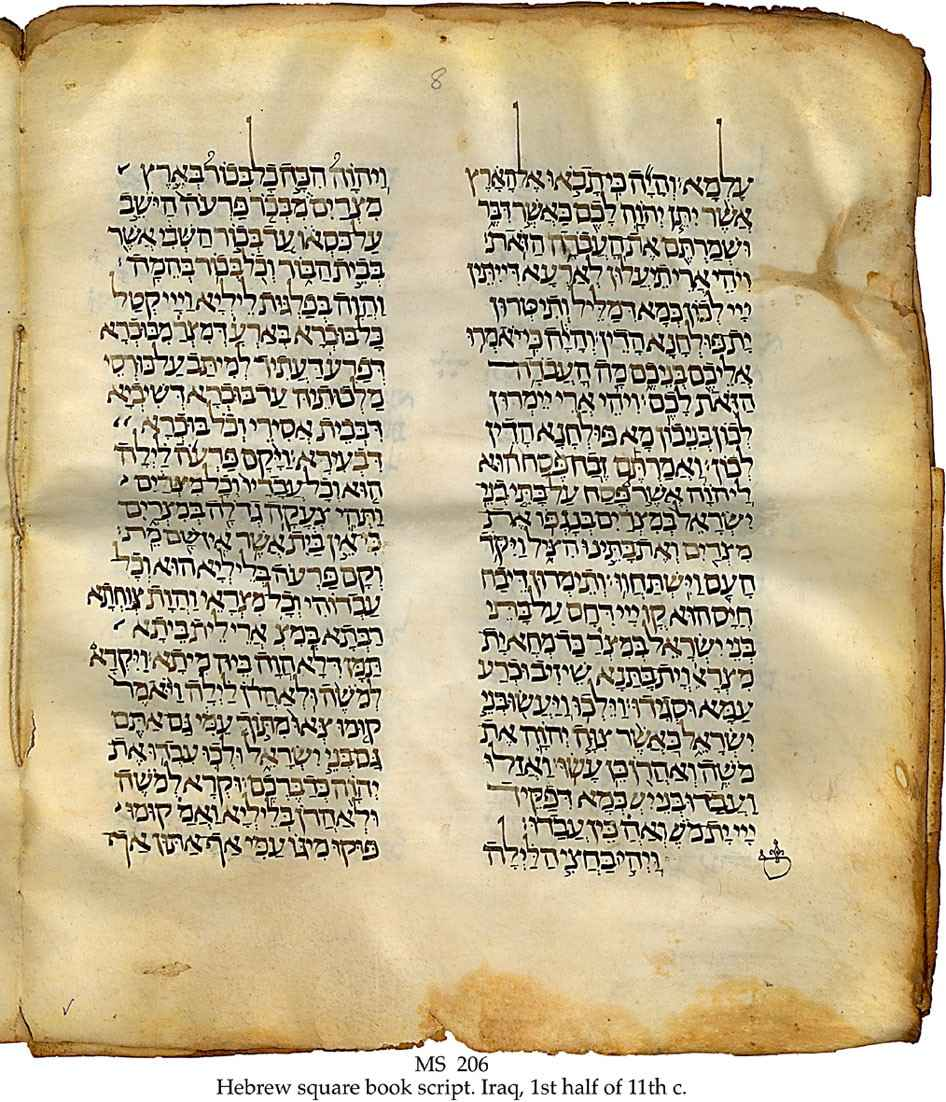
11th century Hebrew Bible with Targum

In 1893 Burney was elected Senior Scholar of St John's and lecturer in Hebrew. He became a Fellow of St John's in 1899 and Vice President in 1900, 1906, 1910 and 1911. In June 1914, Dr Burney became the Oriel Professor of the Interpretation of Holy Scripture, and was additionally elected a Fellow of Oriel College, Oxford in 1919.

Burney published several works on biblical history, all as "The Rev. C. F. Burney, M.A., D. Litt.". In Israel's settlement in Canaan, he brought much new or newly applied material, especially from Babylonian sources, to explain Israel's early residence in Canaan. A major contribution was the theory that Yahweh (Jehovah) was at an early period an Amorite deity. In The Aramaic Origin of the Fourth Gospel he attempted to prove that St John's Gospel was a literal Greek translation of a Gospel written in Aramaic by a Jewish disciple, and this at least led to an accepted view that the author thought in Aramaic, and strengthened the probability that it was the work of an eyewitness.

== Family ==
In 1913 at the age of 45 he married Ethel Wordsworth Madan (1891–1984), the elder daughter of Falconer Madan and his wife Frances Hayter. In 1929 Ethel Burney started work for Rosalind Moss at the Griffith Institute at Oxford. Together Moss and Burney continued the work that had been started by Bertha Porter (with Moss as her assistant) in the early 1920s on the Topographical Bibliography of Ancient Egyptian Hieroglyphic Texts, Reliefs, and Paintings. 'The Two Ladies' as they were known travelled throughout the Middle East and the rest of the world until the late 1960s visiting digs, museums and collections, and gathering data for the many volumes of the Topographical Bibliography that they produced together with a small team of collaborators.

Charles and Ethel's daughter, Venetia Phair, is famed for proposing the name Pluto for the erstwhile planet, at the age of 11.

== Publications ==
- Outlines of Old Testament Theology (London, 1899)
- Encyclopaedia Biblica (contributor, 1903)
- Notes on the Hebrew Text of the Books of Kings (Oxford: Clarendon, 1903)
- Israel's Settlement in Canaan: The Biblical Tradition and its Historical Background (Schweich Lecture for 1917, London: OUP)
- Israel's Hope of immortality: four lectures (Oxford: Clarendon, 1909)
- The Book of Judges, with introduction and notes (London: Rivingtons, 1918)
- The Gospel in the Old Testament (T & T Clark, Edinburgh, 1921)
- C.F. Burney (1922). The Aramaic Origin of the Fourth Gospel. Oxford: Clarendon. Also available in another format.
- The Poetry of Our Lord (Oxford: Clarendon, 1925)
