= Oriel and Laing Professor of the Interpretation of Holy Scripture =

The Oriel and Laing Professor of the Interpretation of Holy Scripture (until 1991 the Oriel Professor of the Interpretation of Holy Scripture) is a chair in theology, particular Old Testament studies, at the University of Oxford. Oriel College, Oxford, decided in 1876 to establish a chair in theology, funded by the revenue from a canonry at Rochester Cathedral controlled by the college. The first professor, John Wordsworth, was appointed in 1883. The chair was renamed in 1991 to mark a donation from the Laing Foundation that secured its endowment. The professorship carries with it a fellowship of Oriel College.

== List of holders ==
- John Wordsworth 1883–85
- Thomas Kelly Cheyne 1885–1908
- George Albert Cooke 1908–14
- Charles Fox Burney 1914–25
- David Capell Simpson 1925–50
- Hedley Sparks 1952–76
- James Barr 1976–78
- Ernest Nicholson 1979–90
- John Barton 1991–2014 (now Emeritus Professor)
- Hindy Najman 2015–present
