= Thomas Koonammakkal =

Indian priest, syriacist, scholar, and church historian

Fr. Dr. Thomas Koonammakkal
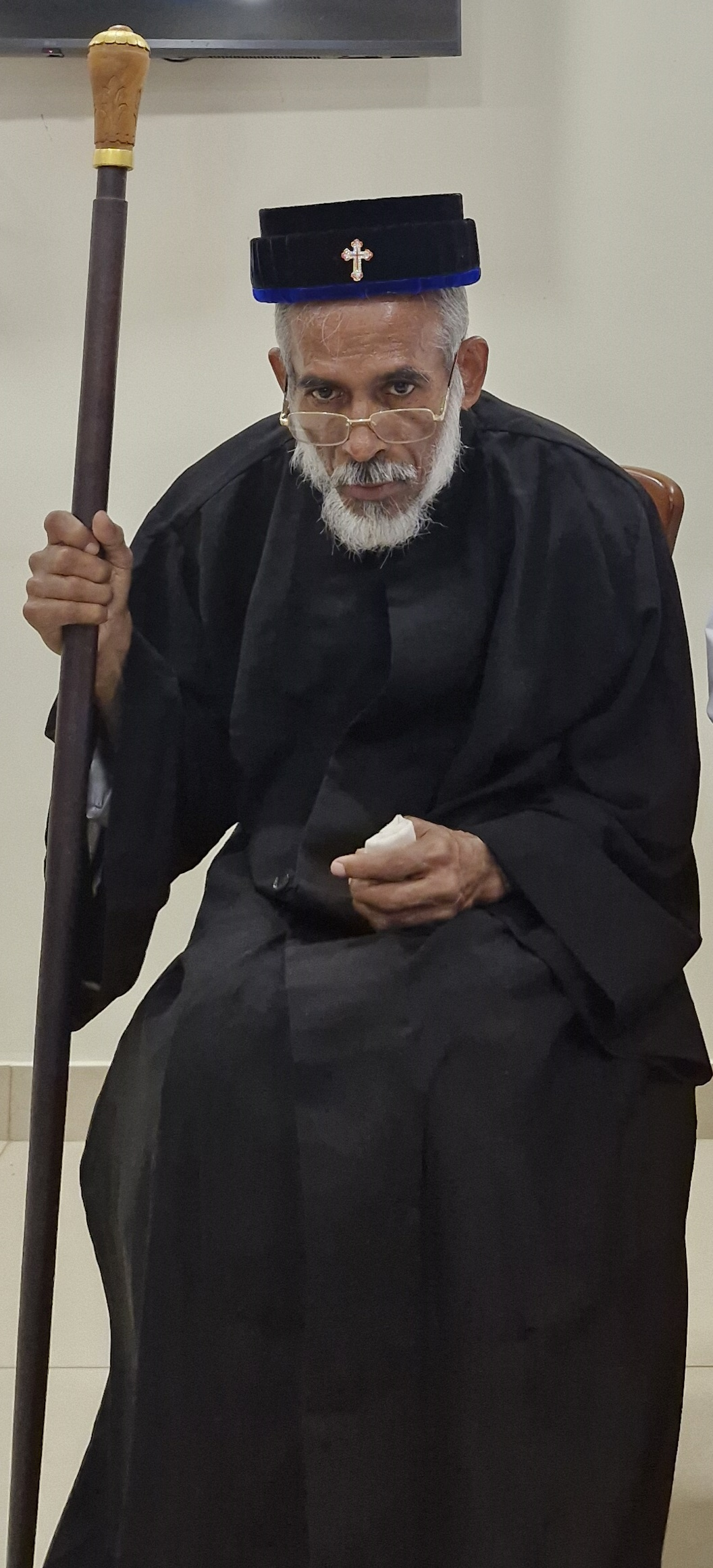
- Born: Thoma; 5 November 1955; Ramapuram, Kottayam District, Kerala, India
- Died: 3 May 2026 (aged 70)
- Occupations: Liturgist; author; Syriacist; professor; scholar; historian; monastic

Thomas Koonammakkal (Koonammakkal Thoma kathanar) was a Syro-Malabar Catholic priest and syriacist, scholar and church historian. He was an expert in Karshoni Malayalam and was the author of the most comprehensive Karshoni Malayalam introduction to date. He has also authored several critical articles on Early Christianity and on the works of Saint Ephrem. He held a master's degree in Syriac studies and a doctorate from the University of Oxford. He served as the professor of Syriac and Patrology in SEERI, Vadavathoor Saint Thomas Apostolic Seminary and Paurastya Vidyapitham. He was the founder of Beth Aprem Nazrani Dayara and was a strong advocate of traditionalism in the Syro-Malabar Catholic Church.

== Selected publications ==
- The Theology of Divine Names in the Genuine Works of Ephrem (1991)
- Divine Names and Theological Language in Ephrem (in Studia Patristica, volume XXV, edited by Elizabeth A. Livingstone, Peeters Publishers, 1993)
- St. Ephrem and Greek Wisdom (in IV Symposium Syriacum 1992 edited by René Lavenant, Pontificio Instituto Orientale, 1994)
- Ephrem on the Name of Jesus (in Studia Patristica, volume XXXIII, edited by Elizabeth A. Livingstone, 1997)
- An Introduction to Malayalam Karshon (in The Harp, volume XV, 2002)
- Ephrem's Theology of Humour (in Studia Patristica, volume XLI, edited by Frances Margaret Young, Mark J. Edwards, Paul M. Parvis, 2006)
- Ephrem’s Ideas on Singleness (in Hugoye: Journal of Syriac Studies, volume 2, no. 1, 2010).
- Fr. Emmanuel Thelly (in The Harp (Volume 21): Festschrift: Rev. Fr. Emmanuel Thelly, 2011)
- Syro-Malabar History and Traditions (in Orientalia Christiana: Festschrift für Hubert Kaufhold zum 70. Geburtstag, edited by Peter Bruns, Heinz Otto Luthe, 2013)
- The Passover celebration of the Mar Thoma Nazranis and the origins of Christianity in India (in Parole de l'Orient (volume 41), 2015)
- The Church in the Churches: a Syriac ecclesiology (2018)
- Ephrem on the Icon of Nature (in Edessa in hellenistisch-römischer Zeit, 2009)
- Karshon: Malayalam in Syriac characters (in The Harp, volume XXX, 2016)
- Problem of latinization : no exit? (2017)
- Acts of Thomas re-examined in the light of the Song of Thomâ Ramban (in The Harp, volume XXXIII, 2018)
- Ephrem's philosophy of theological language (in Parole de l'Orient (volume 46), 2020)
