= Stroumsa =

Stroumsa is a surname. Notable people with the surname include:

- Guy Stroumsa (born 1948), Israeli scholar of religion
- Sarah Stroumsa (born 1950), Israeli Arabist
