= Allen Brent =

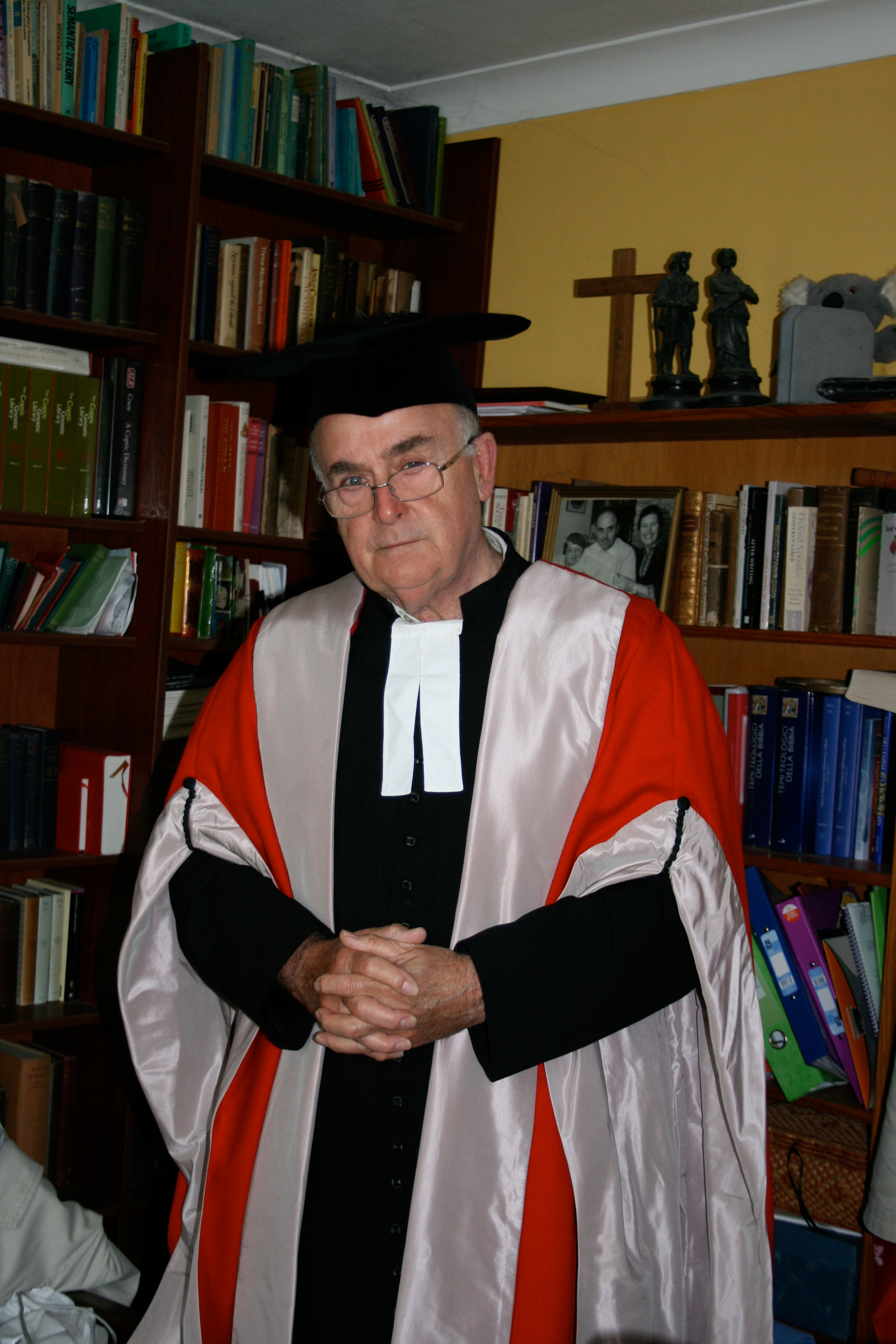
Allen Brent, Cambridge Doctor of Divinity

Allen Brent is a scholar of early Christian history and literature. He is a fellow of St Edmund's College, Cambridge, formerly Dean (2012–2013), was an affiliated lecturer in the Faculty of Divinity, University of Cambridge from 1998 to 2010, and was later appointed Professor in Early Christian History and Iconography at King's College London, and joint researcher with Professor Markus Vinzent on a two-year BARDA project: Early Christian Epigraphy and Iconography after Dölger. He is also Professore Invitato at the Augustinianum (Lateran University), Rome. He was formerly Principal Lecturer in Philosophy at University of Huddersfield, and has previously been Professor of History at James Cook University. He was ordained a deacon for the Catholic Ordinariate of Our Lady of Walsingham on 28 April 2011 and a priest on 15 June 2011.

He has published widely on prominent early Christian figures including Hippolytus of Rome, Ignatius of Antioch, and Cyprian. Brent currently co-edits the Studia Patristica with Markus Vinzent.

== Books ==
- The Imperial Cult and the Development of Church Order: Concepts and Images of Authority in Paganism and Early Christianity before the Age of Cyprian, Supplements to Vigiliae Christianae 45, (Leiden: Brill 1999)
  - Reviews:F. Caruso, Vetera Christianorum, 40.1 (2003) pp. 176–177.
  - Review, H. Chadwick, Journal of Ecclesiastical History, 52.4 (2001), p. 704.
  - Review, L. Holt, Church History, 71.4 (2002), pp. 867–870.
  - Review, J.M. Auwers, Revue histoire ecclesiastique, 97.1 (2002), pp. 337–338.
  - Review, H.A. Drake, Journal of Early Christian Studies, 9.3 (2001), pp. 403–405.
- Hippolytus and the Roman Church in the Third Century: Communities in Tension before the Emergence of a Monarch-Bishop, in Supplements to Vigiliae Christianae 31 (Leiden: E.J. Brill 1995).
  - Review: R.M. Grant, Church History, 65.4 (1996), pp. 660–662.
  - Review, A. Stewart Sykes, Sobornotst Eastern Church Review, 18.2 (1996), pp. 74–75.
  - Review, B. Leadbetter, Journal of Religious History, 20.2 (1996), pp. 249–251.
  - Review, R. Butterworth, Journal of Theological Studies, 47.2 (1996), pp. 671–676.
  - Review, D.A. Bertrand, Revue d'histoire et philosophie religieuse, 1997, pp. 340–341.
  - Review, J.A. Cerrato, Journal of Early Christian Studies, 4.4 (1996), pp. 536–538.
  - Review, F.J. Weismann, Cuadernos Monsticos, 119 (1996), pp. 547–548.
  - Review, J.M. Auwers, Revue histoire ecclesiastique, 92.3–4 (1997), pp. 1028–1029.
  - Review, G. Bonner, Journal of Ecclesiastical History, 48.3 (1997), pp. 517–519.
  - Review, R.L. Wilken, Catholic Historical Review, 112.446 (1997), pp. 469–470.
  - Review, Ph. Luisier, Orientalia Christiana Periodica, 62 (1996–7), pp. 232–234.
  - Review, P. Vallin, Recherches de science religieuse, 85.2 (1997), pp. 307–311.
  - Review, R. Trevijano, Salmanticensis, 44 (1997), pp. 422–430.
  - Review, J. Taylor, Ephemerides Liturgicae, 111 (1997), pp. 404–406.
  - Review, D. Tripp, Doxology: A Journal of Worship, 17 (2000), pp. 79–80.
- Philosophical Foundations for the Curriculum, (Allen & Unwin 1978)
- Philosophy and Educational Foundations, (Allen & Unwin 1983)..
- Ignatius of Antioch and the Second Sophistic, in Studien und Texte zu Antike und Christentum 36 (Tübingen: Mohr Siebeck 2006).
- Ignatius of Antioch, a Martyr Bishop and the origin of Episcopacy (London and New York: Continuum 2007).
- A Political History of Early Christianity, (London and New York: Continuum 2009).
- Cyprian and Roman Carthage, (Cambridge, 2010).
- Cyprian: The Unity of the Church. Select Letters and Treatises, translated with introduction and commentary, ( New York: St. Vladimir Orthodox Press 2005).

== Peer-reviewed articles ==
- Ignatius of Antioch in the Second Sophistic, Zeitschrift für Antikes Christentum, 2005.
- Cyprian’s Reconstruction of the Martyr Tradition, Journal of Ecclesiastical History 53,2 (2002), pp. 241–268.
- Cyprian and the question of ordinatio per confessionem, Studia Patristica 36 (2001), pp. 323–337.
- Cyprian’s Exegesis and Roman Political Rhetoric, in L’Esegesi dei Padri Latini dale origini a Gregorio Magno, Studia Ephemeridis Augustinianum, 68 (2000), pp. 145–158..
- John As Theologos: The Imperial Mysteries and The Apocalypse, Journal for the Study of the New Testament, 75(1999), pp. 87–102.
- Ignatius of Antioch and the Imperial Cult, Vigiliae Christianae, 52,1 (1998), pp. 30–58.
- Luke-Acts and the Imperial Cult in Asia Minor, Journal of Theological Studies, 48.2 (1997), pp. 411–438.
- The Ignatian Epistles and the Threefold Ecclesiastical Order, Journal of Religious History, 17,1 (1992), pp. 18–32.
- The Relations between Ignatius of Antioch and the Didascalia Apostolorum, Second Century, 8,3 (1991), pp. 129–156.
- Ecumenical Reconciliation and Cultural Episcopates, Anglican Theological Review, 72,3 (1990), pp. 255–279.
- History and Eschatological Mysticism in Ignatius of Antioch, Ephemerides Theologicae Lovanienses, 65,4 (1989), pp. 309–329.
- Pseudonymity and Charisma in the Ministry of the Early Church, Augustinianum, 27,3 (1987), pp. 347–376.
- The Investiture Controversy- an issue in Sacramental Theology? Ephemerides Theologicae Lovanienses, 63,1 (1987), pp. 59–89.
- Newman’s Moral Conversion, Downside Review 355 (1986), pp. 79–94.
- The Hermesian Dimension to the Newman-Perrone Dialogue, Ephemerides Theologicae Lovanienses 61,1 (1985), pp. 73–99.
- Newman and Perrone: Irreconcilable Theses on Development, Downside Review 349 (1984), pp. 276–289.
- Newman’s Conversion, the Via Media, and the Myth of the Romeward Movement, in Downside Review 345 (1983), pp. 261–280.
- Transcendental Arguments for Forms of Knowledge, Journal of Philosophy of Education 16,2. (1982), pp. 265–274.
- Multicultural Education and Relativism, Journal of Philosophy of Education, 16,1 (1982), pp. 125–130.
- The Sociology of Knowledge and Epistemology, British Journal of Educational Studies Vol.23 No.2 June (1975), pp. 209–224.
- Can Wilson’s Moral Criteria Be Justified? Journal of Moral Education Vol.2 No.3 June (1973), pp. 203–210.
