= Faculty of Theology and Religion, University of Oxford =

Department of the University of Oxford, England

Coordinates: 51.7576°N 1.2604°W

The faculty of theology and religion is an academic department of the humanities division of the University of Oxford in Oxford, England. It co-ordinates the teaching of theology at the university.

The theology faculty centre was at 34 St Giles' in central Oxford. It is now housed as part of the Stephen A. Schwarzman Centre for the Humanities

== History ==
One of the first series of lectures delivered at Oxford University was on theology. As early as 1193, Alexander Neckam from St Albans gave biblical and moral lectures on the Psalms of David and the Wisdom of Solomon. One of the first university buildings was the Divinity School, begun in 1423 specifically for theology lectures.

The modern theological faculty emerged during the reform of the University of Oxford in the nineteenth century. Although an honour school in theology was recommended from as early as 1853, it was not until the late 1860s, amidst concerns about the declining influence of the established church in the university, that Edward Pusey and Henry Parry Liddon began to advocate the introduction of a separate school of theology responsible for the training of Anglican ordinands. Its curriculum was biblical and historical in its focus, with its first examinations requiring knowledge of scripture, ecclesiastical history and patristics, dogmatic and symbolic theology, apologetics, liturgy and sacred criticism. The final honour school of theology – as a route to the Bachelor of Arts degree – was introduced in 1869. Up until then, theological study was the reserve of graduates and those seeking ordination in the Church of England, who would attend a short series of lectures by the regius professors on basic divinity.

The faculty remained as a stronghold of the Church of England well into the 20th century, with denominational restrictions on the higher theological degrees (the Bachelor of Divinity and the Doctor of Divinity) and examiners in the final honour school of theology only being abolished in 1920 and 1922 respectively. Three of the regius professorships remain linked to canonries at Christ Church Cathedral, requiring their holders to be in ordained in the Church of England or a church in communion with the Church of England. A significant proportion of the faculty's students are preparing for ordination, either as candidates for the BA or the BTh.

Despite the faculty's historic links to the Church of England, the foundation of nonconformist and Roman Catholic institutions in Oxford from the late 19th century onwards, alongside changing academic and ecclesiastical attitudes towards theological study, resulted in the gradual transformation of theology from a purely professional discipline into an aspect of humanistic study.

During the 20th century, Oxford established itself as an internationally significant centre of theological study with important contributions from S. R. Driver, William Sanday, C. H. Turner, B. H. Streeter, N. P. Williams, R. H. Lightfoot, G. R. Driver, Austin Farrer, Maurice Wiles, Henry Chadwick, James Barr and Arthur Peacocke. Although the department introduced examination papers in modern systematic theology, world religions and even separate postgraduate master's degrees in the study of religion, the final honour school of theology has remained primarily focused on biblical and historical study. Undergraduates devote at least half of their degree to Christian theology.

== Professors ==
=== Statutory professorships ===
The following statutory professorships are held in conjunction with a canonry of Christ Church: the professor must be ordained in priest's orders in the Church of England or in an Anglican church in communion with the Church of England, or eligible for and prepared to accept ordination.

- Regius Professor of Divinity - Canon Andrew Paul Davison, Canon of Christ Church (2024–present)
- Lady Margaret Professor of Divinity - Canon Carol Harrison
- Regius Professor of Moral and Pastoral Theology - Vacant (Canon Nigel Biggar is currently the Regius Professor Emeritus of the Chair)

The following statutory professorship is held in conjunction with a canonry of Christ Church: the professor must be ordained in priest's orders in the Church of England or in an episcopal church in communion with the Church of England, or eligible for and prepared to accept ordination; alternatively, in accordance the Church of England (Miscellaneous Provisions) Measure 1995 §2, the professorship may be held in conjunction with a lay canonry: the professor must be a lay member of the Church of England, or of any church in communion with it, or a minister or lay member of a church not in communion with the Church of England provided he or she is a suitably qualified member of one of the churches to which the Church of England (Ecumenical Relations) Measure 1988 refers.

- Regius Professor of Ecclesiastical History - Vacant
- Oriel and Laing Professor of the Interpretation of Holy Scripture (attached to a fellowship at Oriel) - Hindy Najman
- Dean Ireland's Professor of the Exegesis of Holy Scripture (attached to a fellowship at Keble) - Markus Bockmuehl
- Nolloth Professor of the Philosophy of the Christian Religion (attached to a fellowship at Oriel) - Mark Wynn
- Andreas Idreos Professor of Science and Religion (attached to a fellowship at Harris Manchester) - Mark Harris
- Professor of the Study of the Abrahamic Religions (attached to a fellowship at Lady Margaret Hall) - Anna Abulafia

=== Other professors ===
- Paul Fiddes: Professor of Systematic Theology (Fellow Emeritus Regent's Park)
- Martin Goodman: Professor of Jewish Studies (fellow of Wolfson)

== Ian Ramsey centre for science and religion ==
The Ian Ramsey centre for science and religion, named after Bishop Ian Ramsey, is a research institute within the faculty of theology and religion. The centre studies the relationship of science to religion and theology, and conducts research on new perspectives on theological concepts given by sciences and on the application of scientific methods to the study of religious phenomena. The director of the Ian Ramsey centre is Professor Mark Harris, Andreas Indreos chair in science and religion, attached to a professorial fellowship at Harris Manchester College.
