= George Pattison =

English theologian and Anglican priest

The Reverend George Pattison
- Born: George Linsley Pattison; 1950 (age 75–76)

Ecclesiastical career
- Religion: Christianity (Anglican)
- Church: Church of England

Academic background
- Education: University of Edinburgh; Durham University
- Thesis: Kierkegaard's Theory and Critique of Art (1983)

Academic work
- Discipline: Theology
- Sub-discipline: Philosophical theology; systematic theology
- Institutions: King's College, Cambridge; Aarhus University; Christ Church, Oxford; University of Glasgow

George Linsley Pattison (born 1950) is a retired English theologian and Anglican priest. His last post prior to retirement was as Professor of Divinity at the University of Glasgow. He was previously Lady Margaret Professor of Divinity at the University of Oxford. From 2017 to 2019 he was a Senior Co-Fund Fellow at the Max Weber Center at the University of Erfurt. He has also been an Affiliate Professor in Systematic Theology at the University of Copenhagen (2011–) and an Honorary Professor in the Faculty of Theology at the University of St Andrews (2021–).

== Early life and education ==
He holds Bachelor of Divinity and MA degrees from the University of Edinburgh. He completed his PhD degree at the University of Durham.

== Academic career ==
Pattison was Dean of the Chapel of King's College, Cambridge (1991–2001), and then an associate professor at the University of Århus (2002–03).

In 2004, Pattison succeeded John Webster as Lady Margaret Professor of Divinity at the University of Oxford. He was also a Canon of Christ Church Cathedral, Oxford from 2004 to 2013.

Pattison became 1640 Chair of Divinity at the University of Glasgow in 2013, succeeding Werner Jeanrond who then became Master of St Benet's Hall at the University of Oxford in 2012. In 2017, Pattison gave the Bampton Lectures at the University of Oxford; the series was titled "A Phenomenology of the Devout Life". These have now been published as first of a three part "Philosophy of Christian Life" under the same title. Parts 2 and 3 are entitled "A Rhetorics of the Word" and "A Metaphysics of Love".

Pattison's works range from historical, theological and philosophical engagement with the critical reception of German Idealism in such figures as Søren Kierkegaard, Martin Heidegger and Fyodor Dostoyevsky to theological studies of the aesthetics of film and the visual arts. His latest work has used existential phenomenology to explore themes of ontology, language, love and the meaning of God.

== Selected works ==
- Kierkegaard's Theory and Critique of Art: Its Theological Significance (PhD thesis). Durham, England: Durham University. 1983. OCLC 15248798.
- Art, Modernity and Faith (1991)
- Kierkegaard: the Aesthetic and the Religious (Palgrave Macmillan, 1992) ISBN 9781349118205
- Agnosis: Theology in the Void (Palgrave Macmillan, 1996) ISBN 9780333638644
- Kierkegaard and the Crisis of Faith (1997) ISBN 9781625645029
- The End of Theology and the Task of Thinking about God (SCM Press, 1998) ISBN 9780334027539
- Anxious Angels: A Retrospective View of Religious Existentialism (Palgrave Macmillan, 1999) ISBN 9780333687390
- The Later Heidegger (2000) ISBN 9780415201971
- A Short Course in the Philosophy of Religion (2001)
- Dostoevsky and the Christian Tradition (ed. with D.Thompson, Cambridge University Press, 1991) ISBN 9780521782784
- A Short Course in Christian Doctrine (Hymns Ancient & Modern Ltd, 2005) ISBN 9780334029786
- The Philosophy of Kierkegaard (McGill-Queen's, 2005) ISBN 9780773529878
- Thinking about God in an Age of Technology (Oxford University Press, 2006) ISBN 9780199279777
- Crucifixions and Resurrections of the Image: Reflections on Art and Modernity (SCM, 2009) ISBN 9780334043416
- God and Being: An Enquiry (OUP, 2011) ISBN 9780199588688
- Eternal God/Saving Time (OUP, 2015)
- A Phenomenology of the Devout Life (OUP, 2018)
- A Rhetorics of the Word (OUP, 2019)
- A Metaphysics of Love (OUP, 2021)
- Conversations with Dostoevsky on God, Russia, Literature, and Life (OUP, 2024)
- Heidegger and Kierkegaard - Elements in the Philosophy of Martin Heidegger (CUP, 2025)

== See also ==
- Faculty of Theology and Religion, University of Oxford

Academic offices
Preceded by John Webster	Lady Margaret Professor of Divinity; 2004–2013	Succeeded by Carol Harrison
Preceded by Werner Jeanrond	Professor of Divinity at the University of Glasgow; 2013–2019	Succeeded by Garrick Allen
Preceded by David F. Ford	Bampton Lecturer; 2017	Succeeded by Peter Harrison
