= Lady Margaret Professor =

Lady Margaret Professor may refer to one of two theology professorships:

- Lady Margaret Professor of Divinity at the University of Oxford
- Lady Margaret's Professor of Divinity at the University of Cambridge
