= Peter Harrison (historian) =

Australian historian and philosopher

Peter Harrison FAHA
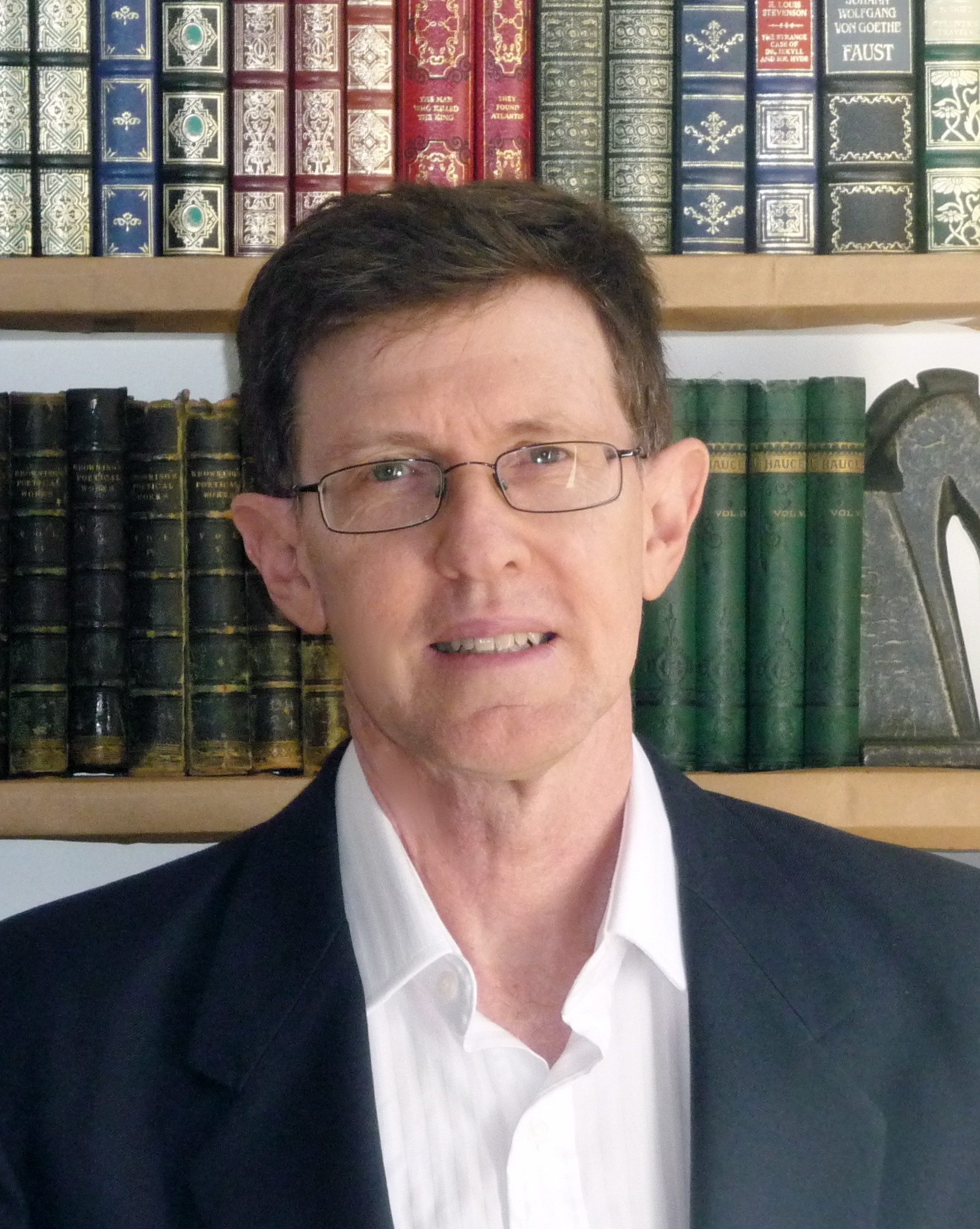
- Harrison in 2010
- Born: 29 November 1955 (age 70)

Academic background
- Education: University of Queensland; Yale University
- Thesis: "Religion" and the Religions in British Thought (1989)

Academic work
- Discipline: History
- Sub-discipline: Early-modern intellectual history; history of religion; history of science
- Institutions: Bond University; Harris Manchester College, Oxford; University of Queensland; University of Notre Dame, Australia
- Main interests: History of the relationship between religion and science

Peter D. Harrison FAHA (born 1955) is a Professorial Research Fellow at the University of Notre Dame, Australia, and Professor Emeritus of History and Philosophy at the University of Queensland.

== Career ==
Peter Harrison holds a DLitt from the University of Oxford, a PhD from the University of Queensland, and master's degrees from Yale and Oxford. He grew up in rural and regional Queensland, and attended Bundaberg State High School. His academic career began at Bond University on Australia's Gold Coast, where for a number of years he was professor of history and philosophy. From 2007 to 2011 he was the Andreas Idreos Professor of Science and Religion at the University of Oxford. During his time at Oxford, he was a fellow of Harris Manchester College and director of the Ian Ramsey Centre where he continues to hold a senior research fellowship. He became the inaugural director of the University of Queensland's Institute for Advanced Studies in the Humanities in July 2015, a position from which he retired in 2023. He has also held visiting fellowships or Professorships at Yale University, the Institute for Advanced Study, Princeton, the Centre of Theological Inquiry, Princeton, the University of Otago, and the University of Chicago. He is a fellow of the Australian Academy of the Humanities, a corresponding member of the International Academy of the History of Science, and a member of the International Society for Science and Religion. In 2003 he was awarded a Centenary Medal. He delivered the 2011 Gifford Lectures at the University of Edinburgh published as The Territories of Science and Religion and named winner of the 2015 Aldersgate Prize. In 2014 he was awarded an Australian Laureate Fellowship to conduct a five-year research project exploring science and secularization. He delivered the Bampton Lectures at the University of Oxford in February 2019. In 2023, he became Professor Emeritus of the University of Queensland and in that same year was appointed to a Professorial Research Fellowship at the University of Notre Dame, Australia.

== Writings ==
Harrison is best known for a number of influential writings on religion and the origins of modern science. He has argued that changing approaches to the interpretation of the Bible had a significant impact on the development of modern science. He has also suggested that the biblical story of the Fall played a key role in the development of experimental science. His earlier work traces changing conceptions of religion in the Western world. Harrison contends that the idea of religions as sets of beliefs and practices emerged for the first time in the 17th century. This earlier work on religion was revisited in his 2011 Gifford Lectures, where he argued that current conceptions of both "science" and "religion" are relatively recent Western inventions, and that contemporary relations between science and religion are to some extent already built into the categories themselves. Rethinking the relations between science and religion, on this account, is not a matter of considering relations between scientific and religious doctrines, but of rethinking the ways in which science and religion themselves are currently conceptualised.

Similarly, he also contends that the concept of Western values is a quite recent, 20th-century Western emergence, despite being traced back to classical antiquity and the New Testament. In 2017, Harrison demonstrated that the Credo quia absurdum was a quote misattributed to Tertullian in the early modern period as a part of anti-religious and anti-Catholic polemics.

His Bampton Lectures, published as ''Some New World'' (2024) offer a new genealogy of secular modernity. Part of the argument is that the idea of a natural/supernatural dichotomy is a distinctive and unique feature of Western secular thought. This historically contingent distinction, he proposes, might be a key premise of contemporary naturalism but is not, on most traditional understandings, requisite for religious commitment itself.

== Selected publications ==
- Some New World: Myths of Supernatural Belief in a Secular Age, Cambridge University Press, 2024. ISBN 978-1009477222
- After Science and Religion: Fresh Perspectives from Theology and Philosophy'. with John Milbank, Cambridge University Press, 2022. ISBN 1316517926.
- New Directions in Theology and Science: Beyond Dialogue. with Paul Tyson, Routledge, 2022. ISBN 1032073225.
- Science Without God? Rethinking the History of Scientific Naturalism. with Jon Roberts, Oxford University Press, 2019. ISBN 9780198834588.
- Narratives of Secularization. Routledge 2018. ISBN 978-1138563568.
- The Territories of Science and Religion. University of Chicago Press, 2015. ISBN 978-0226184487. The Gifford Lectures. Read an excerpt.
- Wrestling with Nature: From Omens to Science. with Ronald Numbers and Michael Shank University of Chicago Press, 2011. ISBN 978-0-226-31783-0.
- The Cambridge Companion to Science and Religion. Cambridge University Press, 2010. ISBN 978-0-521-71251-4.
- The Fall of Man and the Foundations of Science. Cambridge University Press, 2007. ISBN 0-521-87559-5.
- The Bible, Protestantism, and the Rise of Natural Science. Cambridge University Press, 1998. ISBN 0-521-00096-3.
- 'Religion' and the religions in the English Enlightenment. Cambridge University Press, 1990. ISBN 0-521-89293-7.

Academic offices
Preceded by John Hedley Brooke	Andreas Idreos Professor of Science and Religion; 2007–2011	Succeeded by Alister McGrath
Preceded by Patricia Churchland	Gifford Lecturer at the University of Edinburgh; 2011	Succeeded by Gordon Brown
Preceded by George Pattison	Bampton Lecturer; 2019	Succeeded by Jessica Martin
