= F. L. Cross =

English Anglican theologian (1900–1968)

The Reverend F. L. Cross FBA
- Born: Frank Leslie Cross; 22 January 1900; Honiton, England
- Died: 30 December 1968 (aged 68); Oxford, England
- Notable work: Oxford Dictionary of the Christian Church (1957)

Ecclesiastical career
- Religion: Christianity (Anglican)
- Church: Church of England

Academic background
- Education: Balliol College, Oxford; Keble College, Oxford
- Thesis: The Philosophy of Edmund Husserl and His School (1930)

Academic work
- Discipline: Theology
- Sub-discipline: Patristics
- School or tradition: High-church Anglicanism
- Institutions: Christ Church, Oxford

Frank Leslie Cross FBA (22 January 1900 – 30 December 1968), usually cited as F. L. Cross, was an English patristics scholar and Anglican priest. He was the founder of the Oxford International Conference on Patristic Studies and editor (with Elizabeth Livingstone) of The Oxford Dictionary of the Christian Church (first edition, 1957). He was Lady Margaret Professor of Divinity at the University of Oxford from 1944 to 1968.

== Life ==
Cross was born in Honiton on 22 January 1900 to the pharmacist Herbert Francis Cross and his wife Louisa Georgina. The family moved to Bournemouth whilst he was a child, where he won the Domus scholarship for natural science at Balliol College, Oxford, taking honours in chemistry and crystallography and then, in 1922, following tuition at Keble College, Oxford, first-class honours in theology. He studied in Marburg and Freiburg im Breisgau, taking a Doctor of Philosophy degree at Oxford in 1930 with a dissertation on Edmund Husserl. He became an ordinand of Ripon College Cuddesdon in 1923 and was ordained in 1925 as tutor and chaplain of that college. In 1927 he became one of the priest-librarians of Pusey House, Oxford, of which he became Custodian in 1934. He was appointed Lady Margaret Professor of Divinity and Canon of Christ Church, Oxford, in 1944, by which time his interest in patristics was developing, alongside the beginnings of The Oxford Dictionary of the Christian Church, which was published in 1957. At the time of his death he was working on the second edition.

Post-war he organised international conferences, initially to re-establish relations with Christians in Germany. He organized the First International Conference on Patristic Studies in 1951, the second in 1955 and served as editor of the first 11 volumes of Studia Patristica, the official publication of the conference. Additionally, he also organized New Testament congresses. As well as their academic importance, the conferences were an early expression of ecumenism.

Cross was awarded an Oxford Doctor of Divinity degree in 1950; he received honorary degrees from the University of Aberdeen and the University of Bonn and was elected a Fellow of the British Academy in 1967.

Cross died on 30 December 1968 in Oxford. Near the end of his life his two sisters became his caretakers.

== Selected works ==
- Cross, F. L.; Livingstone, E. A., eds. (1997). The Oxford Dictionary of the Christian Church (3rd ed.). Oxford: Oxford University Press. ISBN 978-0-19-211655-0.

Academic offices
Preceded by N. P. Williams	Lady Margaret Professor of Divinity; 1944–1968	Succeeded by John Macquarrie
