= Thomas Jenner (theologian) =

English academic

Thomas Jenner (1 February 1689, in Standish – 12 January 1768, in Oxford) was an English academic.

Jenner was educated at Magdalen College, Oxford, of which college he was a Fellow from 1715 to 1745. He was Lady Margaret Professor of Divinity at Oxford from 1728 and its President from 1745, holding both posts until his death.

Academic offices
Preceded by William Delaune	Lady Margaret Professor of Divinity; 1728–1768	Succeeded by Thomas Randolph
Preceded by Edward Butler	President of Magdalen College, Oxford; 1745–1768	Succeeded by John Oliver
