= Baby Varghese =

Indian theologian (1953-)

- Born: Baby Varghese
- Education: Paris-Sorbonne University (Ph.D), Catholic University of Paris (Th.D), École pratique des hautes études (Syriac Diploma)
- Occupations: Author; Professor; Scholar

Baby Varghese, born in India, is a Malankara Orthodox priest and a Church historian and scholar in Syriac Liturgical Theology.

== Education ==
After graduating from CMS College in Kottayam, Varghese joined Orthodox Theological Seminary in Kottayam. He earned his bachelor's degree in divinity from Serampore University with first class and first rank. In 1981, he earned his doctorate of theology from the Catholic University of Paris. Four years later he earned his Ph.D. in liturgical studies at the University of Paris - Sorbonne in 1985 Varghese has also earned a Syriac diploma from École pratique des hautes études.

== Career ==
Varghese is a professor of Theology at St. Thomas Orthodox Theological Seminary, Nagpur, a professor emeritus at Orthodox Theological Seminary, Kottayam, and a professor of Syriac studies at St. Ephrem Ecumenical Research Institute (SEERI). He is a research guide in Syriac studies at Mahatma Gandhi University. Baby Varghese is a priest of the Malankara Orthodox Syrian Church (Indian Orthodox Church) and serves in the Kottayam Orthodox diocese. He has written various books regarding West Syriac Christianity and translated many commentaries of the early Church fathers, Orthodox prayers, and sacraments of the Church.

=== Malankara Orthodox Syrian Church publications ===
There are numerous efforts performed by Baby Varghese in the field of translating books from Syriac to English. Under the authority of the Malankara Orthodox Church Publications (MOC Publications) and with the blessings of the MOC Publications President, Thomas Mar Athanasius, Varghese has translated the Order of the Prayers on Good Friday book, Prayers of the Great Lent, Prayers of the Holy Week, and the Promioun - Sedro of the Holy Week.

In the Promioun - Sedro of the Holy Week, Athanasius' preface message praised Varghese saying:

Our note cannot be concluded without appreciating the opulent work of Fr. Dr. Baby Varghese who became instrumental in the hands of Almighty in providing this work to the Church. His lucid and clear translation of the text from its original is opening a new door before us. We are indeed contented that his maestro in the area has been useful for the Church in producing this genre of valuable literatures. May God bless him for all his great efforts.

=== Malankara Orthodox Syrian delegation ===
In 2009, Varghese participated in the Joint Commission for Dialogue between the Catholic Church and the Malankara Orthodox Syrian Church. The delegation of the Malankara Church consisted of: Metropolitan Gabriel Mar Gregorios (co-chair), Metropolitan Thomas Mar Athanasius; Baby Varghese; Johns Abraham Konat; Sabu Kuriakose; Abraham Thomas; Fr. O. Thomas and John Mathews (co-secretary).

Varghese presented some reflections on the Anointing of the Sick and its administration to those outside the Orthodox belief.

== Awards ==
Varghese is a recipient of the:

- Alexander Von Humboldt Fellowship (Free University in Berlin)
- Burke Fellowship (Union Theological Seminary)
- ISM Fellowship and Visiting Professor (Yale University)

== Works ==
Baby Varghese has published books, commentaries and translation through SEERI and Gorgias Press. Some of his more popular works are included below.

- Varghese, B. (1989). Les onctions baptismales dans la tradition syrienne. Belgium: Universitatis Catholicae Americae.
- Varghese, B. (2004). West Syrian Liturgical Theology. United Kingdom: Ashgate.
- Varghese, B. (2009). The Syriac Version of the Liturgy of St James: A Brief History for Students. United States: Gorgias Press, LLC.
- The Commentary of Dionysius Bar Salibi on the Eucharist. (2011). United States: Gorgias Press, LLC.
- Varghese, B. (2012). Baptism and Chrismation in the Syriac Tradition. United States: Gorgias Press LLC.
- The Commentary of John of Dara on the Eucharist (Moran Etho).
- Varghese, B. (2020). George, Bishop of the Arabs: Homily on the Consecration of Myron: Gorgias Press, LLC.
