= Walter Lock =

English Anglican priest and theologian

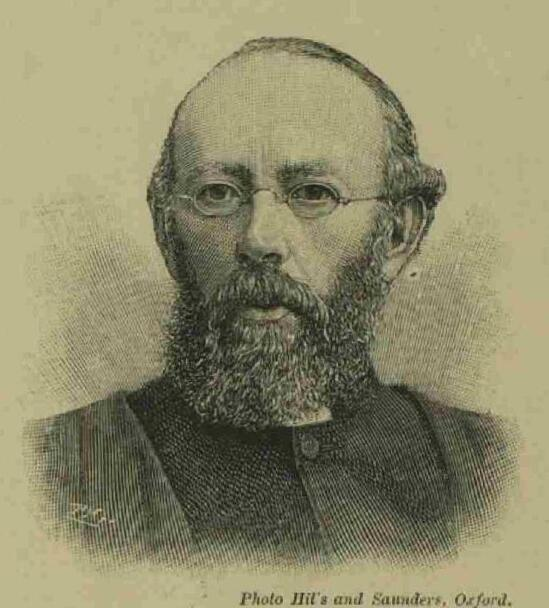
- Born: 14 July 1846
- Died: 12 August 1933 (aged 87)

Walter Lock (1846–1933) was an English Anglican priest and theologian, who served as Warden of Keble College, Oxford, from 1897 to 1920.

== Life ==
Walter Lock was born on 14 July 1846. He was educated at Dorchester Grammar School and Marlborough College, before studying at Corpus Christi College, Oxford, with a scholarship. He was appointed a Fellow of Magdalen College, Oxford, in 1869, and was a tutor at Keble College, Oxford, from 1870 to 1880. He became Sub-Warden of Keble in 1880 and Warden in 1897, holding this latter post until 1920. He was Dean Ireland's Professor of Exegesis of Holy Scripture at Oxford University between 1895 and 1919, and Lady Margaret Professor of Divinity (a position that carried with it an appointment as a canon of Christ Church, Oxford) from 1919 to 1927. He became an Emeritus Professor in 1928. He was appointed an Honorary Fellow of Magdalen in 1897, and of Corpus Christi in 1920. He died on 12 August 1933.

His publications include some of his sermons, a biography of John Keble, and works on the Bible.

Academic offices
Preceded by William Sanday	Dean Ireland's Professor of the Exegesis of Holy Scripture; 1895–1919	Succeeded by Cuthbert Turner
Preceded by William Sanday	Lady Margaret Professor of Divinity; 1919–1927	Succeeded by N. P. Williams
