= Frank Griffel =

Professor of Islamic studies

Frank Griffel is a German scholar of Islamic studies. He is the Professor in the Study of Abrahamic Religions at the Faculty of Theology and Religion at the University of Oxford and Fellow at Lady Margaret Hall. Until 2024, he was the Louis M. Rabinowitz Professor of Religious Studies at Yale University, where he is still an emeritus professor.

== Biography ==
Griffel earned his PhD in 1999 from the Free University of Berlin, Germany, after studying philosophy, Arabic literature, and Islamic studies at the University of Göttingen, Damascus University, and the Free University of Berlin. From 1999 to 2000, he was a research fellow at the Orient Institute of the Deutsche Morgenländische Gesellschaft (German Oriental Society) in Beirut, Lebanon. He joined Yale University in 2000 as an assistant professor, where he taught Islamic intellectual history, ancient and modern theology and philosophy, and how Islamic intellectuals respond to Western modernity. In 2008, he was promoted to full professor at Yale, and in 2021 named Louis M. Rabinowitz Professor of Religious Studies. At Yale, he chaired the Religious Studies Department from 2020 to 2024 and was chair of the Council of Middle Eastern Studies (CMES) 2011–2017. From 2003 to 2004, he was a member of the Institute for Advanced Study at Princeton. He was visiting professor at LMU Munich and the University of Göttingen, Germany. In 2024, he was appointed the third Professor of the Study of the Abrahamic Religions at Oxford.

== On al-Ghazālī (d. 1111) ==
Griffel’s first monograph study, which is based on his dissertation, is a history of the judgement of apostasy (irtidād) in Islamic law up to al-Ghazālī. In a famous fatwa at the end of his book Tahāfut al-falāsifa, al-Ghazālī declared that all Muslims who teach three positions that stem from the philosophical system of Ibn Sīnā (Avicenna) were apostates from Islam who can be killed. In his Apostasie und Toleranz im Islam (in German), Griffel studies the legal and theological preconditions and assumptions (“Voraussetzungen”) of this fatwā and adds a part where he looks at the reactions to this it in subsequent philosophical literature from the Islamic west (Ibn Bājja, Ibn Ṭufayl and Ibn Rushd/Averroes).

Griffel’s second monograph Al-Ghazālī’s Philosophical Theology (2009) was triggered by the dispute between Michael E. Marmura and Richard M. Frank (1927–2009) on al-Ghazālī’s cosmology. Up to the mid-1980s, al-Ghazālī was considered a mainstream Ashʿarite theologian with some odd and idiosyncratic teachings. In several books and articles, published between 1987 and 1994, Frank argued that al-Ghazālī was in reality a follower of Ibn Sīnā’s Aristotelian cosmology who hid his opposition to Ashʿarite theology behind a smokescreen of confusing statements that seemed to support Ashʿarism. Marmura rejected Frank’s findings and, although admitting that he expressed himself sometimes in confusing language, maintained that al-Ghazālī was a faithful Ashʿarite theologian, who taught an occasionalist cosmology in all of his works. Griffel describes Al-Ghazālī’s Philosophical Theology, “as a fitting example of what G.W. Hegel called a dialectical progression. While Frank’s and Marmura’s works are the thesis and the anti-thesis (or the other way round), this book wishes to be considered a synthesis.” For Griffel, al-Ghazālī was both an occasionalist and a follower of Ibn Sīnā in his cosmology of secondary causation. In some books he teaches an occasionalist cosmology, in others secondary causality, following the Aristotelian model. Early on in his oeuvre (in the 17th discussion of his Tahāfut al-falāsifa), al-Ghazālī decided that both cosmologies offer equally convincing explanations of how God creates. Neither revelation nor reason offers insights into how God interacts with His creation, either by means of occasionalist direct creation or through secondary causes.

== On the History of Philosophy in Islam ==
The Formation of Post-Classical Philosophy in Islam (2021) is a detailed study of the conditions for and the content of philosophical activity in the Islamic east during the 12th century, the century after al-Ghazālī’s death. Griffel stresses that in Islam there was no decline of the rational sciences and of philosophy after al-Ghazālī. The history of philosophy in Islam, however, followed different patterns and different strategies than philosophy in the West. Philosophy in Islam developed more gradually than in Europe, where fundamental conceptions were periodically revised and sometimes discarded in “scientific revolutions.” In pre-modern Islam there was a tendency toward syncretism. Different elements subsisted side by side, to the extent that during Islam’s post-classical period (after 1150) expressions of Islamic theology (kalām), of Aristotelian philosophy (falsafa or ḥikma), and Sufism would appear within one and the same thinker. Griffel interprets this as a particular kind of reaction to a philosophical impasse that in the West led to Immanuel Kant’s “antinomies of pure reason.”

== On the meaning of “Salafi” ==
In 2015–16, Griffel engaged in a debate with Henri Lauzière about the proper understanding of the label “salafi.” Intellectual historians of Islam use this term to describe two groups of thinkers and activists. First, a group of reformers, active in the late 19th and early 20th centuries, whose most influential members were Jamal al-Din al-Afghani, Muhammad Abduh and Rashid Rida. Then, second, a group of contemporary Sunni activists who often reject any affiliation with the four schools of law (referred to as an attitude of “lā madhhabiyya”) and who try to establish norms of correct Islamic behavior and action by direct recourse to the sources on the Prophet Muhammad’s life, most importantly by an independent study of the hadith corpus. In a 2010 article and in his subsequent 2016-book, Lauzière argues that the conflation of these two groups in one (analytical) label is a mistake, for which the French scholar of Islamic studies Louis Massignon is responsible. Starting in 1919 he identified al-Afghānī and ʿAbduh as leaders of the salafiyya. These two, however, never used that word and have no connection to the contemporary movement of Salafiyya, whose members reject any affiliation with them. To this, Griffel responded in 2015 that the modern usage of the Arabic word “salafiyya” indeed only starts in the first decade of the 20th century among a group of ʿAbduh’s students and that neither al-Afghānī nor ʿAbduh themselves used the term. Still, Massignon was right, Griffel argues, because both employ a strategy of reforming Islam where they aim to go back in history to an age of “al-salaf al-ṣāliḥ” (“the pious forefathers”) that was unaffected by the intellectual decline they identified with the Islamic era that immediately preceded colonial defeat. For early Salafis such as ʿAbduh, that era could include any Muslim thinker from before ca. 1200 CE. The contemporary movement that today claims the label “salafiyya” grew out of a group of Rashid Rida’s students in the 1930s. For them, “al-salaf al-ṣāliḥ” is a much smaller group, mostly limited to the Prophet Muḥammad’s companions. Both the modernizers of the late 19th century and the contemporary Salafis, however, employ the same intellectual and political strategy. They wish to go back to sources that pre-date Islam’s post-classical era, which is associated with the onset of Western hegemony. Lauzière responded to Griffel’s article, to which Griffel also wrote a response, arguing that the modern Salafis’ rejection of any kind of affiliation with ʿAbduh and his movement is not a decisive criterium and that “the historian’s task is to develop analytical criteria of what we mean by [words such as “salafī”] and what kind of activism falls under than umbrella.”

== Recognition ==
Griffel was a Carnegie Scholar in 2007 and received a Friedrich Wilhelm Bessel-Research Award of the Humboldt Foundation in 2015. In 2021, he received the annual award of the German “Wissenschaftliche Gesellschaft für Islamische Theologie” (WGIT). His Al-Ghazālī’s Philosophical Theology received the World Prize for the Book of the Year of the Islamic Republic Iran in 2011, and his Formation of Post-Classical Philosophy in Islam the Sheikh Zayed Book Award in 2024 in the category “Arab Culture in Other Languages.”

== Selected works ==
- Apostasie und Toleranz im Islam. Die Entwicklung zu al-Ġazālīs Urteil gegen die Philosophie und die Reaktionen der Philosophen. Leiden: Brill, 2000.
- Al-Ghazali's Philosophical Theology, New York: Oxford University Press, 2009.
- The Formation of Post-Classical Philosophy in Islam. New York: Oxford University Press, 2021.
