= Anna Abulafia =

British scholar of religious history

Professor Anna Abulafia FBA, FRHistS
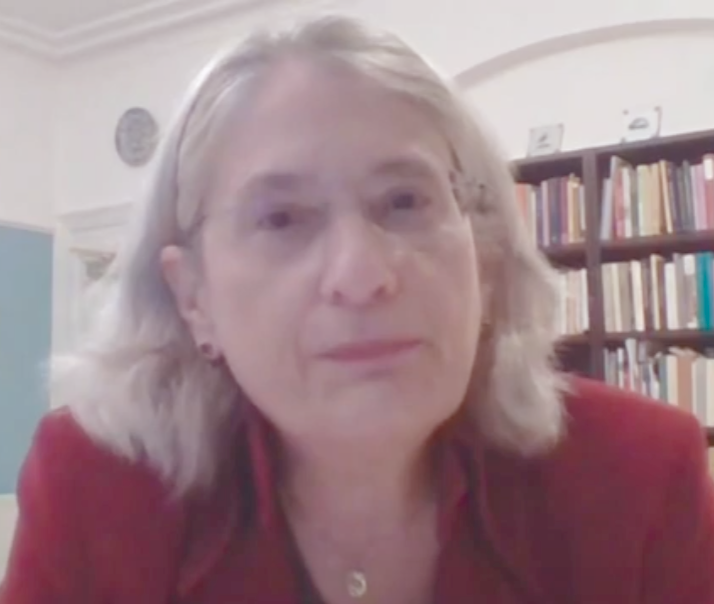
- In an online discussion in 2020
- Born: Anna Brechta Sapir; 8 May 1952 (age 74)
- Title: Professor of the Study of the Abrahamic Religions
- Spouse: David Abulafia (m. 1979; died 2026)
- Children: 2

Academic background
- Education: University of Amsterdam

Academic work
- Discipline: History
- Sub-discipline: History of religions; Relations between Jews and Christians; History of the Jews in the Middle Ages
- Institutions: Clare Hall, Cambridge; Lucy Cavendish College, Cambridge; Newnham College, Cambridge; Lady Margaret Hall, Oxford

Anna Brechta Sapir Abulafia, FBA, FRHistS (born 8 May 1952) is a British academic who specialises in religious history, with a focus on mediaeval Christian-Jewish relations in the twelfth and thirteenth-century centuries.

== Early life and education ==
Born in New York in 1952, Sapir moved with her family to the Netherlands in 1967, where she completed her schooling. She studied history at the University of Amsterdam, earning a doctorate in 1978.

Sapir was awarded the degree of Doctor of Theology (in church history) from the University of Amsterdam in 1984, and the degree of Doctor of Letters from the University of Cambridge in 2014.

== Academic career ==
In 1979 Sapir was a research assistant in medieval history at the University of Amsterdam before moving to the United Kingdom that year. She was a research fellow at Clare Hall, Cambridge, from 1981 to 1986 and the Laura Ashley Research Fellow at Lucy Cavendish College, Cambridge, from 1987 to 1990. From 1990 to 2015 she served in various roles as a fellow, college lecturer and director of studies at Lucy Cavendish College, including as graduate tutor (1992–1996), senior tutor (1996–2002) and vice-president (2002–2010).

From 2013 to 2015 Sapir was an affiliated college lecturer and director of studies at Newnham College, Cambridge and in 2015 was appointed as Professor of the Study of the Abrahamic Religions in the Faculty of Theology and Religion at the University of Oxford, where she became a fellow of Lady Margaret Hall. In 2022 she retired as Professor of the Study of the Abrahamic Religions.

In 2020 Sapir was elected a Fellow of the British Academy.

== Personal life ==
In 1979 Sapir married the historian David Abulafia (1949−2026), with whom she had two daughters.

== Selected publications ==
- Christians and Jews in the Twelfth-Century Renaissance, Routledge, 1995; paperback, 2014.
- Christians and Jews in Dispute. Disputational Literature and the Rise of Anti-Judaism in the West (c. 1000–1150), 1998.
- Religious Violence between Christians and Jews: Medieval Roots, Modern Perspectives, Palgrave Macmillan, 2002. (editor)
- Christian-Jewish Relations, 1000–1300. Jews in the Service of Medieval Christendom, Routledge, 2011. (Medieval World Series)
