= St. Ephrem Ecumenical Research Institute =

Indian research institute

- Other name: SEERI
- Motto: India's advanced teaching and learning centre for Syriac language and heritage
- Type: Research Institute
- Established: 1985
- Parent institution: Mahatma Gandhi University, Kerala
- Affiliations: Mahatma Gandhi University, Kerala
- President: Thomas Mor Koorilos, Archbishop of Tiruvalla.
- Director: Dr. Jacob Thekeparampil
- Location: Baker Hill, Kottayam, Kerala, 686002, India
- Language: Syriac, English, French, German, Italian, Armenian, Greek, Coptic, Ge’ez, Latin
- Website: seeri.org//

St. Ephrem Ecumenical Research Institute (SEERI) is a centre for Syriac studies located in Kottayam, Kerala. It is a research centre of the Mahatma Gandhi University, Kottayam.

== History ==
Named after the Syriac saint, Ephrem the Syrian, SEERI was inaugurated on 14 September 1985 by Marthoma Mathews I, Catholicos of the Malankara Orthodox Syrian Church. It works in collaboration with various churches that share the Syriac patrimony to foster ecumenism and deepen the mutual understanding of these churches in the study and search of their common heritage. It is sponsored and supported by the Archeparchy of Tiruvalla of the Syro-Malankara Catholic Church.

SEERI was developed to be a place for the advanced teaching and learning of the Syriac language and heritage in India, as well as making available manuscripts, documents, and source books necessary for such study and research.

SEERI's first doctoral dissertation, The History of the Assyrian Church of the East in the Twentieth Century, was completed by Mar Aprem Mooken in 2000.

== Affiliations ==
SEERI is a research center of the Mahatma Gandhi and affiliated with the Catholic University of America.

== Administration ==
=== Presidents and director ===
The President is Thomas Mor Koorilos, Metropolitan Archbishop of Tiruvalla.

The Director is Jacob Thekkeparambil.

=== Notable faculty ===
- Rev. Dr. Baby Varghese
- Rev. Dr. Jacob Thekeparampil (Director)
- Rev. Fr. John Kannanthanam
- Rev. Dr. Johns Abraham Konat
- Dr. Kuriakose Valavanolickal
- Rev. Fr. Kuriakose Moolayil Corepiscopa
- Rev. Fr. Mathew Kuttiani
- Rev. Fr. Raju Parakkott (Asst. Director)
- Rev. Dr. Sebastian Naduthadom
- Rev. Dr. Stephen Plathottathil OIC
- Rev. Dr. Thomas Koonammakkal (Dean of Studies)
- Rev. Fr. Varghese Varghese, Kaloor

== Publications ==
- The HARP: (English periodical) A review of Syriac, Ecumenical and Oriental Studies. Contains articles of renowned writers from all over the world.
- MŌRĀN ETH'Ō (Monographs - occasional English publications)
- S.C.C: (SEERI Correspondence Course in English on Syrian Christian heritage. Complete set includes 12 books. The course is to be completed in two years. 9 books have already been published).
- Blue Series: German translations of Syriac Liturgical text.
- Madrōsō (Malayalam)
- Nuhro (Malayalam)
- AWSĀR SLAWŌT'O (translations from Syriac to English)
