= Edward Cradock =

English theologian and alchemist

Edward Cradock (floruit 1571) was an English theologian and alchemist.

== Biography ==
A native of Staffordshire, he was educated at Christ Church, Oxford, where he graduated B.A. 11 January 1556 and M.A. 10 February 1559. He was elected Lady Margaret professor on 24 October 1565, and later in the same year took both the degrees in divinity. He resigned his professorship in 1594. Anthony Wood said that Cradock "addicted himself much to chymistry" and "spent many years in obtaining the Elixir, alias the Philosophers stone, and was accounted one of the number of those whom we now call Rosycrucians".

He was a friend of John Dee who recorded a three-day visit to him in Oxford in 1581.

== Works ==
In 1571 he published The Shippe of assured Safetie, wherein we may sayle without Danger towards the Land of the Living, promised to the true Israelites, 2nd edition 1572. Some Latin sapphics by Cradock are prefixed to Robert Peterson's translation of Giovanni della Casa's Il Galateo, 1576.

He wrote several alchemical works, left in the Ashmolean manuscripts:

- A Treatise of the Philosopher's Stone, written in English verse and dedicated to Queen Elizabeth.
- Tractatus de Lapide Philosophico (Ashmolean MS. 1415), written in Latin verse and dedicated to Queen Elizabeth.
- Documentum et Practica (Ashmolean MS. 1408).
