= John Webster (theologian) =

English Anglican priest (1955–2016)

The Reverend John Webster FRSE
- Born: John Bainbridge Webster; 20 June 1955; Mansfield, England
- Died: 25 May 2016 (aged 60); Aberdeen, Scotland
- Other name: J. B. Webster

Ecclesiastical career
- Religion: Christianity (Anglican)
- Church: Church of England; Anglican Church of Canada
- Ordained: 1984

Academic background
- Education: Clare College, Cambridge
- Thesis: Distinguishing Between God and Man (1982)
- Doctoral advisor: George Newlands
- Influences: Karl Barth; Eberhard Jüngel

Academic work
- Discipline: Theology
- Sub-discipline: Systematic theology; historical theology; moral theology
- Institutions: St John's College, Durham; Wycliffe College, Toronto; Christ Church, Oxford; University of Aberdeen; University of St Andrews
- Doctoral students: Richard Topping
- Influenced: Michael Allen

John Bainbridge Webster FRSE (20 June 1955 – 25 May 2016) was an Anglican priest and theologian writing in the area of systematic, historical, and moral theology. Born in Mansfield, England, on 20 June 1955, he was educated at the independent Bradford Grammar School and at the University of Cambridge. After a distinguished career, he died at his home in Scotland on 25 May 2016 at the age of 60. At the time of his death, he was the Chair of Divinity at St. Mary's College, University of St Andrews, Scotland.

== Career ==
Webster began his career as a chaplain and tutor at St John's College, Durham University (1982–86) and went on to teach systematic theology at Wycliffe College at the University of Toronto – one of the seven colleges that comprise the Toronto School of Theology (1986–1996) – before becoming the Lady Margaret Professor of Divinity at the University of Oxford, a prestigious chair in which he was immediately preceded by Rowan Williams who later became Archbishop of Wales (1999–2002) and then Canterbury (2002–2012). During Webster's seven-year tenure at Oxford (1996–2003), he also served as a canon of Christ Church. In 2003, he was installed in the Chair of Systematic Theology at King's College, University of Aberdeen, Scotland. In Summer 2013, he became Chair of Divinity at the University of St Andrews. He was elected a Fellow of the Royal Society of Edinburgh in 2005.

Together with Colin Gunton (1940–2003), Webster co-founded the International Journal of Systematic Theology. He was also a member of the editorial boards of the International Journal for the Study of the Christian Church and of the Scottish Journal of Theology Monographs. He was the series editor of The Great Theologians, Barth Studies for Ashgate, and co-editor for the Oxford Handbook of Systematic Theology (2007).

== Theological commorancy ==
His PhD thesis was on the German Lutheran systematic and philosophical theologian Eberhard Jüngel: Distinguishing Between God and Man: Aspects of the Theology of Eberhard Jüngel (1982). Subsequently, Webster's translations and theological interaction with Jüngel are largely responsible for introducing him to the English speaking academy. Through study of Jüngel, Webster became well acquainted with the theology of Karl Barth whom he has written on extensively and developed a unique account of, which stresses the significant role of biblical interpretation and the Reformed tradition in Barth's work. Jüngel and Barth present important influences on Webster's own constructive dogmatic work, which offers that the most reliable articulation of Christian truth is that made in shared attention with the Reformation's renewal of Chalcedonian Christianity and guided by the perfect and free God who makes himself the proper object of extended paraphrase by his active self-presentation in Jesus Christ through the power of the Holy Spirit.

In September 2007, Webster delivered the inaugural lectures of the Kantzer Lectures in Revealed Theology moderated by Kevin Vanhoozer through the Carl F. H. Henry Center for Theological Understanding at Trinity Evangelical Divinity School in Deerfield, Illinois.

== Selected works ==
=== Thesis ===
- Webster, John B. (1982). Distinguishing Between God and Man: Aspects of the Theology of Eberhard Jüngel (PhD). University of Cambridge.

=== Translations or works on Eberhard Jüngel ===
- Webster, John B. (1986). Eberhard Jüngel: An Introduction to His Theology (1st ed.). Cambridge: Cambridge University Press. ISBN 978-0-521-30708-6.
- Jüngel, Eberhard (1989). Theological Essays I. Translated by Webster, John B. (2nd ed.). London: T & T Clark. ISBN 978-0-567-09502-2.
- Jüngel, Eberhard (1995). Webster, John B. (ed.). Theological Essays II. Translated by Neufeldt-Fast, Arnold; Webster, John B. Edinburgh: T & T Clark. ISBN 978-0-567-09706-4.
- Jüngel, Eberhard (2001). God's Being Is in Becoming: The Trinitarian Being of God in the Theology of Karl Barth. Translated by Webster, John B. London: T & T Clark. ISBN 978-0-567-08706-5.
- ———, ed. (1994). Possibilities of Theology: Studies in the Theology of Eberhard Jüngel in his 60th Year. Edinburgh: T & T Clark. ISBN 978-0-567-09720-0.

=== Works on Karl Barth ===
- ——— (1995). Barth's Ethics of Reconciliation. Cambridge: Cambridge University Press. ISBN 978-0-521-04411-0.
- ——— (1998). Barth's Moral Theology: Human Action in Barth's Thought. Edinburgh: T & T Clark.
- ———, ed. (2000). The Cambridge Companion to Karl Barth. Cambridge companions to religion. Cambridge: Cambridge University Press. ISBN 978-0-521-58476-0.
- ——— (2004). Karl Barth. Outstanding Christian Thinkers (2nd ed.). London: T & T Clark. ISBN 978-0-8264-5078-4.
- ——— (2004). Barth's Early Theology. London: T & T Clark.
- ——— (2005). Barth's Earlier Theology: Four Studies. London: T & T Clark. ISBN 978-0-567-08352-4.
- ———; Yuen, Alfred H. (2014). Barth's theological ontology of Holy Scripture. Princeton theological monograph series. Vol. 211. Eugene, OR: Pickwick Publications. ISBN 978-1-620-32911-5.

=== Constructive works ===
- ——— (2001). Word and Church: Essays in Church Dogmatics. London: T & T Clark. ISBN 978-0-567-03066-5.
- ——— (2003). Holiness. Grand Rapids, MI: Eerdmans. ISBN 978-0-802-82215-4.
- ——— (2003). Holy Scripture: A Dogmatic Sketch. Current issues in theology. Vol. 1. Cambridge: Cambridge University Press. ISBN 978-0-521-83118-5.
- ——— (2005). Confessing God: Essays in Christian Dogmatics II. London: T & T Clark. ISBN 978-0-567-08377-7.
- ——— (2010). Holiness (2nd ed.). London: SCM Press. ISBN 978-0-334-02895-6.
- ——— (2012). The Domain of the Word of God: Scripture and Theological Reason. T & T Clark theology. London: T & T Clark. ISBN 978-0-567-212948.
- ——— (2015). God Without Measure: Essays in Christian Doctrine - Volume 1 (God and the Works of God). London: T & T Clark. ISBN 978-0-5671-6513-8.

=== Exhortative works ===
- ——— (2011). The Grace of Truth. Farmington Hills, MI: Oil Lamp Books.

=== Other ===
- ———; Schner, George P. (2000). Theology after Liberalism: a reader. Blackwell readings in modern theology. Oxford; Malden, MA: Blackwell Publishing. ISBN 978-0-6312-0563-0.
- ———, ed. (2007). The Oxford Handbook of Systematic Theology. Oxford Handbooks. Oxford; New York: Oxford University Press. ISBN 978-0-199-24576-5.

=== Articles ===
- ——— (2004). "The Holiness and Love of God". Scottish Journal of Theology. 57 (3): 249–68. doi:10.1017/S0036930604000250. S2CID 170521304.
- ——— (2004). "On Evangelical Ecclesiology". Ecclesiology. 1: 9–35. doi:10.1177/174413660400100101.
- ——— (2008). "Biblical Reasoning". Anglican Theological Review. 90: 733–51.
- ——— (2009). "Principles of Systematic Theology". International Journal of Systematic Theology. 11: 56–71. doi:10.1111/j.1468-2400.2008.00423.x.
- ——— (2010). "Trinity and Creation". International Journal of Systematic Theology. 12: 4–19. doi:10.1111/j.1468-2400.2009.00489.x.
- ——— (2015). "Sins of Speech". Studies in Christian Ethics. 28: 35–48. doi:10.1177/0953946814555323. S2CID 146919183.
- ——— (2015). "What Makes Theology Theological?" (PDF). Journal of Analytic Theology. 3: 17–28. doi:10.12978/jat.2015-3.091413220417. S2CID 170568964. Archived from the original (PDF) on 7 February 2020.

Academic offices
Preceded by Rowan Williams	Lady Margaret Professor of Divinity; 1996–2003	Succeeded by George Pattison
