= Timothy Neve =

English churchman and academic

Timothy Neve (1724–1798) was an English churchman and academic.

== Life ==
He was born at Spalding, Lincolnshire, on 12 October 1724, the only surviving son, by his first wife, of Timothy Neve the antiquary. He was admitted at Corpus Christi College, Oxford on 27 October 1737, at the age of thirteen, and was elected scholar in 1737 and fellow in 1747. He graduated B.A. 1741, M.A. 1744, B.D. 1753, and D.D. 1758.

In 1759 he was one of the preachers at the Chapel Royal, Whitehall, and on 23 April in that year he was instituted, on the nomination of John Green, bishop of Lincoln, to the rectory of Middleton Stoney, Oxfordshire, which he resigned in 1792 in favour of his son, the Rev. Egerton Robert Neve (1766–1818). In 1762 he was appointed by his college to the rectory of Letcomb-Bassett, Berkshire, but he vacated it two years later, on his preferment to the rectory of Godington, Oxfordshire, which he kept for the rest of his life.

From 1783 to his death in 1798 Neve held the Lady Margaret professorship of divinity at Oxford and the sixth prebendal stall in Worcester Cathedral. He was also chaplain of Merton College, Oxford, and the second Bampton lecturer. He was partly paralysed for several years before his death, which took place at Oxford on 1 January 1798. He left a wife, three sons, and two daughters.

== Works ==
Neve's chief works were:

- Animadversions upon Mr. Phillips's History of the Life of Cardinal Pole, 1766, against Thomas Phillips; some of the criticisms of Neve were expressed in very strong terms, and Phillips replied in the third edition (pp. 248 et seq.) of his Study of Sacred Literature, to which is added an Answer to the Principal Objections to the History of the Life of Cardinal Pole.
- Eight Sermons [ 250 ] preached before University of Oxford in 1781 as Bampton Lecturer, 1781.
- Seventeen Sermons on Various Subjects, 1798. A posthumous work, published for the benefit of his family.

Six letters addressed to him by Maurice Johnson on antiquarian topics were printed in the Bibliotheca Topographica Britannica, iii. 417-35. Neve was elected in April 1746 a fellow of the Literary Society at Spalding, and became its correspondent at Oxford.
