= Professor of the Study of the Abrahamic Religions =

Professorship at the University of Oxford

The Chair of the Study of the Abrahamic Religions was created at the University of Oxford in 2008. The holder of the position is a member of the Faculty of Theology and Religion at the university and a Fellow of Lady Margaret Hall, Oxford. The role of the professor is to "[strengthen] Oxford's research and teaching in the Study of Religion, with particular reference to the three Abrahamic religions of Judaism, Christianity, and Islam."

== List of Professors of the Study of the Abrahamic Religions ==
- 2009–2013: Guy Stroumsa
- 2015–2022: Anna Abulafia
- 2024–present: Frank Griffel
