= Elizabeth Livingstone =

English Anglican theologian (1929–2023)

Elizabeth Livingstone MBE
- Born: Elizabeth Anne Livingstone; 7 July 1929
- Died: 1 January 2023 (aged 93); Iffley, United Kingdom
- Other name: E. A. Livingstone

Academic background
- Education: University of Oxford

Academic work
- Discipline: Theology
- Sub-discipline: Patristics
- School or tradition: Anglicanism

Elizabeth Anne Livingstone MBE (7 July 1929 – 1 January 2023), also known as E. A. Livingstone, was an English Anglican theologian, who specialised in patristics.

== Life ==
=== Education ===
Livingstone held a Master of Arts degree from the University of Oxford and a Lambeth Doctorate of Divinity.

=== Academic work ===
Livingstone was co-editor with Frank Leslie Cross of the first edition of The Oxford Dictionary of the Christian Church in 1957 and continued as editor of later editions after Cross's death in 1968. She is also the editor of The Concise Oxford Dictionary of the Christian Church.

Following Cross's death, Livingstone, previously his assistant, organised the Oxford International Conferences on Patristic Studies from 1969 to 1995, and also edited the record of the proceedings published as Studia Patristica. She was originally assigned a committee of 26 scholars to assist her in the editorial work, but her work was so effective that by the next edition, only 20 scholars remained. In subsequent conferences, no mention is made of editorial assistants.

=== Personal life and death ===
Elizabeth Livingstone died on 1 January 2023, at the age of 93.

== Honours ==
In the 1986 New Year Honours, Livingstone was appointed a Member of the Order of the British Empire for "services to Patristic Studies". She was one of four people to be awarded the President's Medal of the British Academy in 2015.

Livingstone was an Honorary Fellow of St Stephen's House, Oxford.

== Selected works ==
- Cross, F. L.; Livingstone, E. A., eds. (1997). The Oxford Dictionary of the Christian Church (3rd ed.). Oxford: Oxford University Press. ISBN 978-0192116550.
