= John Macquarrie =

British Anglican priest and philosopher (1919–2007)

The Reverend John Macquarrie TD FBA
- John Macquarrie in 1991
- Born: 27 June 1919; Renfrew, Scotland
- Died: 28 May 2007 (aged 87); Oxford, England
- Spouse: Jenny Fallow (née Welsh)

Ecclesiastical career
- Religion: Christianity (Presbyterian · Anglican)
- Church: Church of Scotland; Episcopal Church (United States); Church of England
- Ordained: 1945 (Presbyterian); 1965 (Anglican deacon and priest)

Academic background
- Education: University of Glasgow
- Doctoral advisor: Ian Henderson
- Influences: Martin Heidegger

Academic work
- Discipline: Theology
- Sub-discipline: Systematic theology
- School or tradition: Existentialism
- Institutions: University of Glasgow; Union Theological Seminary; Christ Church, Oxford
- Notable students: Stephen Palmquist

John Macquarrie TD FBA (1919–2007) was a Scottish-born theologian, philosopher and Anglican priest. He was the author of Principles of Christian Theology (1966) and Jesus Christ in Modern Thought (1991). Timothy Bradshaw, writing in the Handbook of Anglican Theologians, described Macquarrie as "unquestionably Anglicanism's most distinguished systematic theologian in the second half of the 20th century."

== Life and career ==
Macquarrie was born on 27 June 1919 in Renfrew, into a devout Presbyterian family. His father was an elder in the Church of Scotland with strong Gaelic roots. Macquarrie was educated at Paisley Grammar School before studying philosophy at the University of Glasgow under the distinguished scholar Charles Arthur Campbell (MA 1940) and obtained a degree in theology (BD 1943).

Macquarrie enlisted in the British Army and served from 1943 to 1948. He was ordained as a Presbyterian minister in the Church of Scotland in 1945 and then served in the Royal Army Chaplains Department (1945–1948). After demobilization he served as a parish minister in the Church of Scotland at St Ninian's Church, Brechin (1948–1953).

Macquarrie returned to the University of Glasgow to study for a PhD, which he was awarded in 1954 while serving as lecturer in systematic theology at Trinity College, Glasgow. His supervisor was Ian Henderson who, despite having been a pupil of Karl Barth at Basle, was theologically more closely aligned with his disputant, Rudolf Bultmann.

In 1962 Macquarrie was appointed Professor of Systematic Theology at Union Theological Seminary, New York City. During his time in the United States Macquarrie became a member of the Episcopal Church, part of the Anglican Communion. While in Scotland, he had long been attracted to the Anglican church there, but in deference to his family's feelings and their strong Presbyterian roots, he maintained his membership in the Presbyterian Church of Scotland. His involvement in the Episcopal Church in the United States eventually led him to be ordained priest by the Bishop of New York on 16 June 1965. On the next day (the Feast of Corpus Christi) he celebrated his first Eucharist at the Church of St Mary the Virgin in New York City.

He was Lady Margaret Professor of Divinity in the University of Oxford and a canon residentiary of Christ Church, Oxford, from 1970 until 1986. On retirement he continued to live in Oxford and was appointed a professor emeritus and a canon emeritus. From 1996 he had been the Martin Heidegger Professor of Philosophical Theology at the Graduate Theological Foundation in the United States.

Macquarrie was awarded the Territorial Decoration in 1962. In 1964 the University of Glasgow conferred the degree of Doctor of Letters on him and in 1969 the university awarded him the degree of Doctor of Divinity honoris causa. On his appointment to the Lady Margaret chair at Oxford he incepted as a Master of Arts. In 1981 he became a Doctor of Divinity of the University of Oxford and in 1984 he was elected a Fellow of the British Academy. He has also received the honorary degrees of Doctor of Sacred Theology from the University of the South (1967) and the General Theological Seminary (1968), Doctor of Divinity from the Episcopal Theological Seminary of the Southwest (1981), the University of Dayton (1994) and the Graduate Theological Foundation, Indiana, and Doctor of Canon Law from Nashotah House (1986).

He was the Gifford Lecturer for 1983–1984, lecturing on the topic "In Search of Deity".

Macquarrie is often categorised as both an existentialist and a systematic theologian. His most important philosophical influence is the work of Martin Heidegger. This influence can be traced to Macquarrie's 1954 dissertation, published as An Existentialist Theology: A Comparison of Heidegger and Bultmann (1955). Macquarrie remains one of the most important commentators and explainers of Heidegger's work. His co-translation (with Edward Robinson) of Being and Time into English is considered the canonical version. He was also a notable English-language expositor on the theological and philosophical work of Rudolf Bultmann.

Among Macquarrie's most widely read books are Existentialism, meant as an introduction to the subject, and his major work, Principles of Christian Theology, a work of systematic theology which aims to harmonise existentialism and orthodox Christian thought. His work is characterised by even-handedness to all sides and viewpoints and, although not always readily accessible to those without a good background in philosophy, his writing is considered engaging and often witty - at least judged by the standards of existentialism and systematic theology.

== Views on other faith traditions ==
Macquarrie believed that truth value could reside in other faith traditions, although he rejected syncretism. In his book Mediators Between Human and Divine (1996), he wrote:

In 1964 I published an article entitled 'Christianity and Other Faiths'... [and] I continue to hold the views I expressed then... I believe that, however difficult it may be, we should hold to our own traditions and yet respect and even learn from the traditions of others. I drew the conclusion that there should be an end to proselytizing but that equally there should be no syncretism of the kind typified by the Baháʼí movement. (p. 2)

In that book, Macquarrie commented on what he called nine historical figures who were viewed by their followers as mediators between the human and the divine. Regarding these "mediators", Macquarrie wrote that

[T]here will be no attempt to show that any one of [the mediators] is superior to the others... what has already been said... has shown the impossibility of any such judgment. No human being - and certainly not the present writer - has the exhaustive knowledge of the several mediators or the requisite criteria for making such a judgment. Neither does he or she have the detached situation that would enable a purely objective view of the question. Only God, I suppose, could make such a judgment. (p. 12)

He concluded that

I do not deny for a moment that the truth of God has reached others through other channels – indeed, I hope and pray that it has. So while I have a special attachment to one mediator, I have respect for them all and have tried to give a fair presentation of each. (p. 12)

Macquarrie died on 28 May 2007 at the age of 87. His widow, Jenny, died in August 2008. He is survived by two sons and a daughter. His archives are maintained by the Bodleian Library, Oxford. The Macquarrie Project, a multimedia collection which includes Macquarrie's personal research library, lecture recordings, library notations and a tome of sermons, is housed at the Graduate Theological Foundation in Indiana.

== Works ==
=== Books ===
- Macquarrie, John (1955). An Existentialist Theology: a comparison of Heidegger and Bultmann. Library of Philosophy and Theology. London: SCM Press. OCLC 1213154.
- ——— (1960). The Scope of Demythologizing: Bultmann and His Critics. Library of Philosophy and Theology. London: SCM Press. OCLC 3398057.
- ——— (1965). Studies in Christian Existentialism. Philadelphia, PA: Westminster Press. OCLC 385057.
- ——— (1967). God-Talk: An Examination of the Language and Logic of Theology. New York: Harper & Row. OCLC 378817.
- ——— (1967). God and Secularity. New Directions in Theology Today. Vol. 3. Philadelphia, PA: Westminster Press. OCLC 250894.
- ——— (1968). Contemporary Religious Thinkers: From Idealist Metaphysicians to Existential Theologians. Harper Forum Books. New York: Harper & Row. OCLC 377984.
- ——— (1968). Martin Heidegger. Makers of Contemporary Theology. Richmond: John Knox Press. ISBN 978-0-804-20659-4. OCLC 373485.
- ——— (1970). Three Issues in Ethics. New York: Harper & Row. OCLC 62489.
- ——— (1972). Existentialism. Theological Resources. Philadelphia, PA: Westminster Press. ISBN 978-0-664-20916-2. OCLC 415251.
- ——— (1972). Paths in Spirituality. New York: Harper & Row. ISBN 978-0-060-65366-8. OCLC 333487.
- ——— (1972). The Faith of the People of God: A Lay Theology. New York: Scribner. ISBN 978-0-684-12942-6. OCLC 514460.
- ——— (1975). Christian Unity and Christian Diversity. London: SCM Press.
- ——— (1975). Benediction. The Church Union.
- ——— (1975). Thinking about God. New York: Harper & Row. ISBN 978-0-060-65367-5. OCLC 1346630.
- ——— (1966). Principles of Christian Theology. New York: Scribner. OCLC 384761.. 2nd rev. ed. 1977.
- ——— (1978). Christian Hope. New York: Seabury Press..
- ——— (1978). The Humility of God. Philadelphia: Westminster Press..
- ——— (1984). In Search of Deity: An Essay in Dialectical Theism. Gifford Lectures, 1983. New York: Crossroad. ISBN 978-0-824-50682-7. OCLC 11443103.
- ——— (1984). Mystery and Truth. Milwaukee: Marquette University Press.
- ———, ed. (1967). Dictionary of Christian Ethics. Philadelphia, PA: Westminster Press. OCLC 301246.
- ——— (1986). Theology, Church, and Ministry. New York: Crossroad.
- ———; Childress, James F., eds. (1986). The Westminster Dictionary of Christian Ethics. Philadelphia, PA: Westminster Press. ISBN 978-0-664-20940-7. OCLC 12665561. - a revised edition of A Dictionary of Christian Ethics
- ——— (1987). The Reconciliation of a Penitent: A Report. GS Misc 258. Lambeth: General Synod of the Church of England.
- ——— (1990). Jesus Christ in Modern Thought. London; Philadelphia, PA: SCM Press; Trinity Press International. ISBN 978-0-334-02457-6. OCLC 21077740.
- ——— (1991). Mary for all Christians. Grand Rapids, MI: Eerdmans. ISBN 978-0-802-80543-0. OCLC 22909931.
- ——— (1993). In Search of Humanity: A Theological and Philosophical Approach. London: SCM Press.
- ——— (1994). Heidegger and Christianity. Hensley Henson Lectures, 1993-1994. London: Continuum.
- ——— (1995). Thinghood and Sacramentality. Essex Papers in Theology and Society. Colchester: Centre for the Study of Theology in the University of Essex.
- ——— (1996). Mediators Between Human and Divine. London: Continuum.
- ——— (1998). Christology Revisited. Philadelphia: Trinity Press International.
- ——— (1999). A Guide to the Sacraments. London: SCM Press.
- ——— (1999). On Being a Theologian: Reflections at Eighty. London: SCM Press.
- ——— (2002). Twentieth-Century Religious Thought: The Frontiers of Philosophy and Theology. Edinburgh: Bloomsbury T. & T. Clark. Earlier editions were published in 1963 and 1981.
- ——— (2003). Stubborn Theological Questions. London: SCM Press. ISBN 0-334-02907-4. OCLC 51771306.
- ——— (2004). Two Worlds Are Ours: An Introduction to Christian Mysticism. London: SCM Press.
- ——— (2012). Invitation to Faith. London: SCM Press.
- ——— (2012). The Concept of Peace. Firth Lectures, 1972. Reissued with a new preface. London: SCM Press.

=== Articles ===
- ——— (July 1974). "Some Problems of Modern Christology". Indian Journal of Theology. 23 (2–3): 155–75.
- ——— (1996). "The Legacy of Bultmann". Heythrop Journal. 37 (3): 348–59. doi:10.1111/j.1468-2265.1996.tb00836.x.
- (Spring 1979). "Existentialism and theological method". Communio International Catholic Review.Vol. VI, Number 1: 5-15.

Academic offices
Preceded by F. L. Cross	Lady Margaret Professor of Divinity; 1970–1986	Succeeded by Rowan Williams
