= Guy Stroumsa =

Israeli scholar of religion (born 1948)

Guy Gedalyah Stroumsa
- גיא גדליה סטרומסה
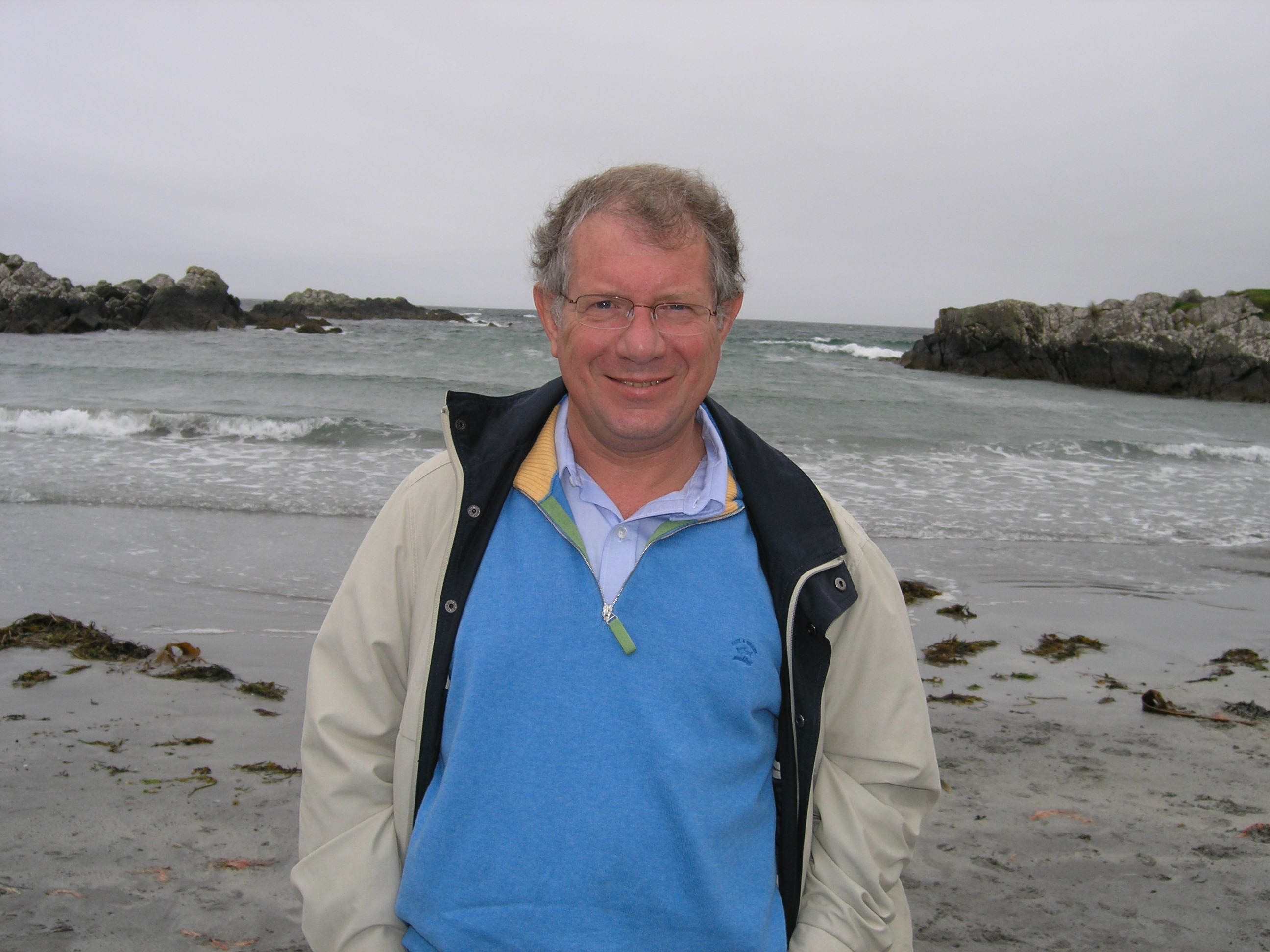
- Guy Stroumsa, 2005
- Born: 27 July 1948 (age 78); Paris, France
- Occupation: Retired Professor of Comparative Religion
- Spouse: Sarah Stroumsa

Academic background
- Education: Harvard University
- Thesis: Another seed: studies in Sethian gnosticism : a thesis (1978)

Guy Gedalyah Stroumsa (Hebrew: גיא גדליה סטרומסה; born 27 July 1948) is an Israeli scholar of religion. He is Martin Buber Professor Emeritus of Comparative Religion at the Hebrew University of Jerusalem and Emeritus Professor of the Study of the Abrahamic Religions at the University of Oxford, where he is an Emeritus Fellow of Lady Margaret Hall. He is a Member of the Israel Academy of Sciences and Humanities, of the British Academy and of the Academia Europea.

== Biography ==
Stroumsa was born in Paris. His parents were Shoah survivors; his father, born in Thessaloniki, survived Auschwitz thanks to his musical skills and his mother, born in Athens, Bergen-Belsen. Stroumsa grew up in Paris. He studied at the Lycée Voltaire and at the Ecole Normale Israélite Orientale, where he was greatly influenced by its principal, Emmanuel Levinas, who taught him philosophy and Talmud. After briefly studying economics and law at the University of Paris, he moved to Israel. For his B.A. (1969), he studied philosophy and Jewish thought at the Hebrew University of Jerusalem. After his military service (1969–1972), he studied for the PhD in the Study of Religion at Harvard University. After the submission of his doctoral dissertation (1978) which dealt with Gnostic mythology, he was appointed a lecturer in the Department of Comparative Religion at the Hebrew University. In 1991 he was appointed to the Martin Buber Chair of Comparative Religion. Stroumsa was the Founding Director of the Center for the Study of Christianity (1999–2005). In 2009 he was appointed Professor of the Study of the Abrahamic Religions at Oxford University and a Fellow of Lady Margaret Hall; he retired in 2013.

He has held Visiting Professorship in a number of universities in Europe and the United States, and has been a Fellow, among other institutions, of Dumbarton Oaks, the Wissenschaftskolleg zu Berlin, and the Katz Center for Advanced Judaic Studies. He has been invited to give Lecture Series at Corpus Christi College and Trinity College, Cambridge, at the Scuola Normale Superiore (Pisa) and the Istituto San Carlo (Modena), and at the College de France (Paris).

Stroumsa received an honorary doctorate from the University of Zurich (2005). In 2008 he was elected a Member of the Israeli Academy of the Sciences and Humanities. He won an Alexander von Humboldt Research Award in 2008. Together with Sarah Stroumsa, he is a recipient of the Leopold Lucas Prize (2018). He is Chevalier de l’Ordre du Mérite.

He is married to Professor Sarah Stroumsa, a scholar of Islamic and Jewish medieval philosophy and theology, who served for four years as the Rector of the Hebrew University of Jerusalem. They have two daughters and five grandchildren.

== Research ==
Guy Stroumsa's research focuses on the dynamics of encounters between religious traditions and institutions in the Roman Empire and in Late Antiquity, in the Mediterranean and the Middle East. He has studied the crystallization of the Abrahamic traditions in late antiquity, as a background to Islam. He sees Gnosis, Manichaeism and Early Christianity as a unique laboratory for understanding religious transformations in late antiquity. In his doctoral dissertation, Stroumsa studied the development of Gnostic mythology, and demonstrated its roots in Judaism and biblical interpretation. In his studies, Stroumsa seeks to cross traditional interdisciplinary boundaries in order to study religious phenomena from a comparative perspective. This approach permits him to understand the mechanisms behind the religious revolution of Late Antiquity, a period which saw the cessation of a number of widespread aspects of ancient religion (such as blood sacrifice) and the development of new systems, which stand at the basis of Judaism, Christianity and Islam.

Stroumsa also works on the history of scholarship on religion, from early modern times to the twentieth century.

Stroumsa is the author of fourteen books, and the editor or co-editor of some twenty books. He has published more than a hundred and thirty articles.

== Works ==
=== Books ===
1. Stroumsa, Guy G. (1984). Another Seed: Studies in Gnostic Mythology (Nag Hammadi Studies. Vol. 24. Leiden: Brill. ISBN 9789004074194. OCLC 12662703.
2. ——— (1992). Savoir et salut: traditions juives et tentations dualistes dans le christianisme ancien (in French). Paris: Le Cerf.
3. ——— (1996). Hidden Wisdom: Esoteric Traditions and the Roots of Christian Mysticism. Studies in the History of Religions. Vol. 70. Leiden: Brill. ISBN 9789004105041. OCLC 782245274. [revised and augmented paperback edition, 2005] = La sapienza nascosta: Tradizioni esoteriche e radici del misticismo cristiano (in Italian). Rome: Arkeios. 2000. ISBN 9788886495493. OCLC 801182382.
4. ——— (1999). Barbarian Philosophy: The Religious Revolution of Early Christianity. Wissenschaftliche Untersuchungen zum Neuen Testament. Vol. 112. Tübingen: Mohr Siebeck. ISBN 9783161471056.
5. ———; Le Brun, Jacques (1998). Les juifs présentés aux chrétiens: textes de Léon de Modène et de Richard Simon, introduits et commentés (in French). Paris: Belles Lettres.
6. ——— (1999). La formazione dell'identita cristiana (in Italian). Brescia: Morcelliana.
7. ——— (1999). Kanon und Kultur: Zwei Studien zur Hermeneutik des antiken Christentums (in German). Berlin & New York: de Gruyter.)
8. ——— (2005). La fin du sacrifice : Mutations religieuses de l'antiquité tardive. Collège de France (in French). Paris: Odile Jacob. ISBN 9782738116345. OCLC 936692185. = La fine del sacrificio: Le mutazioni religiose della tarda antichita. Piccola biblioteca Einaudi. N.S. (in Italian). Vol. 338. Turin: Einaudi. 2006. ISBN 9788806183301. OCLC 493729728. = The End of Sacrifice: Religious Transformations of Late Antiquity. Chicago: Chicago University Press. 2009. ISBN 9780226777382. OCLC 488441585.
9. ——— (2006). Le rire du Christ et autres essais sur le christianisme antique (in French). Paris: Bayard.
10. ——— (2010). A New Science: The Discovery of Religion in the Age of Reason. Cambridge, MA: Harvard University Press. ISBN 9780674048607. OCLC 456169998.
11. ——— (2015). The Making of the Abrahamic Religions in Late Antiquity. Oxford Studies in the Abrahamic Religions. Oxford: Oxford University Press. ISBN 9780198738862. OCLC 918104079.
12. ——— (2016). The Scriptural Universe of Ancient Christianity. Cambridge, MA: Harvard University Press. ISBN 9780674545137. OCLC 946907364.
13. ——— (2017). Religions d'Abraham: histoires croisees (in French). Geneva: Labor et Fides.
14. With Sarah Stroumsa, Eine dreifältige Schnur: über Judentum, Christentum und Islam in Geschichte und Wissenschaft (Tübingen: Mohr Siebeck, 2020).
15. The Idea of Semitic Monotheism: The Rise and Fall of a Scholarly Myth (Oxford: Oxford University Press, 2021)

=== As editor ===
1. With Sh. Shaked and D. Shulman: Gilgul: Transformations, Revolutions and Permanence in the History of Religions, in Honor of R. J. Z. Werblowsky (Suppl. to Numen 50; Leiden: Brill, 1987)
2. With Sh. Shaked and I. Gruenwald: Messiah and Christos: Studies in the Jewish Origins of Christianity, presented to David Flusser at the Occasion of his Seventy Fifth Birthday (Tübingen: Mohr Siebeck, 1992)
3. With O. Limor: Contra Judaeos: Ancient and Medieval Polemics Between Christians and Jews (Texts and Studies in Medieval and Early Modern Judaism: Tübingen: Mohr Siebeck; 1995)
4. With H. G. Kippenberg: Secrecy and Concealment: Studies in the History of Mediterranean and Near Eastern Religions (Studies in the History of Religions 65; Leiden: Brill, 1995)
5. Shlomo Pines, Studies in the History of Religion (The Collected Works of Shlomo Piines, volume IV; Jerusalem: Magnes, 1996), edited by Guy G. Stroumsa
6. With G. Stanton: Tolerance and Intolerance in Ancient Judaism and Early Christianity (Cambridge: Cambridge University Press; 1998; Paperback edition, Cambridge, 2008)
7. With A. Kofsky: Sharing the Sacred: Religious Contacts and Conflicts in the Holy Land, 1st.-15th century (Jerusalem: Ben Zvi; 1998)
8. With A. Baumgarten and J. Assmann, Soul, Self, Body in Religious Experience: Studies in the History of Religions (Leiden: Brill, 1998)
9. With D. Shulman: Dream Cultures: Explorations in the Comparative History of Dreaming (New York: Oxford University Press, 1999)
10. With J. Assmann, Transforming the Inner Self in Ancient Religions (Leiden: Brill, 1999)
11. With D. Shulman, Self and Self Transformation in the History of Religions (New York: Oxford University Press, 2001; Paperback edition, Oxford, 2002)
12. With Jan Assmann, Archiv für Religionsgeschichte 3 (2002), "Das 17. Jahrhundert und die Ursprünge der Religionsgeschichte" (Munich, Leipzig: Saur)
13. With M. Finkelberg, Homer, the Bible, and Beyond: Literary and Religious Canons in the Ancient World (Jerusalem Studies in Religion and Culture, 2; Leiden, Boston: Brill, 2003)
14. With O. Limor, Christians and Christianity in the Holy Land: From the Origins to the Latin Kingdoms (Turnhout: Brepols, 2006)
15. Gershom Scholem and Morton Smith: Correspondence, 1945-1982 (Jerusalem Studies in Religion and Culture; Leiden: Brill, 2008)
16. With Markus Bockmuehl, Paradise in Antiquity: Jewish and Christian Views (Cambridge: Cambridge University Press, 2010)
17. with R. Bonfil, O. Irshai and R. Talgam, eds., Jews of Byzantium: Dialectics of Minority and Majority Cultures (Jerusalem Studies in Religion and Culture: Leiden: Brill, 2011)
18. with Adam Silverstein and Moshe Blidstein, The Oxford Handbook of the Abrahamic Religions (Oxford: Oxford University Press, 2015)
19. Dynamics of Monotheism in Late Antiquity (Oxford University Press, 2025).

Stroumsa is also the author of about 160 scholarly articles. Many of these articles can be found online on Guy Stroumsa's personal page on academia.edu
