= N. P. Williams =

English Anglican priest and theologian (1883–1943)

The Reverend N. P. Williams
- Born: Norman Powell Williams; 5 September 1883; Durham, England
- Died: 11 May 1943 (aged 59); Oxford, England
- Spouse: Muriel de Lérisson Cazenove (m. 1927)
- Children: Charles Williams, Baron Williams of Elvel

Ecclesiastical career
- Religion: Christianity (Anglican)
- Church: Church of England
- Ordained: 1908 (deacon); 1909 (priest)

Academic background
- Education: Christ Church, Oxford

Academic work
- Discipline: Theology
- School or tradition: Liberal Anglo-Catholicism
- Institutions: Magdalen College, Oxford; Exeter College, Oxford; Christ Church, Oxford

Norman Powell Williams (1883–1943), known as N. P. Williams, was an Anglican theologian and priest. Educated at Durham School and at Christ Church, Oxford, he enjoyed a succession of appointments at that university: Fellow of Magdalen (1906), Chaplain of Exeter (1909), Lady Margaret Professor of Divinity and Canon of Christ Church (1927). In 1924 he was Bampton lecturer.

His 1924 Bampton Lectures were published in 1927 under the title The Ideas of the Fall and of Original Sin, which continues to be an influential source for students of original sin to this day and was included in Ronald W. Hepburn's 1973 entry on the "Cosmic Fall" in the Dictionary of the History of Ideas. Williams argued for a "transcendental" or "pre-cosmic fall" that occurred in the "life-force" and "during an 'absolute' time" prior to the "differentiation of life into its present multiplicity of forms and the emergence of separate species."

He served as the Lady Margaret's Professor of Divinity at Oxford, from 1927 until his death in April, 1943. Also in 1927, he became the Canon of Christ Church, Oxford. A collected edition of his works was published by Eric Waldram Kemp in 1954, entitled simply N. P. Williams. On the flap jacket of this edition, N. P. Williams was given this description:

The young cleric cocking a snook at dignitaries -- the powerful controversialist -- the brilliant, sometimes perhaps too brilliant theologian with his sesquipedalian eloquence -- beneath these and more essential than these was a good friend, a devoted husband and father, a true priest with pastoral zeal and wide charity. This was the man. The memoirs in this book, by his widow and former pupil, and yet more clearly Dr Williams' own addresses, show us this man. A shy, diffident person, not easy to live with but easy to love, and certainly worthy of being remembered and honoured for himself.

Williams married Muriel, daughter of Arthur Philip Cazenove, of a landed gentry family; their son was Charles Williams, Baron Williams of Elvel.

== Selected works ==
- The Christian Doctrine of the Last Things, 11 December 1927
- The Ideas of the Fall and of Original Sin (Bampton Lectures 1924), 1927
- The Grace of God, 1930
- Northern Catholicism; ed. by N. P. Williams & Charles Harris. London. S.P.C.K., 1933
- Deaconesses and "Holy Orders", 1938
- Judicial Authority in the Church of England, 1940
- Sermons and Addresses, Compiled with a Memoir, SPCK, 1954

Academic offices
Preceded by Walter Lock	Lady Margaret Professor of Divinity; 1927–1943	Succeeded by F. L. Cross
