= Markus Vinzent =

German academic

- Born: 12 April 1959 (age 67); Saarbrücken, Saarland, West Germany (now Germany)
- Occupation: Scholar of religion

Academic background
- Education: Catholic University of Eichstätt-Ingolstadt; Sorbonne University; LMU Munich; Heidelberg University

Academic work
- Discipline: Religious studies
- Sub-discipline: Early Christianity; Patristics; Medieval Studies; Historiography; Retromodernity; Religion and Business

Markus Vinzent (born 12 April 1959) is a German academic and historian of religion, specializing in early Christianity, Patristics, Medieval Studies, Historiography, Retromodernity, Religion and Business. He was a professor in the Department of Theology & Religious Studies at King's College London, and fellow of the Max Weber Center for Advanced Social and Cultural Studies, Erfurt, Germany.

== Biography ==
Vinzent studied philosophy, theology, Jewish studies, ancient history, and archaeology at the Catholic University of Eichstätt-Ingolstadt, Sorbonne University (Diplom, Philosophy and Theology, 1978–83), LMU Munich (Ph.D., 1987–91), and Heidelberg University (Postdoctoral research, Habilitation, 1991-5). He worked as a pastor between 1984 and 1991, and he has also been a serial entrepreneur (IT, Internet, HR, energy, waste, utilities and infrastructure) from the 1990s onward.

Vinzent held academic posts as senior research fellow at King's College, Cambridge (1991-3), senior research fellow at the Berlin-Brandenburgische Akademie der Wissenschaft (tenure), Berlin (1993-5), C4-professor (non-tenure) for history of theology in the times of the Reformation and Modernity, University of Mainz, Germany (1996-7), C4-professor for history of theology (tenure), University of Cologne, Germany (1997-9), HG Wood Professor of Theology, University of Birmingham (1999-2010), including a stint as head of department (1999-2001). He joined the Department of Theology and Religious Studies at King's College London in September 2010. During the years 2010 to 2015 he served as Adjunct Professor of Korea University, Seoul. Since 2012 he is Fellow of the Max Weber Centre for Advanced Social and Cultural Studies, Erfurt University. Additionally, in 2015/2016 Fellow of TOPOI, Humboldt University Berlin, and in 2017/2018 Guest scholar at Augsburg University, Germany.

In 2003, he initiated and co-authored the Birmingham study with Guidelines on the ‘Trialogue of Cultures’ as a result of a major 8-European-country study of teaching and learning about Islam, Judaism and Christianity in schools, funded by the ALTANA/BMW-Foundation (Herbert-Quandt-Stiftung) with a major research grant (2000-2002). This resulted in the creation of a 10-year initiative by the foundation in which during the years 2005 to 2015 around 200 German schools took part in a trialogue competition. The aim was, based on the Guidelines to develop creative projects in schools for a better co-cultural-living. The results have led to a list of publications, a children broadcast teaching course by the Hessischer Rundfunk and various other media.

Together with Professor Allen Brent, he has directed the major research project on 'Early Christian Iconography and Epigraphy', a project funded by the British Academy (2011–12); as prime investigator he was running the Arts and Humanities Research Council (AHRC) funded major research project on ‘Meister Eckhart and the early 14th century Parisian University’ (2013-2016) following his re-discovery of new Parisian Questions of this medieval philosopher and theologian. He is now co-leading together with Marie-Anne Vannier (Université de Lorraine, Metz) a major research project on ‘Teaching and Preaching with Patristic auctoritates – Meister Eckhart in France and Germany, past and present’, funded by the French Agence National de la Recherche (ANR) and the Deutsche Forschungsgemeinschaft (DFG) (2018-2021).

In 2020, he was given the prestigious scholarly prize, the Chair Gutenberg, by the University of Strasbourg and the Cercle Gutenberg.

Since 2003 he has served as one of the directors of the International Conference on Patristic Studies, is editor-in-chief of Studia Patristica, the conference's official publication, has initiated and is editor of the series Studia Patristica Supplements and of the series Eckhart: Texts and Studies.

Vinzent is board member of the Eckhart Gesellschaft (2016-), and member of a series of academic societies, the European Academy of Science (Vienna, 2001-), the Academia Europaea (London, 2015-), the Eckhart Society (2011-), International Society of Neoplatonic Studies (2012-), Internationale Gesellschaft für Theologische Mediävistik (2014-), Oswald von Wolkenstein-Gesellschaft (2017-).

== Reception ==
Despite Markus Vinzent's arguments to the contrary, the majority of scholars view the Gospel of Marcion as a second century work that edited canonical Luke. Clare K. Rothschild and James Barker finds Vinzent's case “wholly unconvincing”, relegating his monograph to “a nonscientific genre.”

== Writings ==
- Christ's Torah: The Making of the New Testament in the Second Century, New York, Routledge, 2024
- Concordance to the Precanonical and Canonical New Testament, Tübingen, Narr Francke Attempto Verlag, 2023
- Christi Thora. Die Entstehung des Neuen Testaments im 2. Jahrhundert, Freiburg i.Br., Herder, 2022
- [together with Loris Sturlese], Meister Eckhart, The German Works. 64 Homilies for the Liturgical Year. 1. De tempore, Eckhart: Texts and Studies 9, Leuven, Peeters Publishers, 2019, ISBN 978-90-429-3608-9
- [together with Loris Sturlese], Meister Eckhart, The German Works. 56 Homilies for the Liturgical Year. 2. De sanctis, Eckhart: Texts and Studies 12, Leuven, Peeters Publishers, 2019, ISBN 978-90-429-3932-5
- Offener Anfang. Die Entstehung des Christentums im 2. Jahrhundert. Herder Verlag, Freiburg i.Br. 2019, ISBN 978-3-451-38577-3
- Writing the History of Early Christianity. From Reception to Retrospection, Cambridge University Press, Cambridge 2019, ISBN 978-1-1086-4705-2
- [together with Kelley McCarthy Spoerl], Eusebius of Caesarea, Against Marcellus and Ecclesiastical Theology, Translation with notes by Kelley McCarthy Spoerl and Markus Vinzent, The Fathers of the Church (Chicago: The Catholic University of America Press, 2017).ISBN 081322991X
- Tertullian’s Preface on Marcion’s Gospel, Studia Patristica Supplements, 5 (Leuven: Peeters, 2016).ISBN 978-90-429-3320-0
- [together with Loris Sturlese], Index Eckhardianus: Meister Eckhart und seine Quellen I Die Bibel, Meister Eckhart. Lateinische und Deutsche Werke. Die lateinischen Werke VI, 1.-6. Lieferung (Stuttgart: Kohlhammer, 2015).ISBN 3170296760
- Die Auferstehung Christi im frühen Christentum (Freiburg i.Br., 2014), German translation and revised version of M12. ISBN 3451312123
- Marcion and the Dating of the Synoptic Gospels, Studia Patristica Supplements 2 (Leuven: Peeters, 2014). ISBN 9042930276 See also the Chinese translation in the series ‘Classics and Interpretations’, trans. Shuhong Zheng (Beijing: Huaxia Publishing House, 2016).
- Meister Eckhart’s On the Lord’s Prayer: Introduction, Text, Translation, and Commentary (Leuven: Peeters, 2012). ISBN 9789042925847
- Christ's Resurrection in Early Christianity and the Making of the New Testament, (Ashgate, 2011). ISBN 9781409417910
- The Art of Detachment, (Leuven: Peeters, 2011). ISBN 9781409417927
- Der Ursprung des Apostolikums im Urteil der kritischen Forschung, Forschungen zur Kirchen- und Dogmengeschichte Band 89, (Göttingen: Vandenhoeck & Ruprecht, 2006). ISBN 9783525551974
- Markell von Ankyra, Die Fragmente; Der Brief an Julius von Rom, Supplements to Vigiliae Christianae 39 (Leiden: Brill, 1997). ISBN 9789004109070
- Pseudo-Athanasius, Contra Arianos IV. Eine Schrift gegen Asterius von Kappadokien, Eusebius von Cäsarea, Markell von Ankyra und Photin von Sirmium, Supplements to Vigiliae Christianae 36 (Leiden: E.J. Brill, 1996). ISBN 9789004106864
- Asterius von Kappadokien, Die Theologischen Fragmente, Supplements to Vigiliae Christianae 20 (Leiden: E.J. Brill, 1993). ISBN 9789004098411
