= William Sanday (theologian) =

British theologian and biblical scholar (1843–1920)

The Reverend William Sanday FBA
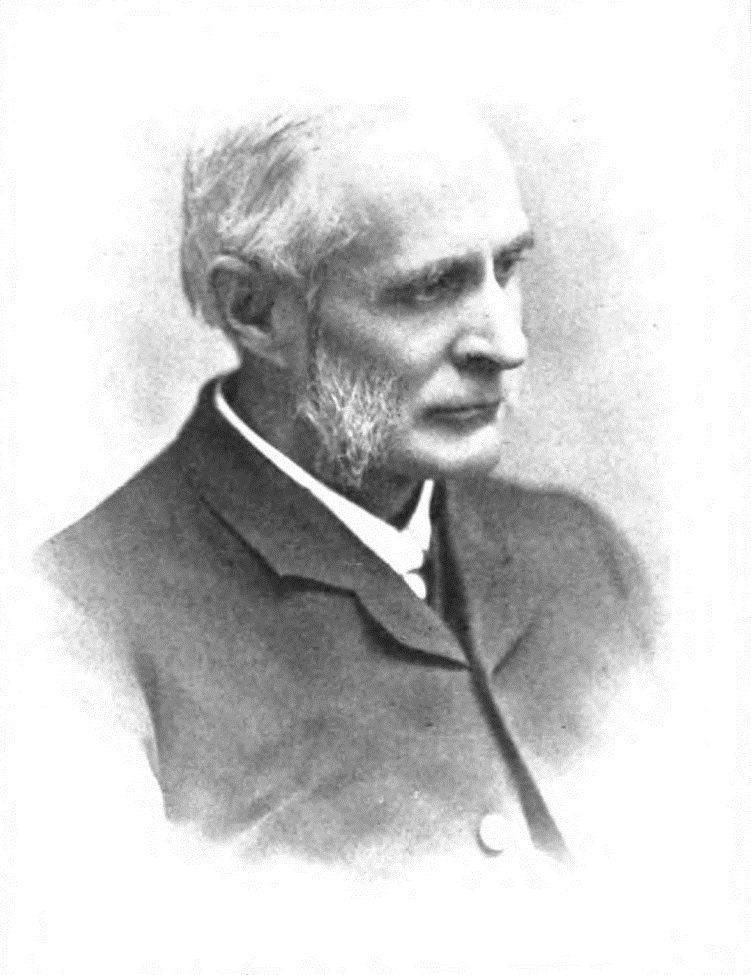
- Born: 1 August 1843; Holme Pierrepont, England
- Died: 16 September 1920 (aged 77); Oxford, England
- Spouse: Marian Hastings (m. 1877)

Ecclesiastical career
- Religion: Christianity (Anglican)
- Church: Church of England
- Ordained: 1867 (deacon); 1869 (priest)

Academic background
- Education: Balliol College, Oxford

Academic work
- Discipline: Biblical studies; theology
- Sub-discipline: New Testament studies
- School or tradition: Theological liberalism
- Institutions: Trinity College, Oxford; Bishop Hatfield's Hall, Durham; Exeter College, Oxford; Christ Church, Oxford
- Influenced: Francis Burkitt; Arthur Peake; B. H. Streeter

William Sanday FBA (1 August 1843 – 16 September 1920) was a British Anglican theologian and priest. He was the Dean Ireland's Professor of Exegesis of Holy Scripture from 1883 to 1895 and the Lady Margaret Professor of Divinity from 1895 to 1919; both chairs were at the University of Oxford. He had previously been Master of Bishop Hatfield's Hall, University of Durham.

== Biography ==
Sanday was born in Holme Pierrepont, Nottinghamshire, England, to William Sanday and Elizabeth Mann. He was a British academic theologian and biblical scholar. He was ordained as a deacon in 1867 and as a priest in 1869. In 1877 he married Marian Hastings, daughter of Woodman Hastings.

He was Dean Ireland's Professor of Exegesis of Holy Scripture at Oxford between 1883 and 1895, as well as Lady Margaret Professor of Divinity and Canon of Christ Church between 1895 and 1919. He became a Fellow of the British Academy (FBA) in 1903 (one of the original cohort), and received an honorary Doctor of Letters (DLitt) degree from the University of Cambridge in May 1902.

He also worked as one of the editors of the 1880 Variorum Bible, and contributed articles to the Encyclopaedia Biblica and The American Journal of Theology.

Sanday died on 16 September 1920 in Oxford.

== Works ==
- Sanday, William (1872). The Authorship and Historical Character of the Fourth Gospel: considered in reference to the contents of the Gospel itself: a critical essay. London: Macmillan.
- ——— (1876). The Gospels in the Second Century: an examination of the critical part of a work entitled "Supernatural religion". Macmillan. ISBN 9780837050409. OCLC 551689940.
- ———; Headlam, Arthur C. (1895). A Critical and Exegetical Commentary on the Epistle to the Romans. International Critical Commentary. Edinburgh: T & T Clark.
- ——— (1899). Outlines of the Life of Christ. New York: C. Scribner's Sons. OCLC 7108831. 1906 2nd edition
- ——— (1907). The Life of Christ in Recent Research. New York: Oxford University Press. OCLC 3009845.
- ——— (1911). Studies in the Synoptic Problem. Oxford: Clarendon Press. OCLC 753275.
- ——— (1918). The New Testament Background. 1920 edition
- ——— (2001). Essays in Biblical Criticism and Exegesis. Journal for the Study of the New Testament - Supplement series. Vol. 225. Sheffield: Sheffield Academic Press. ISBN 9780567619730. OCLC 741687252.

Academic offices
Preceded by James Barmby	Master of Bishop Hatfield's Hall, Durham; 1876–1883	Succeeded by Archibald Robertson
Preceded by Henry Liddon	Dean Ireland's Professor of the Exegesis of Holy Scripture; 1883–1895	Succeeded by Walter Lock
Preceded by Charles Abel Heurtley	Lady Margaret Professor of Divinity; 1895–1919	Succeeded by Walter Lock
