= Sarah Stroumsa =

Israeli scholar (born 1950)

- שרה סטרומזה
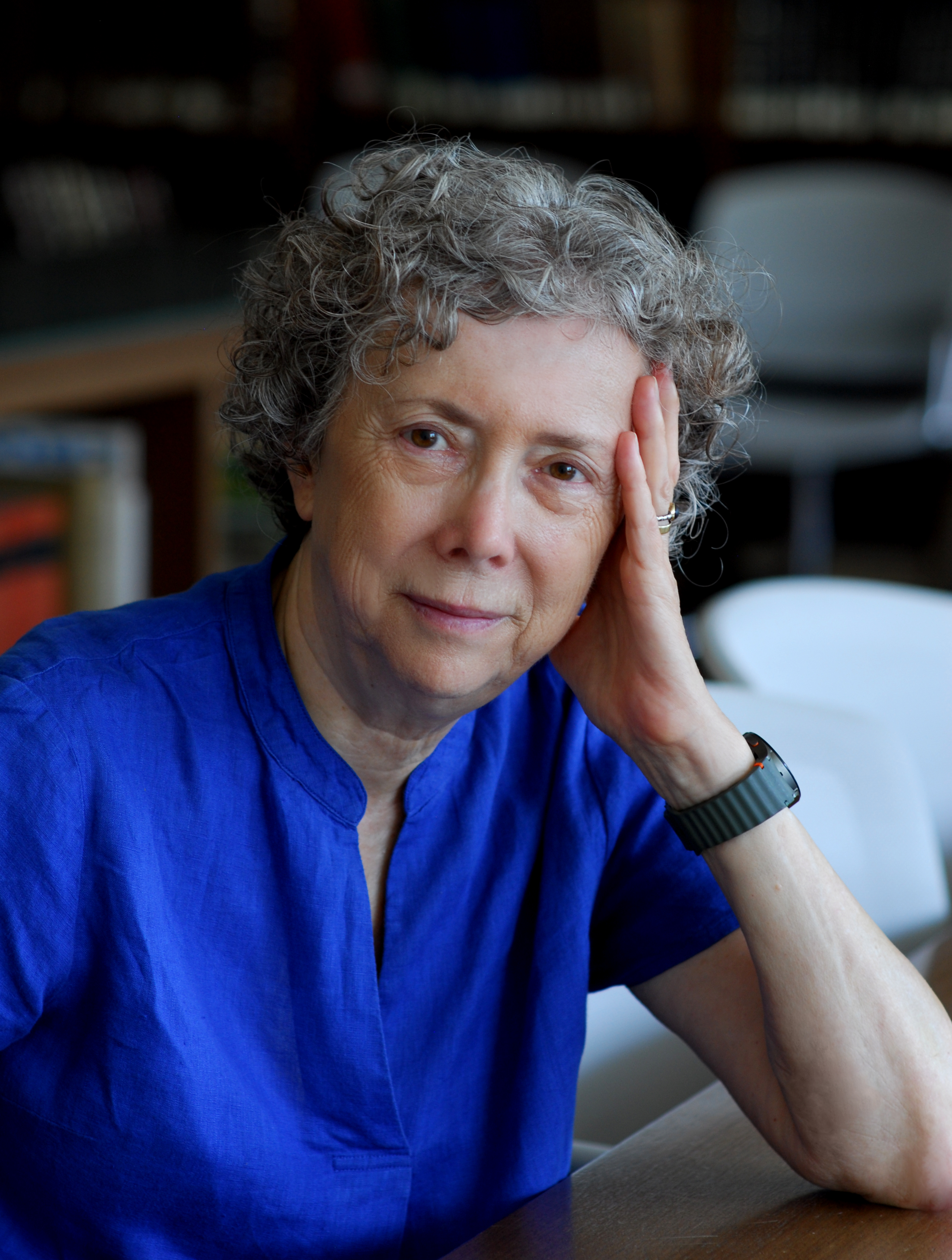
- Born: 1950 (age 75–76); Haifa, Israel
- Spouse: Guy Stroumsa

Academic background
- Education: Élève Titulaire, École Pratique des Hautes Études, Paris; B.A., PhD., The Hebrew University of Jerusalem
- Thesis: דאוד אבן מרואן אלמקמץ וחיבורו ״עשרון מקאלה״ (1983)

Academic work
- Institutions: The Hebrew University of Jerusalem
- Website: huji.academia.edu/SarahStroumsa

Sarah Stroumsa (Hebrew: שרה סטרומזה; born 1950) is the Alice and Jack Ormut Professor Emerita of Arabic Studies at the Hebrew University of Jerusalem. She received her academic education at the Hebrew University, as well as at the École Pratique des Hautes Études in Paris. She taught in the Department of Arabic Language and Literature and the Department of Jewish Thought at the Hebrew University of Jerusalem, where she served as vice-rector and then as rector. She was a visiting professor at Harvard, Chicago, Michigan, Paris, and Münster.

Her academic focus is the history of philosophical and theological thought in Arabic in the early Islamic Middle Ages and the medieval Judeo-Arabic culture. In her philologically based work, she strives to offer a multifocal approach to the study of intellectual history.

Prof. Stroumsa served as the president of the Society for Judeo-Arabic Studies. She is a member of the Israel Academy of Sciences and Humanities as well as of the Berlin-Brandenburg Academy of Sciences and Humanities, the European Academy of Sciences and Arts, the American Philosophical Society, and an associate member of the Academy of the Kingdom of Morocco. In 2025 she was a recipient of the order Pour le Mérite.

== Career ==
After earning her B.A, Stroumsa joined the faculty at The Hebrew University of Jerusalem in 1977. By 1999, she was appointed to full professor and later sat as vice-rector of the university from 2003 until 2006.

In 2003, she was named the Alice and Jack Ormut Professor of Arabic Studies at the Hebrew University of Jerusalem. A few years later, she became the first woman to serve as rector of the Hebrew University. The year after her promotion, Stroumsa was the recipient of the Italian Solidarity Award. During her tenure as rector, The Hebrew University of Jerusalem jumped from 72nd to 57th on the World Universities Ranking list. She also helped establish the university's first Muslim prayer room.

After ending her tenure as rector, she was the recipient of a research grant from the Alexander von Humboldt Foundation for a research project at Freie Universität Berlin. In 2018, Stroumsa and her husband earned the 2018 Leopold Lucas Prize.

== Awards ==
- 2025: Pour le Mérite for Sciences and Arts
- 2023: The Academy of the Kingdom of Morocco, associate member
- 2023: The Israeli Academy of Sciences and Humanities, member
- 2022: Middle East & Islamic Studies Association of Israel, Outstanding Member
- 2021: The American Philosophical Society
- 2018: Dr. Leopold Lucas Prize
- 2016: European Academy of Sciences and Arts, member
- 2012: Berlin Brandenburg Academy of Sciences and Humanities, member
- 2010: Humboldt Research Prize
- 2009: Italian Order of Merit O.S.S.I

== Personal life ==
Stroumsa is married to Guy Stroumsa and they have two daughters.

== Published works ==
Regarding Maimonides, she insists that Leo Strauss's 'dichotomy of esoteric versus exoteric writing does not do justice to Maimonides' context-sensitive rhetoric,' claiming instead that he "'plays a double game', reconciling and integrating dualities through the constant, creative interplay between Arabic and Hebrew, Islamic and Jewish culture."

- Dawud ibn Marwan al-Muqammis's 'Ishrun Maqala (Etudes sur le judaisme medieval XIII, Leiden: Brill, 1989)
- With Daniel J. Lasker, The Polemic of Nestor the Priest: Qiṣṣat Mujādalat al- Usquf and Sefer Nestor ha-Komer (Jerusalem: Ben Zvi Institute, 1996), 2 Vols. [Spanish translation: El libro de Néstor el Sacerdote, tr. M. del Valle Pérez and C. del Valle Rodríguez, Madrid, 1998].
- The Beginnings of the Maimonidean Controversy in the East: Yosef Ibn Shimʿon's Silencing Epistle Concerning the Resurrection of the Dead (Jerusalem: Ben Zvi Institute, 1999; Hebrew).
- Freethinkers of Medieval Islam: Ibn al-Rāwandī, Abū Bakr al-Rāzī, and Their Impact on Islamic Thought (Islamic Philosophy and Theology XXXV; Leiden: Brill, 1999; Paperback edition 2016). [Indonesian translation: Para Bemikir Bebas Islam: Mengenal Pemikiran Teologi Ibn ar-Rawandi dan Abu Bakr ar-Razi, LKiS, 2006].
- With H. Ben-Shammai, E. Batat, S. Butbul, and D. Sklare, Judaeo-Arabic Manuscripts in the Firkovitch Collections: Yefet Ben ʿEli al-Basri, Commentary on Genesis, A Sample Catalogue (Jerusalem: Ben Zvi Institute, 2000; Hebrew).
- Maimonides in his World: Portrait of a Mediterranean Thinker (Princeton: Princeton University Press, 2009; Paperback edition, 2012).
- An updated Hebrew version of Maimonides in his World: הרמב״ם בעולמו: דיוקנו של הוגה ים תיכוני (ירושלים: מאגנס, 2021)
- Dāwūd al-Muqammaṣ, Twenty Chapters. The Judeo-Arabic text, transliterated into Arabic characters, with a parallel English translation, notes, and introduction (Provo, Utah: Brigham Young University Press, 2016).
- Andalus and Sefarad: On Philosophy and its History in Islamic Spain (Princeton: Princeton University Press, 2019).
- With Guy G. Stroumsa, Eine dreifältiger Schnur: Über Judentum, Christentum, und Islam in Geschichte und Wissenschaft / A Cord of Three Strands: On Judaism, Christianity and Islam in History and Scholarship (Tübingen: Mohr Siebeck: 2020).
- דאוד בן מרואן אלמקמץ, עשרים פרקים: תרגום מוער מערבית יהודית (ירושלים: מאגנס, תשפ״ג 2022)
- Théologie et philosophie au temps des Almohades (XIIe siècle de l’Ère commune) (Rabat: Académie du Royaume du Maroc, 2023).
- Das Kaleidoskop der Convivencia: Denktraditionen des Mittelalters im Austausch zwischen Islam, Judentum und Christentum (Blumenberg Vorlesungen 7; Freiburg: Herder, 2023).

== Edited volumes ==
- The Collected Works of Shlomo Pines, vol. III, Studies in the History of Arabic Philosophy (Hebrew; Jerusalem: Magnes, 1996).
- With Meir M. Bar-Asher, Simon Hopkins and Bruno Chiesa, A Word Fitly Spoken: Studies in Mediaeval Exegesis of the Hebrew Bible and the Qurʾān presented to Haggai Ben-Shammai (Hebrew; Jerusalem: Ben-Zvi Institute, 2007).
- With Haggai Ben-Shammai and Shaul Shaked, Exchange and Transmission Across Cultural Boundaries: Philosophy, Mysticism and Science in the Mediterranean World. Proceedings of an International Workshop Held in Memory of Professor Shlomo Pines at the Institute for Advanced Studies, The Hebrew University of Jerusalem, 28 February – 2 March 2005 (Jerusalem: The Israel Academy of Sciences and Humanities, 2013).
- With Sabine Schmidtke and Maribel Fierro, Histories of Books in the Islamicate World. Part I. (Intellectual History of the Islamicate World, 4, 2016).
- With Sabine Schmidtke and Maribel Fierro, Histories of Books in the Islamicate World. Part II. (Intellectual History of the Islamicate World, 5.1, 2017).
- With Geoffrey Khan and Sabine Schmidtke, Studies in Literary Genizot (Intellectual History of the Islamicate World, 8, 2020).
