= Journal of Religious History =

- Discipline: History of religions, Religious studies
- Language: English
- Edited by: Sarah Irving-Stonebraker and Miles Pattenden

Publication details
- History: 1960-present
- Publisher: Wiley-Blackwell on behalf of the Religious History Association (Australia)
- Frequency: Quarterly

Standard abbreviations
- ISO 4: J. Relig. Hist.

Indexing
- ISSN: 0022-4227 (print); 1467-9809 (web)
- LCCN: 63024049
- OCLC no.: 1783012

Links
- Journal homepage

The Journal of Religious History is a leading peer-reviewed academic journal published by Wiley-Blackwell on behalf of the Religious History Association. It publishes high quality research that makes original and significant contribution to the field of religious history. It also explores religion and its related subjects, along with debates on comparative method and theory in religious history.

The Association for the Journal of Religious History was established in 1959 and published its first issue in 1960. In 2010, the Religious History Association was formed through the amalgamation of the Association for the Journal of Religious History and the Religious History Society (founded in 1998). The journal serves as the official publication of the Religious History Association.

== Abstracting and indexing ==
The journal is abstracted and indexed by Academic Search Elite, FRANCIS, America: History & Life, Australian Public Affairs Information Service, Arts and Humanities Citation Index, ATLA Religion Database, CSA Biological Sciences Database, CSA Environmental Sciences & Pollution Management Database, Current Contents/Arts & Humanities, Ecology Abstracts, Historical Abstracts, InfoTrac, ProQuest, and Sociological Abstracts.
