= Carol Harrison (theologian) =

British theologian and historian (born 1960)

Carol Harrison FBA
- Born: 27 November 1960 (age 65)
- Title: Lady Margaret Professor of Divinity (2015–present)

Academic background
- Education: Lady Margaret Hall, Oxford
- Thesis: "A Man That Looks on Glass..." (1988)

Academic work
- Discipline: Theology; history
- Sub-discipline: Patristics; ecclesiastical history
- Institutions: Durham University; Christ Church, Oxford
- Notable students: Edward Dowler
- Main interests: Augustine of Hippo; auditory culture

Carol Harrison FBA (born 27 November 1960) is a British theologian and ecclesiastical historian, specialising in Augustine of Hippo. Since January 2015, she has been Lady Margaret Professor of Divinity at the University of Oxford; she is the first woman and first lay person to hold this appointment. She is a fellow of Christ Church, Oxford, and an honorary fellow of Lady Margaret Hall, Oxford. On 27 April 2015, she was installed as a Canon of Christ Church Cathedral, Oxford. She was previously Professor of the History and Theology of the Latin West at Durham University.

== Early life and education ==
Harrison was born on 27 November 1960 in West Hartlepool, England. She matriculated into Lady Margaret Hall, Oxford, in 1979 to study theology. She remained at the University of Oxford to undertake postgraduate research, and completed her Doctor of Philosophy (DPhil) degree in 1988. Her doctoral thesis was titled "A Man That Looks on Glass...": Revelation and Beauty in the Thought of Saint Augustine.

== Academic career ==
Before moving to Oxford, Harrison was a lecturer in the Department of Theology and Religion at Durham University. She rose to be Professor of History and Theology of the Latin West. She was co-founder of the Durham International Network for Music Theology.

In July 2014, Harrison was announced as the next Lady Margaret Professor of Divinity at the University of Oxford. She took up the appointment on 1 January 2015, and was duly elected a fellow of Christ Church, Oxford (the college to which the professorship is attached). In April 2015, she was installed as a lay canon of Christ Church Cathedral, Oxford. In April 2017, she was awarded an honorary doctorate by the National University of Cuyo in Mendoza, Argentina.

In July 2018, Harrison was elected Fellow of the British Academy (FBA), the United Kingdom's national academy for the humanities and social sciences.

== Selected works ==
- Harrison, Carol (1992). Beauty and Revelation in the Thought of Saint Augustine. Oxford: Clarendon Press. ISBN 0198263422.
- Harrison, Carol (2000). Augustine: Christian Truth and Fractured Humanity. Oxford: Oxford University Press. ISBN 0198752202.
- Harrison, Carol (2006). Rethinking Augustine's Early Theology an Argument for Continuity. Oxford: Oxford University Press. ISBN 0199281661.
- Harrison, Carol (2013). The Art of Listening in the Early Church. Oxford: Oxford University Press. ISBN 978-0199641437.
- Harrison, Carol; Humfress, Caroline; Sandwell, Isabella, eds. (2014). Being Christian in Late Antiquity: A Festschrift for Gillian Clark. Oxford: Oxford University Press. ISBN 978-0199656035.

Academic offices
Preceded by George Pattison	Lady Margaret Professor of Divinity; 2015–present	Incumbent
