= Lady Margaret Professor of Divinity =

The Lady Margaret Professorship of Divinity is a senior professorship in Christ Church of the University of Oxford. The professorship was founded from the benefaction of Lady Margaret Beaufort (1443–1509), mother of Henry VII. Its holders were all priests until 2015, when Carol Harrison, a lay theologian, was appointed to the chair.

== List of chair holders ==
- ?–1530 John Kynton
- 1539–? Richard Wilkes
- 1540–1549 Hugh Weston
- 1561 Francis Babington
- 1564 James Calfhill
- 1565–1594 Edward Cradock
- 1613–1614 Sebastian Benefield
- 1627 Samuel Fell
- 1638 Thomas Laurence
- 1648–1652 Francis Cheynell
- 1652 Henry Wilkinson
- 1660 Thomas Barlow
- 1676 John Hall
- 1691 Henry Maurice
- 1691–1705 Thomas Sykes
- 1705–1716 John Wynne
- 1715–1728 William Delaune
- 1728–1768 Thomas Jenner
- 1768–1783 Thomas Randolph
- 1783–1798 Timothy Neve
- 1798–1827 Septimus Collinson
- 1827–1853 Godfrey Faussett
- 1853–1895 Charles Abel Heurtley
- 1895–1919 William Sanday
- 1919–1927 Walter Lock
- 1927–1943 N. P. Williams
- 1944–1968 F. L. Cross
- 1970–1986 John Macquarrie
- 1986–1991 Rowan Williams
- 1996–2003 John Webster
- 2004–2013 George Pattison
- 2015–present Carol Harrison

== See also ==
- Lady Margaret's Professor of Divinity at the University of Cambridge
- List of professorships at the University of Oxford
