= Studia Patristica =

- Discipline: Religion, Early Christianity, Patristics
- Language: English
- Edited by: Allen Brent, Markus Vinzent

Publication details
- History: 1957-present
- Publisher: Peeters Publishers
- Frequency: Annually

Standard abbreviations
- ISO 4: Stud. Patrist.

Indexing
- ISSN: 0585-542X
- OCLC no.: 72655850

Links
- Journal homepage

Studia Patristica is a peer-reviewed academic book series established in 1957, focused on the study of patristics. It is the official publication of the Oxford International Conference on Patristic Studies, which convenes every four years.

== History ==
The series was originally published by Akademie-Verlag and has been published annually by Peeters Publishers since volume 15.

Since 2011, the series has expanded to include papers from other national and international patristic conferences.

Beginning in 2012, Peeters Publishers began issuing the Studia Patristica Supplements, a series of monographs on topics related to patristics.

== Editors ==
The current editors-in-chief are Markus Vinzent (King's College London) and Allen Brent (King's College London).

== Abstracting and Indexing ==
Studia Patristica is abstracted and indexed in Scopus, JSTOR, L'Année philologique, ATLA Religion Database, and MLA International Bibliography.

== See also ==
- Oxford International Conference on Patristic Studies
- Patristics
- Early Christianity
