= List of honorary fellows of Keble College, Oxford =

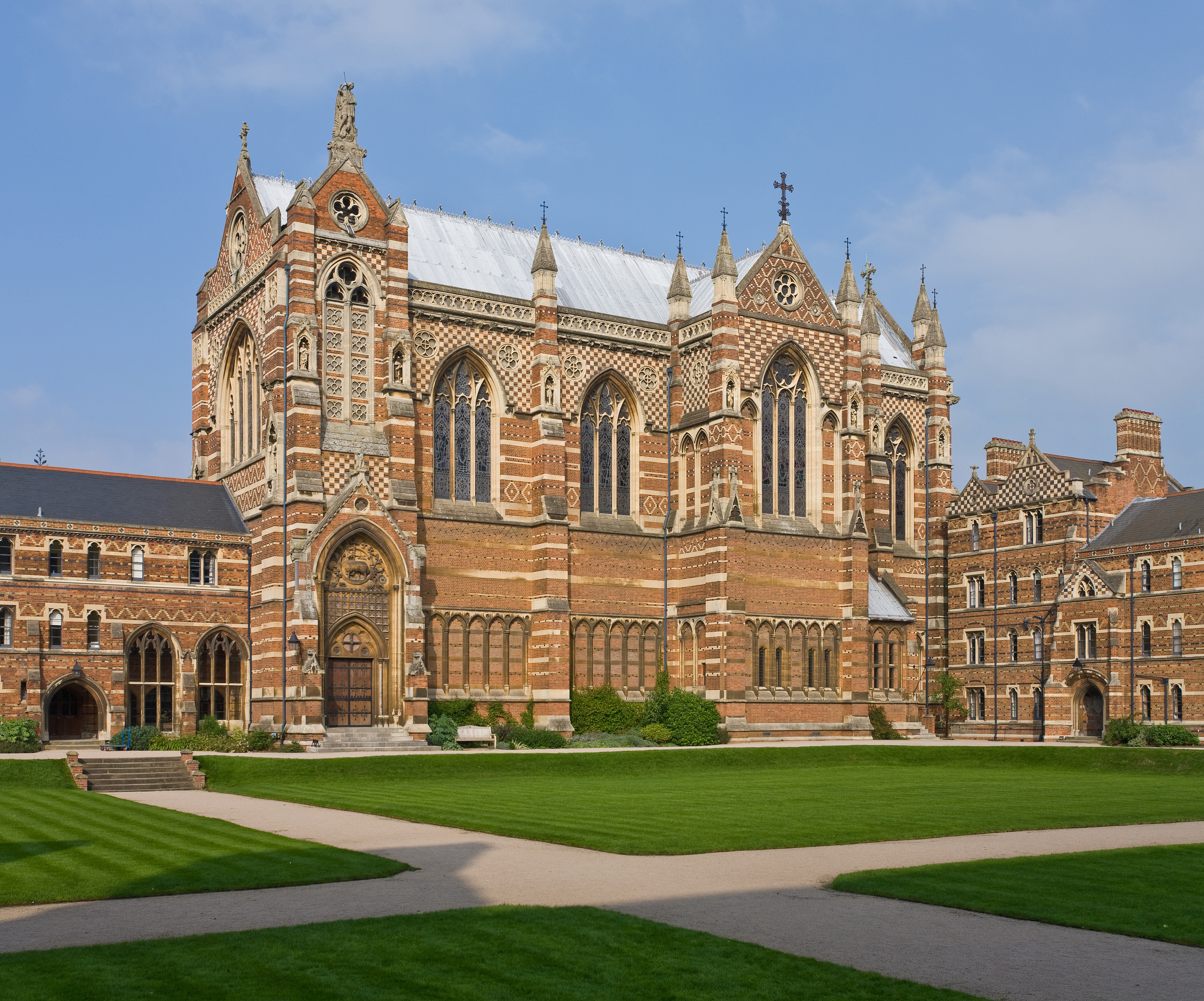
The chapel of Keble College, Oxford

Keble College is one of the constituent colleges of the University of Oxford. It was founded in memory of the Anglican clergyman John Keble, who died in 1866, and was intended to cater for men whose financial resources were insufficient to enable them to study at one of the older Oxford colleges. After a public appeal for donations in John Keble's memory, the college opened in 1870. The college's buildings – which were quite unlike any previous Oxford college, with their use of coloured bricks in patterns – were designed by William Butterfield; there have been later additions as the college has grown.

The Governing Body of the college has the ability to elect "distinguished persons" to Honorary Fellowships. Under the current statutes of the college, Honorary Fellows cannot vote at meetings of the Governing Body and do not receive financial reward, but they receive "such other privileges as the Governing Body may determine." They can be called upon to help decide whether to dismiss or discipline members of academic staff (including the Warden of the college).

The first four Honorary Fellows were elected in 1931. Two of them (Edward Talbot and Walter Lock) were former Wardens of the college; the other two, Sir Wilmot Herringham (a former Vice-Chancellor of the University of London) and Sir Reginald Craddock (a former Lieutenant-Governor of Burma), had studied at Keble College before achieving prominence in public life. Honorary Fellows have included former students (Old Members), Fellows, and Wardens, as well as some with no previous academic connection to the college. In this latter group there are benefactors (for example Sir Anthony O'Reilly, elected 2002), and individuals of distinction such as former U.S. President Ronald Reagan (elected 1994) and the poet Sir John Betjeman (elected 1972). Betjeman, who studied at Magdalen College, Oxford, was involved in Keble's centenary appeal in 1970: The Times said in its obituary of him that the Honorary Fellowship was particularly appropriate because of the college's "architectural and Anglican connotations", Betjeman having strong interests in both areas. As of July 2011, the longest-serving Honorary Fellows are Raoul Franklin and Dennis Nineham, both of whom were elected in 1980. The three longest-serving Honorary Fellows are Sir John Forsdyke (Principal Librarian of the British Museum; appointed 1937, died 1979), Sir Thomas Armstrong (conductor; appointed 1955, died 1994) and Harry Carpenter (Warden, later Bishop of Oxford; appointed 1960, died 1993).

== Honorary Fellows ==
The abbreviations used in the "Link" column denote the person's connection with the college before election as an Honorary Fellow:

- C – A member of the college council: the Warden and Council governed the college between 6 June 1870 (the date of incorporation) and 9 April 1952 (the date when the college's statutes were amended to make the college self-governing with control passing to the Warden and Fellows).
- F – A former Fellow of the college
- OM – An Old Member of the college
- W – A former Warden of the college

A dash denotes that the person had no previous academic link with the college.

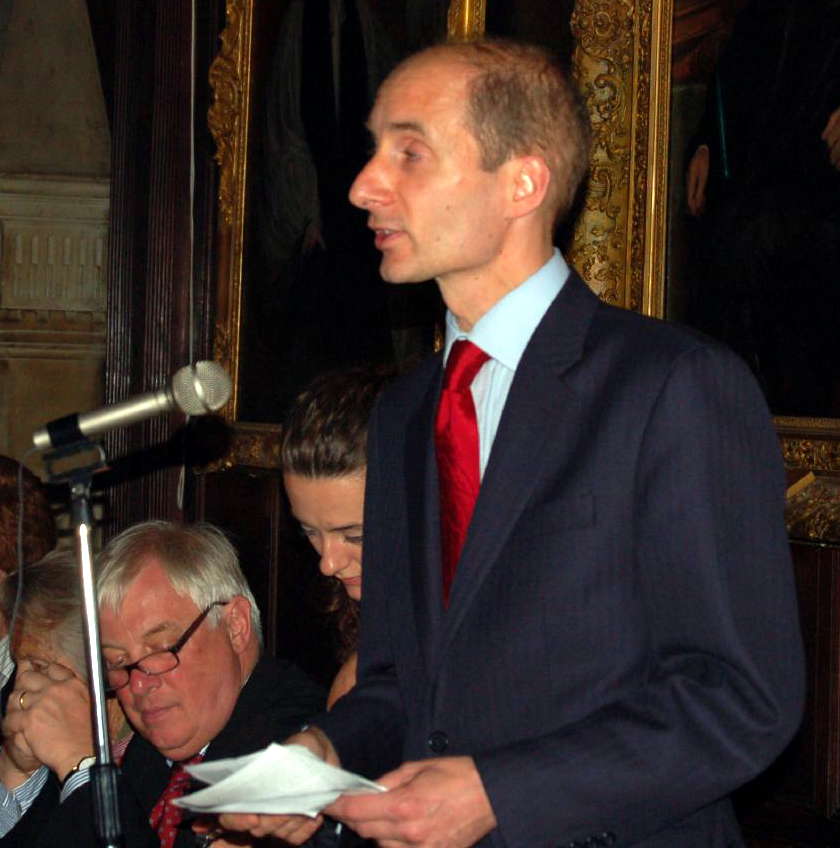
Lord Adonis, appointed an Honorary Fellow in 2008

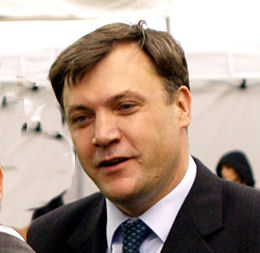
Ed Balls, appointed an Honorary Fellow in 2008

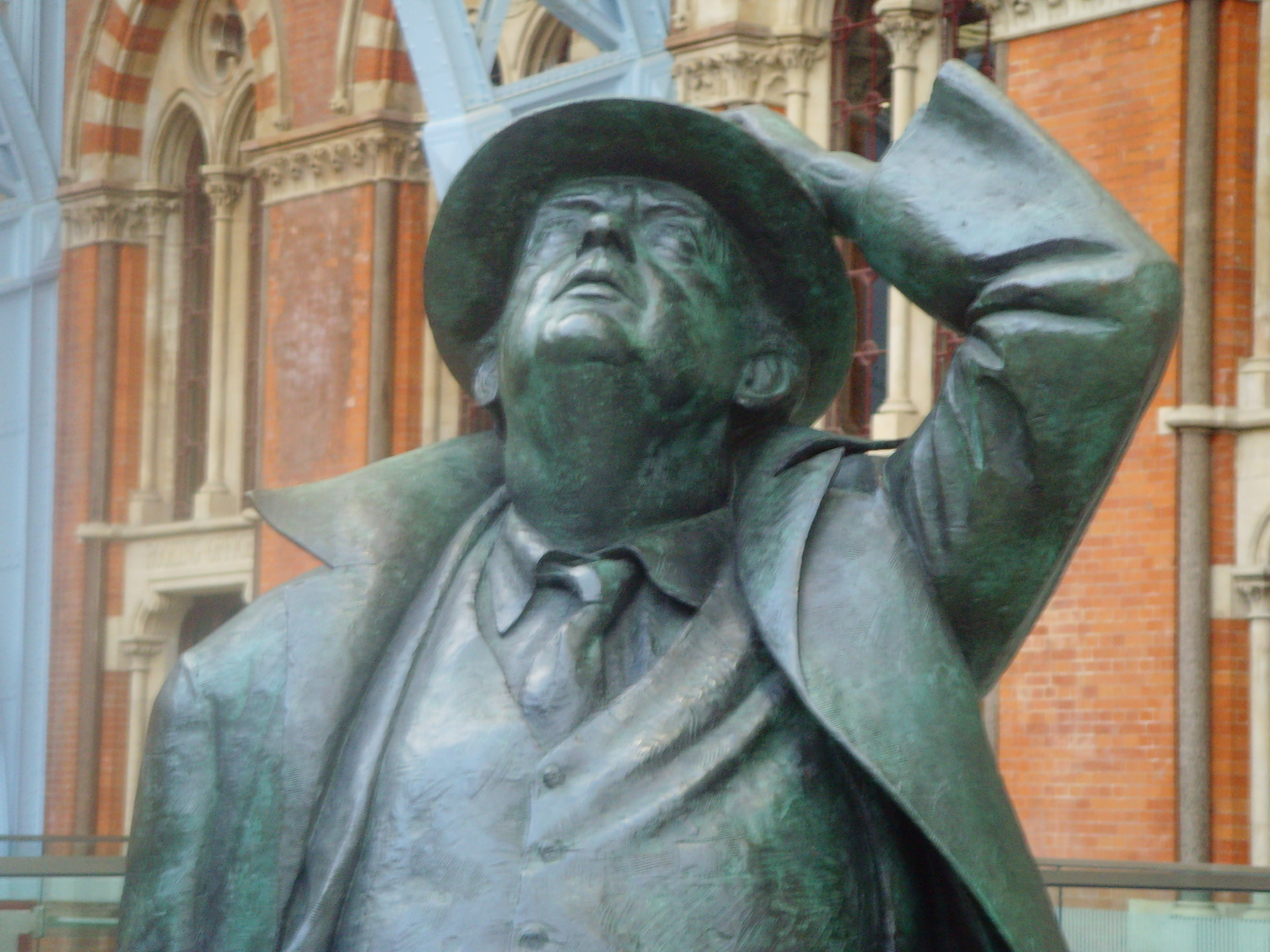
Sir John Betjeman, appointed an Honorary Fellow in 1972

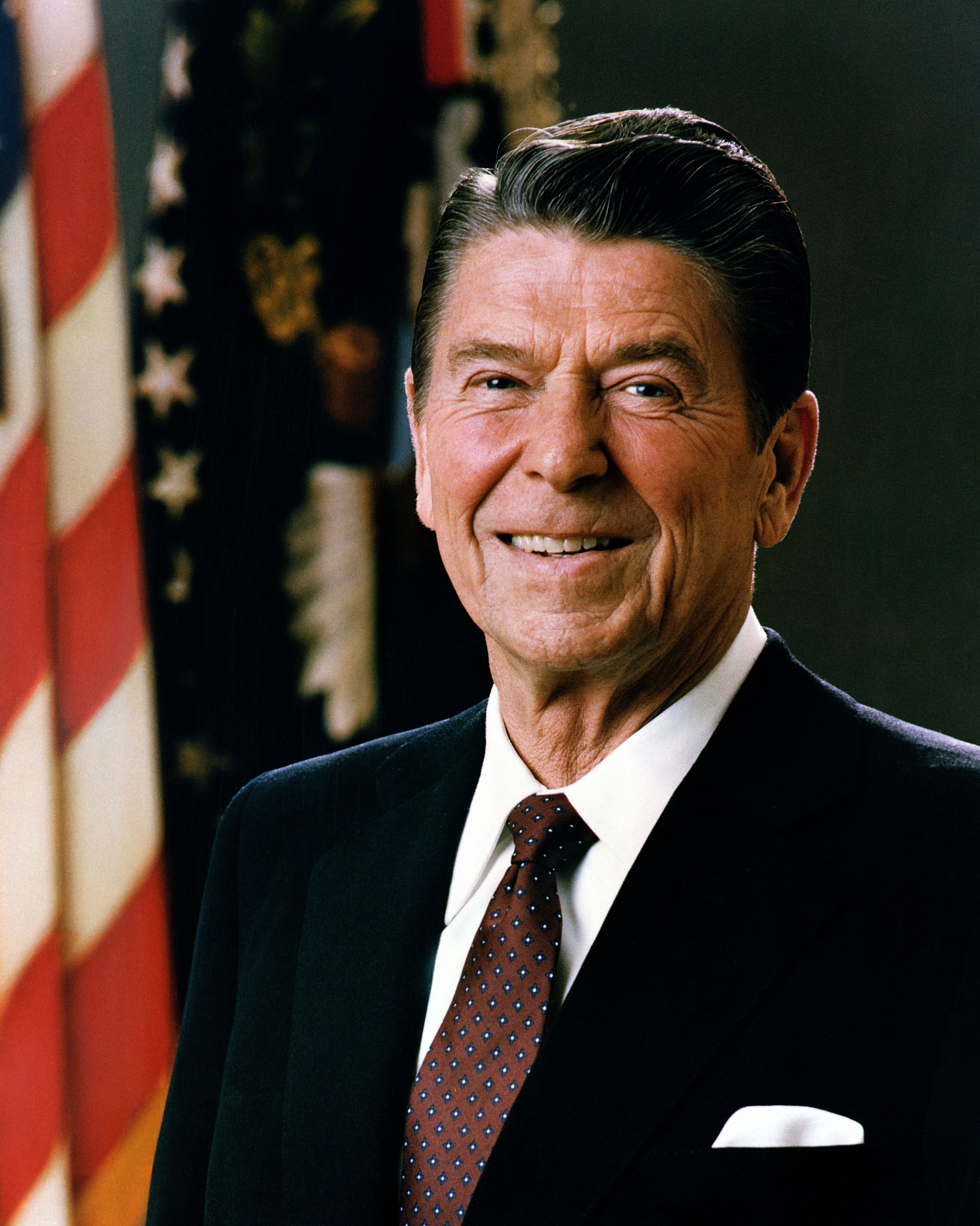
Ronald Reagan, appointed an Honorary Fellow in 1994

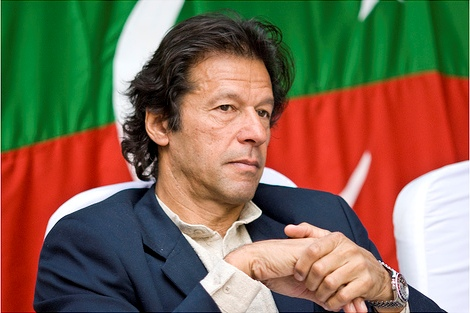
Imran Khan, the cricketer and politician, became an Honorary Fellow in 1988.

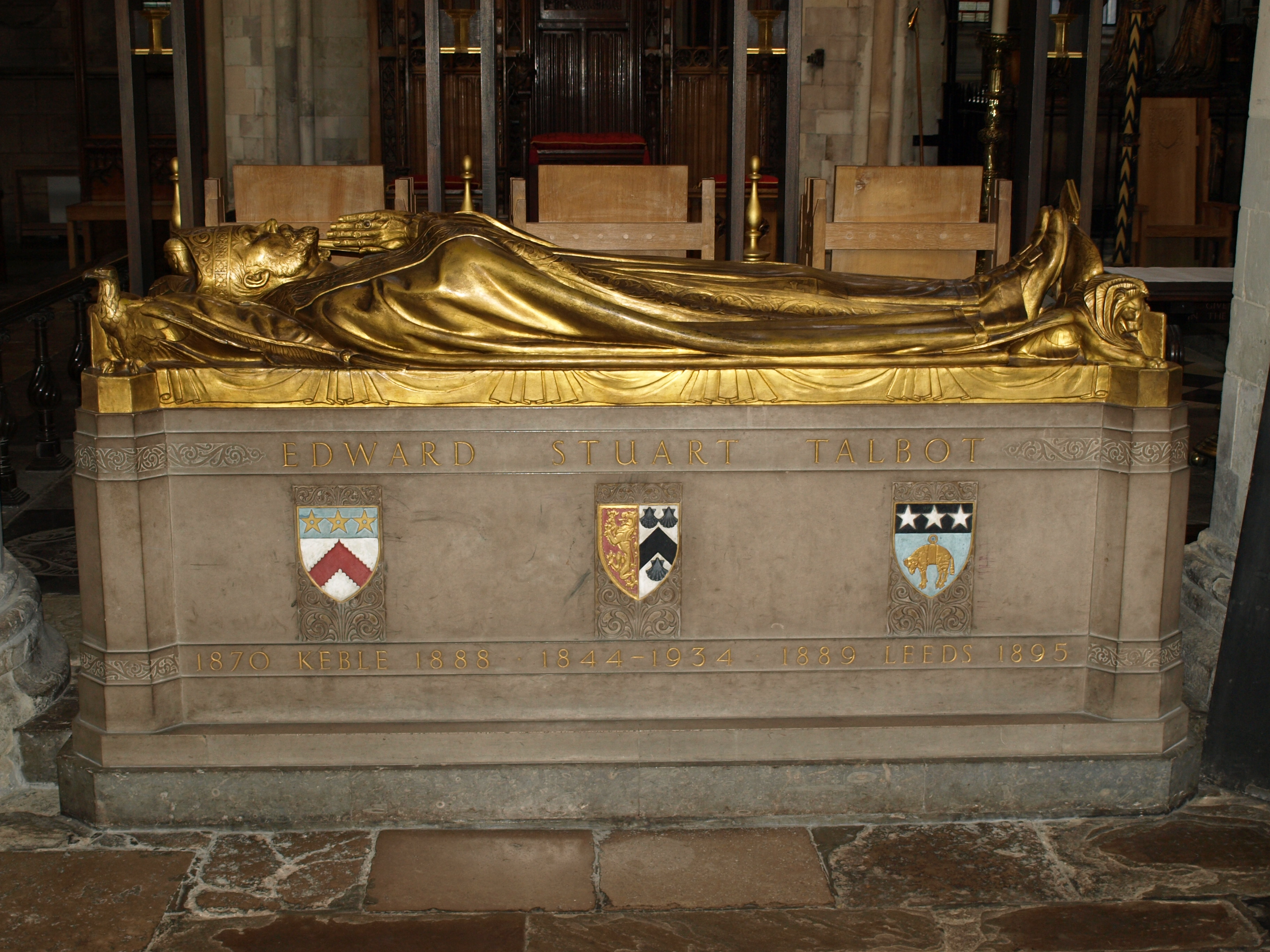
The memorial to Edward Talbot, Warden of Keble from 1870 to 1888, and an Honorary Fellow from 1931

Name	Year	Link	Notes	Ref(s)
Eric Abbott	1960	W	Warden (1956–60); Dean of Westminster Abbey (1959–74)	
Andrew Adonis, Baron Adonis	2008	OM	Secretary of State for Transport (2009–10)	
Zain Asher	2021	OM	News anchor	
Sir Thomas Armstrong	1955	OM	Organist of Christ Church Cathedral, Oxford (1933–55); Principal of the Royal Academy of Music (1955–68)	
Sir Christopher Ball	1989	W	Warden (1980–88)	
Andrew Balls	2021	OM	Investment Manager	
Ed Balls	2008	OM	Secretary of State for Children, Schools and Families (2007–10)	
Spencer Barrett	1981	F	Fellow and Tutor in Classics (1952–81)	
Timothy Besley	2013	OM	Economist, School Professor of Economics and Political Science LSE	
Sir John Betjeman	1972	–	Poet Laureate (1972–84); one of the "Friends" of the college's Centenary Appeal	
Roger Boden	2020	F	Burser of Keble	
Sir Walter Bodmer	1982	–	Human geneticist; Principal of Hertford College, Oxford (1996–2005)	
John Bridcut	2020	OM	Documentary filmmaker	
Edwin Cameron	2003	OM	South African Rhodes Scholar; Judge of the Supreme Court of Appeal of South Africa (2000–08) and of the Constitutional Court of South Africa from 2009	
Harry Carpenter	1960	W	Warden (1939–55); Bishop of Oxford (1955–70)	
Quassim Cassam	2021	OM	Philosopher	
Hugh Cecil, 1st Baron Quickswood	1952	C	Fellow of Hertford College, Oxford (1892–1936); MP for Oxford University (1910–37); council member (1898–1952)	
Lodwrick Cook	1993	–	American businessman and philanthropist; chief executive of ARCO, a college benefactor	
Sir Reginald Craddock	1931	OM	Lieutenant-Governor of Burma (1917–22); MP for Combined English Universities (1931–37)	
Sir Barrington Cunliffe	2008	F	Professor of European Archaeology at Oxford, and Fellow (1972–2007)	
Adrian Darby	1998	F	Fellow and Tutor in Economics (1963–1985); a former Chairman of the Royal Society for the Protection of Birds, among other conservation roles	
Cecil Davidge	1968	F	Fellow and Tutor in Jurisprudence (1933–68), also Bursar (1945–68) and Sub-Warden (1965–68)	
Andre de Breyne	1973	–	College benefactor; his ashes are buried in the college quadrangle named after him.	
Victoria de Breyne	2002	–	College benefactor, widow of Andre de Breyne; graduate scholarships are named after her.	
Walter de la Mare	1944	–	Poet and novelist	
Arthur Dickens	1971	F	Fellow and Tutor in History (1933–49); Professor of History at the University of London (1967–77)	
Christopher Dobson	2009	OM	John Humphrey Plummer Professor of Chemical and Structural Biology at the University of Cambridge (2001 onwards); Master of St John's College, Cambridge (2007 onwards)	
David Douglas	1960	OM	Professor of Medieval History at the University of Leeds (1939–45); Professor of History at the University of Bristol (1945–63)	
Sir David Eastwood	2006	F	Junior Research Fellow in History (1983–86); former Chief Executive of the Higher Education Funding Council for England; appointed Vice-Chancellor of the University of Birmingham in 2009	
Sir Donald Farquharson	1989	OM	High Court judge (1981–89); Court of Appeal judge (1989–95)	
Sir John Forsdyke	1937	OM	Director and Principal Librarian of the British Museum (1936–50)	
Raoul Franklin	1980	F	Fellow and Tutor in Engineering (1963–78); Vice-Chancellor (1978–98) and Professor of Plasma Physics and Technology (1986–98) at City University London	
Cyril Garbett	1942	OM	Bishop of Southwark (1919–32) and of Winchester (1932–42); Archbishop of York (1942–55)	
Robin Geffen	2010	OM	Fund manager and founder of Neptune Investment Management who has donated more than £1,500,000 to Keble	
Charles Green	1935	OM	Bishop of Bangor (1928–44); Archbishop of Wales (1934–44)	
James Griffin	1996	F	Fellow and Tutor in Philosophy (1966–96); White's Professor of Moral Philosophy at Oxford (1996–2000)	
Sir Roy Griffiths	1987	OM	Businessman and government advisor on the National Health Service	
Jeremy Hardie	1998	F	Fellow and Tutor in Economics (1968–75)	
Christopher Hawkes	1972	F	Professor of European Archaeology at Oxford and Fellow (1946–72)	
John Hayes	1984	OM	Director of the National Portrait Gallery, London (1974–94)	
Sir Charles Hayward	1973	–	Entrepreneur and philanthropist	
Laurence Helsby, Baron Helsby	1959	OM	First Civil Service Commissioner (1954–59); joint Permanent Secretary to the Treasury and Head of the Home Civil Service (1963–68)	
Sir Wilmot Herringham	1931	OM	Vice-Chancellor of the University of London (1912–15); Consulting Physician to the Forces in France (1914–19)	
Nugent Hicks	1934	F	Dean of Keble (1901–09); Bishop of Gibraltar (1927–33); Bishop of Lincoln (1933–42)	
Sir Geoffrey Hill	1981	OM	Poet; Professor of Literature and Religion at Boston University (1988–2006)	
Paul Johnson	2022	OM	Economist, director of the Institute for Fiscal Studies	
Imran Khan	1988	OM	Played international cricket for Pakistan (1971–92); founder of the political party Pakistan Tehreek-e-Insaf	
Beresford Kidd	1940	W	Warden (1920–39)	
Henry Ley	1941	OM	Organist and Choirmaster at Christ Church Cathedral, Oxford (1909–26); a former organ scholar of the college	
Robert Lloyd	1990	OM	Opera singer and broadcaster	
Walter Lock	1931	W	Warden (1897–1920)	
Sir Maurice Lyell	1962	OM	High Court judge (1962–71)	
Bryan Magee	1994	OM	Writer and broadcaster; MP for Leyton (1974–83)	
James Martin	2005	OM	Benefactor of the college and the university, described as Oxford's "most generous benefactor in modern times"	
Andreas Michaelis	2020	OM	German ambassador to the United Kingdom	
Michael Mingos	1999	F	Fellow and Tutor in Chemistry (1976–92); Principal of St Edmund Hall, Oxford (1999–2009); Professor of Chemistry at Oxford (2000 onwards)	
Sir Peter Morrison	1989	OM	MP for City of Chester (1974–92); Minister of State in the Department of Employment (1983–85), Department of Trade and Industry (1985–86) and Department of Energy (1987–90)	
Robert Mortimer	1951	OM	Regius Professor of Moral and Pastoral Theology at Oxford (1944–49); Bishop of Exeter (1949–73)	
Yasumasa Nagamine	2022	-	Japanese ambassador to the United Kingdom and justice of the Supreme Court of Japan	
Dennis Nineham	1980	W	Regius Professor of Divinity at Cambridge University and Fellow of Emmanuel College, Cambridge (1964–69); Warden of Keble (1969–79); Professor of Theology at the University of Bristol (1980–86)	
Howard Nixon	1980	OM	Bibliographer; Librarian of Westminster Abbey (1974–83)	
David Owen Norris	2006	OM	Pianist, composer and broadcaster	
Sir Peter North	1984	F/OM	Fellow and Tutor in Law (1965–76); Law Commissioner (1976–84, retaining his Fellowship); Principal of Jesus College, Oxford (1984–2005); Vice-Chancellor of Oxford University (1993–97)	
Sir Anthony O'Reilly	2002	–	Benefactor, after whom the O'Reilly Theatre is named	
Sir Peter Pears	1978	OM	Singer and partner of Benjamin Britten; studied at Keble for one year without obtaining a degree	
Malik Peiris	2023	OM	Virologist	
Sir Jonathan Phillips	2022	W	Civil servant and warden of Keble	
Sir Ghillean Prance	1994	OM	Botanist and ecologist; scientific director of the Eden Project	
David Lewis Prosser	1949	OM	Bishop of St David's (1927–50) and Archbishop of Wales (1944–49)	
Gordon Rawcliffe	1976	OM	Professor of Electrical Engineering at the University of Bristol (1944–75)	
Geoffrey Raynor	1972	OM	Metallurgist; Professor at the University of Birmingham (1949–69)	
Ronald Reagan	1994	–	President of the United States (1981–89); visited the college in 1992 and was principal guest at a lunch	
George Richardson	1994	W	Economist; Warden (1989–94)	
Sir Ivor Roberts	2001	OM	Diplomat, serving as British ambassador to Yugoslavia, Ireland and Italy; President of Trinity College, Oxford since 2006	
George Robinson	2002	OM	Hedge fund manager and college benefactor, after whom the Sloane Robinson building is named	
Angela Saini	2022	OM	Journalist and broadcaster	
Kannon Shanmugam	2021	OM	Lawyer	
Sir Larry Siedentop	2020	F	Political philosopher	
Sir David Spiegelhalter	2022	OM	Statistician	
Sir Frank Stenton	1947	OM	Professor of Modern History at Reading University (1912–46), Vice-Chancellor of Reading (1946–50)	
Robert Stevens	1983	OM	Lawyer and academic; Chancellor of the University of California, Santa Cruz (1987–91) and Master of Pembroke College, Oxford (1993–2001)	
Donald Stokes, Lord Stokes of Leyland	1986	–	British industrialist, who was chairman and managing director of British Leyland Motor Corporation (1968–75)	
Sir Andy Street	2017	OM	Businessman and politician	
Edward Talbot	1931	W	First Warden (1870–88); thereafter Bishop of Rochester (1895–1905), of Southwark (1905–11) and of Winchester (1911–23)	
John Terraine	1986	OM	Military historian, with a particular interest in Douglas Haig and the First World War	
Richard Thornton	1986	OM	International investment manager and company director; supporter of the college chapel	
Chad Varah	1981	OM	Founder of The Samaritans	
Kate Varah	2023	OM	Theatre director	
Alfred von Engel	1982	F	Physicist and Research Fellow at the college	
Desmond Watkins	1994	OM	College benefactor; former director of Shell Oil	
J. R. H. Weaver	1939	OM	Professor of Modern History at Trinity College Dublin (1911–13); editor of the Dictionary of National Biography (1928–37); President of Trinity College, Oxford (1938–54)	
Sir Andreas Whittam Smith	1990	OM	Co-founder of The Independent; former president of the British Board of Film Classification	
Sir David Williams	1992	OM	Academic at the University of Cambridge – President of Wolfson College, Cambridge (1980–92), Rouse Ball Professor of English Law, (1983–92) and Vice-Chancellor (1989–96)	
David Wilson, Baron Wilson of Tillyorn	1987	OM	Governor of Hong Kong (1987–92); Master of Peterhouse, Cambridge (2002–08)	

== See also ==
- List of members of the Council of Keble College, Oxford
- List of Honorary Fellows of Jesus College, Oxford
