= National service of thanksgiving =

Act of Christian worship

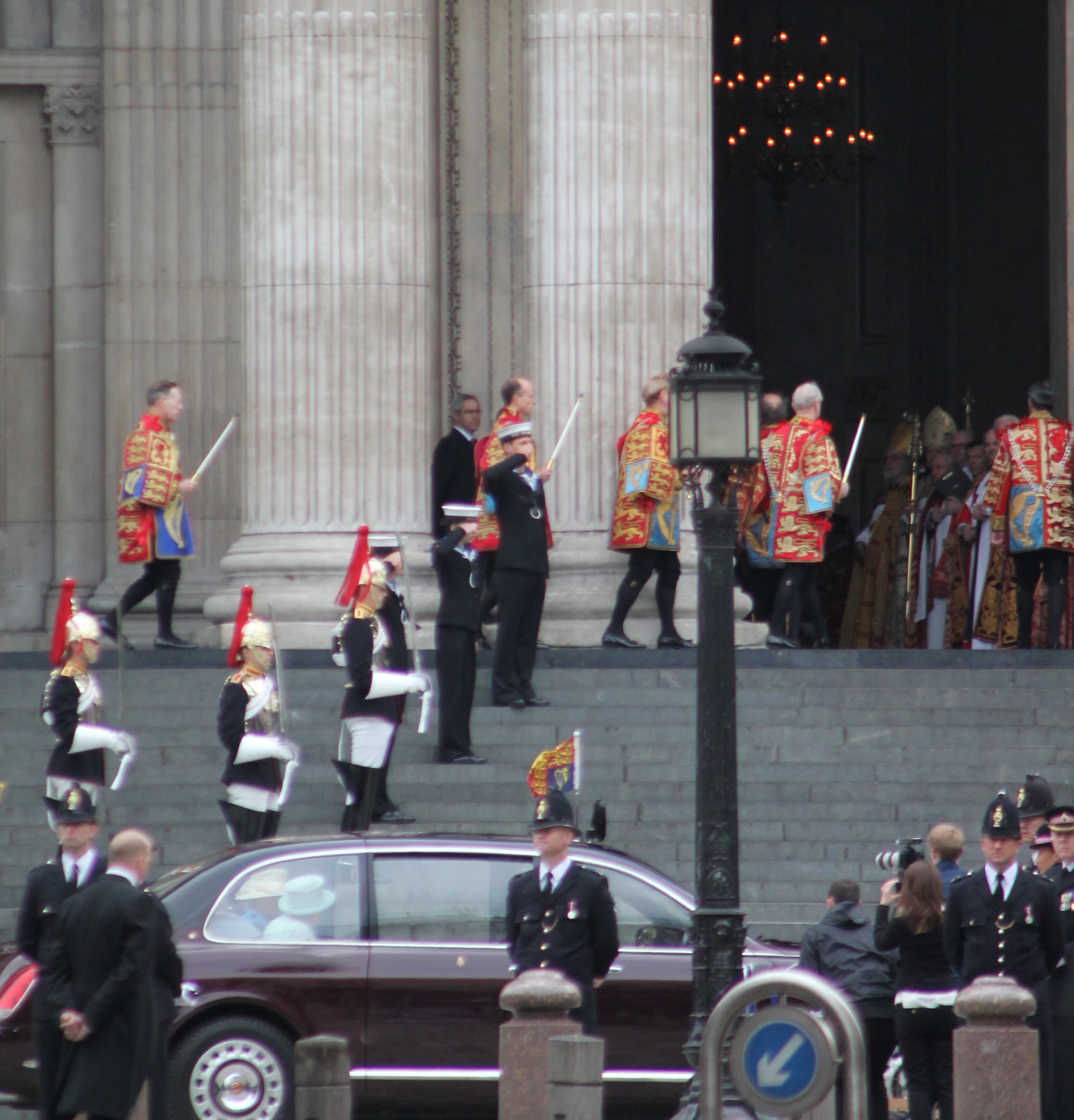
Queen Elizabeth II's car arriving at the West Steps of St Paul's Cathedral in 2012 for the National Service of Thanksgiving for her Diamond Jubilee.

A national service of thanksgiving in the United Kingdom is an act of Christian worship, generally attended by the British monarch, Great Officers of State and Ministers of the Crown, which celebrates an event of national importance. Originally it started with the intention to give thanks for victory in battle. However it evolved to celebrate occasions such as a royal jubilee, a royal wedding anniversary, or the end of a conflict. These services are usually held at St Paul's Cathedral in the City of London.

== History ==
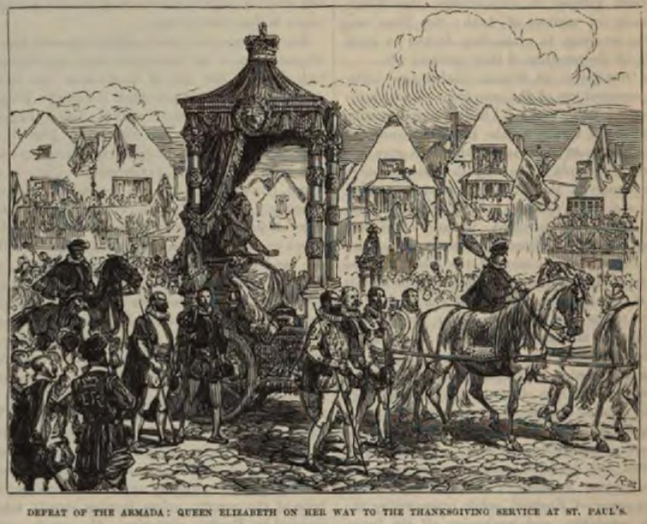
A 19th century depiction of Elizabeth I in procession to St Paul's to give thanks for the defeat of the Spanish Armada in 1588.

In the Middle Ages, services of this kind were held in one of the Chapels Royal and were attended only by the members of the royal court, while members of the House of Lords simultaneously went to Westminster Abbey and the House of Commons, to St Margaret's, Westminster, for their respective thanksgiving services. However, in 1588, Queen Elizabeth I marked the defeat of the Spanish Armada by processing in a Roman-style chariot from Somerset House to Old St Paul's for a service of public thanksgiving. On her route, the queen entered the City of London at Temple Bar, where she was met by the lord mayor and aldermen, and was offered the sword of the City as a sign of fealty, a tradition which has been maintained to the present. During the service, the queen was seated in a royal box in the north aisle, from where she could hear the sermon which was preached just outside at St Paul's Cross to a huge crowd.

The custom was revived by Queen Anne in 1702 to give thanks for victory at the Battle of Vigo Bay at the newly rebuilt cathedral. As with the Armada thanksgiving, the service was preceded by a large cavalcade, which combined with the location at St Paul's, one of Europe's largest churches and England's first new-built Protestant cathedral, served to emphasise national power and unity. Rather than being concealed in a royal box, the queen was seated centrally on a raised dais. Six more of these services took place, celebrating various successes in the War of the Spanish Succession, but after 1708, Queen Anne preferred to attend thanksgivings at the Chapel Royal of St James's Palace, perhaps because of her ill-health or political considerations. However she did attend perhaps the grandest of these services in 1713 which celebrated the end of the war by the Peace of Utrecht. George Frederick Handel was commissioned to compose a Te Deum for the event, the first departure from the custom that music for royal occasions should be written by the musicians of the Chapel Royal.

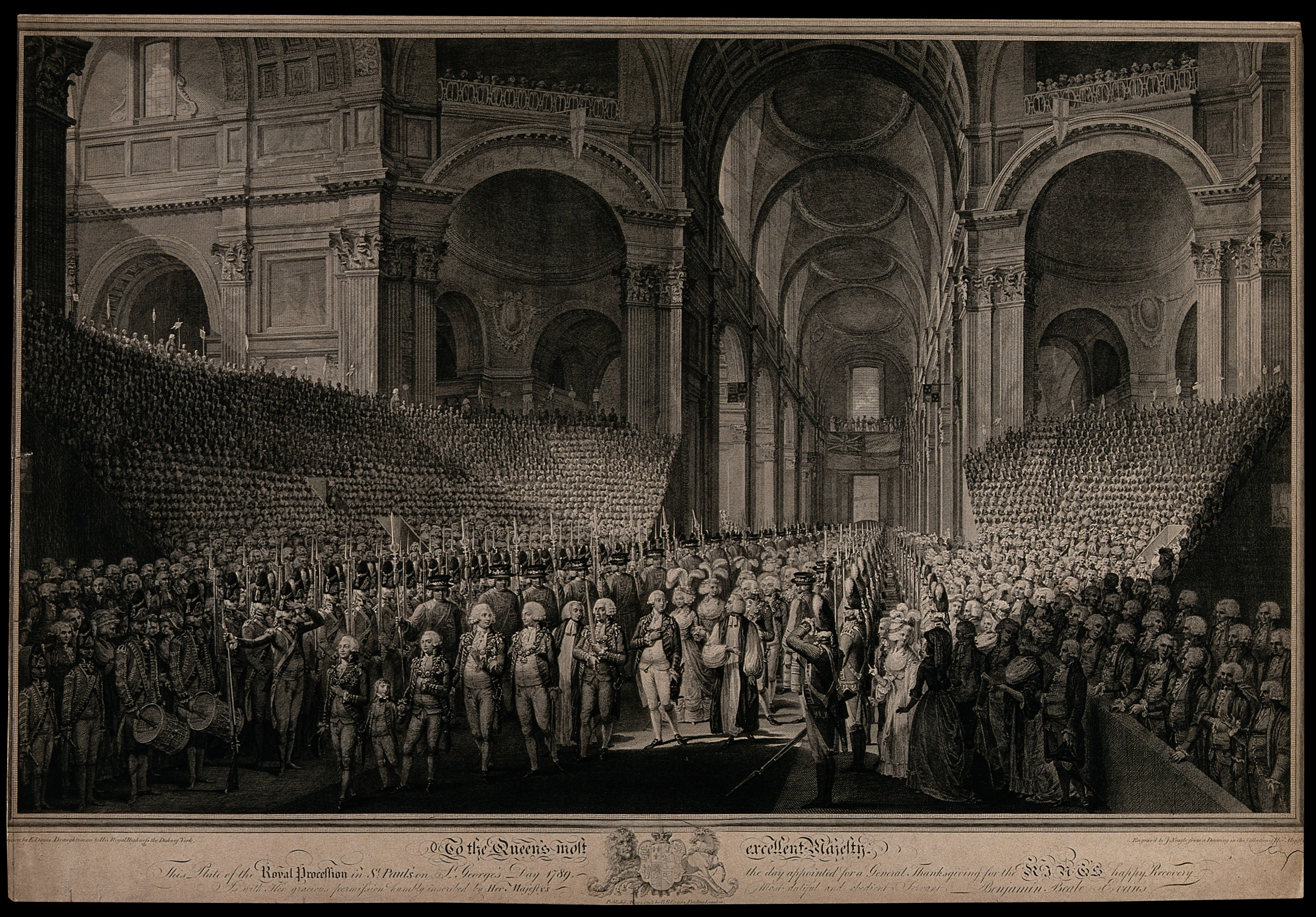
George III in St Paul's for the 1789 thanksgiving service, surrounded by 5,000 schoolchildren seated under the dome.

Early in 1789, King George III unexpectedly recovered from a debilitating illness which had plunged the country into a constitutional crisis. George himself suggested that a thanksgiving service be held at St Paul's on St George's Day, 23 April. The short length of time available for preparation was exacerbated by the fact that nobody in office could remember the previous event in Anne's reign, 74 years earlier, and a hasty search of the archives was ordered. The royal dias used by Anne was brought out of storage and renovated. Initially, the prime minister, William Pitt the Elder, was opposed to a procession from St James's Palace for fear of anti-monarchist demonstrations, but on the day, an "immense" crowd cheered the king enthusiastically. The four-hour service started with 5,000 children from London's charity schools, seated in specially built stands under the dome, singing Psalm 100; apparently an innovation suggested by Queen Charlotte. A further thanksgiving service at St Paul's was arranged to celebrate George's Golden Jubilee on accession day, 25 October 1809, but the ailing king decided to attend a private service at St George's Chapel, Windsor instead. The St Paul's service was attended by the Lord Mayor and Corporation of London, who were nevertheless cheered on by large crowds.

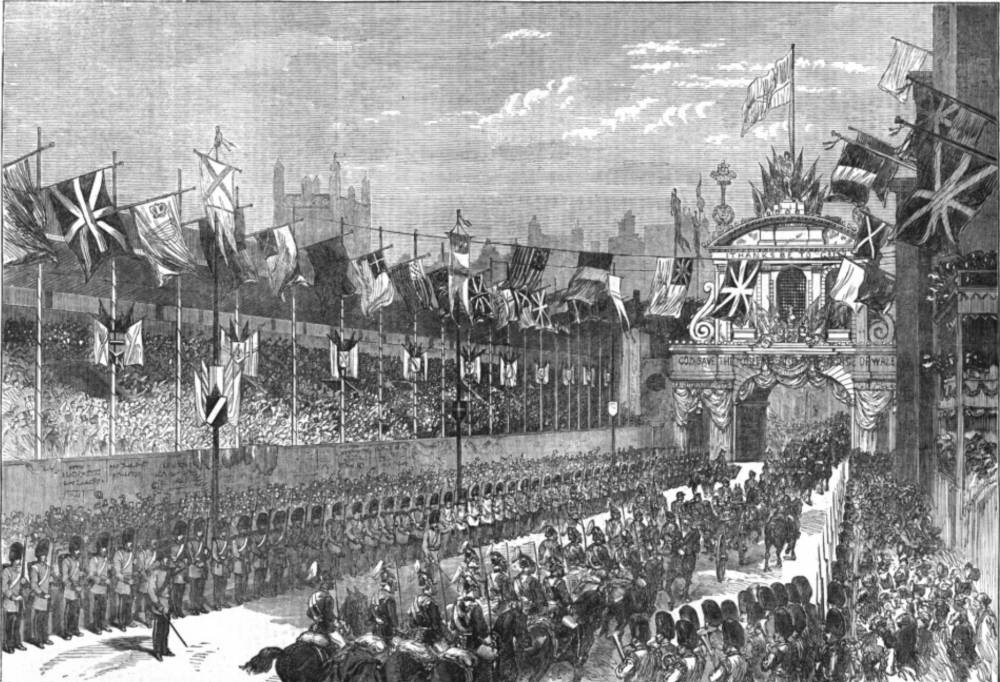
The procession passes through Temple Bar on the way to the 1872 Thanksgiving Service.

At the start of the 1870s, there was an upsurge of republicanism in the United Kingdom. This was fuelled by a number of factors; Queen Victoria's neglect of public duties due to her extended mourning for Albert, Prince Consort, the wayward behaviour of Edward, Prince of Wales and finally a dispute about the large dowry allotted to Victoria, Princess Royal from public funds; all of this against the background of the Paris Commune. The recovery of Edward from a bout of typhoid fever was seized upon by the prime minister, William Gladstone, as an opportunity to improve the image of the royal family, and the queen and prince reluctantly agreed to a thanksgiving service at St Paul's. The service and carriage procession from Buckingham Palace was a resounding success, to the surprise of the queen who wrote that she had been "deeply touched and gratified... by the immense enthusiasm and affection exhibited". This was later considered to be a turning point in the fortunes of the British monarchy, and republican sentiment was marginalised for many decades. However, as Victoria's Golden Jubilee approached, the queen made it clear to her new prime minister Lord Salisbury, that she intended to have a more modest service at Westminster Abbey, to which Salisbury, with an eye on expenditure, was happy to agree.

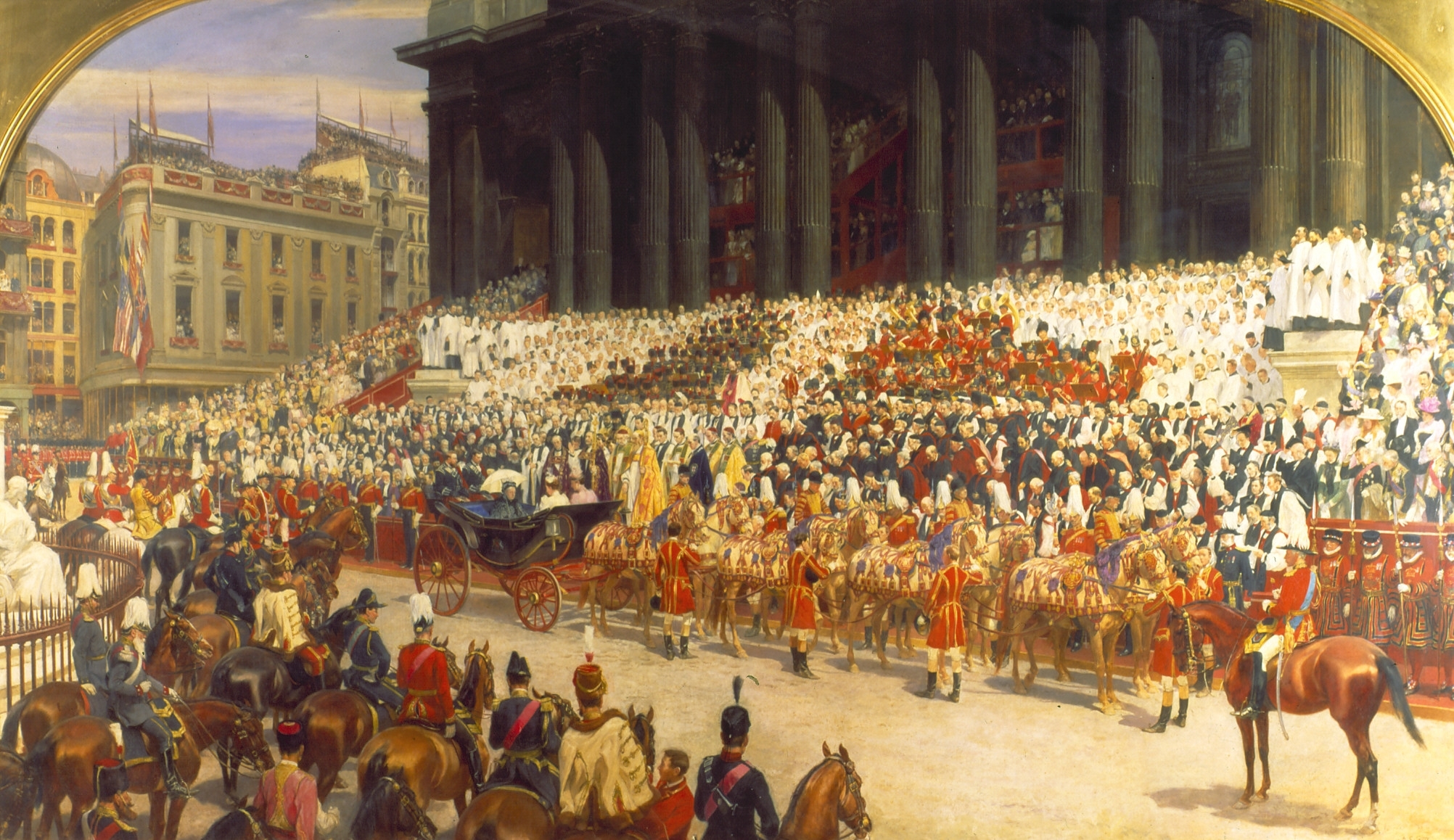
Queen Victoria's 1897 Diamond Jubilee thanksgiving service, held outside at the West Steps of St Paul's.

Victoria's Diamond Jubilee in 1897 was of a different order. Conceived by Colonial Secretary Joseph Chamberlain to be a great imperial extravaganza, the driving force behind the event was Reginald Brett (later Viscount Esher), the permanent secretary to the Office of Works. A return to St Paul's allowed for a grand procession through the capital, however it was found that the elderly queen would be unable to manage the steps of the cathedral. A proposal to manhandle the royal carriage into the church were discarded in favour of holding a short service outside the west front. The clergy, choir and important guests were arrayed on the cathedral steps, while the queen remained seated in her carriage. Despite her debility, the queen endured a lengthy carriage ride which on its return, crossed London Bridge and passed through the deprived district of Southwark.

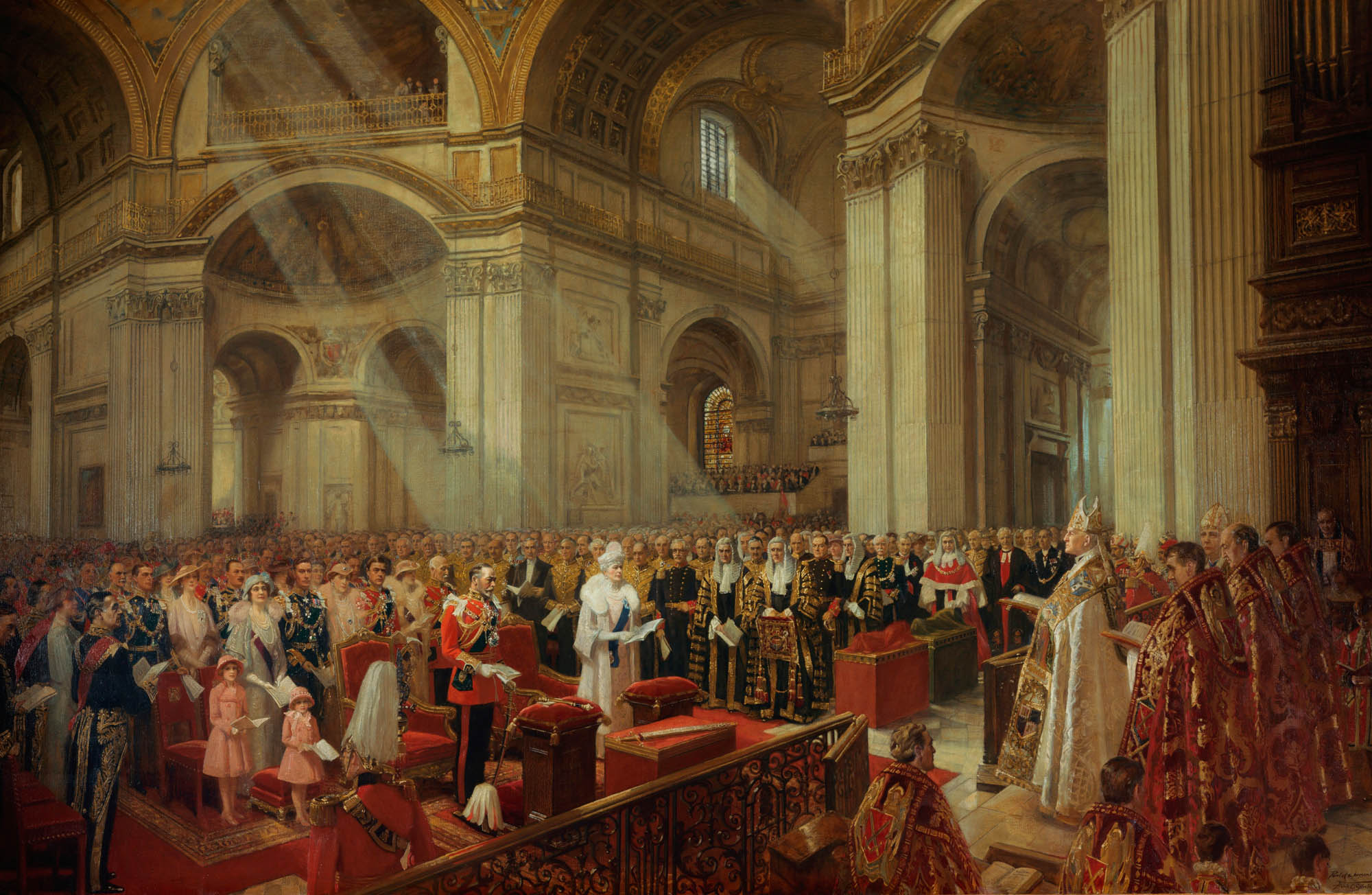
The Service of Thanksgiving for the Silver Jubilee of George V in 1935.

Thanksgiving services have remained popular spectacles; the 1977 Silver Jubilee of Elizabeth II attracted an estimated crowd of one million spectators along the route of the procession, in which the queen rode in the Gold State Coach, while the British television audience for the 2012 Diamond Jubilee service was 4.5 million viewers for the BBC alone, the event was also broadcast by ITV News and Sky News.

== Liturgy ==
The liturgy of services in London are conducted by the Church of England and follow the format of the Anglican Daily Office from the Book of Common Prayer. They usually include the singing of the Te Deum, a canticle which has traditionally been used in Western Christianity for national rejoicing. The service may also include a Psalm, an anthem, readings from the Bible and a sermon. Services in Edinburgh are under the auspices of the Church of Scotland. Although these services are conducted by the established churches in England and Scotland, efforts towards the inclusion of other Christian denominations and other faiths started for the thanksgiving service in 1872 when invitations were sent to representatives of the Nonconformist churches, Cardinal Manning, the Catholic Archbishop of Westminster and Hermann Adler, the Chief Rabbi. Recent developments have included the active participation of faiths and beliefs other than Christianity; at the 2023 Honours of Scotland service in Edinburgh, blessings and statements of affirmation were made by representatives of Islam, Hinduism, Judaism, Tibetan Buddhism and Humanism.

== List of national thanksgiving services ==
All took place in St Paul's Cathedral unless otherwise noted.

Date	Event	Monarch	Notes
24 November 1588	Defeat of the Spanish Armada	Elizabeth I	Sermon by John Piers, the Bishop of Salisbury. Anthem, Look and bow down by William Byrd, text attributed to Queen Elizabeth.
12 November 1702	Victory at the Battle of Vigo Bay	Anne	Sermon by Jonathan Trelawny, Bishop of Exeter.
7 September 1704	Victory at the Battle of Blenheim	Anne	Sermon by William Sherlock, the Dean of St Paul's. Te Deum and Jubilate probably by Henry Purcell; three new anthems by John Blow.
27 June 1706	Victory at the Battle of Ramillies	Anne	Sermon by George Stanhope, Dean of Canterbury. Te Deum by Henry Purcell The Lord is my Strength by Jeremiah Clarke
31 December 1706	"Wonderful successes of the year"	Anne	Sermon by Gilbert Burnet, Bishop of Salisbury
1 May 1707	Acts of Union 1707	Anne	Sermon by William Talbot, Bishop of Oxford. Anthem, Behold how good and joyful by Jeremiah Clarke, John Blow and William Croft.
23 August 1708	Battle of Oudenarde	Anne	Sermon by William Fleetwood, Bishop of St Asaph. Te Deum and Jubilate by Henry Purcell; anthem, I will give thanks by William Croft.
2 July 1713	Peace of Utrecht	Anne	Utrecht Te Deum by George Frederick Handel, This is the Day by William Croft.
23 April 1789	"For the King's happy Recovery"	George III	Sermon by Beilby Porteus, Bishop of London. Music is believed to have included; Zadok the Priest, Dettingen Te Deum, Utrecht Jubilate and My heart is inditing, all by Handel.
14 December 1797	Battle of Cape St. Vincent	George III	Sermon by George Pretyman Tomline, Bishop of Lincoln.
7 July 1814	"Restoration of Peace" (the Treaty of Paris ending the War of the Sixth Coalition)	George III (represented by the Prince Regent)	Sermon by George Henry Law, Bishop of Chester
27 February 1872	"Recovery of His Royal Highness the Prince of Wales" (from typhoid fever)	Victoria	Te Deum and anthem, The Lord is my Strength, both by Sir John Goss
21 June 1887	Golden Jubilee	Victoria	At Westminster Abbey; Te Deum composed by the late Albert, Prince Consort
22 June 1897	Diamond Jubilee	Victoria	Service held outside the West Front of St Paul's so that the elderly queen could stay in her carriage: Jubilee Te Deum by Sir George Martin and Old Hundredth
8 June 1902	Peace in South Africa (the Treaty of Vereeniging ending the Second Boer War)	Edward VII	Sermon by Arthur Winnington-Ingram, Bishop of London: Boer War Te Deum by Sir Arthur Sullivan
6 July 1919	Treaty of Versailles ending the First World War	George V	Held on the West Steps of St Paul's: Thanksgiving Te Deum by Charles Macpherson
6 May 1935	Silver Jubilee of George V	George V	Te Deum by Stanley Marchant
13 May 1945	VE Day	George VI	Anthem I was glad by Sir Hubert Parry; Te Deum by Sir Charles Villiers Stanford
19 August 1945	VJ Day	George VI	Sermon by Geoffrey Fisher, Archbishop of Canterbury. Hymns, Praise, my soul, the King of heaven and Jerusalem
26 April 1948	Silver wedding anniversary of King George VI and Queen Elizabeth	George VI	At St Paul's Cathedral
24 June 1953	A National Service of Thanksgiving to mark the Coronation of Elizabeth II	Elizabeth II	At St Giles' Cathedral, Edinburgh. Sermon by James Pitt-Watson, Moderator of the General Assembly of the Church of Scotland. Presentation of the Honours of Scotland.
20 November 1972	Silver wedding anniversary of Queen Elizabeth II and the Duke of Edinburgh	Elizabeth II	At Westminster Abbey.
7 June 1977	Silver Jubilee of Elizabeth II	Elizabeth II	Sermon by Donald Coggan, Archbishop of CanterburyCoronation Te Deum, William Walton; Psalm 121 by Barry Rose, anthem I was glad by Hubert Parry.
15 July 1980	Queen Elizabeth The Queen Mother's 80th Birthday	Elizabeth II	Sermon by Robert Runcie, Archbishop of Canterbury: Jubilate by Benjamin Britten.
26 July 1982	Liberation of the Falkland Islands	Elizabeth II	Sermon by Robert Runcie, Archbishop of Canterbury.
4 May 1991	End of the Gulf War	Elizabeth II	At Glasgow Cathedral; sermon by John Habgood, Archbishop of York.
20 November 1997	Golden wedding anniversary of Queen Elizabeth II and the Duke of Edinburgh	Elizabeth II	At Westminster Abbey.
11 July 2000	Queen Elizabeth The Queen Mother's 100th Birthday	Elizabeth II	Sermon by George Carey, Archbishop of Canterbury.
4 June 2002	Golden Jubilee of Elizabeth II	Elizabeth II	Psalm 150 by John Rutter; anthem, Behold, O God our defender by John Scott.
15 June 2006	Queen's 80th Birthday	Elizabeth II	
19 November 2007	Diamond wedding anniversary of Queen Elizabeth II and the Duke of Edinburgh	Elizabeth II	At Westminster Abbey.
5 June 2012	Diamond Jubilee of Elizabeth II	Elizabeth II	Sermon by Rowan Williams, Archbishop of Canterbury. Te Deum in G by Ralph Vaughan Williams; anthems, O Thou, the Central Orb by Charles Wood and The Call of Wisdom by Will Todd.
10 June 2016	Queen's 90th Birthday	Elizabeth II	Sermon by Justin Welby, Archbishop of Canterbury: Jubilate by William Walton; Psalm 47 by Ralph Vaughan Williams; anthem, I love all beauteous things by Judith Weir.
3 June 2022	Platinum Jubilee of Elizabeth II	Elizabeth II (represented by the Prince of Wales)	Sermon by Stephen Cottrell, Archbishop of York. I was glad (Psalm 122) by Hubert Parry; Psalm 24 by Joseph Barnby; Benedicite by Francis Jackson; anthem, By Wisdom by Judith Weir
12 September 2022	A Service of Thanksgiving for the Life of Her Majesty The Queen	Charles III	At St Giles' Cathedral, Edinburgh. Sermon by Iain Greenshields, Moderator of the General Assembly of the Church of Scotland.
5 July 2023	A National Service of Thanksgiving and Dedication to mark the Coronation of Charles III and Camilla	Charles III	At St Giles' Cathedral, Edinburgh. Sermon by Sally Foster-Fulton, Moderator of the General Assembly of the Church of Scotland. Presentation of the Honours of Scotland.
8 May 2025	80th Anniversary of VE Day	Charles III	At Westminster Abbey. Sermon by Stephen Cottrell, Archbishop of York. Anthems; They shall grow not old by Douglas Guest, My soul, there is a country by Hubert Parry and God is our hope and strength by John Rutter.
