= List of members of the Council of Keble College, Oxford =

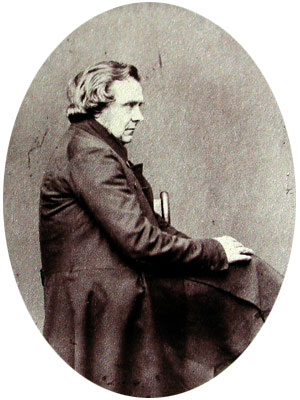
Samuel Wilberforce, Bishop of Oxford and then of Winchester, served on the Council of Keble College from 1870 to 1873; this photograph was taken by Lewis Carroll.

Keble College, one of the colleges of the University of Oxford, was established by public subscription in 1868 as a memorial to the clergyman John Keble. He was one of the leaders of the Oxford Movement, whose members were often called "Tractarians"; they aimed to reform the Church of England by reasserting its links with the early Catholic church. The college was incorporated by royal charter dated 6 June 1870. Under its terms, the governance of the college was in the hands of the Warden (the head of the college) and a council of nine to twelve members; the Warden could veto almost any decision of the council and so was in a strong position. Other Oxford colleges, in contrast, were run by the head of the college and the Fellows. By keeping matters relating to religion and the college's internal affairs in the hands of the council, rather than college academics (termed Tutors at Keble during this period), the founders hoped to maintain Keble's religious position as "a bastion of 'orthodox' Anglican teaching" against the opponents of Tractarianism. The council even had power to move the college away from Oxford (subject to the consent of the Visitor, the Archbishop of Canterbury) if it transpired that Oxford was not a suitable home.

In total, 54 men served on the council, 11 of whom were college alumni; in 1903, Arthur Winnington-Ingram (Bishop of London) became the first former Keble student to join the council. Appointment was for life or until resignation rather than for a fixed term; the council had power to fill vacancies. The first members were drawn from the committee of the Keble Memorial Fund whose work had raised the money to build the college. The council met three times per year, including a meeting on St Mark's Day (25 April) – this was not only John Keble's birthday but the date on which the foundation stone was laid in 1868, and so was adopted by the college for commemorations and celebrations.

Most of the members of the council came from outside the college, and many did not have other continuing links with the university. It has been described as "an external Council of ecclesiastical worthies". There were often arguments during meetings about the future direction of the college when Edward Stuart Talbot was Warden (from the college's foundation until 1888). Over time, the Tutors came to have a greater influence on the direction of the college, a change recognised in 1930 when the council ceded control of internal administration and academic matters to the Warden and Fellows (as the Tutors were then retitled). It retained management of finances and ecclesiastical patronage, until Harry Carpenter (Warden from 1939 to 1955) persuaded the council to transfer its remaining powers to the Warden and Fellows. This placed the college "on a constitutional par with the older colleges of the University." The council ceased to exist after 9 April 1952, the date on which new statutes of the college that placed full management in the hands of the Warden and Fellows were approved by the Queen in Council.

== Council members ==
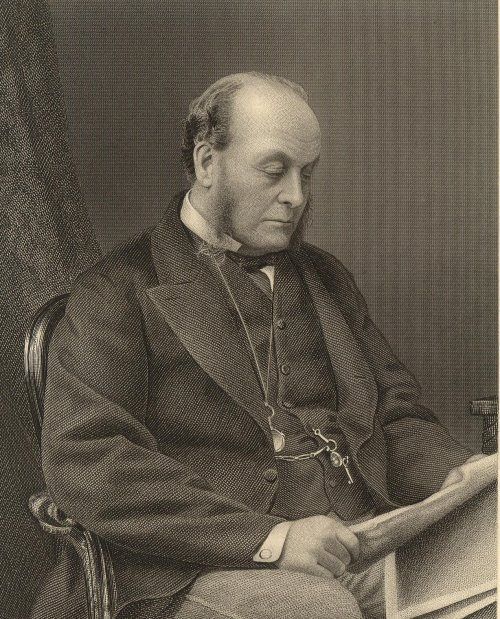
Gathorne Gathorne-Hardy, 1st Earl of Cranbrook, a member of the council from 1870 to 1898

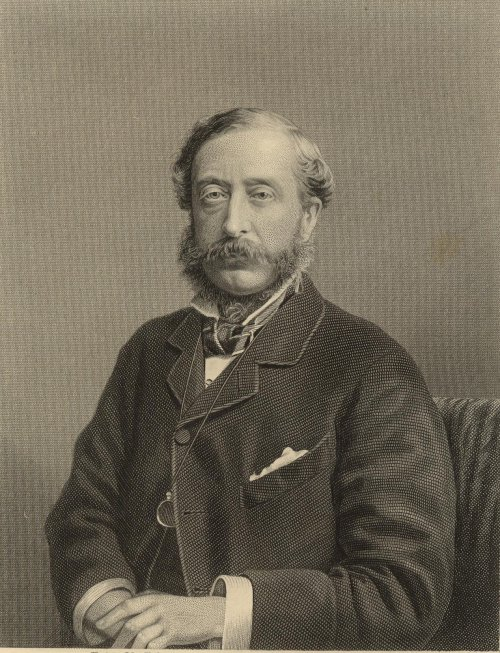
Henry Herbert, 4th Earl of Carnarvon, a council member from 1870 to 1882

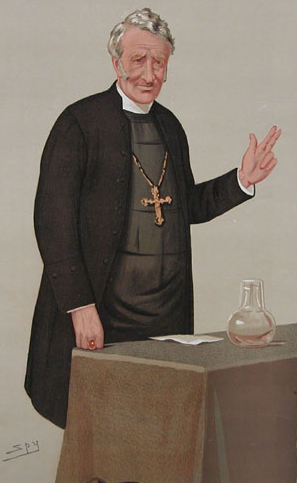
Edward King, Bishop of Lincoln and a council member from 1885 to 1910

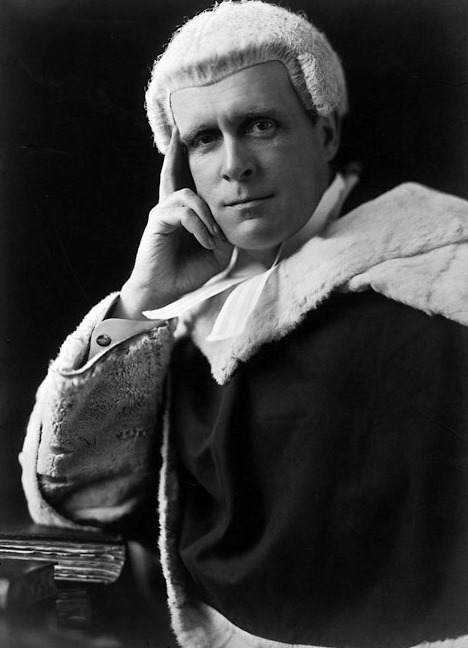
John Sankey, 1st Viscount Sankey, who was Lord Chancellor from 1929 to 1935, was a council member from 1927 to 1948.

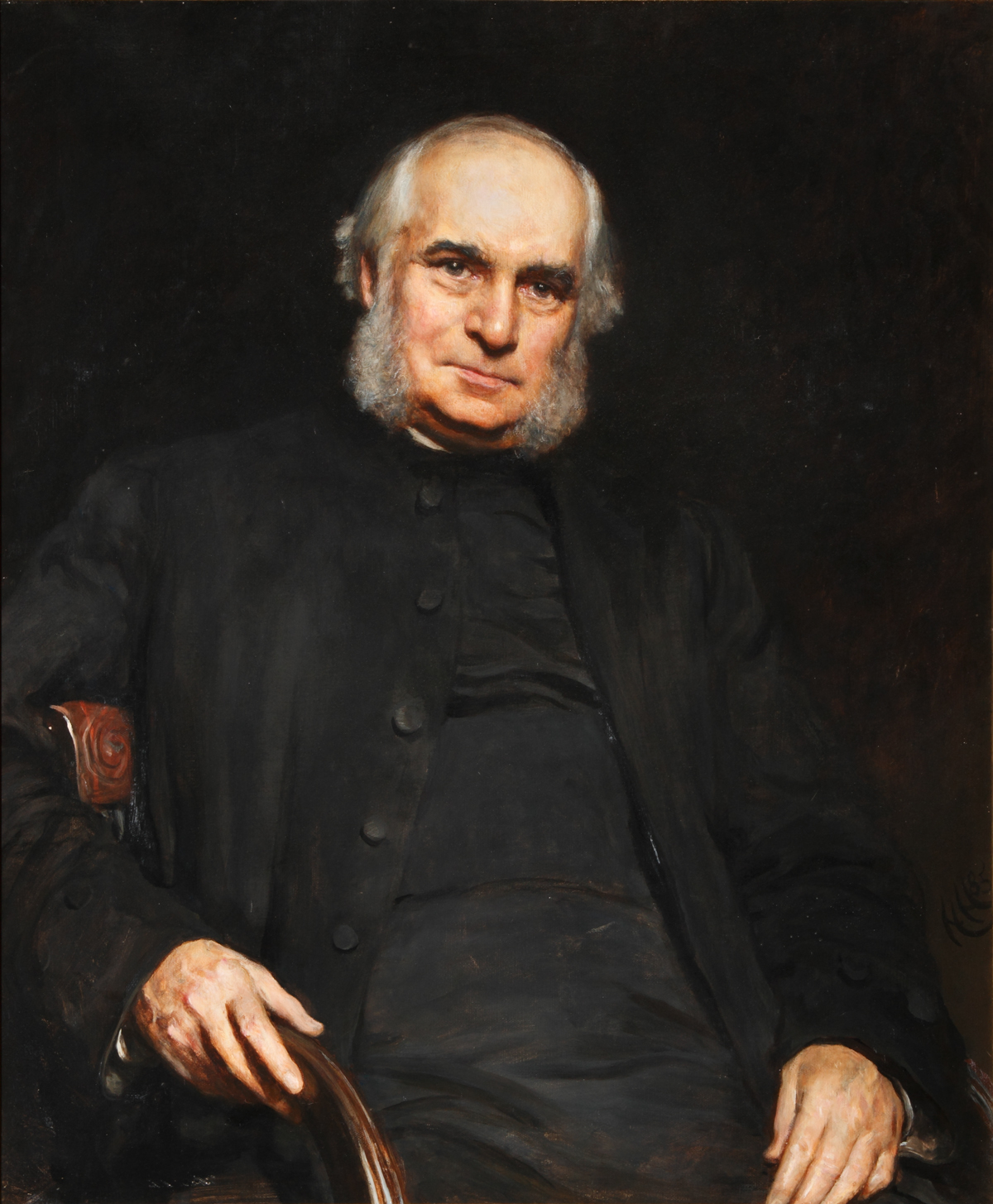
William Stubbs, a member of the council from 1890 to 1901

Key

- Those members of the council who were Old Members of the college are marked in colour and with (OM) after their name: Cyril Garbett (OM).
- All academic appointments are at the University of Oxford, unless otherwise stated.

Members of the Council of Keble College, Oxford
| Name | Start | End | Notes |
|---|---|---|---|
| Mountague Bernard | 1870 | 1882 | Chichele Professor of Public International Law (1859–74); Fellow of All Souls College (1870–82) |
| Alfred Bisdee (OM) | 1950 | 1952 | Anglican priest, who was an honorary canon of Christ Church Cathedral, Oxford |
| William Bright | 1870 | 1901 | Regius Professor of Ecclesiastical History (1868–1901) |
| Sir John Buchanan-Riddell | 1899 | 1924 | Barrister; High Sheriff of Northumberland (1897); father of Sir Walter Buchanan-Riddell (also a member of the council) |
| Sir Walter Buchanan-Riddell | 1923 | 1934 | Principal of Hertford College (1922–29); son of Sir John Buchanan-Riddell (also a member of the council) |
| Frederick Bulley | 1880 | 1885 | President of Magdalen College (1855–85) |
| Vincent Coles | 1910 | 1924 | Principal of Pusey House (1897–1909) |
| Christopher Eastwood | 1937 | 1952 | Assistant Under-Secretary of State for the Colonies (1947–52 and 1954–56) |
| Cyril Garbett (OM) | 1924 | 1950 | Bishop of Southwark (1919–32); Bishop of Winchester (1932–42); Archbishop of York (1942–55) |
| Hugh Gascoyne-Cecil, 1st Baron Quickswood | 1898 | 1952 | Fellow of Hertford College (1892–36); MP for Greenwich (1895–1906) and for Oxford University (1910–37); raised to the peerage in 1941 |
| Gathorne Gathorne-Hardy, 1st Earl of Cranbrook | 1870 | 1898 | Home Secretary (1867–68); Secretary of State for War (1874–78); Secretary of State for India (1878–80) |
| Hucks Gibbs, 1st Baron Aldenham | 1873 | 1907 | A Director of the Bank of England (1853–1901, Governor 1875–77); MP for the City of London (1891–92); raised to the peerage in 1896; a nephew of the wealthy trader William Gibbs (owner of Tyntesfield) who paid for the construction of the chapel |
| John Arthur Gibbs (OM) | 1925 | 1946 | Merchant banker with Anthony Gibbs and Sons from 1882; became a partner of the firm in 1897 |
| Vicary Gibbs | 1906 | 1921 | MP for St Albans (1892–1904) |
| Henry Herbert, 4th Earl of Carnarvon | 1870 | 1882 | Secretary of State for the Colonies (1866–67 and 1874–78); Lord Lieutenant of Ireland (1885–86) |
| Nugent Hicks | 1934 | 1942 | Dean of the college (1901–09); Bishop of Gibraltar (1927–33); Bishop of Lincoln (1933–42) |
| Sir Samuel Hoare | 1919 | 1922 | MP for Chelsea (1910–44); Home Secretary (1937–39) |
| John Johnston (OM) | 1914 | 1923 | Principal of Cuddesdon College, an Anglican theological college (1895–1913) |
| Edward King | 1885 | 1910 | Regius Professor of Pastoral Theology (1873–85); Bishop of Lincoln (1885–1910) |
| Francis Leighton | 1871 | 1880 | Warden of All Souls College (1858–81) |
| Henry Liddon | 1870 | 1890 | Dean Ireland's Professor of the Exegesis of Holy Scripture (1870–82) |
| Walter Lock | 1885 | 1897 | Fellow of Magdalen College (1869–92); Dean Ireland's Professor of the Exegesis of Holy Scripture (1895–1919); Lady Margaret Professor of Divinity (1919–27); third Warden of Keble (1897–1920) |
| Frederick Lygon, 6th Earl Beauchamp | 1870 | 1891 | Fellow of All Souls College (1852–56); Lord Steward of the Household (1874–80); vice-president of the Keble Memorial Fund, and a "key member" of the council, who was "consulted at every stage" |
| Henry Longueville Mansel | 1870 | 1871 | Waynflete Professor of Metaphysical Philosophy (1855–67); Regius Professor of Ecclesiastical History (1867–68); Dean of St Paul's (1868–71) |
| Frederick Matheson (OM) | 1921 | 1942 | Dean of the college (1914–21); Dean of Carlisle (1938–42) |
| Peter Medd | 1870 | 1908 | Fellow of University College (1852–77) |
| Robert Moberly | 1901 | 1903 | Regius Professor of Pastoral Theology (1892–1903) |
| Frank Morgan | 1923 | 1935 | Private tutor in mod. History, Lecturer in Mod. History, Tutor in Mod. History (1895–1918); Secretary of the Representative Body of the Church in Wales (1918–35); also a Governor of the University College of Wales, Aberystwyth |
| Robert Mortimer (OM) | 1950 | 1952 | Regius Professor of Moral and Pastoral Theology (1944–49); Bishop of Exeter (1949–73) |
| William Newbolt | 1901 | 1930 | Principal of Ely Theological College (1887–90) |
| Robert Ottley | 1908 | 1920 | Regius Professor of Moral and Pastoral Theology (1903–33) |
| Roundell Palmer, 3rd Earl of Selborne | 1950 | 1952 | MP for Newton (1910–18) and for Aldershot (1918–40); inherited title of Earl of Selborne in 1942; Minister of Economic Warfare (1942–45) |
| Edward Page (OM) | 1935 | 1952 | Chairman of the Diocese of Bath and Wells Board of Finance (1936); High Sheriff of Somerset (1947) |
| Henry Pellew | 1870 | 1873 | Honorary Secretary to the Keble Memorial Fund until 1873, when he moved to the United States (later becoming a US citizen); inherited the title of Viscount Exmouth shortly before his death |
| Edward Bouverie Pusey | 1870 | 1880 | Regius Professor of Hebrew (1828–82); a leader of the Oxford Movement |
| George Russell | 1908 | 1919 | MP for Aylesbury (1880–85) and for Biggleswade (1892–95); Under-Secretary of State for India (1892–94); Under-Secretary of State for the Home Department (1894–95) |
| William Sackville-West | 1882 | 1905 | Also the college's bursar (1871–76); previously Lieutenant-Colonel of the Grenadier Guards |
| John Sankey, 1st Viscount Sankey | 1927 | 1948 | High Court Judge (1914–28); Lord Justice of Appeal (1928–29); Lord Chancellor (1929–35); raised to the peerage as Baron Sankey (1929) and then Viscount Sankey (1932) |
| John Shaw-Stewart | 1870 | 1900 | Honorary Treasurer of the Keble Memorial Fund; the college's bursar (1876–80); a magistrate in Renfrewshire and Middlesex |
| Frederick Spurling | 1897 | 1914 | Sub-Warden of the college (1897–1906) |
| William Stubbs | 1890 | 1901 | Regius Professor of Modern History (1866–84); Bishop of Chester (1884–89); Bishop of Oxford (1889–1901) |
| Edward Keble Talbot | 1924 | 1949 | Son of Edward Stuart Talbot (first Warden and a member of the council); Superior of the Community of the Resurrection, Mirfield (1922–40) |
| Edward Stuart Talbot | 1893 | 1934 | First Warden of the college (1870–88); Bishop of Rochester (1895–1905); Bishop of Southwark (1905–11); Bishop of Winchester (1911–23); father of Edward Keble Talbot (also a member of the council) |
| Sir George Talbot | 1900 | 1938 | Fellow of All Souls College (1886–98); High Court Judge (1923–37) |
| Francis Underhill | 1930 | 1943 | Bishop of Bath and Wells (1937–43) |
| Sir Harry Vaisey | 1939 | 1951 | High Court Judge (1944–60) |
| Richard Walters (OM) | 1950 | 1952 | Chartered accountant; Honorary Secretary of the college's Appeal Fund (1951–68) |
| William Wand | 1944 | 1952 | Archbishop of Brisbane (1934–43); Bishop of Bath and Wells (1943–45); Bishop of London (1945–55) |
| Richard Temple West | 1882 | 1893 | High Church Anglican priest, who was a Student of Christ Church ("Student" being the term at Christ Church for Fellows); became vicar of St Mary Magdalene, Paddington |
| Samuel Wilberforce | 1870 | 1873 | Bishop of Oxford (1845–69); Bishop of Winchester (1869–73) |
| Roger Wilson (OM) | 1950 | 1952 | Bishop of Wakefield (1949–58); Bishop of Chichester (1958–74) |
| Arthur Winnington-Ingram (OM) | 1903 | 1946 | Bishop of London (1901–39) |
| Charles Wood, 2nd Viscount Halifax | 1880 | 1919 | President of the English Church Union (1869–1919, 1931–34); father of Edward Wood (also a member of the council) |
| Edward Wood, 1st Baron Irwin | 1919 | 1926 | Son of Charles Wood (also a member of the council); Fellow of All Souls College (1903–33); MP for Ripon (1910–25); Viceroy of India (1926–31); Secretary of State for Foreign Affairs (1938–40); raised to the peerage as 1st Baron Irwin in 1925 before succeeding his father as 3rd Viscount Halifax in 1934; further ennobled as 1st Earl of Halifax in 1944 |
