= William Newbolt =

The Reverend William Newbolt
- Born: William Charles Edmund Newbolt; 14 August 1844; Somerton, Somerset, England
- Died: 12 September 1930 (aged 86); London, England
- Spouse: Fanny Charlotte (m. 1870; died 1923)

Ecclesiastical career
- Religion: Christianity (Anglican)
- Church: Church of England
- Ordained: 1868 (deacon); 1869 (priest)

Academic background
- Education: Pembroke College, Oxford
- Influences: Edward King; Henry Liddon; Edward Bouverie Pusey; Edward Thring

Academic work
- Discipline: Theology
- School or tradition: Tractarianism
- Institutions: Ely Theological College

William Charles Edmund Newbolt (1844–1930) was an English Anglican priest and theologian. He was a prominent Tractarian and headed Ely Theological College in Ely, Cambridgeshire, between 1887 and 1890, when he became a canon of St Paul's Cathedral.

== Life ==
Newbolt was born 14 August 1844 in Somerton, a small town in Somerset. His father, also called William, was the rector of the Church of St Michael and All Angels. Newbolt was educated locally and at Uppingham School in Rutland. He then studied at Pembroke College, Oxford, obtaining a third-class degree in literae humaniores (classics) in 1867. He did not formally study for ordination, but spent a further year in Oxford reading before being ordained deacon in 1868 and priest in 1869.

While at Oxford, Newbolt was influenced by the Tractarians, also known as the Oxford Movement, a group aiming to reform the Church of England by asserting its Catholic heritage and its links with the early church. He followed the teaching of clerics such as Edward Pusey, Henry Liddon and Edward King. After his ordination, he was a curate in Wantage, Berkshire, in one of the prominent Tractarian parishes of the day. After marrying in 1870, he became vicar of Dymock, Gloucestershire, on the nomination of Frederick Lygon, 6th Earl Beauchamp, a leading high-church Anglican; in 1877, Beauchamp's further nomination saw him move to Malvern Link, Worcestershire. Like Pusey, Liddon, King, and Beauchamp, Newbolt was to become a member of the Council of Keble College, Oxford, founded in memory of John Keble, a prominent Tractarian; Newbolt served from 1901 until his death.

The Dean of Worcester, Lord Alwyne Compton, became Bishop of Ely in 1886, and in the following year asked Newbolt to become principal of Ely Theological College, which trained clergy in accordance with Tractarian principles. His time at Ely has been described as "the most important work of his life". In 1890, he succeeded Liddon as a canon of St Paul's Cathedral; he remained there until his death on 12 September 1930 in London. He was a noted preacher and took great care of the spiritual welfare of fellow clergy, publishing a number of books of advice, as well as his memoirs (Years That Are Past, 1921).

His youngest daughter, Sophia Menella Newbolt, married the Scottish organist Charles Macpherson.
