= Charles William Hayward =

British businessman (1892–1983)

Sir Charles William Hayward CBE KStJ
- Born: 3 September 1892; Wolverhampton, England
- Died: 3 February 1983 (aged 90)
- Occupations: Businessman, investor, philanthropist
- Awards: Freedom of the City of London; Knight of the Order of Saint John; Honorary Fellow of Keble College, Oxford

Sir Charles William Hayward, CBE KStJ (3 September 1892 – 3 February 1983) was an English businessman, investor, and philanthropist.

== Early life ==
Born in 1892, Charles Hayward was the second child of John Hayward, a cycle manufacturer, and his wife Martha Mary Williams. After the early death of his father in 1894, Hayward and his sister Marion Daisy were brought up by their maternal grandmother Sarah Ann Williams (née Patten), a locksmith 'employer at home', at Church Lane, Wolverhampton. In 1908, Sarah Ann Williams (née Patten) remarried, becoming the second wife of Joseph Stevens, the father of Harry, Joe Stevens Jr., Jack, and George Stevens, who in 1909 founded A. J. Stevens & Co.

== Career ==
Hayward began his career as an engineering apprentice, setting up his own business at the age of 19. He initially manufactured engineering patterns before moving into the emerging sidecar industry. Hayward's customers included AJS, which bought his company in 1920 but retained him as Managing Director.

In 1928 Hayward moved to London to pursue a new career as a stockbroker and industrialist. He founded Electric & General Industrial Trusts Ltd. which in turn led to the formation of the Firth Cleveland Group of Companies. This eventually had 23 factories in the United Kingdom and operations in the Netherlands, West Germany, South Africa, and Australia. The Group was sold to GKN in 1970.

== Hayward Foundation ==
In 1961, Hayward set up the Hayward Foundation, which donated millions of pounds to charitable causes. It also financed the building of the Hayward Homes for the Elderly in Dunstall Road, Wolverhampton, where the Hayward family had once lived.

== Personal life ==
Hayward married Hilda Arnold in 1915 and remained so until her death in 1971. The Hilda Hayward Swimming Pool in Wolverhampton was named in remembrance of her. The couple had one son, Jack Hayward, who was born in 1923.

In December 1972, Charles Hayward married secondly Elsie Darnell George, his business partner, the former Company Secretary of Firth Cleveland. They bought the Crown Tenancy of the island of Jethou near Guernsey and lived there until Hayward's death.

Hayward died on Jethou on 3 February 1983, aged 90, and was buried in St John's churchyard, Wolverhampton.

== Honours ==
- Freeman of the City of London, 1938
- Commander of the Order of the British Empire, 1970, for his work as chairman of the Hayward Foundation
- Knight of the Order of St John, January 1973
- Honorary Fellow of Keble College, Oxford, 1973
- Knight Bachelor, 1974 New Year Honours, and knighted by HM the Queen at Buckingham Palace, 5 February 1974
