= Jack Hayward =

English businessman (1923–2015)

Sir Jack Hayward OBE
- Born: Jack Arnold Hayward; 14 June 1923; Wolverhampton, England
- Died: 13 January 2015 (aged 91); Fort Lauderdale, Florida, U.S.
- Known for: Owner of Wolverhampton Wanderers F.C. (1990–2007)
- Predecessor: Gallagher Estates
- Successor: Steve Morgan
- Father: Sir Charles Hayward

Sir Jack Arnold Hayward OBE (14 June 1923 – 13 January 2015) was an English businessman, property developer, philanthropist, and president of English football club Wolverhampton Wanderers.

== Biography ==
=== Early life ===
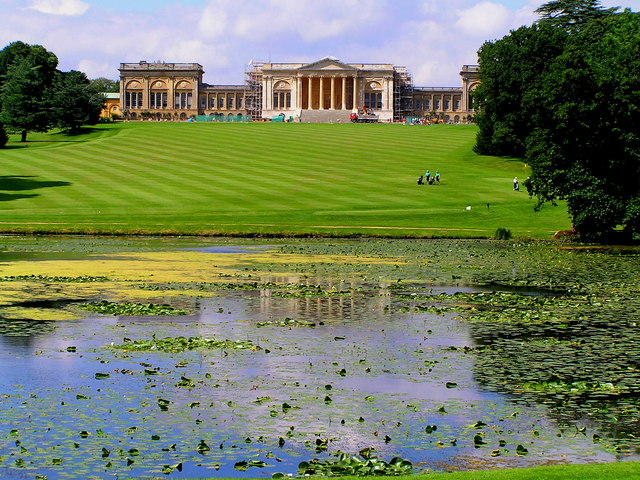
Stowe School

The only son of Charles William Hayward, an industrialist, and his wife, Hayward was born in the Whitmore Reans area of Wolverhampton. He was educated at Northaw Preparatory School and later Stowe School in Buckinghamshire.

At the outbreak of the Second World War, he cycled to Oxford to volunteer to fight, eventually joining the Royal Air Force (RAF). He received flight training in Yorkshire and Clewiston, Florida, in the United States.

He served first as a pilot officer in 671 Squadron operating under South East Asia Command (SEAC) in India, flying Dakota transporter aircraft for the supply of the 14th Army in Burma. In 1946, he was demobilised as a flight lieutenant.

=== Career ===
After demobilisation he began work in Rotary Hoes, part of the Firth Cleveland group of companies formed by his father, Sir Charles Hayward, as an agricultural equipment salesman in South Africa. In 1951, he founded the American arm of the group in New York, where he was based for five years before relocating to the Bahamas as it was a Sterling area. His father began the family involvement with the Bahamas during the 1950s, after relocating his business from the United States. Jack arrived in Grand Bahama in 1956 and became a vice-president of the Grand Bahama Port Authority, which helped promote the development of Freeport. Jack took over his father's interests in the Bahamas and continued to play an active role in Freeport.

In addition to his home in Freeport, in England he owned a farm in Sussex and in Scotland was Laird of Dunmaglass, a 14,000-acre estate near Inverness. The Sunday Times Rich List placed him as 125th richest in Britain with an estimated £160 million fortune in 2009.

=== Wolverhampton Wanderers F.C. ===
Hayward became a supporter of Wolverhampton Wanderers as a young child in the late 1920s. He first had a serious opportunity to purchase the club in 1982, when Wolves were £2.5million in debt and relegated from the First Division. He was reportedly offered 400 shares for around £40,000 but declined to buy them. When Wolves went into receivership later that year, Hayward was reportedly behind one of the offers being tabled to save the club, but it was ultimately bought by the Bhatti brothers in an unsuccessful rescue attempt fronted by former Wolves player Derek Dougan.

Hayward became the owner and chairman of Wolves, then in the Second Division following back-to-back promotions, after buying the club in May 1990 for £2.11 million. It is estimated that he spent well in excess of £70m of his personal finance on redeveloping their Molineux Stadium, writing off annual debts, and purchasing players for the club during the 17 years in which he was the owner. His reign saw seven different managers employ his resources in attempts to make the club a top-flight side. In the event, they only managed one season at the highest level (2003–04), despite his riches having enabled Wolves to invest in many players who would normally have been beyond the financial reach of non-Premier League clubs. In May 2007 it was announced that he had sold control of the club to businessman Steve Morgan for a nominal £10 fee, in exchange for a conditional £30m of investment in the club. Hayward had originally offered the club for sale in September 2003, but had struggled to find suitable takers. Morgan's takeover was formally completed on 9 August 2007. Hayward remained the life president of Wolverhampton Wanderers and was later inducted into the club's Hall of Fame.

By the time he retired as chairman at Molineux, Hayward was recognised as one of a select group of football benefactors who had spent huge fortunes of time and money on rescuing their hometown boyhood club from obscurity. Other such benefactors include Jack Walker (Blackburn Rovers), Lionel Pickering (Derby County), Steve Gibson (Middlesbrough) and Dave Whelan (Wigan Athletic).

=== Charity ===
Hayward was knighted in 1986 – adding to his 1968 OBE award – for his charitable actions, having donated money in 1969 to buy Lundy Island for the National Trust, to buy the SS Great Britain and, in 2011, £500,000 to the Vulcan to the Sky fund. He also put funds into repairing the King Edward VII Memorial Hospital on the Falkland Islands after the Falklands War and was named as the mystery benefactor of £1 million to the South Atlantic Fund to aid families of British servicemen killed or injured in that war.

He funded three international racing yachts 'Great Britain 'II and III, spent £100,000 on saving the sloop Gannet (the Royal Navy's only survivor of the transition from sail to steam) and contributed another £100,000 to help raise the Mary Rose. After befriending fellow Wulfrunian and cricketer Rachael Heyhoe Flint, he financed tours of the West Indies by the England women's cricket team in 1969–70 and 1970–71, and in 1973 sponsored the first-ever Women's Cricket World Cup, two years before the first World Cup in the men's game.

Hayward appeared in the 1970 BBC Chronicle programme; "The Great Iron Ship" which documented the recovery and subsequent voyage of the SS Great Britain from the Falklands to Bristol.

=== Political views ===
Hayward was a donor to the Liberal Party in the 1970s, having met its leader Jeremy Thorpe (one of the West Country MPs who campaigned to get Lundy Island purchased for the nation) in 1969. He backed the party in the October 1974 general election, enabling Thorpe to travel around the coast by hovercraft on speaking tours and the party to field a record number of parliamentary candidates, although only 13 were returned as MPs. Thorpe and his wife Marion were guests at Hayward's home in the Bahamas, and Thorpe offered unsuccessfully to find a buyer for Freeport in return for payment when Hayward and his colleagues were considering selling.

Hayward was awarded £50,000 in libel damages against the Sunday Telegraph after an article published in 1978 accused him of being the paymaster in the alleged conspiracy to murder Norman Scott in the Thorpe affair, of which Thorpe was cleared. In 1979, he gave evidence for the Crown in court when Thorpe was implicated in the affair, letters from Thorpe that Hayward had kept being among the exhibits.

In a 2003 interview with Sathnam Sanghera, Hayward said of his political views, "If I had my way, I'd form my own party far more right-wing than Margaret Thatcher. I'd bring back National Service, the Scaffold, the cat o' nine tails, the Empire—places like Sierra Leone and Nigeria were so much better off under British rule than they are now." When Sanghera asked him why he had thus supported the Liberal Party, he replied, "Well, I used to say, 'I don't want anything to do with Europe.' And Jeremy [Thorpe] used to say, 'My dear fella, if we joined Europe, with our expertise on how to run an empire, we'll be in charge of Europe! We will be the master race!' And I would say, 'How much do you want?' Also, I felt sorry for them."

=== Style ===
Hayward was nicknamed "Union Jack" in the Bahamas media for his British patriotism. He imported 10 red London buses to Freeport and was permitted by the General Post Office to install British-style red telephone and pillar boxes. Visiting seamen from the Royal Navy were always given dinner at a local restaurant “with the compliments of Sir Jack”. Back in Britain, Hayward drove a Range Rover bearing the bumper sticker: “Buy abroad — sack a Brit”. In Who's Who, he declared his recreations as, mainly, "promoting British endeavours, mainly in sport...protecting the British landscape, keeping all things bright, beautiful and British".

With his crumpled clothes and pockets stuffed with bits of paper, it was observed of Hayward that he looked “more like an absent-minded retired geography teacher than one of the richest men in the world”. He relaxed by watching cricket — he was a life member of Surrey County Cricket Club — and taking part in amateur dramatics — he built a modern theatre at Freeport for the local Players’ Guild, of which he was a leading actor. He banned non-British vehicles from his estate in Sussex and refused to drink French wine or mineral water.

=== Family ===
Hayward married Jean Mary Forder in 1948 and had two sons and a daughter Emma Cameron . Both his sons have also been involved with Wolverhampton Wanderers.

Hayward was awarded the freedom of the City of Wolverhampton on 9 July 2003.

In January 2011, Hayward was in a court battle for over £100 million of his personal fortune, after being sued by his daughter, elder son and six of his grandchildren after they had been removed as beneficiaries from trusts set up by him. The fallout between Hayward and his family started over the £10 sale of Wolverhampton Wanderers F.C. to Steve Morgan.

Hayward died on 13 January 2015 in Fort Lauderdale, Florida, aged 91.

== Legacy ==
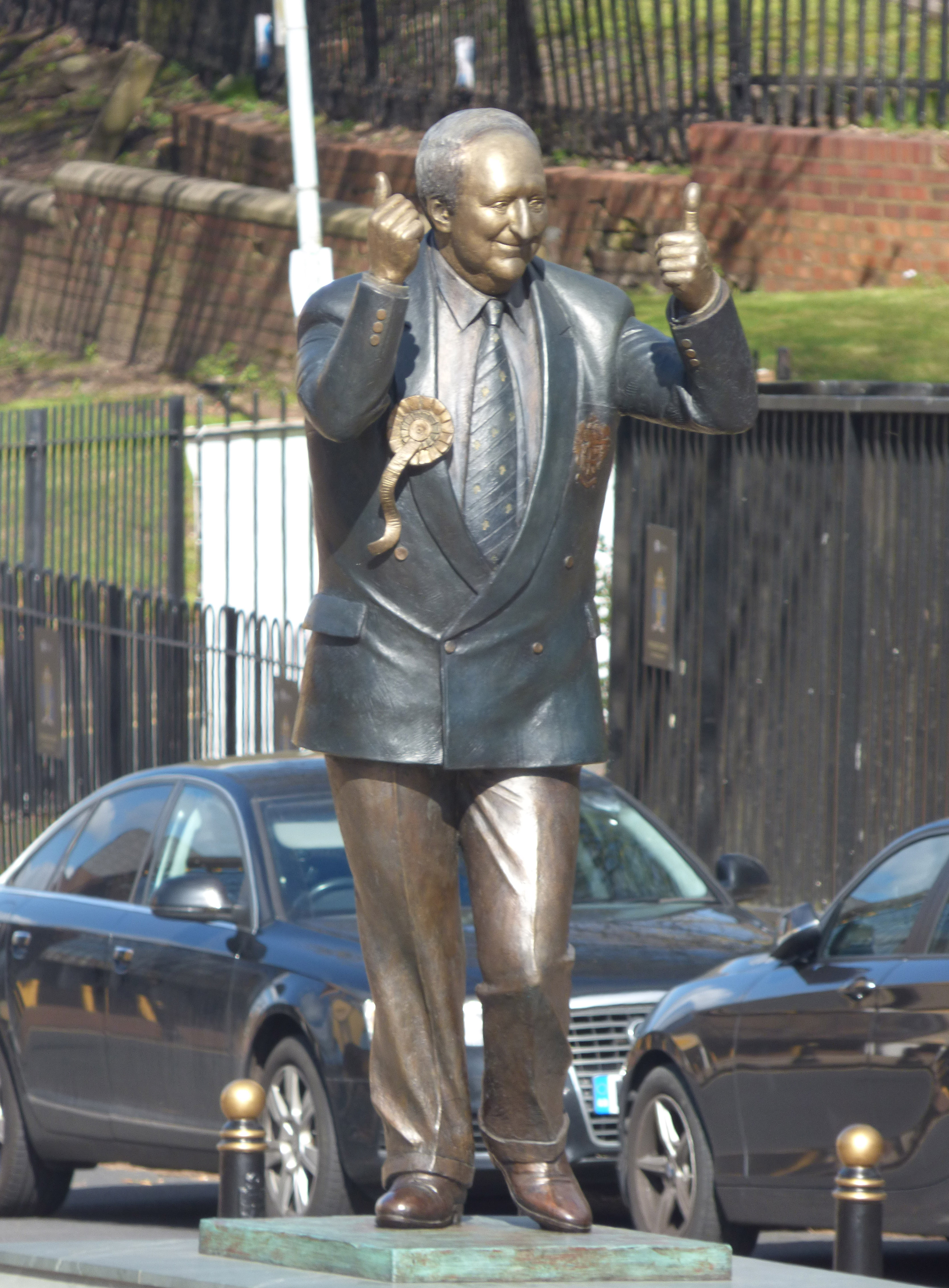
Sir Jack Hayward statue outside The Molineux

The Sir Jack Hayward High School in Freeport, Bahamas, was named after him in 1998. Wolverhampton Wanderers' training complex at Compton is also named after him, as is Jack Hayward Way, a street beside the Molineux ground, previously Molineux Way, that was renamed in commemoration of his 80th birthday in 2003.

The Grand Bahama Highway Bridge is to be renamed the Sir Jack Hayward Bridge. Hayward had campaigned for its building for 10 years before it was launched with a contract signing ceremony in May 2014 at which he was present. The bridge was commissioned in March 2016.

The South Bank of Molineux, known as the Jack Harris Stand at the time, was renamed the Sir Jack Hayward Stand after his death.

== See also ==
- List of people from Wolverhampton
- Dunmaglass Shooting Estate
