= Frederick Spurling =

The Rev. Frederick William Spurling (3 February 1844 – 14 June 1914) was a British Anglican priest, university academic and theological writer.

Spurling was educated at St Paul's School, London, and then won a scholarship to Wadham College, Oxford, obtaining a first-class degree in Literae Humaniores in 1866. After graduating, he was a college lecturer at Wadham in 1867 and 1868, before becoming an assistant master at Westminster School and Rugby School (1869 and 1871 respectively). In 1874, he returned to Oxford as a lecturer at Brasenose College, becoming a Tutor at Keble College, Oxford, in 1875. He was appointed as a member of the Governing Council of Keble College in 1897. He left Keble College in 1906 and was appointed as a residentiary canon of Chester Cathedral in 1907, having been an honorary canon there since 1899. He published a commentary on the Book of Joshua. He died on 14 June 1914, leaving a wife and five children, including the cryptanalyst Claribel Spurling.
