= Henry Ley (organist) =

English organist and composer (1887 - 1962)

Henry George Ley FRCM HonRAM (30 December 1887 – 24 August 1962) was an English organist, composer, and music teacher.

== Early life and education ==
Born in Chagford, Devon, Ley was the son of the Rev. Gerald Lewis Henry Ley and Beatrice Emma Hayter-Hames. His father, his maternal grandfather, and several other maternal relatives served as Rector of Chagford.

Ley was a chorister at St George's Chapel, Windsor Castle, a music scholar at Uppingham School, and in 1906 became an organ scholar at Keble College, Oxford. In 1908, he was president of the University Musical Club, and later he was an exhibitioner at the Royal College of Music, where he was a pupil of Sir Walter Parratt and Marmaduke Barton.

His younger brother, John William Ley, was killed in 1917 during the First World War, at the age of 19.

== Career ==
Ley served as organist at St Mary’s, Farnham Royal, from 1905 to 1906 and at Christ Church Cathedral, Oxford, from 1909 to 1926.

He became a professor of organ at the Royal College of Music in 1919 and was precentor of Radley College and Eton College, in charge of the chapel music, from 1926 to 1945. He was an Honorary Fellow of Keble College from 1926 to 1945.

He died at Feniton in Devon in on 24 August 1962.

== Works ==
Ley composed a number of choral works in the Anglican tradition, including anthems and chant settings. He also composed a setting of the Prayer of King Henry VI, also known as the Founder's Prayer. One of his hymn tunes 'Ottery St Mary' is set to a hymn 'Where is this stupendous stranger' by Christopher Smart 1722-1771.

Cultural offices
Preceded by Basil Harwood	Organist and Master of the Choristers of Christ Church Cathedral, Oxford; 1909–1926	Succeeded by Noel Ponsonby
