= Jeremy Hardie =

British economist and businessman (born 1938)

Jeremy Hardie CBE
- Born: Charles Jeremy Mawdesley Hardie; 9 June 1938 (age 88)
- Education: Nuffield College
- Occupations: Economist and businessman
- Spouse(s): Susan Chamberlain; Xandra Bingley; Kirsteen Tait
- Children: 5

Charles Jeremy Mawdesley Hardie (known as Jeremy Hardie) (born 9 June 1938), CBE is a British economist and businessman.

== Personal life ==
Hardie, the son of Sir Charles Hardie, was born in 1938 and went to school at Winchester College before studying at the University of Oxford, firstly reading Literae Humaniores (classics) at New College and then switching to economics for a post-graduate degree at Nuffield College.

Hardie married Susan Chamberlain while at Oxford, and had four children - Emma Hardie, Charlie Hardie, Beckie Hardie and Joshua Hardie.

His second marriage was to Xandra Bingley and they had one child, Charlotte Hardie.

His last marriage was to Kirsteen Tait.

== Career ==
=== Academic ===
He qualified as an accountant in 1965 but returned to Oxford thereafter, becoming a Fellow and Tutor in Economics at Keble College in 1968 after a year as a research fellow at Trinity College.

Hardie is currently a research associate in the Centre for Philosophy of Natural and Social Science at the London School of Economics. In 2012 he published Evidence Based Policy: A Practical Guide to Doing It Better with the philosopher Nancy Cartwright.

=== Financial ===
He left Keble in 1975, becoming a partner in the accountants Dixon Wilson & Co in the same year and remaining until 1982. He was a member of the Monopolies and Mergers Commission from 1976 to 1983, serving as Deputy Chairman from 1980 to 1983. He has chaired various companies, including the W H Smith Group from 1994 to 1999 and Loch Fyne Restaurants from 2002 to 2005; he was also chairman of the Centre for Economic Policy Research from 1984 to 1989. Companies of which he has been a director include John Swire & Sons Limited (1982 to 1998).

=== Awards and appointments ===
He was appointed a Commander of the Order of the British Empire (CBE) in 1983 for his work at the Monopolies and Mergers Commission. He was elected as an Honorary Fellow of Keble College in 1998.
