= North Newington =

Village in Oxfordshire, England

Coordinates: 52.055°N 1.390°W

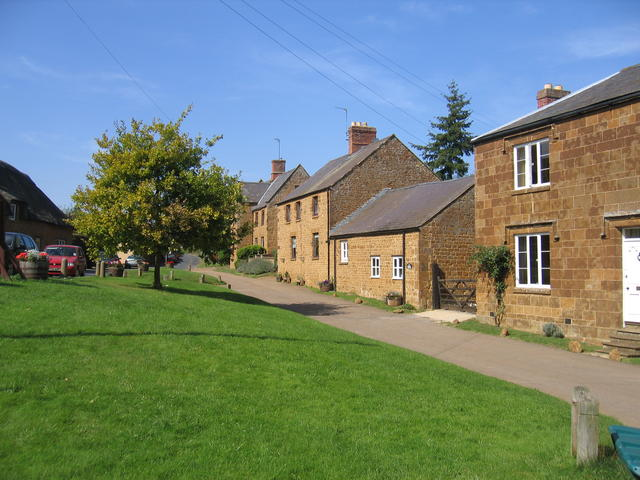

- Location within Oxfordshire
- Area: 4.47 km^{2} (1.73 sq mi)
- Population: 324 (2011 census)
  - Density: 72/km^{2} (190/sq mi)
- OS grid reference: SP4139
- Civil parish: North Newington
- District: Cherwell
- Shire county: Oxfordshire
- Region: South East
- Country: England
- Sovereign state: United Kingdom
- Post town: Banbury
- Postcode district: OX15
- Dialling code: 01295
- Police: Thames Valley
- Fire: Oxfordshire
- Ambulance: South Central
- UK Parliament: Banbury
- Website: North Newington's Website

North Newington is a village and civil parish in northern Oxfordshire, England, about 2 miles (3 km) west of Banbury. The 2011 census recorded the parish population as 324. The parish is nearly 2 miles (3 km) long east – west and about 1 mile (1.6 km) wide north – south. Sor Brook, a tributary of the River Cherwell, forms part of the eastern boundary of the parish and the B4035 road forms part of the southern boundary. The village is just west of Sor Brook, about 430 feet (130 m) above sea level.

== History ==
North Newington used to be a township in the parish of Broughton. It is still in the Church of England ecclesiastical parish of St Mary the Virgin, Broughton. The parish church is in the grounds of Broughton Castle, 1 mile (1.6 km) south of North Newington. North Newington's most notable historic building is Park Farm House, which has buttresses and other features from the 14th or 15th century. Park Farm has also a 17th-century circular dovecote.

== Amenities ==
A village school was built in 1853 and is now Bishop Carpenter Church of England primary school. The school celebrated its sesquicentenary in 2003 with an open day at which it invited former pupils to return and share memories. This was combined with a Village History Day which showed how the village has developed since records began. North Newington has a 17th-century public house, The Baker's Arms, which currently trades as the Blinking Owl. The village used to have another 17th-century pub, the Roebuck, which is now a private house.

== See also ==
- South Newington

== Sources and further reading ==
- Lobel, Mary D; Crossley, Alan, eds. (1969). "Broughton". A History of the County of Oxford. Victoria County History. Vol. 9: Bloxham Hundred. London: Oxford University Press for the Institute of Historical Research. pp. 85–102. ISBN 978-0-19722-726-8.
- Sherwood, Jennifer; Pevsner, Nikolaus (1974). Oxfordshire. The Buildings of England. Harmondsworth: Penguin Books. p. 498. ISBN 0-14-071045-0.
