= Kenneth Woollcombe =

English Anglican bishop (1924–2008)

The Right Reverend Kenneth Woollcombe
- Bishop of Oxford
- Church: Church of England
- Diocese: Diocese of Oxford
- In office: 1971 to 1978
- Predecessor: Harry Carpenter
- Successor: Patrick Rodger
- Other posts: Assistant Bishop of Worcester (1989–2008); Canon Precentor at St Paul's Cathedral (1981–1989)

Orders
- Ordination: 1951 (deacon); 1952 (priest) by Maurice Harland
- Consecration: 16 March 1971 by Michael Ramsey

Personal details
- Born: 2 January 1924 Sutton, London, England
- Died: 3 March 2008 (aged 84)
- Denomination: Anglicanism
- Education: St John's College, Oxford; Westcott House, Cambridge

Kenneth John Woollcombe (2 January 1924 – 3 March 2008) was an Anglican academic who was Bishop of Oxford in the middle part of his career, from 1971 to 1978.

== Early years ==
Woollcombe was born in Sutton, where his father, the Reverend Edward Woollcombe, was rector. He was educated at Sandroyd School before heading to Haileybury, and served in the RNVR in the Second World War, being commissioned in the engineering branch in 1945 and confirmed in the rank of sub-lieutenant in 1946. He served on several minesweepers. He read theology at St John's College, Oxford, from 1948. He won an exhibition, a scholarship, and the Ellerton Prize, but only achieved a 2:1. He married Gwendolyn Hodges in 1950. They had three daughters. He studied for ordination at Westcott House in Cambridge; was made a deacon on Trinity Sunday 1951 (20 May) and priested the next Trinity Sunday (8 June 1952) — both times by Maurice Harland, Bishop of Lincoln, at Lincoln Cathedral; and spent two years as a curate at St James, Grimsby, before returning to St John's College in 1955, combining the roles of Fellow, Chaplain and Lecturer. He contributed to a book, The Historic Episcopate, in 1954 and published Essays on Typology with Geoffrey Lampe, his predecessor as chaplain, in 1957.

== Scholar and bishop ==
Woollcombe was Professor of Dogmatic Theology at the General Theological Seminary in New York from 1960 to 1963, and then became principal of Edinburgh Theological College, the theological college of the Scottish Episcopal Church in Edinburgh, and a canon of Edinburgh Cathedral. He became Bishop of Oxford in 1971, succeeding Harry Carpenter; Woollcombe was consecrated a bishop by Michael Ramsey, Archbishop of Canterbury, on 16 March 1971 at Westminster Abbey. He supported rapprochement with the Methodist Church, and became well known as a committed advocate of the ordination of women as full priests within the Church. He was chairman of the Society for Promoting Christian Knowledge (SPCK) from 1973 to 1979, and a delegate to the World Council of Churches (WCC) in Nairobi, later joining the central committee of the WCC. He was mentioned as a possible Archbishop of Canterbury. However, he found his position a strain, and suffered from poor health. His first wife died of cancer in 1976, and he resigned as Bishop of Oxford in 1978. He moved to London to become an Assistant Bishop (1978–1981) to the Bishop of London, Gerald Ellison; he was given responsibility for the City of Westminster. He remarried in 1980, to Juliet Dearmer (granddaughter of Canon Percy Dearmer) who had become a deaconess in 1977. They had one daughter.

He declined the positions of Provost of Coventry Cathedral and Bishop of Worcester, deciding to serve as canon precentor at St Paul's Cathedral instead, an office that he was installed into on 1 November 1981 and held until he retired in 1989. He was committed to ecumenism, serving as a member of the Churches Council for Covenanting for Unity, and as chairman of the English Anglican-Roman Catholic Conversations. He sat as one of the five judges of the Court of Ecclesiastical Causes Reserved which granted a retrospective faculty for Henry Moore's controversial new altar commissioned by Chad Varah and Peter Palumbo, Baron Palumbo for St Stephen Walbrook.

== Final years and death ==
He retired to Worcestershire in 1989 where he served as an Assistant Bishop of Worcester. In 1991 he took over four parishes with his wife, who was ordained as a priest in 1994. He retired again, to Pershore, in 1998; he died in Worcester. He is survived by his second wife and their daughter and his three daughters from his first marriage. His memorial service – attended by (among others) Alan Wilson, Bishop of Buckingham; and Michael Scholar, President of St John's College, Oxford — took place at Christ Church Cathedral, Oxford on 28 May 2008.

Church of England titles
Preceded by Harry Carpenter	Bishop of Oxford; 1971–1978	Succeeded by Patrick Rodger
