= Richard Temple West =

English priest and academic (1827–1893)

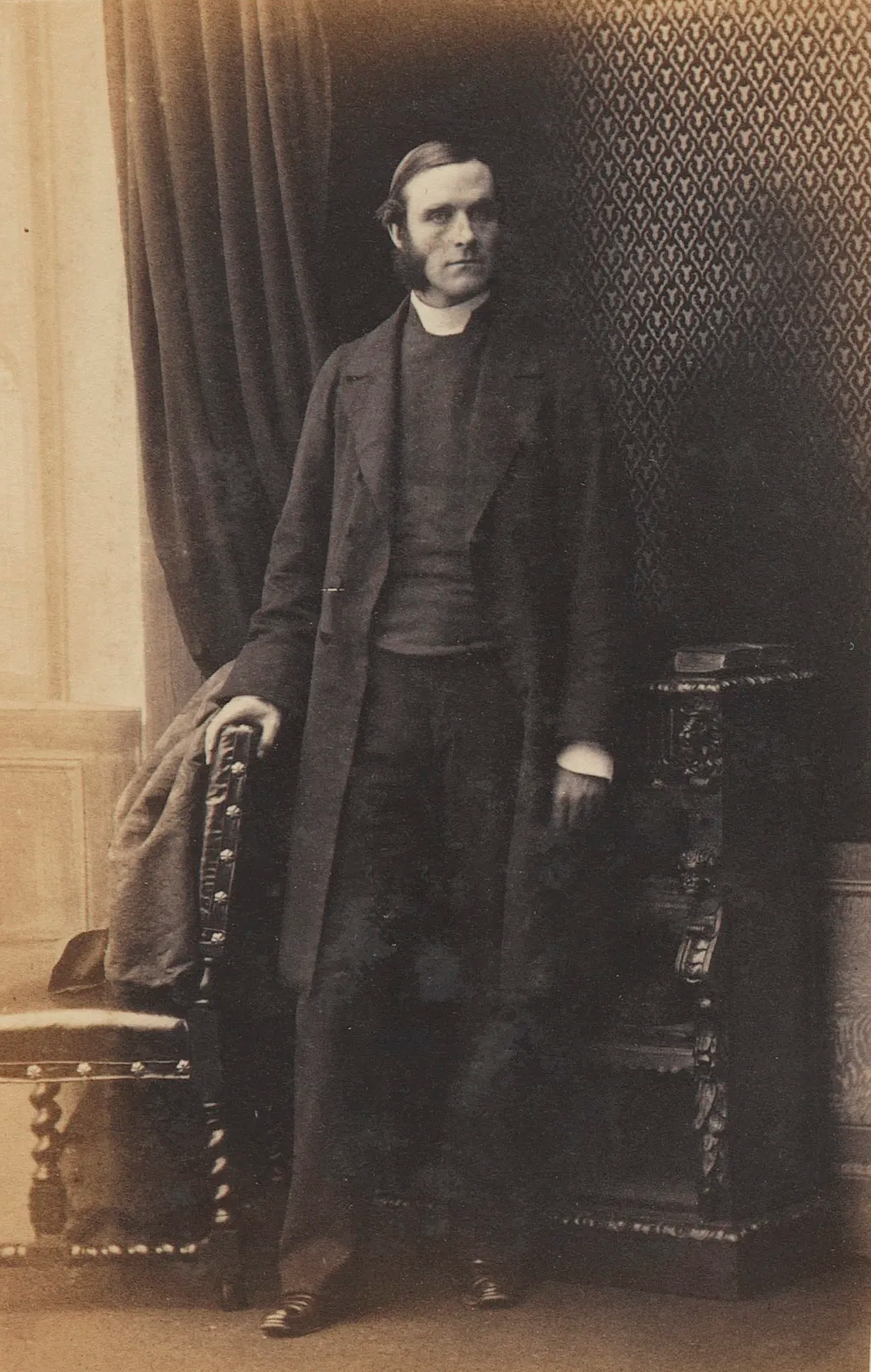
Portrait by Camille Silvy, 1860

Richard Temple West (29 April 1827 – 10 February 1893) was a prominent High Church English clergyman and academic in the 19th century.

== Life ==
Richard Temple West was born in Leeds, Yorkshire on 29 April 1827. His father was a Commissioner in Bankruptcy, and his mother (Lady Maria Walpole) was a daughter of Horatio Walpole, 2nd Earl of Orford. His brother, Sir Algernon West, was Principal Private Secretary to Prime minister William Ewart Gladstone.

Richard West was educated at Christ Church, Oxford, and was appointed as a Student of Christ Church (the equivalent of a Fellow at other colleges) in 1848, a position that he held until 1875. He was ordained as a priest in the Church of England, and served as curate of a number of churches, including the London church of All Saints, Margaret Street. He was appointed as vicar of St Mary Magdalene, Paddington in 1865, where he remained until his death. He was a High Church Anglican, and was described by The Times as "one of the most prominent and respected of the High Church clergy of the metropolis". He was a member of the governing council of Keble College, Oxford, from 1882 to 1893. He died in Bournemouth on 10 September 1893.
