= Charles Macpherson =

Scottish organist

Charles Macpherson DMus (Dunelm) FRAM FRCO (10 May 1870 – 28 May 1927) was a Scottish organist, who served at St Paul's Cathedral.

== Family ==
Macpherson was born in Edinburgh on 10 May 1870, to Charles Macpherson, the Burgh Architect, and Mary Charlotte d'Egville. His brother, the Rev. Ranald Macpherson (1871–1951) was sometime Vicar Choral of Ripon Cathedral.

He married Sophia Menella Newbolt (1883–1962), the youngest daughter of the Rev. Canon William Charles Edmund Newbolt, in 1910. Their son, Alasdair Charles Macpherson (born 1911), died in 1941 while serving with the Royal Air Force Volunteer Reserve.

== Career ==
At the age of nine, Macpherson became a chorister at St. Paul's Cathedral, later studying music at the Royal Academy of Music. He was organist at St Clement Eastcheap between 1887 and 1890, before returning to St Paul's as assistant organist between 1895 and 1916, being made organist in 1916, a position he held until his death.

He was Professor of Composition at the Royal Academy of Music and was elected a Fellow. He was President of the Royal College of Organists from 1920 to 1922. Two hymns by Macpherson were included in Hymns Ancient and Modern in 1916 Exsurgat Deus, and Stonypath. He composed a Thanksgiving Te Deum for the thanksgiving service at St Paul's on 6 July 1919, which marked the end of the First World War and was attended by King George V and Queen Mary.

He died suddenly on 28 May 1927.

Cultural offices
Preceded by George Clement Martin	Organist and Master of the Choristers of St Paul's Cathedral; 1916-1927	Succeeded by Stanley Marchant
