= Stanley Marchant =

English musician (1883–1949)

Stanley Marchant by Francis Dodd, 1946

Sir Stanley Robert Marchant CVO (15 May 1883 – 28 February 1949) was an English church musician, teacher and composer. After more than 30 years as a church and cathedral organist he was appointed principal of the Royal Academy of Music (RAM), and was professor of music at the University of London.

== Life and career ==
Marchant was born in London. He had a good singing voice as a child and as a choirboy he decided to devote his life to music. He won a scholarship to the Royal Academy of Music (RAM), where he won prizes for composition and organ playing.

From 1899 to 1936 Marchant was a church and cathedral organist, working successively at Kemsing Parish Church, Kent; Christ Church, Newgate Street, London (from 1903), and St Peter's, Eaton Square ( from 1913). In 1903 he was appointed sub-organist at St Paul's Cathedral, and in 1927 he was made organist in succession to Charles Macpherson. At that time the building was partially closed for restoration. Grove's Dictionary of Music and Musicians records that Marchant conducted the reopening ceremony in June 1930 and the thanksgiving service for the silver jubilee of King George V in 1935, composing for each occasion a Te Deum. During his career as an organist he was made a Fellow of the Royal College of Organists in 1902, and took a Doctorate of Music at Oxford in 1914.

In 1914 Marchant was appointed a professor at the RAM. He became warden there in 1934 and principal in 1936, at which point he resigned his post at St Paul's. In addition to his RAM duties he was appointed professor of music at London University in 1937). The Times said of his tenure at the RAM that he "breathed a new atmosphere into the conduct of affairs ... so that technical proficiency and a liberal outlook were happily combined". Marchant was appointed CVO in 1935 and knighted in 1943. In 1946 he was elected an honorary fellow of Pembroke College, Oxford. From 1947 he was chairman of the council of the Royal School of Church Music. He also chaired consultative panels for the Arts Council and the BBC.

As a composer, Marchant produced mainly church music, including anthems, canticles and other liturgical music, but he also composed secular works for chorus, organ and solo voice. Grove says of Marchant's music: "the finest ... inspired by ceremonial occasions at St Paul's, is well crafted, though conservative in idiom, and shows the influence of Stanford and Parry." The choir library at St Paul's holds his complete choral works.

Marchant married Hilda Constance Holyman; they had a son and a daughter. Marchant died in London, while still in post as principal of the RAM, at the age of 65.

Cultural offices
Preceded by Charles Macpherson	Organist and Master of the Choristers of St Paul's Cathedral; 1927-1936	Succeeded by John Dykes Bower
