= George Martin (organist) =

English organist

Sir George Martin MVO
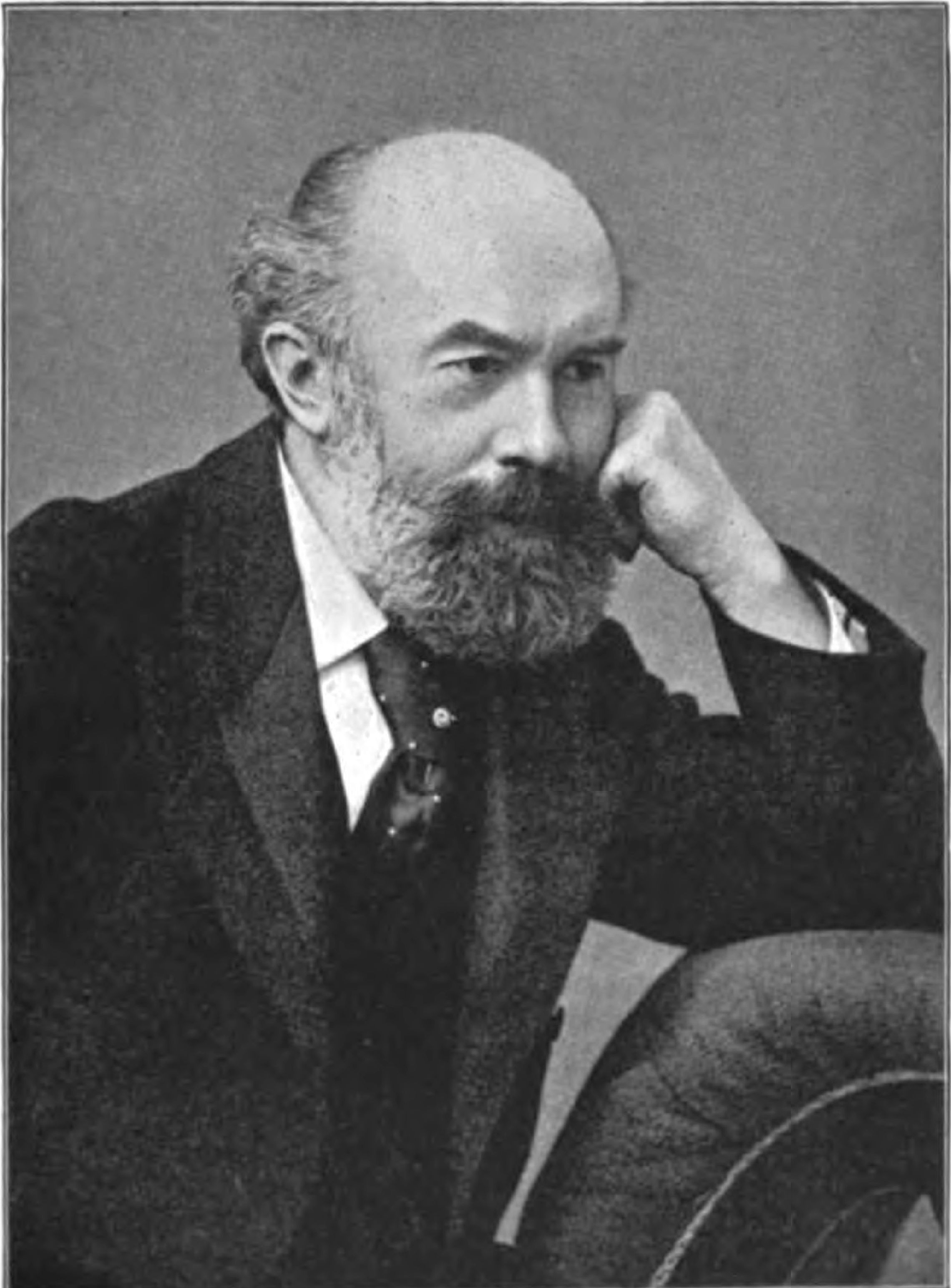
- Martin, 1897

Background information
- Born: George Clement Martin; 11 September 1844; Lambourn, Berkshire, England
- Died: 21 February 1916 (aged 71) London, England
- Genres: Classical
- Occupation: Organist
- Instrument: Pipe organ

Sir George Clement Martin MVO (11 September 1844 – 21 February 1916) was an English organist, who served at St Paul's Cathedral.

== Background ==
Martin was born in Lambourn, Berkshire on 11 September 1844. John Footman's 1894 history of Lambourn Church describes him as "the only native of Lambourn who has ever risen to fame".

His interest in music began after he heard Sir Herbert Oakeley play Bach in Lambourn. He studied organ under John Stainer, supposedly cycling from Lambourn to Oxford daily for his studies. In June 1868 he matriculated at New College, Oxford, and a few days later was awarded a B.Mus. degree.

Martin died 21 February 1916, in London. He has a memorial plaque in Lambourn church near the organ.

== Career ==
Sub-organist at St Paul's Cathedral 1876–1888

Organist of:

- Lambourn Parish Church
- Dalkeith for the Duke of Buccleuch in 1871 and St. Peter's, Edinburgh, briefly at the same time
- St Paul's Cathedral 1888–1916

== Works ==
Martin is perhaps best known for his hymn tune "St. Helen" (commonly used for the hymn "Lord, enthroned in heavenly splendour"). He was a composer, mostly of church music, which included a Te Deum in A, performed at the Thanksgiving Service held on the steps of the Cathedral in Queen Victoria's Diamond Jubilee year.

Martin transcribed Sir Edward Elgar's 1897 work "Imperial March" for organ, in which form it is still frequently played by many concert organists, often as an encore. It is, in this form, possibly better known than in the original orchestral arrangement, which (outside England) is only occasionally performed - organist Simon Preston's 1964 recording on the organ of Westminster Abbey is one well-known version.

He also wrote a primer on "The Art of Training Choir Boys" which became a standard work on the subject.

== Awards and honours ==
Martin was given a knighthood in the 1897 Diamond Jubilee Honours. He was appointed a Member (4th class) of the Royal Victorian Order in the November 1902 Birthday Honours list. He was invested with the insignia by King Edward VII at Buckingham Palace on 18 December 1902.

Cultural offices
Preceded by John Stainer	Organist and Master of the Choristers of St Paul's Cathedral; 1888 - 1916	Succeeded by Charles Macpherson
