= Beresford Kidd =

Anglican priest and historian

Beresford James Kidd
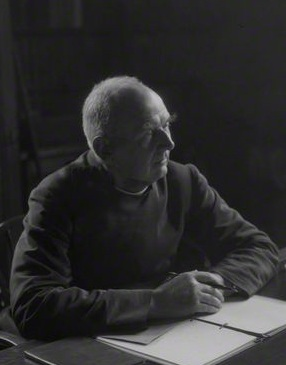
- Born: 1 January 1864; Birmingham
- Died: 15 May 1948 (aged 84)
- Education: Keble College, Oxford
- Spouse: Agnes Walker
- Awards: Order of St. Sava (5th Class)
- Scientific career
- Fields: Church history
- Workplaces: Pembroke College, Oxford; Keble College, Oxford
- Academic advisors: William Bright

Beresford James Kidd (1 January 1864 – 15 May 1948) was an Anglican priest and Church historian, who was Warden of Keble College, Oxford, from 1920 to 1939. He is best known for his History of the Church to A.D. 461, 3 vols., which with its very full references aimed at "putting students into direct contact with the sources and enabling them to use the originals for themselves" (vol. i, p. v).

== Life ==
B. J. Kidd was born in Birmingham on 1 January 1864, the son of the Revd James and Mary Kidd. He was educated at Christ's Hospital before going up to Keble College, Oxford, matriculating on 17 October 1882. At Keble he received honours: second class in Mods (Honour Moderations) in 1883, second class in Literae Humaniores in 1886, and first class in theology in 1887. He received his B.A. in 1886 and his M.A. in 1889. He was awarded a BD in 1898 and a DD in 1904.

Following graduation B. J. Kidd worked both as a clergyman in the Church of England and as an academic at the University of Oxford. He was ordained deacon in 1887, priest in 1888, and served as Assistant Curate at the Church of St Philip and St James Church, Oxford, from 1887 to 1900. He served as chaplain of Pembroke College, Oxford, from 1894 to 1896, was a lecturer in theology of the college from 1902 to 1911, and was also Tutor of the Non-Collegiate Students at Oxford (an institution that later became St Catherine's College, Oxford) from 1889 to 1920. He served as examiner in the honours school of theology, 1902–04 and 1917–19; examining chaplain to the Bishop of Oxford, 1912; and to the Bishop of London, 1927. From 1904 to 1920 he was vicar of St Paul's, a Church of England parish church on Walton Street, Oxford. He was Proctor in Convocation, 1917, and Prolocutor of the Convocation of Canterbury, 1932–36. In 1920, he was appointed Warden of Keble College, Oxford, a position he held until 1939. As for honours, in 1919 he received the Order of St. Sava (5th class), a Serbian decoration instituted to recognise civilians for meritorious achievements in the arts and sciences. He was appointed an Honorary Canon of Christ Church, Oxford, in 1915, and an Honorary Fellow of Keble College in 1940. He died on 15 May 1948. He was married (1894) to Agnes Walker, daughter of W. T. Walker; they had no children.

== Works ==
- The Later Mediaeval Doctrine of the Eucharistic Sacrifice. Church Historical Society [Publications] 46. London: Society for Promoting Christian Knowledge, 1898.
- The Thirty-nine Articles: Their History and Explanation, 2 volumes. Oxford Church Text Books. London: Rivingtons, 1899.
  - Vol. 1: Articles I-VIII; Vol. 2: Articles IX-XXXIX.
- The Continental Reformation. 2nd ed. Oxford Church Text Books. New York: Edwin S. Gorham, 1908.
- Documents Illustrative of the Continental Reformation. Oxford: Clarendon Press, 1911.
- Documents Illustrative of the History of the Church, 3 vols. Translations of Christian Literature, Series VI. London: Society for Promoting Christian Knowledge, 1920.
  - Vol. I. To A. D. 313; Vol. II. 313—461 A. D.; Vol. III. c. 500—1500.
- A History of the Church to A.D. 461, 3 vols. Oxford: Clarendon Press, 1922.
  - Vol. I. To A. D. 313; Vol. II. 313—408 A. D.; Vol. III. 408—461 A. D..
- The Churches of Eastern Christendom from A.D. 451 to the Present Time. London: The Faith Press, 1927.
  - Kidd, Beresford J. (2010) [1927]. The Churches of Eastern Christendom: From A.D. 451 to the Present Time. Routledge: New York. ISBN 9781136212789.
- The Counter-Reformation, 1550–1600. London: Society for Promoting Christian Knowledge, 1933.
- The Roman Primacy to A. D. 461. London: Society for Promoting Christian Knowledge, 1936.

Academic offices
Preceded by Walter Lock	Warden of Keble College, Oxford; 1920—1939	Succeeded by Harry James Carpenter
