= Harry Carpenter (bishop) =

English bishop and theologian

Harry Carpenter

Harry James Carpenter (20 October 1901 in Liss – 24 May 1993 in Oxford) was an English bishop and theologian. He was warden of Keble College, Oxford (1939–1956) and then 37th Bishop of Oxford (1955–1970).

Carpenter was educated at Churcher's College and Queens' College, Cambridge; and ordained after studying at Cuddesdon College in 1928. His first post was a curacy in Leatherhead.

Carpenter married Urith Monica Trevelyan, a teacher. Their son was the biographer, writer and radio broadcaster, Humphrey Carpenter.

From 1962 to 1970, Carpenter he lived in the village of Cuddesdon, where there had historically been a bishop's palace, but his successors found this impractical and in 1978 the bishops reverted to living within the city. He initiated the ecumenical discussions which eventually resulted in the building of the Church of Christ the Cornerstone in Milton Keynes.

There is a parish school named after Carpenter in the Oxfordshire village of North Newington.

Academic offices
Preceded by Beresford Kidd	Warden of Keble College, Oxford; 1939–1955	Succeeded by Eric Symes Abbott
Church of England titles
Preceded by Kenneth E. Kirk	Bishop of Oxford; 1955–1970	Succeeded by Kenneth John Woollcombe
