= Christopher Rowland (theologian) =

English Anglican priest (born 1947)

The Reverend Christopher Rowland
- Born: Christopher Charles Rowland; 21 May 1947 (age 79); Doncaster, England
- Spouse: Catherine Rogers (m. 1969)

Ecclesiastical career
- Religion: Christianity (Anglican)
- Church: Church of England
- Ordained: 1975 (deacon); 1976 (priest)

Academic background
- Education: Christ's College, Cambridge; Ridley Hall, Cambridge
- Thesis: The Influence of the First Chapter of Ezekiel on Jewish and Early Christian Literature (1974)

Academic work
- Discipline: Theology
- Sub-discipline: Biblical theology
- Institutions: Newcastle University; Jesus College, Cambridge; The Queen's College, Oxford
- Notable works: Radical Christianity (1988)
- Influenced: Michael J. Gorman; Robin Griffith-Jones

Christopher Charles Rowland (born 21 May 1947) is an English Anglican priest and theologian. He was Dean Ireland's Professor of the Exegesis of Holy Scripture at the University of Oxford from 1991 to 2014.

== Life ==
Rowland was born on 21 May 1947 in Doncaster, then in the West Riding of Yorkshire, and was educated at Doncaster Grammar School. He then studied at Christ's College, Cambridge, and for ordination in the Church of England at Ridley Hall, Cambridge.

He was ordained deacon in 1975 and priest in 1976, serving as curate at two parishes in the Newcastle upon Tyne area (Benwell 1975–1978, Gosforth 1978–1979). Between 1974 and 1979, he lectured in religious studies at Newcastle University, returning to Cambridge as a Fellow of Jesus College, Cambridge, in 1979. He was an assistant lecturer in divinity at the university from 1983 to 1985, then lecturer from 1985 to 1991.

In 1991, he was appointed Dean Ireland's Professor of the Exegesis of Holy Scripture at the University of Oxford, a post that carries with it a fellowship at The Queen's College, Oxford. He retired from Oxford in 2014 and was appointed professor emeritus. He was appointed Canon Theologian of Liverpool Cathedral in 2005.

He influenced the scholars Michael J. Gorman and Robin Griffith-Jones

== Works ==
=== Books ===
- Rowland, Christopher C. (1982). The Open Heaven: a study of apocalyptic in Judaism and early Christianity. New York: Crossroad. ISBN 978-0-824-50455-7. OCLC 8410967.
- ——— (1985). Christian Origins: an account of the setting and character of the most important messianic sect of Judaism. London: SPCK. ISBN 978-0-281-04110-7. OCLC 13004836.
- ——— (1985). Christian Origins: from Messianic movement to Christian religion. Minneapolis, MN: Augsburg Publishing. ISBN 978-0-806-62173-9. OCLC 12131161. - differently titled US edition
- ——— (1988). Radical Christianity: a reading of recovery. Maryknoll, NY: Orbis Books. ISBN 978-0-883-44370-5. OCLC 17806833.
- ———; Rogerson, J. W.; Lindars, Barnabas (1988). The Study and Use of the Bible. History of Christian Theology. Vol. 2. Basingstoke, Hants, UK; Grand Rapids, MI: Marshall Pickering; Eerdmans. ISBN 978-0-802-80196-8. OCLC 17549749.
- ———; Corner, Mark (1989). Liberating Exegesis: the challenge of liberation theology to Biblical studies. Louisville, KY: Westminster, John Knox Press. ISBN 978-0-664-25084-3. OCLC 20800546.
- ——— (1993). Revelation. Epworth Commentaries. London: Epworth Press. ISBN 978-0-716-20493-0. OCLC 32857756.
- ———; Ashton, John; Fletcher-Louis, Crispin H. T., eds. (1998). Understanding, studying, and reading: New Testament essays in honour of John Ashton. Journal for the Study of the New Testament, Supplement Series. Vol. 153. Sheffield, England: Sheffield Academic Press. ISBN 978-1-850-75828-0. OCLC 44685561.
- ———; Edwards, M. J.; Goodman, Martin; Price, S. R. F., eds. (1999). Apologetics in the Roman Empire: pagans, Jews, and Christians. Oxford; New York: Oxford University Press. ISBN 978-0-198-26986-1. OCLC 40158874.
- ———, ed. (1999). The Cambridge Companion to Liberation Theology. Cambridge Companions to Religion. Cambridge; New York: Cambridge University Press. ISBN 978-0-521-46144-3. OCLC 39122856.
- ———; Bradstock, Andrew, eds. (2002). Radical Christian Writings: a reader. Oxford; Malden, MA: Blackwell Publishers. ISBN 978-0-631-22249-1. OCLC 48100595.
- ———; Barton, John, eds. (2002). Apocalyptic in History and Tradition. Journal for the Study of the Pseudepigrapha, Supplement Series. Vol. 43. London: Sheffield Academic Press. ISBN 978-0-826-46208-4. OCLC 51568109.
- ———; Kovacs, Judith L. (2004). Revelation: the Apocalypse of Jesus Christ. Blackwell Bible Commentaries. Malden, MA: Blackwell Publishing. ISBN 978-0-631-23214-8. OCLC 52922297.
- ———; Tuckett, Christopher M., eds. (2006). The Nature of New Testament Theology: essays in honour of Robert Morgan. Malden, MA; Oxford: Blackwell Publishing. ISBN 978-1-405-11175-1. OCLC 60741978.
- ——— (2007). "Wheels within wheels": William Blake and the Ezekiel's merkabah in text and image. Père Marquette lecture in theology, 2007. Milwaukee, WI: Marquette University Press. ISBN 978-0-874-62587-5. OCLC 81860428.
- ———; Morray-Jones, Christopher R. A. (2009). The Mystery of God: early Jewish mysticism and the New Testament. Compendia rerum Iudaicarum ad Novum Testamentum, Section 3: Jewish traditions in early Christian literature. Vol. 12. Leiden; Boston: Brill. ISBN 978-9-004-17532-7. OCLC 316736889.
- ——— (2010). Blake and the Bible. London; New Haven, CT: Yale University Press. ISBN 978-0-300-11260-3. OCLC 449853455.

=== Articles ===
- ——— (1980). "The Vision of the Risen Christ in Rev i.13 ff.: The Debt of an Early Christology to an Aspect of Jewish Angelology". Journal of Theological Studies. 31: 1–11.

== Festschriften ==
- Bennett, Zoë; Gowler, David B., eds. (2012). Radical Christian Voices and Practice: Essays in Honour of Christopher Rowland. Oxford: Oxford University Press. ISBN 978-0-19-959977-6.
- Knight, Jonathan; Sullivan, Kevin P., eds. (2015). The Open Mind: essays in honour of Christopher Rowland. Library of New Testament Studies. Vol. 522. London: T & T Clark. ISBN 978-0-567-65851-7. OCLC 890393310.
- Ashton, John, ed. (2014). Revealed Wisdom: studies in Apocalyptic in honour of Christopher Rowland. Ancient Judaism and Early Christianity. Vol. 88. Boston, MA: Brill. ISBN 978-9-004-27203-3. OCLC 872222399.

Academic offices
Preceded by E. P. Sanders	Dean Ireland's Professor of the Exegesis of Holy Scripture; 1991–2014	Succeeded by Markus Bockmuehl
Awards
Preceded by Takamitsu Muraoka	Burkitt Medal; 2018	Succeeded by John J. Collins
