= Ten Commandments in Catholic theology =

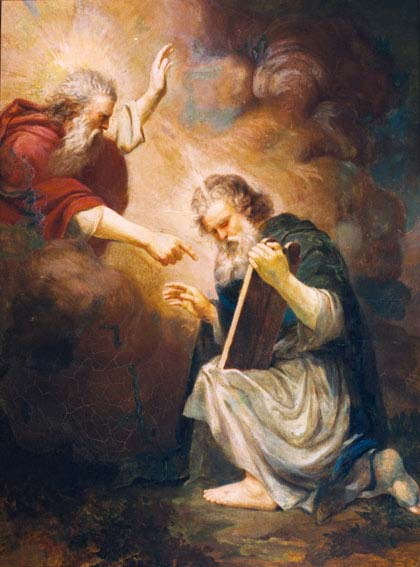
Moses Receives the Tablets of the Law (painting by João Zeferino da Costa, 1868)

The Ten Commandments are a series of religious and moral imperatives that are recognized as a moral foundation in several of the Abrahamic religions, including the Catholic Church. As described in the Old Testament books Exodus and Deuteronomy, the Commandments form part of a covenant offered by God to the Israelites to free them from the spiritual slavery of sin. According to the Catechism of the Catholic Church—the official exposition of the Catholic Church's Christian beliefs—the Commandments are considered essential for spiritual good health and growth, and serve as the basis for Catholic social teaching. A review of the Commandments is one of the most common types of examination of conscience used by Catholics before receiving the sacrament of Penance.

The Commandments appear in the earliest Church writings; the Catechism states that they have "occupied a predominant place" in teaching the faith since the time of Augustine of Hippo (AD 354–430). The Church had no official standards for religious instruction until the Fourth Lateran Council in 1215; evidence suggests the Commandments were used in Christian education in the early Church and throughout the Middle Ages. The perceived lack of instruction in them by some dioceses was the basis of one of the criticisms launched against the Church by Protestant reformers. Afterward, the first Church-wide catechism in 1566 provided "thorough discussions of each commandment", but gave greater emphasis to the seven sacraments. The most recent Catechism devotes a large section to interpret each of the commandments.

Church teaching of the Commandments is largely based on the Old and New Testaments and the writings of the early Church Fathers. In the New Testament, Jesus acknowledged their validity and instructed his disciples to go further, demanding a righteousness exceeding that of the scribes and Pharisees. Summarized by Jesus into two "Great Commandments" that teach love of God and love of neighbor, they instruct individuals on their relationships with both. The first three commandments require reverence and respect for God's name, observation of the Lord's Day and prohibit the worship of other gods. The others deal with the relationships between individuals, such as that between parent and child; they include prohibitions against lying, stealing, murdering, adultery and covetousness.

== Numbering ==
The Old Testament refers to ten individual commandments, even though there are more than ten imperative sentences in the two relevant texts: Exodus 20:1–17 and Deuteronomy 5:6–21. The Old Testament does not make clear how the texts should be divided to arrive at ten commandments. The division traditionally used by the Catholic and Lutheran churches was first derived by the Latin Church Father Augustine of Hippo (354–430) who modified the original order in his book Questions on Exodus. Other Christian communities, such as the Eastern Orthodox Church and many Protestant churches, use the formulation standardized by the Greek Fathers of the Christian East. The two forms have slightly different numbering, but maintain exactly the same substance despite some Protestant claims to the contrary. Rabbinic Jewish numbering is more closely aligned with the Eastern Church tradition, considering the text against covetousness as a single proscription, but differs from Christian denominations in that it considers what many Christians call a prologue to be the entire first commandment.

== History ==
The Ten Commandments are recognized as a moral foundation by Judaism, Christianity, and Islam. They first appear in the Book of Exodus, according to which Moses, acting under the orders of God, freed the Israelites from physical slavery in Egypt. According to Church teaching, God offered a covenant—which included the Ten Commandments—to also free them from the "spiritual slavery" of sin. Some historians have described this as "the central event in the history of ancient Israel".

The coming of Jesus is seen by the Catholic Church as the fulfillment of the Old Testament and Jews, who were chosen, according to Peter Kreeft, to "show the true God to the world". Jesus acknowledged the Commandments and instructed his followers to go further, requiring, in Kreeft's words, "more, not less: a 'righteousness (which) exceeds that of the scribes and Pharisees'". Explaining Church teaching, Kreeft states, "The Commandments are to the moral order what the creation story in Genesis 1 is to the natural order. They are God's order conquering chaos. They are not man's ideas about God, but God's ideas about man." The Church teaches that Jesus freed people from keeping "the burdensome Jewish law (Torah or Mosaic Law) with its 613 distinct regulations [but] not from the obligation to keep the Ten Commandments", because the Ten "were written 'with the finger of God', (Note: According to A Catholic Dictionary, the Commandments were written by God directly on tablets of stone that were placed in the Ark of the Covenant and formed the "center and kernel of the Jewish religion. They were given more directly by God than any other part of the Jewish law, and they were placed in the most holy place, which none but the high priest could enter, and he only once a year.") unlike [those] written by Moses". This teaching was reaffirmed at the Council of Trent (1545–1563) and at the Second Vatican Council (1962–1965).

Although it is uncertain what role the Ten Commandments played in early Christian worship, evidence suggests they were recited during some services and used in Christian education. For example, the Commandments are included in one of the earliest Christian writings, known as the Teaching of the Twelve Apostles or the Didache. Scholars contend that the Commandments were highly regarded by the early Church as a summary of God's law. The Protestant scholar Klaus Bockmuehl believes that the Church replaced the Commandments with lists of virtues and vices, such as the seven deadly sins, from 400 to 1200. Other scholars contend that throughout Church history the Commandments have been used as an examination of conscience and that many theologians have written about them. While evidence exists that the Commandments were part of catechesis in monasteries and other venues, there was no official Church position to promote specific methods of religious instruction during the Middle Ages. The Fourth Lateran Council (1215) was the first attempt to remedy this problem. Surviving evidence reveals that some bishops' efforts to implement the council's resolutions included special emphasis on teaching the Commandments in their respective dioceses. Centuries later, the lack of instruction in them by some dioceses formed the basis of one of the criticisms launched against the Church by Protestant reformers.

Catechisms produced in specific dioceses from the mid-fourteenth century emphasized the Commandments and laid the foundation for the first official Church-wide catechism, the 1566 Roman Catechism. Commissioned by the Council of Trent, it provided "thorough discussions of each commandment" but gave greater emphasis to the seven sacraments to emphasize the Catholic belief that Christian life was dependent upon the grace solely obtained through the sacramental life provided by the Catholic Church. This emphasis conflicted with Protestant beliefs, which held the Commandments as the source of divine grace. While more recent papal encyclicals offer interpretations of Church teaching on individual commandments, throughout history official Church teachings on the Commandments are based on their mentions in the Old and New Testaments and the writings of the early Church Fathers Origen, Irenaeus and Augustine. Later, theologians Thomas Aquinas and Bonaventure offered notable commentaries on the Commandments. Aquinas, a Doctor of the Church, considered them to be the "primary precepts of justice and all law, and natural reason gives immediate assent to them as being plainly evident principles.". Aquinas also underlined the disposition into two synoptic tables, where: "Three of these Commandments that were written on the first tablet referred to the love of God; and the seven Commandments written on the other tablet related to the love of our neighbor". In the same way, the Lord gave the twofold Great Commandment, for God and for the neighbour, by virtue of the four reasons of charity.

The most recent Catechism of the Catholic Church, the official summary of Church beliefs, devotes a large section to the Commandments, which serve as the basis for Catholic social teaching. According to the Catechism, the Church has given them a predominant place in teaching the faith since the fifth century. Kreeft explains that the Church regards them as "a path of life", and a "path to freedom" just as a schoolyard fence protects children from "life-threatening dangers". Australian writer Michael Tate suggests that the phrase "ten commandments" could be better replaced with "ten responses" which ought to "characterise a liberated people freed from slavery by 'the Lord, your God'".

== First commandment ==
"I am the LORD your God, who brought you out of the land of Egypt, out of the house of bondage. You shall have no other gods before me."
The first commandment according to the Catechism of the Catholic Church

The first commandment, according to Church teaching, "means that [followers] must worship and adore God alone because God is alone." The Catechism explains that this prohibits idolatry, providing examples of forbidden practices such as the worship of any creature, and of "'demons ... power, pleasure, race, ancestors, the state [and] money'". Augustine interpreted this commandment as "Love God and then do what you will". Explaining this sentiment, Kreeft states that all sin "serves some other god, obeys another commander: the world or the flesh or the devil", if God truly be loved then one will do what God wills.

The Catechism associates this commandment with the three theological virtues. The first virtue, faith, instructs Catholics to believe in God and avoid heresy, apostasy, and schism. The second virtue, hope, cautions Catholics against despair and presumption. According to the Catechism, the last virtue, charity, can be met only if Catholics refrain from indifference or ingratitude toward God, and avoid spiritual laziness and a hatred of God stemming from pride. The Catechism enumerates specific violations of this commandment, including superstition, polytheism, sacrilege, atheism, and all practices of magic and sorcery. It further prohibits astrology, palm reading, and consulting horoscopes or mediums. The Catechism attributes the latter actions to a "desire for power over time, history, and in the last analysis, other human beings as well as a wish to conciliate hidden powers".

=== Graven images ===
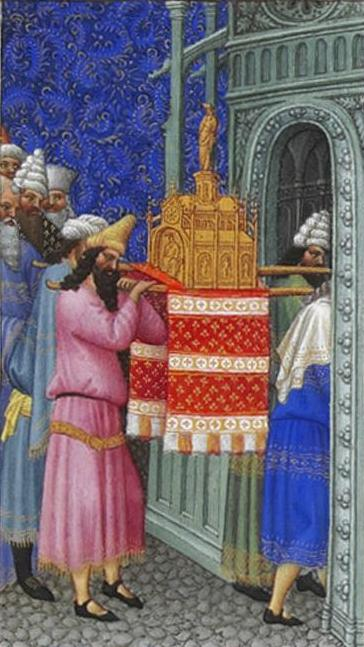
The Ark of the Covenant carried into the Jewish Temple

While Catholics are sometimes accused of worshiping images, in violation of the first commandment, the Church says this is a misunderstanding. In the Church's opinion, "the honor paid to sacred images is a 'respectful veneration', not the adoration due to God alone". In the 8th century, heated arguments arose over whether religious icons (in this context paintings) were prohibited by the first commandment. The dispute was almost entirely restricted to the Eastern church; the iconoclasts wished to prohibit icons, while the iconodules supported their veneration, a position consistently backed by the Western Church. At the Second Council of Nicaea in 787, the ecumenical council determined that the veneration of icons and statues was not in violation of the commandment and stated "whoever venerates an image venerates the person portrayed in it." (Note: The Catholic Church believes that it is continually guided by the Holy Spirit and is thus protected from making a doctrinal error. The highest doctrinal authority of the Church rests in the decisions of the ecumenical councils, which are headed by the pope.) At around the time of the controversy over Iconoclasm, the Western church began to use monumental sculpture, which by the Romanesque period became a major feature of Western Christian art, that has remained part of the Catholic tradition, in contrast to Eastern Christianity, which avoids large religious sculpture. The Catechism, using very traditional arguments, posits that God gave permission for images that symbolize Christian salvation by leaving symbols such as the bronze serpent, and the cherubim on the Ark of the Covenant. It states that "by becoming incarnate, the Son of God introduced a new economy of images".

The United States Conference of Catholic Bishops (USCCB) explain the Catechism in their book entitled United States Catechism for Adults, published in 2006. Regarding graven images, they expound that this command addresses idolatry that in ancient times expressed itself in the worship of such things as the "sun, moon, stars, trees, bulls, eagles, and serpents" as well as "emperors and kings". They explain that today, idolatry expresses itself in the worship of other things, and list some as "power, money, materialism and sports."

== Second commandment ==
"You shall not take the name of the Lord your God in vain."
The second commandment according to the Catechism of the Catholic Church

The second commandment prohibits the use of God's name in vain. Many ancient cultures believed that names were sacred; some had prohibitions on when a person's name could be spoken. The Gospel of John relates an incident where a group of Jews attempted to stone Jesus after he used a sacred name of God to refer to himself. They interpreted his statement as a claim of divinity. Since they did not believe that he was God, they considered this blasphemy, which under Mosaic law carries a death penalty. Kreeft writes that all of the names by which God is known are holy, and thus all of those names are protected by the second commandment. The Catechism states, "Respect for his name is an expression of the respect owed to the mystery of God himself and to the whole sacred reality it evokes." The Catechism also requires respect for the names of people out of respect for the dignity of that person.

The sentiment behind this commandment is further codified in the Lord's Prayer, which begins, "Our Father who art in heaven, hallowed be thy name". According to Pope Benedict XVI, when God revealed his name to Moses he established a relationship with mankind; Benedict states that the Incarnation was the culmination of a process that "had begun with the giving of the divine name." Benedict elaborates that this means the divine name could be misused and that Jesus' inclusion of "hallowed be thy name" is a plea for the sanctification of God's name, to "protect the wonderful mystery of his accessibility to us, and constantly assert his true identity as opposed to our distortion of it".

According to Catholic teaching, this commandment does not preclude the use of God's name in taking solemn oaths administered by legitimate authority. However, lying under oath, invoking God's name for magical purposes, or voicing words of hatred or defiance against God are considered sins of blasphemy.

== Third commandment ==
"Remember the sabbath day, to keep it holy. Six days you shall labor, and do all your work; but the seventh day is a sabbath to the Lord your God; in it you shall not do any work."
The third commandment according to the Catechism of the Catholic Church

Quoting the Jewish rabbi and scholar Jacob Neusner, Pope Benedict XVI explains that to Israel, keeping this commandment was more than ritual; it was a way to imitate God, who rested on the seventh day after the creation. It also constituted the core of the social order.

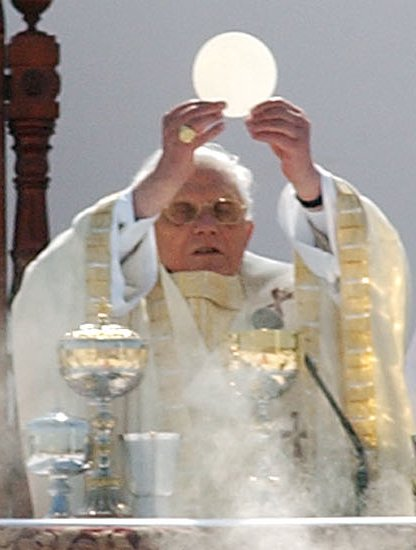
Pope Benedict XVI celebrates the Eucharist, a sacrament celebrated at every Catholic Mass

Although a few Christian denominations follow the Judaic practice of observing the Sabbath on Saturday, most Christian denominations, including the liturgical branches (Catholics, Eastern and Oriental Orthodox and the Churches of the East), observe Sunday as the special day for rest and worship, which they call the "Lord's Day". This practice dates to the first century, arising from their belief that Jesus rose from the dead on the first day of the week. (Note: Jewish Christians celebrated the Sabbath on the last day of the week and kept most of the Jewish commandments regarding the Sabbath. However, since the early centuries, most Gentile Christians have celebrated on the first day of the week, considering themselves free of many of the strictures of Jewish law.) The Didache calls on Christians to come together on the Lord's Day to break bread and give thanks, but the meaning of the "Lord's day" is in dispute since it cites the "preparation day" (prior to the Biblical Sabbath) as the proper day for fasting. Tertullian is the first to mention Sunday rest: "We, however (just as tradition has taught us), on the day of the Lord's Resurrection ought to guard not only against kneeling, but every posture and office of solicitude, deferring even our businesses lest we give any place to the devil" ("De orat.", xxiii; cf. "Ad nation.", I, xiii; "Apolog.", xvi).

In the sixth century, Caesarius of Arles taught that the whole glory of the Jewish Sabbath had been transferred to Sunday and that Christians must keep Sunday in the same way as the Jews were commanded to keep the Sabbath. The Council of Orléans in 538 reprobated this tendency, to apply the law of the Jewish Sabbath to the observance of the Christian Sunday, as Jewish and non-Christian.

Church leaders of later centuries inscribed Sunday rest into official teachings, and Christian governments have attempted to enforce the Sunday rest throughout history. For Catholics, Jesus' teaching that "the sabbath was made for man, not man for the sabbath" means that good works "when the needs of others demand it" can be part of the day of rest. The Catechism offers guidelines on how to observe the Lord's Day, which include attending Mass on Sundays and holy days of obligation. On these days, Catholics may not work or do activities that "hinder the worship due to God", but "performance of the works of mercy, and appropriate relaxation in a spirit of joy" are permitted.

According to the USCCB, this commandment "has been concretized for Catholics" as one of the Church precepts. The organization cites the papal encyclical Dies Domini, which states that it is "crucially important that all the faithful should be convinced that they cannot live their faith or share fully in the life of the Christian community unless they take part regularly in the Sunday Eucharistic assembly."

== Fourth commandment ==
"Honor your father and your mother, that your days may be long in the land which the Lord your God gives you."
The fourth commandment according to the Catechism of the Catholic Church

Pope Benedict XVI reinforced this commandment as "the heart of the social order." It strengthens generational relationships, makes explicit the connection between family order and societal stability, and reveals that the family is "both willed and protected by God." Because parents' love for their children should mirror God's love, and because they have a duty to pass the faith on to their children, the Catechism calls the family "a domestic church," "a privileged community," and the "original cell of social life."

The Catechism says this commandment requires duties of children to parents that include:

1. Respect toward parents that also flows to brothers and sisters.
2. Gratitude, as expressed in a quote from Sirach: "Remember that through your parents you were born; what can you give back to them that equals their gift to you?"
3. Obedience to parents for as long as the child lives at home "when it is for his good or the good of the family", except when obedience would require the child to do something morally wrong.
4. Support that requires grown children to offer material and moral support for their aging parents, particularly at times of "illness, loneliness, or distress".

Keeping this commandment, according to the Catechism, also requires duties of parents to children which include:

1. "Moral education, spiritual formation and evangelization" of their children.
2. Respect for their children as children of God and human persons.
3. Proper discipline for children while being careful not to provoke them.
4. "Avoiding pressure to choose a certain profession or spouse", which does not preclude parents from giving "judicious advice".
5. "Being a good example" to their children.
6. "Acknowledging their own failings" to their children to guide and correct them.

=== Jesus' expansion ===
The Gospel of Matthew relates that when told his mother and brothers were waiting to see him, Jesus replied, "Who is my mother and who are my brothers?" Stretching his hand over his disciples he said, "Here are my mother and my brothers! For whoever does the will of my Father in heaven is my brother, and my sister, and mother." Pope Benedict XVI stated that this dictum of Jesus brought the fourth commandment to a new and higher level. By doing God's will, any person can become part of the universal family of Jesus. Thus, the fourth commandment's responsibilities extend to the greater society and requires respect for "legitimate social authorities". The Catechism specifies "duties of citizens and nations", which Kreeft summarizes as:

1. "Obedience and honor" to "all who for our good have received authority in society from God".
2. "Payment of taxes, exercising the right to vote and defending one's country".
3. "An obligation to be vigilant and critical", which requires citizens to criticize that which harms human dignity and the community.
4. "A duty to disobey" civil authorities and directives that are contrary to the moral order.
5. "To practice charity", which is a "necessity for any working family or society"; it is the "greatest social commandment" and requires people to love God and neighbor.
6. "To welcome the foreigner" who is in need of security and livelihood that cannot be found in his own country.
7. "An obligation for rich nations to help poor nations", especially in times of "immediate need".
8. "An expectation for families to help other families".

== Fifth commandment ==
"You shall not kill."
The fifth commandment according to the Catechism of the Catholic Church

This commandment demands respect for human life and is more accurately translated as "thou shalt not murder." Indeed, killing may, under limited circumstances, be justified within Catholicism. Jesus expanded it to prohibit unjust anger, hatred and vengeance, and to require Christians to love their enemies. The basis of all Catholic teaching about the fifth commandment is the sanctity of life ethic, which Kreeft argues is philosophically opposed to the quality of life ethic, a philosophy which he characterizes as introduced by a book entitled Die Freigabe der Vernichtung des Lebensunwerten Lebens (The Permission to Destroy Life Unworthy of Life) (see Life unworthy of life) and which he asserts was the "first to win public acceptance ... by German doctors before World War II—the basis and beginning of Nazi medical practices." This interpretation is supported by modern medical journals that discuss the dilemma posed by these opposing philosophies to physicians who must make life or death decisions. Some bioethicists characterize the use of the "Nazi analogy" as inappropriate when applied to quality of life decisions; Arthur Caplan called this rhetoric "odiously wrong". The Church is actively involved in the public debates over abortion, capital punishment and euthanasia, and encourages believers to support legislation and politicians it describes as pro-life.

=== Abortion ===
The Catechism states: "Human life is sacred because from its beginning it involves the creative action of God and it remains forever in a special relationship with the Creator, who is its sole end. ... no one can under any circumstance claim for himself the right directly to destroy an innocent human being." Direct and intentional killing of an innocent human is considered a mortal sin. Considered by the Church to be of an even greater gravity is the murder of family members, including "infanticide, fratricide, parricide, the murder of a spouse and procured abortion."

The Catechism states that the embryo "must be treated from conception as a person". The Latin original of as is tamquam, meaning "like" or "just as". That a human individual's existence begins at fertilization is the accepted position of the Roman Catholic Church, whose Pontifical Academy for Life declared: "The moment that marks the beginning of the existence of a new 'human being' is constituted by the penetration of sperm into the oocyte. Fertilization promotes a series of linked events and transforms the egg cell into a 'zygote'."; respect for life at all stages, even potential life, is generally the context of church documents.

Abortion has been specifically and persistently condemned by the Church since the first century. (Note: Some pro-choice advocates assert that, in the past, the Church has distinguished between termination of a pregnancy before and after quickening. They argue that Augustine accepted the Aristotelian Greek Pagan concept of "delayed ensoulment", writing that a human soul cannot live in an unformed body. Thomas Aquinas asserted that a fetus was not fully alive until quickening. Some scholars disagree with these interpretations of Aquinas and Augustine, saying their statements cannot be used to justify abortion in today's society since both of these scholars condemned the practice.) "Formal cooperation" in abortion incurs the penalty of excommunication "by the very commission of the offense" (Lat. latae sententiae, "sentence [already, i.e. automatically] passed"). The Catechism emphasizes that this penalty is not meant to restrict mercy, but that it makes clear the gravity of the crime and the irreparable harm done to the child, its parents and society. "Formal cooperation" in abortion extends not just to the mother who freely submits, but also to the doctor, nurses and anyone who directly aids in the act. The Church has ministries of reconciliation, such as Project Rachel, for those who sincerely repent of their sin of formal cooperation in abortion.

Official Church teaching allows for medical procedures and treatments intended to protect or restore the mother's health if she would be in mortal danger without them, even when such procedures carry some risk of death to the fetus. Examples include the removal of a fallopian tube in the case of an ectopic pregnancy, removal of a pregnant cancerous uterus, or an appendectomy.

==== Use of embryos for research or fertilization ====
The United States Catechism for Adults devotes a section to in vitro fertilization, stem-cell research and cloning in its explanation of the fifth commandment, because these often involve the destruction of human embryos, considered to be a gravely sinful form of murder. Embryonic stem cell research is called "an immoral means to a good end" and "morally unacceptable." Citing the Congregation for the Doctrine of the Faith's Instruction on Respect for Human Life in its Origin and on the Dignity of Procreation, the US Bishops quote: "No objective, even though noble in itself, such as a foreseeable advantage to science, to other human beings, or to society, can in any way justify experimentation on living human embryos or fetuses, whether viable or not, either inside or outside the mother's body." The Bishops note that adult stem cell research, using cells obtained with informed consent, is a promising field of research that is morally acceptable.

=== Suicide, euthanasia ===
The fifth commandment forbids suicide and the mercy killing of those who are dying, even to eliminate suffering. The ordinary care of those facing an imminent death may not morally be withheld, according to the Church. "Ordinary care" refers to food, water and pain relief, and does not include "extraordinary care", which refers to the use of respirators or feeding tubes that are considered discretionary. Allowing a terminally ill person to die, using painkillers that may shorten their life, or refusing extraordinary treatment to the terminally ill such as chemotherapy or radiation, are considered morally acceptable and not a violation of the fifth commandment, in accordance with the principle of double effect.

=== Capital punishment ===
For the first two hundred years, Christians "refused to kill in the military, in self-defense, or in the judicial system", but there was no official Church position on the death penalty. When the Church was first officially recognized as a public institution in 313, its attitude toward capital punishment became one of toleration but not outright acceptance. The death penalty had support from early Catholic theologians, though some of them such as Saint Ambrose encouraged members of the clergy not to pronounce or carry out capital punishment. Saint Augustine answered objections to capital punishment rooted in the first commandment in The City of God. Thomas Aquinas and Duns Scotus argued that civil authority to carry out capital punishment was supported by scripture. Pope Innocent III required Peter Waldo and the Waldensians to accept that "secular power can, without mortal sin, exercise judgement of blood, provided that it punishes with justice, not out of hatred, with prudence, not precipitation" as a prerequisite for reconciliation with the church. Paul Suris states that official Church teachings have neither absolutely condemned nor promoted capital punishment, but toleration of it has fluctuated throughout the ages. The Inquisitions provide the most memorable instance of Church support for capital punishment, although some historians considered these more lenient than the secular courts of the period.

On August 2, 2018, the church adopted the view that capital punishment is "inadmissible" as it violates the dignity of mankind. The Catechism of the Catholic Church proclaims that "in the light of the Gospel" the death penalty is "an attack on the inviolability and dignity of the person." Pope Francis proclaimed that even life imprisonment is a form of torture and "a hidden death penalty."

=== Personal health, dead bodies, burial ===
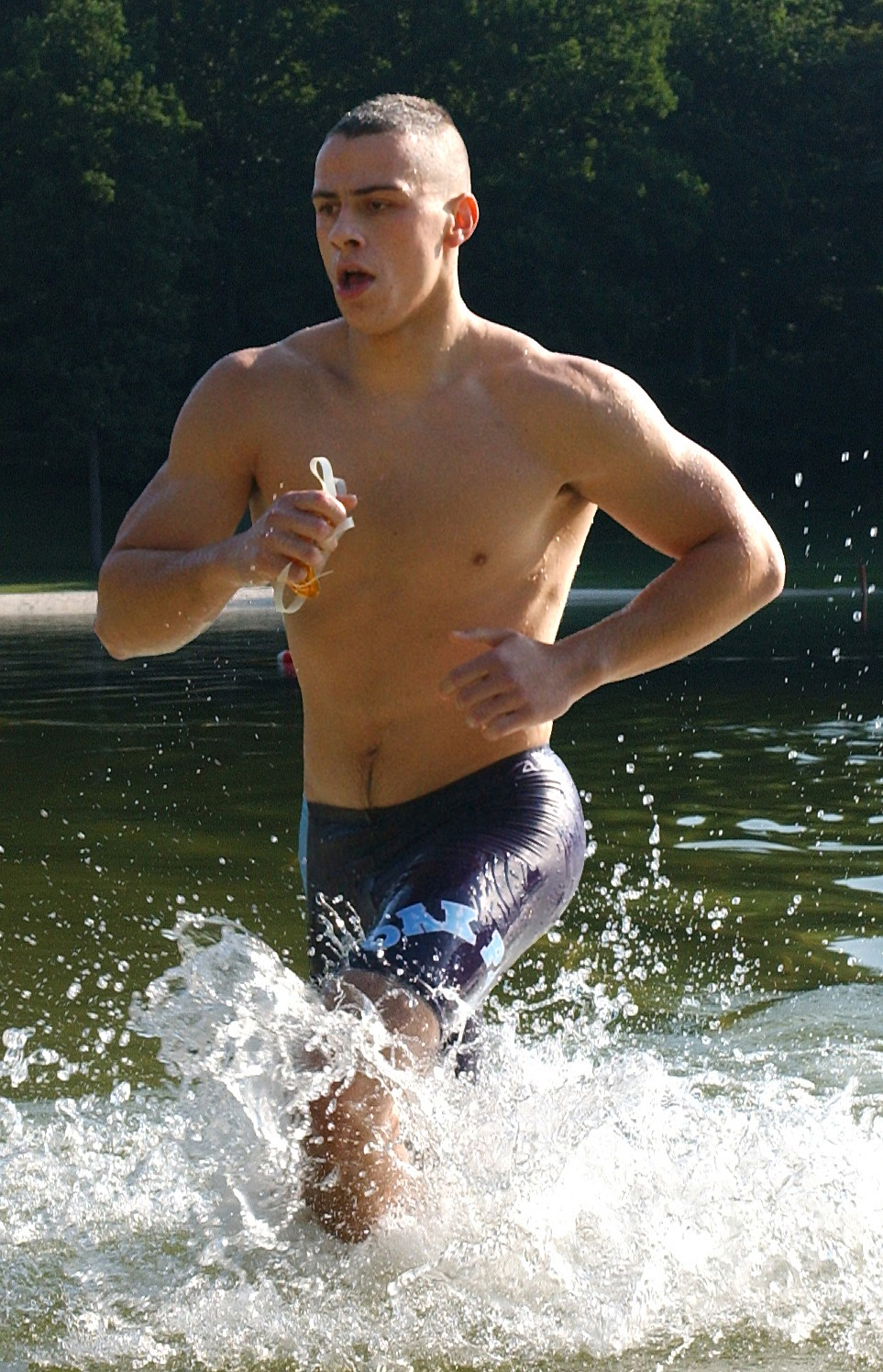
Catholic doctrine includes respect for one's own body in compliance with the fifth commandment, but warns against "idolizing" physical perfection.

According to Church teaching, respect for human life requires respect for one's own body, precluding unhealthy behavior, the abuse of food, alcohol, medicines, illegal drugs, tattoos and piercings. The Church also warns against the opposite behavior of "excessive preoccupation with the health and welfare of the body that 'idolizes' physical perfection, fitness, and success at sports."

Kidnapping, terrorism, and torture are forbidden, as well as sterilizations, amputations and mutilations that are not for therapeutic medical reasons. According to the Catechism, societies have a moral obligation to strive to provide healthy living conditions for all people.

Church belief in the resurrection of the body led to a prohibition against cremation that was pastorally modified at the Second Vatican Council in the 1960s under limited circumstances, but those conditions have been largely ignored even by the clergy. According to the Catechism, burial of the dead is a corporal work of mercy that must treat the body with respect and love (e.g. scattering of cremated remains, burial in an unmarked grave, etc. are forbidden in the Catholic Church). Organ donation after death and organ transplants under certain terms, also autopsies for legal and scientific reasons are permitted.

=== War and self-defense ===
In the Sermon on the Mount, Jesus recalls the commandment, "You shall not kill" and then adds to it the proscriptions against anger, hatred and vengeance. Going further, Christ asks his disciples to love their enemies. The Catechism asserts that "it is legitimate to insist on respect for one's own right to life." Kreeft says, "self-defense is legitimate for the same reason suicide is not: because one's own life is a gift from God, a treasure we are responsible for preserving and defending." The Catechism teaches that "someone who defends his life is not guilty of murder even if he is forced to deal his aggressor a lethal blow." Legitimate defense can be not only a right but a grave duty for one who is responsible for the lives of others. The defense of the common good requires that an unjust aggressor be rendered unable to cause harm. For this reason, those who legitimately hold authority also have the right to use arms to repel aggressors against the civil community entrusted to their responsibility.

The Church requires all to pray and work to prevent unjust wars, but allows for just wars if certain conditions are met:

1. The reasons for going to war are defensive.
2. "The damage inflicted by the aggressor ... must be lasting, grave, and certain."
3. It is a last resort taken only after all other means of putting an end to the "grave damage" have been ineffective.
4. The ultimate aim is peace and there is a serious chance of success.
5. No graver evils are produced that overshadow the evil to be eliminated. This forbids the use of arms to eliminate whole cities and areas with their inhabitants.
6. Respect and care is required for non-combatants, wounded soldiers and prisoners. Soldiers are required to disobey commands to commit genocide and ones that violate universal principles.

=== Scandal ===
The Catechism classifies scandal under the fifth commandment and defines it as "an attitude or behavior which leads another to do evil". In the Gospel of Matthew, Jesus stated, "Whoever causes one of these little ones who believe in me to sin, it would be better for him to have a great millstone fastened round his neck and to be drowned in the depth of the sea." The Church considers it a serious crime to cause another's faith, hope and love to be weakened, especially if it is done to young people and the perpetrator is a person of authority such as a parent, teacher or priest.

== Sixth commandment ==
"You shall not commit adultery."
The sixth commandment according to the Catechism of the Catholic Church

According to the Catholic Church, humans are sexual beings whose sexual identity should be accepted in the unity of body and soul. The sexes are meant by divine design to be different and complementary, each having equal dignity and made in the image of God. Sexual acts (Note: The Catechism uses the words "acts in marriage" and quotes from Gaudium et spes: "The acts in marriage by which the intimate and chaste union of the spouses takes place are noble and honorable; the truly human performance of these acts fosters the self-giving they signify and enriches the spouses in joy and gratitude.") are sacred within the context of the marital relationship that reflects a "complete and lifelong mutual gift of a man and a woman." Sexual sins thus violate not just the body but the person's whole being. In his 1995 book Crossing the Threshold of Hope, John Paul II reflected on this concept:

After all, young people are always searching for the beauty in love. They want their love to be beautiful. If they give in to weakness, following the models of behavior that can rightly be considered a 'scandal in the contemporary world' (and these are, unfortunately, widely diffused models), in the depths of their hearts they still desire a beautiful and pure love. This is as true of boys as it is of girls. Ultimately, they know that only God can give them this love. As a result, they are willing to follow Christ, without caring about the sacrifices this may entail.

Like Orthodox Judaism and Islam, the Catholic Church considers all sexual acts outside of marriage to be grave sins. The gravity of the sin "'excludes one from sacramental communion' until repented of and forgiven in sacramental confession."

=== Vocation to chastity ===
Church teaching on the sixth commandment includes a discussion on chastity. The Catechism describes chastity as a "moral virtue ... a gift from God, a grace, a fruit of spiritual effort." The Church sees sex as more than a physical act; it also affects body and soul, so the Church teaches that chastity is a virtue all people are called to acquire. It is defined as the inner unity of a person's "bodily and spiritual being" that successfully integrates a person's sexuality with his or her "entire human nature." To acquire this virtue, followers are encouraged to enter into the "long and exacting work" of self-mastery that is helped by friendships, God's grace, maturity and education "that respects the moral and spiritual dimensions of human life." The Catechism categorizes violations of the sixth commandment into two categories: "offenses against chastity" and "offenses against the dignity of marriage".

==== Offenses against chastity ====
The Catechism lists the following "offenses against chastity", in increasing order of gravity according to Kreeft:

1. Lust: the Church teaches that sexual pleasure is good and created by God, who meant for spouses to "experience pleasure and enjoyment of body and spirit". Kreeft says, "Lust does not mean sexual pleasure as such, nor the delight in it, nor the desire for it in its right context." Lust is the desire for sexual pleasure alone, outside its intended purpose of procreation and the uniting of man and woman, body and soul, in mutual self-donation.
2. Masturbation is considered sinful for the same reasons as lust, but is a step above lust in that it involves a physical act instead of a mental one.
3. Fornication is the sexual union of an unmarried man and an unmarried woman. This is considered contrary to "the dignity of persons and of human sexuality" because it is not ordered to the "good of spouses" or the "generation and education of children."
4. Pornography ranks higher because it is considered a perversion of the sexual act that is intended for distribution to third parties for viewing.
5. Prostitution is considered sinful for both the prostitute and the customer; it reduces a person to an instrument of sexual pleasure, violating human dignity and harming society. The gravity of the sinfulness is less for prostitutes who are forced into the act by destitution, blackmail or social pressure.
6. Rape is an intrinsically evil act that can cause grave damage to the victim for life.
7. Incest, or "rape of children by parents or other adult relatives" or "those responsible for the education of the children entrusted to them" is considered the most heinous of sexual sins.

==== Homosexuality ====
The Catechism devotes a separate section to homosexuality within its explanation of the sixth commandment. Like heterosexual acts outside of marriage, homosexual acts are considered sins. The Church distinguishes between homosexual attractions, which are not considered sinful, and homosexual acts, which are. The Catechism states that they "violate natural law, cannot bring forth life, and do not proceed from a genuine affective and sexual complementarity. Under no circumstances can they be approved." The Church teaches that a homosexual inclination is "objectively disordered" and can be a great trial for the person, who the Church teaches must be "accepted with respect, compassion and sensitivity ... unjust discrimination in their regard should be avoided."

Homosexuals are, according to the Church, "called to chastity". They are instructed to practice the virtues of "self-mastery" that teaches "inner freedom" using the support of friends, prayer and grace found in the sacraments of the Church. These tools are meant to help homosexuals "gradually and resolutely approach Christian perfection", which is a state to which all Christians are called.

(Two lay movements represent opposing philosophies regarding homosexuality: DignityUSA seeks to change the Church's teachings to justify homosexual acts; Courage International is an organization of homosexuals who "support each other in the sincere effort to live in chastity and in fidelity to Christ and his Church".)

=== Love of husband and wife ===
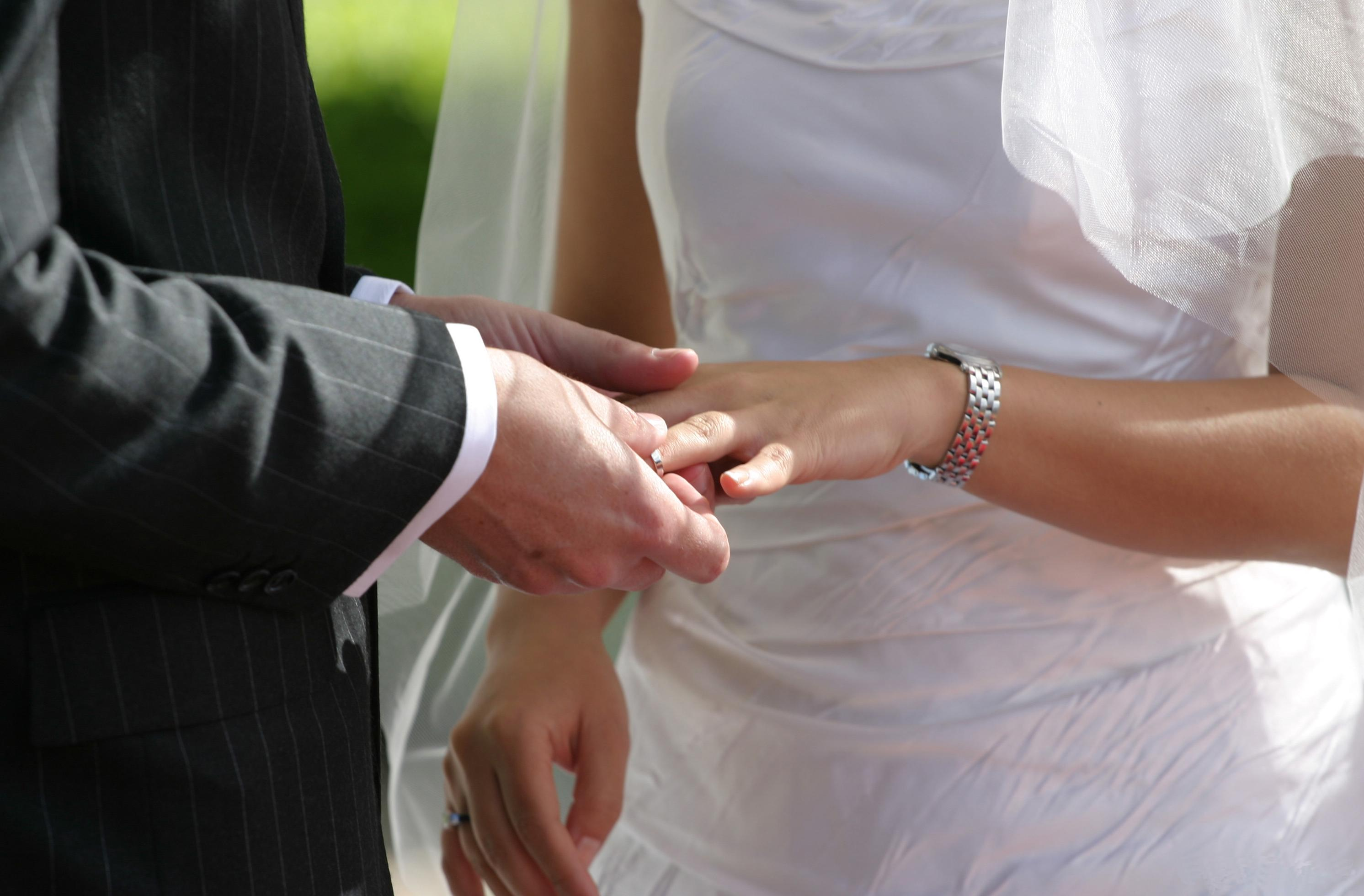
The sixth commandment, according to the USCCB, "summons spouses" to an emotional and sexual fidelity they call "essential" to marriage and is reflective of God's "fidelity to us."

According to Church teaching, spousal love is intended to form an unbroken, two-fold end: the union of husband and wife and the transmission of life. The unitive aspect includes the transference of each partner's being "so that they are no longer two but one flesh." The sacrament of matrimony is viewed as God's sealing the consent which binds the partners together. Church teaching on the marital state requires spousal acceptance of each other's failures and faults, and the recognition that the "call to holiness in marriage" is one that requires a process of spiritual growth and conversion that can last throughout life.

==== Fecundity of marriage, sexual pleasure, birth control ====
The Church position on sexual activity can be summarized as: "sexual activity belongs only in marriage as an expression of total self-giving and union, and always open to the possibility of new life." Sexual acts in marriage are considered "noble and honorable" and are meant to be enjoyed with "joy and gratitude." Sexuality is to be reserved to marriage: "by its very nature conjugal love requires the inviolable fidelity of the spouses. This is the consequence of the gift of themselves which they make to each other. Love seeks to be definitive; it cannot be an arrangement 'until further notice.'" The "intimate union of marriage, as a mutual giving of two persons, and the good of the children, demand total fidelity from the spouses and require an unbreakable union between them." (Gaudium et spes)".

Artificial birth control predates Christianity; the Catholic Church has condemned these methods throughout its history. In response to the Church of England accepting the practice of artificial contraception in 1930, the Catholic Church issued the papal encyclical Casti connubii on 31 December 1930. The 1968 papal encyclical Humanae vitae is a reaffirmation of the Catholic Church's traditional view of marriage and marital relations, and a continued condemnation of artificial birth control.

The Church sees large families as a sign of God's blessing. "By its very nature the institution of marriage and married love is ordered to the procreation and education of the offspring and it is in them that it finds its crowning glory." (Gaudium et spes) Children are the supreme gift of marriage and contribute greatly to the good of the parents themselves. (...) true married love and the whole structure of family life which results from it, without diminishment of the other ends of marriage, are directed to disposing the spouses to cooperate valiantly with the love of the Creator and Savior, who through them will increase and enrich his family from day to day. (Gaudium et spes)." It recognizes that responsible parenthood sometimes calls for reasonable spacing or limiting of births and considers natural family planning as morally acceptable, but rejects all methods of artificial contraception. The Church rejects all forms of artificial insemination and fertilization because the techniques divorce the sexual act from the creation of a child. The Catechism states, "A child is not something owed to one, but is a gift ... 'the supreme gift of marriage.'"

Roderick Hindery, a teacher of moral theology, voiced disagreement on the Church's support for natural family planning, and contends that it contributes to overpopulation and poverty. Celia W. Dugger of the New York Times criticizes the Church's rejection of condom use, in particular with regard to countries where the incidence of AIDS and HIV has reached epidemic proportions. Brenda Wilson of NPR says that Catholics cite countries such as Kenya and Uganda, where behavioral changes are encouraged instead of condom use, and where greater progress in controlling the disease has been made than in countries that promote condom use alone.

==== Offenses against the dignity of marriage ====
According to the Church, adultery and divorce are considered offenses against the dignity of marriage and are defined as follows:

1. Adultery is the sexual union of a man and woman where at least one is married to someone else. It is for this reason that the Church considers it a greater sin than fornication. Kreeft states, "The adulterer sins against his spouse, his society, and his children as well as his own body and soul."
2. Divorce: According to the Catholic New American Bible translation, Jesus taught, "whoever divorces his wife (unless the marriage is unlawful) causes her to commit adultery, and whoever marries a divorced woman commits adultery." Explaining Church interpretation of this teaching, Kreeft says Jesus considered divorce to be an accommodation that had slipped into Jewish law. The Church teaches that marriage was created by God and was meant to be indissoluble: like the creation of a child that cannot be "un-created", neither can the "one flesh" of the marriage bond. The Catechism states, "Divorce is a grave offense against the natural law. It claims to break the contract, to which the spouses freely consented, to live with each other till death." By marrying another, the divorced person adds to the gravity of the offense as the remarried spouse is considered to be in a state of "public and permanent adultery".

The Compendium of the Catechism 502 lists other offenses against the dignity of marriage: "polygamy, incest, free unions (cohabitation, concubinage), and sexual acts before or outside of marriage".

==== Separation, civil divorce, annulments ====
According to the Church, there are situations that do not equate to divorce:

1. In extreme situations, such as domestic violence, separation is allowed. This is not considered a divorce and may be justified.
2. Civil divorce is not a divorce according to the Church. If it is deemed to be the only way of ensuring legal rights, care of children, or protection of inheritance, the Church considers it morally acceptable.
3. Annulment is not a divorce; it is a ruling by the Church that the marriage was never valid. The marriage is deemed invalid if it lacks one of five integral elements: it should be "complete", "lifelong", "mutual", a "free gift" and of "man and woman". According to Pope John Paul II's Address to the Roman Rota on 22 January 1996, couples do not have a right to an annulment, but do have a right to make their case for nullity or validity before "the competent Church authority and to request a decision in the matter." According to the Catholic Diocese of Arlington:
  ... signs that might indicate reasons to investigate for an annulment are: marriage that excluded at the time of the wedding the right to children, or to a permanent marriage, or to an exclusive commitment. In addition, there are youthful marriages; marriages of very short duration; marriages marked by serious emotional, physical, or substance abuse; deviant sexual practices; profound and consistent irresponsibility and lack of commitment; conditional consent to a marriage; fraud or deceit to elicit spousal consent; serious mental illness; or a previous bond of marriage. The determination of the ground should be made after extensive consultation with the parish priest or deacons, and based upon the proofs that are available.

== Seventh commandment ==
"You shall not steal."
The seventh commandment according to the Catechism of the Catholic Church

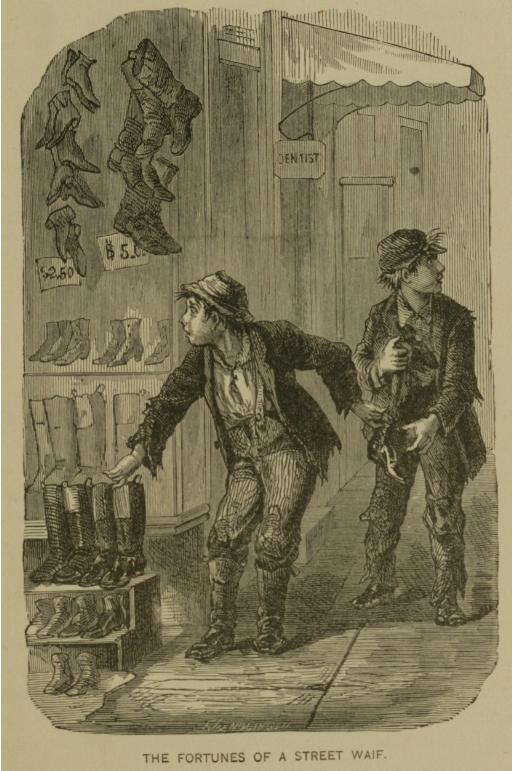
Taking another's property "in obvious and urgent necessity" as the only way to provide for "immediate essential needs" is not considered a sin against the seventh commandment.

The Catechism explains that this commandment regulates worldly goods, and forbids unjustly taking, using or damaging those that belong to someone else. It places requirements upon those who possess worldly goods to use them responsibly, taking into consideration the good of society. The Catechism addresses the concept of human stewardship of God's creation in its explanation of the seventh commandment and forbids abuse of animals and the environment.

=== Private property ===
According to the Church, people have a right to private property. However, ownership makes that person "a steward" who is expected to make it "fruitful" or profitable in a way that benefits others after that person has first taken care of their family. Private property and the common good are seen as complementary elements that exist for the purpose of strengthening society. The taking of another's private property "in obvious and urgent necessity" as "the only way to provide for immediate, essential needs (food, shelter, clothing)" is not considered by the Church to be stealing. The concept of slavery as private property is condemned by the Church, which classifies it as the stealing of a person's human rights.

=== Theft ===
According to the Catechism, theft or stealing means "usurping another's property against the reasonable will of the owner" though exclusion exists for someone in great need to survive. "Unjustly taking and keeping the property of others" considered as theft, even if the act is outside the scope of civil law. Cardinal Christoph Schönborn once used the example of Saint Augustine's theft of his neighbor's pears in his youth, as recorded in his Confessions. Cardinal Schönborn points out that Augustine still has "pangs of conscience over a childish theft" even when he became grown person, indicating that human conscience is very aware of acts of theft, even if the act itself is legal under civil law.

The following acts are also considered as violation of the seventh commandment: price manipulation to get advantage on the harm of others, corruption, appropriation of the public goods for personal interests, work poorly carried out, tax avoidance, counterfeiting of checks or any means of payment, any forms of copyright infringement and piracy, and extravagance.

=== Social justice ===
The papal encyclical Rerum novarum discusses the relationships and mutual duties between labor and capital, as well as government and its citizens. Of primary concern was the need for some amelioration for "the misery and wretchedness pressing so unjustly on the majority of the working class". The encyclical supported the right to form unions, rejected socialism, communism and unrestricted capitalism, and affirmed the right to private property.

Church interpretation of the seventh commandment teaches that business owners should balance a desire for profits that will ensure the future of the business with a responsibility toward the "good of persons". Business owners are required to pay their workers a reasonable wage, honor contracts, and abstain from dishonest activity, including bribery of government officials. Workers are required to do their jobs conscientiously, as they have been hired to do them, and to avoid dishonesty in the workplace, such as using office goods for personal use without permission (embezzlement).

The Church teaches that a balance should exist between government regulation and the laws of the marketplace. It deems that sole reliance on the marketplace (pure capitalism) insufficiently addresses many human needs, while sole reliance on government regulation (pure socialism) "perverts the basis of social bonds". The Church warns about the danger of either capitalism or socialism, as these systems tend to use excessive extremes that result in injustice to persons.

Wealthier nations, like wealthier individuals, have a moral obligation to help poorer nations and individuals, and work to reform financial institutions and economic factors to benefit all.

== Eighth commandment ==
"You shall not bear false witness against your neighbor."
The eighth commandment according to the Catechism of the Catholic Church

The Catechism explains that bearing false witness or "speaking a falsehood with the intention of deceiving" encompasses all violations of truth. These violations have degrees of gravity depending on the "intentions of the one who lies and the harms suffered by its victims." Listed as follows, these are:

1. False witness and perjury: statements made publicly in court which obstruct justice by condemning the innocent or exonerating the guilty, or which may increase the punishment of the accused.
2. Rash judgement: believing, without sufficient evidence, that a person has done moral faults.
3. Detraction: the disclosure of another's faults without a valid reason.
4. Calumny: lying to harm a person's reputation and providing opportunity to others to make false judgements concerning them.
5. Flattery: "speech to deceive others for our benefit."
6. Bragging, boasting, or mocking: speech which either only honors oneself or dishonors others.

The Church requires those who have damaged the reputation of another to "make reparation for the untruth they have communicated." However, it does not require a person to reveal a truth to someone who does not have a right to know, and teaches respect for a right to privacy. Priests are prohibited from violating the seal of confession no matter how grave the sin or its impact on society.

Included in the Church teachings of this commandment is the requirement for Christians to bear witness to their faith "without equivocation" in situations that require it. The use of modern media in spreading untruths, by individuals, businesses or governments, is condemned.

== Ninth commandment ==
"You shall not covet your neighbor's house; you shall not covet your neighbor's wife, or his manservant, or his maidservant, or his ox, or anything that is your neighbor's." (Note: The wording of the ninth commandment in the Catechism is almost identical to that of the tenth. In its explanation, the Catechism states "St. John distinguishes three kinds of covetousness or concupiscence: lust of the flesh, lust of the eyes, and pride of life." "In the Catholic catechetical tradition, the ninth commandment forbids carnal concupiscence; the tenth forbids coveting another's goods." The Catechism defines "carnal concupiscence" as an intense desire of the flesh, "the movement of the sensitive appetite contrary to the operation of the human reason", and "the rebellion of the 'flesh' against the 'spirit'". The tenth commandment, according to Church interpretation, deals with all other forms of intense desire. The Catechism states that the tenth "unfolds and completes the ninth ... It forbids coveting the goods of another".)
The ninth commandment according to the Catechism of the Catholic Church

The ninth and tenth commandments deal with coveting, an interior disposition, not a physical act. The Catechism supposedly distinguishes between covetousness of the flesh (improper sexual desire) and covetousness for another's worldly goods, i.e. the ninth commandment deals with the former and the tenth the latter. However, the two commandments are almost identical except for the words "neighbor's wife" and "his field", and both include covetousness of the flesh and worldly goods.

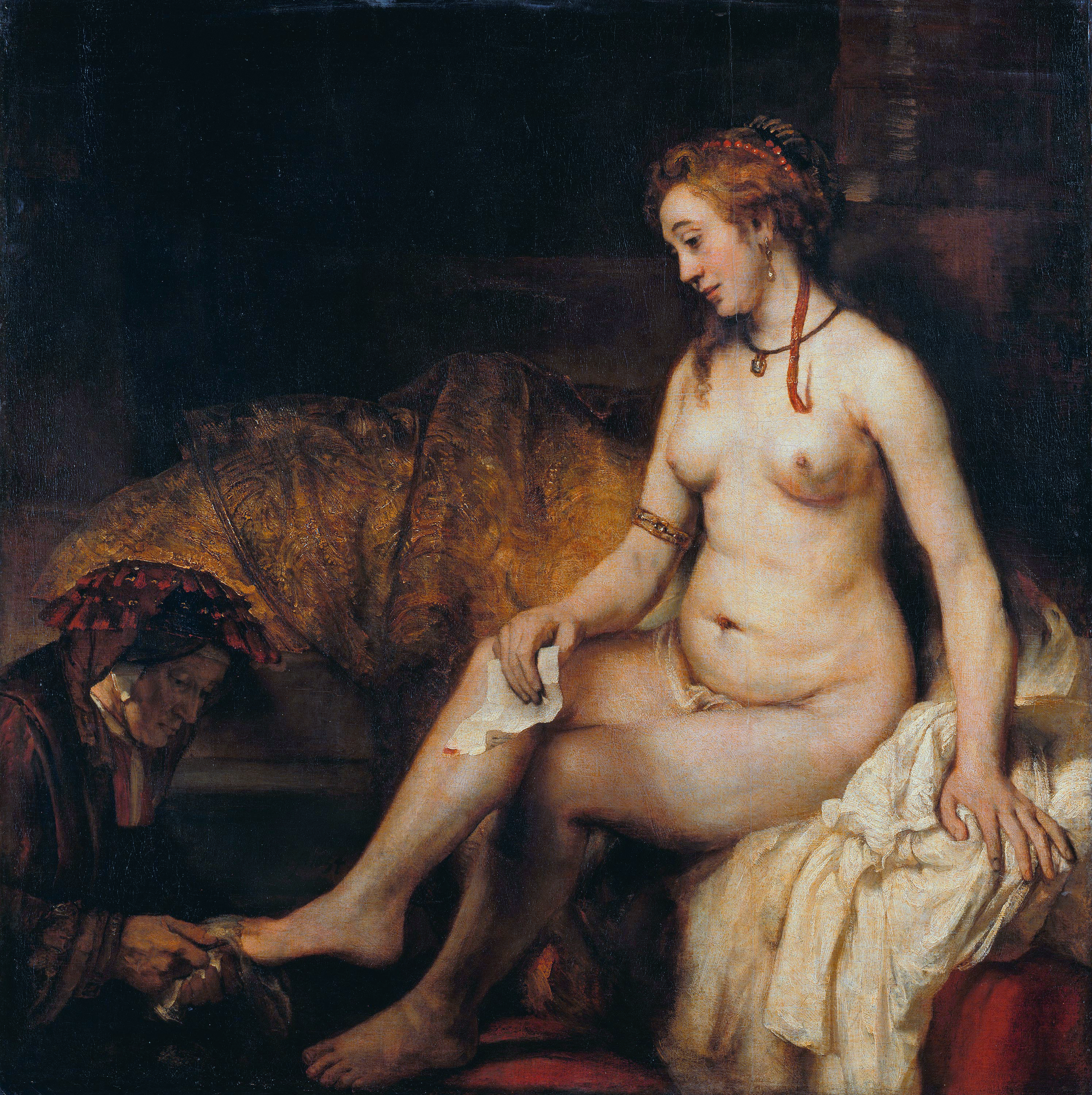
Bathsheba at Her Bath by Rembrandt, 1654. The story of King David and Bathsheba illustrates covetousness that led to the sins of adultery and murder.

Jesus emphasized the need for pure thoughts as well as actions, and stated, "Everyone who looks at a woman lustfully has already committed adultery with her in his heart" (Matthew 5:28). The Catechism states that, with the help of God's grace, men and women are required to overcome lust and bodily desires "for sinful relationships with another person's spouse." In Theology of the Body, a series of lectures given by Pope John Paul II, Jesus' statement in Matthew 5:28 is interpreted that one can commit adultery in the heart not only with another's spouse, but also with his/her own spouse if one looks at him/her lustfully or treats him/her "only as an object to satisfy instinct".

Purity of heart is suggested as the necessary quality needed to accomplish this task; common Catholic prayers and hymns include a request for this virtue. The Church identifies gifts of God that help a person maintain purity:

1. Chastity, which enables people to love others with upright and undivided hearts.
2. Purity of intention, which seeks to fulfill God's will in everything, knowing that it alone will lead to the true end of man.
3. Purity of vision, "external and internal", disciplining the thoughts and imagination to reject those that are impure.
4. Prayer that recognizes the power of God to grant a person the ability to overcome sexual desires.
5. Modesty, of the feelings as well as the body is discreet in choice of words and clothing.

Jesus stated, "Blessed are the clean of heart, for they shall see God." This purity of heart, which the ninth commandment introduces, is the "precondition of the vision of God" and allows the person to see situations and people as God sees. The Catechism teaches that "there is a connection between purity of heart, of body and of faith."

== Tenth commandment ==
"You shall not covet ... anything that is your neighbor's. ... You shall not desire your neighbor's house, his field, or his manservant, or his maidservant, or his ox, or anything that is your neighbor's."
The tenth commandment according to the Catechism of the Catholic Church

Detachment from riches is the goal of the tenth commandment and the first Beatitude ("blessed are the poor in spirit") because, according to the Catechism, this precept is necessary for entrance into the Kingdom of heaven. Covetousness is prohibited by the tenth commandment because it is considered to be the first step toward commission of theft, robbery and fraud; these lead to violence and injustice. The Church defines covetousness as a "disordered desire" that can take different forms:

1. Greed is the desire for too much of what one does not need.
2. Envy is the desire for what belongs to another. The US Bishops define it as "an attitude that fills us with sadness at the sight of another's prosperity."

Explaining Church teaching of this commandment, Kreeft cites Saint Thomas Aquinas, who wrote, "An evil desire can only be overcome by a stronger good desire." The US Bishops suggest that this can be achieved through cultivation of goodwill, humility and gratitude for one's own and others' blessings, while trusting in God's grace. Kreeft explains that Saint Paul the Apostle illustrated the concept in his letter to the Philippians when he listed his worldly credentials as a respected Jew and stated, "I count everything as loss because of the surpassing worth of knowing Christ Jesus my Lord." As Jesus stated, "What shall it profit a man if he shall gain the whole world, and lose his own soul?" Church teaching on the tenth commandment is directed toward this same attitude toward worldly goods, termed "poverty of spirit".

== See also ==
- Commandments of the Church
- Index of Catholic Church articles
- Relations between Catholicism and Judaism
