= John Ireland (Anglican priest) =

English Anglican priest, Dean of Westminster

The Very Reverend John Ireland
- Dean of Westminster
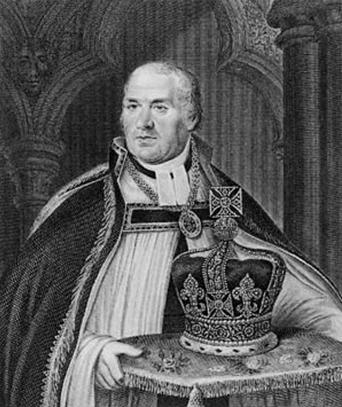
- Dean Ireland, engraving by James Stow
- Church: Church of England
- In office: 1816 to 1842
- Predecessor: William Vincent
- Successor: Thomas Turton

Orders
- Ordination: c. 1783

Personal details
- Born: 8 September 1761
- Died: 2 September 1842 (aged 80)
- Denomination: Anglicanism

John Ireland (8 September 1761 – 2 September 1842) was an English Anglican priest, who served as Dean of Westminster from 1816 until his death. In this role, he carried the crown during the coronation services at Westminster Abbey of two monarchs (George IV in 1821, William IV in 1831). Theologically and politically conservative, as shown in his writings, he was generous with the considerable riches that he acquired during his career, making large donations to support education and relieve poverty in his home town. In 1831, as Ireland was "a distinguished Benefactor of the University", Oxford had sought and obtained his permission to put on display a marble bust of him by the sculptor Sir Francis Leggatt Chantrey. The bust is now in the Examination Schools of the university. During his lifetime, he established scholarships at the University of Oxford, and in his will, he left money to establish the post of Dean Ireland's Professor of the Exegesis of Holy Scripture.

== Life ==
Ireland was the son of Thomas Ireland, a butcher from Ashburton, Devon; his mother was called Elizabeth. He was born in Asbburton on 8 September 1761 and was taught at the grammar school there before moving to the University of Oxford. He matriculated at Oxford on 8 December 1779, as a member of Oriel College. He obtained his Bachelor of Arts degree in June 1783; he later obtained the degrees of Master of Arts (June 1810), and Bachelor and Doctor of Divinity (October 1810). After obtaining his first degree, he was ordained as a priest in the Church of England, and was a curate near his home town for a time, before travelling abroad with the son of Sir James Wright, 1st Baronet, acting as the boy's tutor. He was then vicar of Croydon, south of London, between 1793 and 1816.

== Westminster Abbey ==
As well as ministering in Croydon, he was chaplain to the statesman Charles Jenkinson, 1st Earl of Liverpool, who used his influence to have Ireland appointed as a prebend of Westminster Abbey in 1802. Ireland rose to become subdean in 1806, and was additionally appointed as the Abbey's theological lecturer – the post dated from the time of Queen Elizabeth I, but had fallen into disuse. In this capacity, he addressed the king's scholars at the adjoining Westminster School between 1806 and 1812, and preached to the House of Commons at St Margaret's Church, Westminster in 1813. He was offered, but declined, the position of Regius Professor of Divinity at Oxford at this time.

The Dean of Westminster, William Vincent, died in December 1815; Ireland was chosen as his successor and was installed in February 1816. In addition, he was Dean of the Order of the Bath and rector of Islip, Oxfordshire (holding the latter post, which was under the control of the Abbey, from 1816 to 1835). As Dean, he had the right of carrying the crown at the coronation service; he did so in 1821 for George IV and in 1831 for William IV. He was too ill for this role in 1838, when Victoria was crowned, and his place was taken by the subdean. Ireland remained Dean of Westminster until his death in 1842.

== Wealth and benefactions ==
Ireland became rich through his ecclesiastical appointments, but he made a number of charitable donations in his lifetime, and was regarded as generous with his money. In 1825, he founded four scholarships at Oxford "for the promotion of classical learning and taste" at a personal cost of £4,000 (approximately £323,000 as of 2025). Westminster School received £500 to institute prizes for Latin verse. A further £2,000 was donated to Ashburton to purchase a house for the schoolmaster, together with money for its repair and an annual fund for the assistance of elderly residents. At his death, he left more than £20,000 (over £1.96 million as of 2025); £10,000 went to the University of Oxford to establish the post of Dean Ireland's Professor of the Exegesis of Holy Scripture, and a further £2,000 went to Oriel College. A gift of £5,000 to build a new church in Westminster was later declared to be legally invalid.

== Publications ==
Some of his sermons from his time in Croydon were published in 1796 as Five Discourses... for and against the Reception of Christianity by the Antient Jews and Greeks. Lectures at Westminster School between 1806 and 1808 were published in 1809 as Paganism and Christianity Compared, with a second edition in 1825; his later lectures to the school were not published. On political and religious topics, his works included Vindicae regiae, or, A Defence of the Kingly Office (1797); Letters of Fabius (1801), opposing repeal of the Test Act in relation to Irish Roman Catholics; and The Claims of the Establishment (1807), a sermon on the levels of tolerance and civil rights to be afforded to those who departed from traditional Anglican doctrines. In 1801, he published anonymously Nuptiae sacrae, or, An Enquiry into the Scriptural Doctrine of Marriage and Divorce, at a time when William Eden, 1st Baron Auckland, was proposing to make it illegal for those who were divorced on the grounds of adultery from marrying their partner in adultery. Ireland proved in the Quarterly Review in 1823 that an 1821 pamphlet was a plagiarised version of his earlier work, which was re-issued in 1830. After two lectures on plagues, addressed to the Royal College of Physicians and published in 1832 and 1834, Ireland did not publish further.

== Reputation ==
One historian of the abbey has said that Ireland was "essentially an eighteenth-century clergyman who lived long enough to feel the winds of change blowing around him". He has been criticised for failing to act to protect the position of Westminster School (which was in decline in this period) by increasing its funding from the abbey, although this would have meant reduced incomes for the abbey clergy and may not have been agreed. He had a conservative attitude to political and religious affairs, shown in his writings. He was a friend from schooldays of William Gifford, the satirist and first editor of the Quarterly Review; both assisted the other with their writings. Gifford described Ireland as "my delight in youth, my pride and consolation in age", and tried to persuade George Canning (Foreign Secretary, and founder of the Review) to appoint Ireland as a bishop.

== Illness and death ==
Ireland died in the Deanery at Westminster on 2 September 1842, shortly before his 81st birthday, having been in poor health since 1838. He was buried in Westminster Abbey on 8 September, alongside William Gifford, whose burial Ireland had arranged as executor of his will. A bust by the English sculptor John Ternouth was later erected. Ireland outlived his wife Susannah, who had died in 1826 at the rectory in Islip when she was 71 years old; there were no children of the marriage.
