= William Vincent (priest) =

English scholar and Dean of Westminster (1739–1815)

The Very Reverend William Vincent
- Dean of Westminster
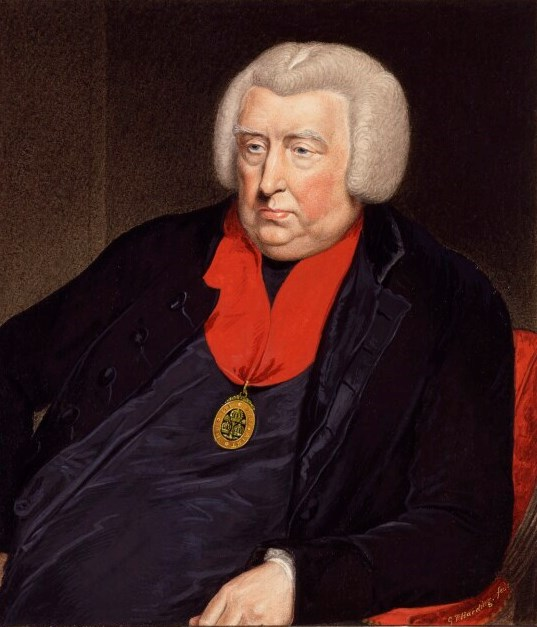
- Church: Church of England
- In office: 1802–1815
- Predecessor: Samuel Horsley
- Successor: John Ireland

Personal details
- Born: 2 November 1739 Limehouse Street Ward, London
- Died: 21 December 1815 (aged 76) Islip, Oxfordshire
- Denomination: Anglicanism
- Education: Westminster School
- Alma mater: Trinity College, Cambridge

William Vincent (2 November 1739 – 21 December 1815) was Dean of Westminster from 1802 to 1815.

== Biography ==
Vincent born on 2 November 1739 in Limehouse Street Ward, London, was the fifth surviving son of Giles Vincent, packer and Portugal merchant, by Sarah (Holloway).

=== Theological career ===
William was admitted at Westminster School as a 'town boy' in 1747; he became a king's scholar in 1753, and in 1757 was elected to Trinity College, Cambridge. After graduating as BA in 1761, he returned to Westminster as usher. He became second master in June 1771, and in the same year was made chaplain in ordinary to the king. He graduated MA in 1764 and DD in 1776, and two years later received the vicarage of Longdon, Wiltshire, which, however, he exchanged within six months for the rectory of All Hallows, Thames Street. In 1784 he became sub-almoner to the king. He shared the tory views of his family, and in 1780 published anonymously a Letter in reply to a sermon preached at Cambridge by Richard Watson. A sermon preached by him in 1792 at St. Margaret's, Westminster, for the benefit of the greycoat charity, attracted attention, and when reprinted in the following year by the Patriotic Association against republicans and levellers, twenty thousand copies were sold.

=== Headmaster of Westminster School ===
Meanwhile, in 1788, Vincent had been appointed headmaster of Westminster. He held the position for fourteen years, respected alike for both scholarship and character. His swinging pace, sonorous quotations, and especially his loud call of "Eloquere, puer, eloquere" ("Speak out, boy!") dwelt long in the memory of his scholars. His name is perpetuated by his enclosure of part of the nearby Tothill Fields for his old school as a playground, called Vincent Square after him. As the waste marshlands of the Tuttle or Tothill Fields were beginning to be built over, Vincent simply employed a man with a horse to plough a ditch around an area of some eleven acres; his receipt for the fee is in the Abbey archives.

In his adherence to corporal punishment he resembled his predecessor, Richard Busby; and in 1792 he expelled Robert Southey for his contributions to an anti-flogging periodical, The Flagellant. The attention he paid to his pupils' religious education rendered him well qualified to answer the attacks of Thomas Rennell, master of the Temple, and Thomas Lewis O'Beirne, bishop of Meath, who had charged headmasters with neglecting this branch of their duties. Vincent's Defence of Public Education, issued as a reply to the latter in 1801, reached a third edition two years later, and occasioned some controversy. In April 1801 he was nominated by William Pitt, the Prime Minister, to a canonry of Westminster. When in the following year Pitt's successor, Henry Addington, offered him the deanery of Westminster "as a public reward for public services", this was understood to refer to his recent publication. He was presented as dean on 3 August 1802, becoming the first dean since the late 17th century not to have held the office in conjunction with that of Bishop of Rochester.

In 1805 Vincent obtained the rectory of St John's, Westminster, and resigned that of All Hallows to his son. In 1807 he exchanged St John's for the rectory of Islip, Oxfordshire, where he made his country residence. He had been appointed president of Sion College in 1798, and acted as prolocutor of the lower house of convocation in 1802, 1806, and 1807.

The fire which broke out in the roof of the lantern of Westminster Abbey on 9 July 1803 necessitated repairs to the fabric. They were all paid for by the dean and chapter; but in 1805 Vincent addressed a letter to Pitt praying for a national grant for the restoration of the Henry VII Chapel. Fourteen annual grants, beginning from 1807, were received, and the work proceeded under the direction of Thomas Gayfere and Benjamin Wyatt. The restoration was not completed till 1822. The manner in which it was carried out, especially the interference with the tomb of Thomas of Woodstock, Duke of Gloucester, to make way for the new Addison monument, was severely criticised in the Gentleman's Magazine by John Carter, the architect. Vincent replied by the jeux d'esprit Woodstock's Ghost and Addison's Ghost, satirical verses directed against Carter and William Capon, the scene-painter. He also directed the restoration of the great rose or marigold window; and caused the enormous monuments of Captains Harvey, Hutt, and Montagu (killed in Admiral Howe's victory of the "Glorious First of June" 1794) to be removed from between the pillars of the nave to their present positions. Pitt and Charles James Fox were buried in the abbey in 1806, and the Duc de Montpensier (brother of Louis-Philippe) in the Henry VII Chapel in the following year. Minute accounts of the repairs executed at the abbey and of the chapter business while he was dean are given in a manuscript notebook of Vincent's, which is still preserved at the deanery. The book also contains an account by him of the 16th and 17th-century chapter-books, and an analysis and criticism of Flete's manuscript Chronicle of the Abbey.

=== Classical scholar ===
Vincent made his reputation as a classical scholar by the publication of a Latin treatise entitled De Legione Manlianâ Quæstio ex Livio desumta, et rei militaris Romanæ studiosis proposita. In this, by means of an ingenious emendation, he reconciled the apparently conflicting statements of Livy and Polybius respecting the legion. Porson and Heyne gave a general assent to his views. Only four copies of the work are said to have been sold. In the next year Vincent published The Origination of the Greek Verb: an Hypothesis, followed in 1795 by The Greek Verb Analysed: an Hypothesis in which the Source and Structure of the Greek Language in general is considered. He found the reasons for the inflections of the verbs in their derivations from "a simple and very short original verb signifying to do or exist", which being afterwards subjoined to radicals, denoting various actions and modes of being, formed their tenses, modes, and other variations. Vincent had to defend his work against the charges of insufficient research and plagiarism (from a writer in the ‘Encyclopædia Britannica'), advanced in the Hermes Unmasked of Thomas Gunter Browne. His views did not succeed in holding their ground.

=== Geographer ===
But ancient geography was the subject which Vincent made his chief study. In 1797 he issued his commentary on Arrian's Voyage of Nearchus (contained in the Indica), which he terms 'the first event of general importance to mankind in the history of navigation'. Friedrich Schmieder, a later editor of Arrian, translated Vincent's arguments into Latin and subjoined them as a complete answer to the objections of Dodwell. Vincent had the assistance of Alexander Dalrymple, hydrographer to the admiralty, who prepared charts, and of Samuel Horsley, then dean of Westminster, who furnished two astronomical dissertations. The subject was pursued in The Periplus of the Erythræan Sea, which appeared in two parts in 1800 and 1805. These three commentaries, which occupied Vincent's leisure during eight years, were dedicated to George III. The Commerce and Navigation of the Ancients in the Indian Ocean, 2 vols., issued in 1807, forms a second edition of the whole work. It was dedicated to Lord Sidmouth. It contains contributions by Professor Heyne, Dr. Schneider, and Niebuhr, as well as by Sir Gore Ouseley, Dr. Burney, and William Wales. McCulloch termed it a most valuable contribution to the geography of antiquity and the history of commerce. An English translation of the Voyage of Nearchus and of the Periplus was published separately by Vincent in 1809.

Gleanings from the Asiatick Researches of the learned Dr. Vincent, was privately printed in 1813 by Joseph Thomas Brown. Vincent also contributed notes to Gibbon's Inquiry into the Circumnavigation of Africa, and to the Classical Journal articles on Ancient Commerce, China as known to Classic Authors, The Geography of Susiana, and Theophilus an African Bishop. For the first series of the British Critic, conducted by his friend Nares, he wrote several important reviews, and, in connection with the Troad controversy, attacked the views of Jacob Bryant, whom he charged with falsifying passages in Diodorus Siculus. Vincent was also a frequent contributor to The Gentleman's Magazine.

=== Personal life ===
In 1771, William Vincent married Hannah Wyatt. They had two sons, William St Andrew Vincent (1772–1849), thereafter Rector of Bolney and prebendary of Chichester; and George Giles Vincent (1774–1859), who became a solicitor, writer of philosophy, and served Westminster Abbey as Chapter Clerk for 50 years.

William St Andrew, after the Dean's death, published a book of his sermons, "Sermons on Faith, Doctrines and Public Duties," in 1817, followed by a second volume in 1836.

George Giles Vincent paid tribute to him as "one of the best of parents, and best of men... In practice, he was most conscientious in performance of his clerical duties, but he despised both the parade and the affectation of piety."

== Death and appreciation ==
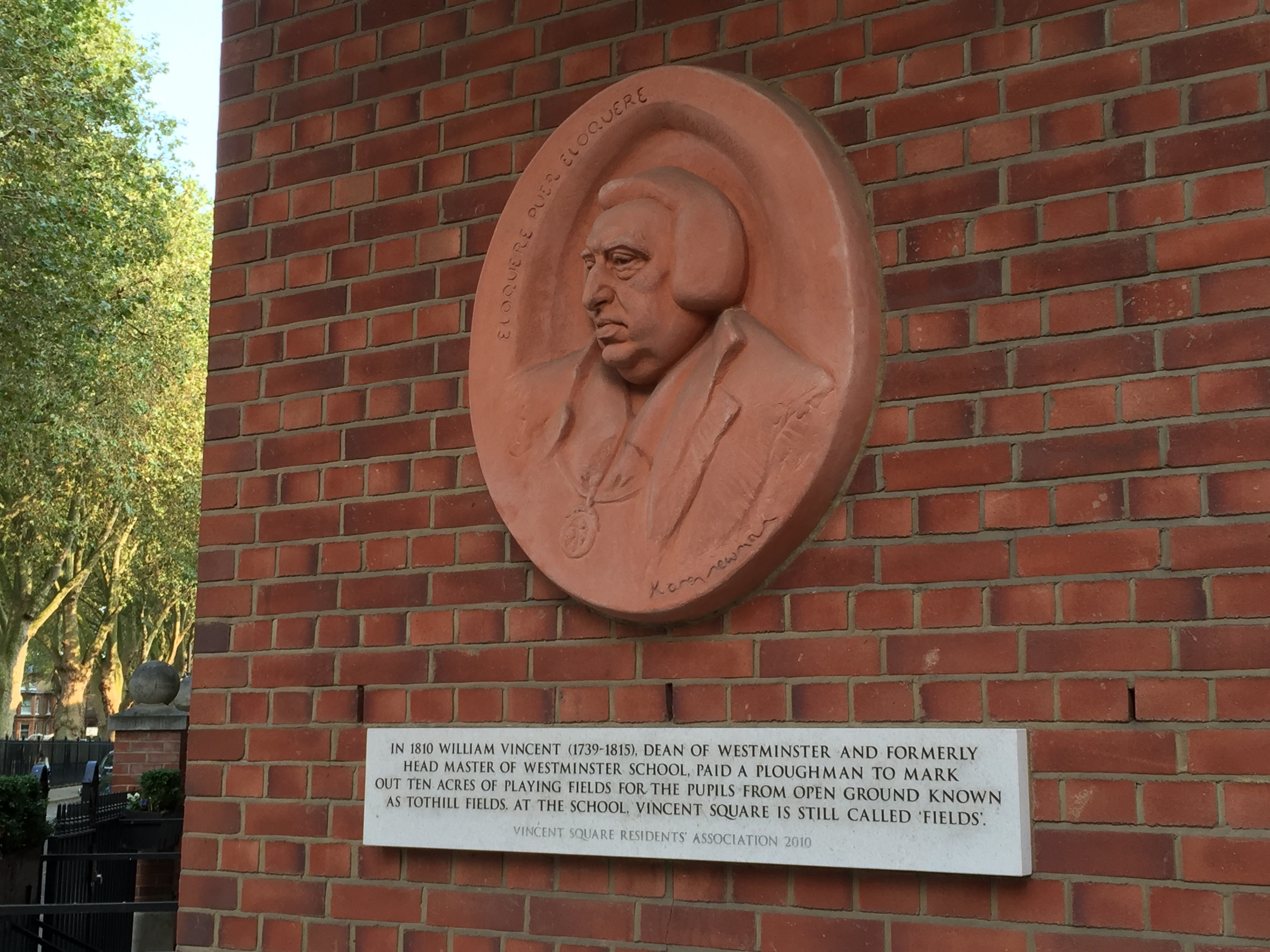
Terracotta plaque of William Vincent installed in Vincent Square in 2010

Vincent died at Islip on 21 December 1815, and was buried in St Benedict's Chapel, Westminster Abbey, on 29 December 1815. His monument, between those of South and Busby, bears a Latin inscription composed by himself. In 1771 he married Hannah, fourth daughter of George Wyatt, chief clerk of the vote office, House of Commons. She died on 17 February 1807, leaving children. There is a mural tablet to her with an inscription by her husband in the north transept of the abbey.

William Beloe thought Vincent one of the soundest scholars in Europe, an opinion corroborated by Thomas James Mathias in Pursuits of Literature (third dialogue). The dramatist Richard Cumberland also speaks of him in high terms in his Memoirs. The poet William Cowper made an English translation of some Latin verses written by Vincent, when second master at Westminster, on his predecessor Pierson Lloyd. A French version of Vincent's great work on ancient navigation was made under the sanction of Napoleon by M. Billecoq; and in Germany, where his works were well known, his scholarship was recognised by a degree from Göttingen in 1814. "Next to Rennell, and beyond him in some respects," says Sir Clements Markham, "Vincent was the greatest comparative geographer of his time."

== See also ==
- Dean of Westminster
