= George Kilpatrick =

Canadian clergyman (1910-1989)

- Born: 15 September 1910; Coal Creek
- Died: 14 January 1989 (aged 78)
- Education: Doctor of Divinity
- Alma mater: University of Oxford
- Occupation: Theologian, university teacher
- Position held: Dean Ireland's Professor of the Exegesis of Holy Scripture (University of Oxford, 1949–1977)

George Dunbar Kilpatrick (15 September 1910 – 14 January 1989) was an Anglican priest and theologian. He was Dean Ireland's Professor of the Exegesis of Holy Scripture at the University of Oxford from 1949 to 1977.

== Life ==
Kilpatrick was born in Coal Creek, British Columbia, Canada.

=== Education ===
He studied at University College, London (obtaining a first-class degree in classics in 1932) and Oriel College, Oxford (obtaining a second-class degree in Literae Humaniores (classics) in 1934 and a second-class degree in theology in 1936, as well as a Bachelor of Divinity degree in 1944). In 1948 he obtained his Doctor of Divinity degree.

=== Academic work ===
He was ordained deacon in 1936 and priest in 1937, serving as a curate in Horsell, Surrey, and in Selly Oak, Birmingham.

After tutoring at Queen's College, Edgbaston, and serving as Acting Warden of the College of the Ascension, Selly Oak, Kilpatrick became rector of Wishaw, Warwickshire, and a lecturer at Lichfield Theological College in 1942. He became head of the Department of Theology and Reader in Christian Theology at University College Nottingham in 1946. He was Grinfield Lecturer on the Septuagint at the University of Oxford from 1945 to 1949, and obtained his DDiv degree in 1948. He was appointed Dean Ireland's Professor of the Exegesis of Holy Scripture in 1949, a position that carried with it a Fellowship at The Queen's College, Oxford. He held the professorship and fellowship until 1977. He was appointed a Fellow of University College, London in 1967.

He has been described as "one of the outstanding textual critics of the twentieth century". His publications included The Origins of the Gospel according to St Matthew (1946), The Trial of Jesus (1953) and The Eucharist in Bible and Liturgy (1984), as well as various articles in journals and periodicals. He died on 14 January 1989.

== Sources ==
- Elliott, James Keith (1 June 1976). "George Dunbar Kilpatrick". Studies in New Testament Language and Text. Essays in Honour of George D. Kilpatrick on the Occasion of his Sixty-Fifth Birthday. Novum Testamentum, Supplements. Vol. 44. pp. 1–3. doi:10.1163/9789004266551_002. ISBN 978-90-04-04386-2.
