= Examination of conscience =

Concept in Catholic theology

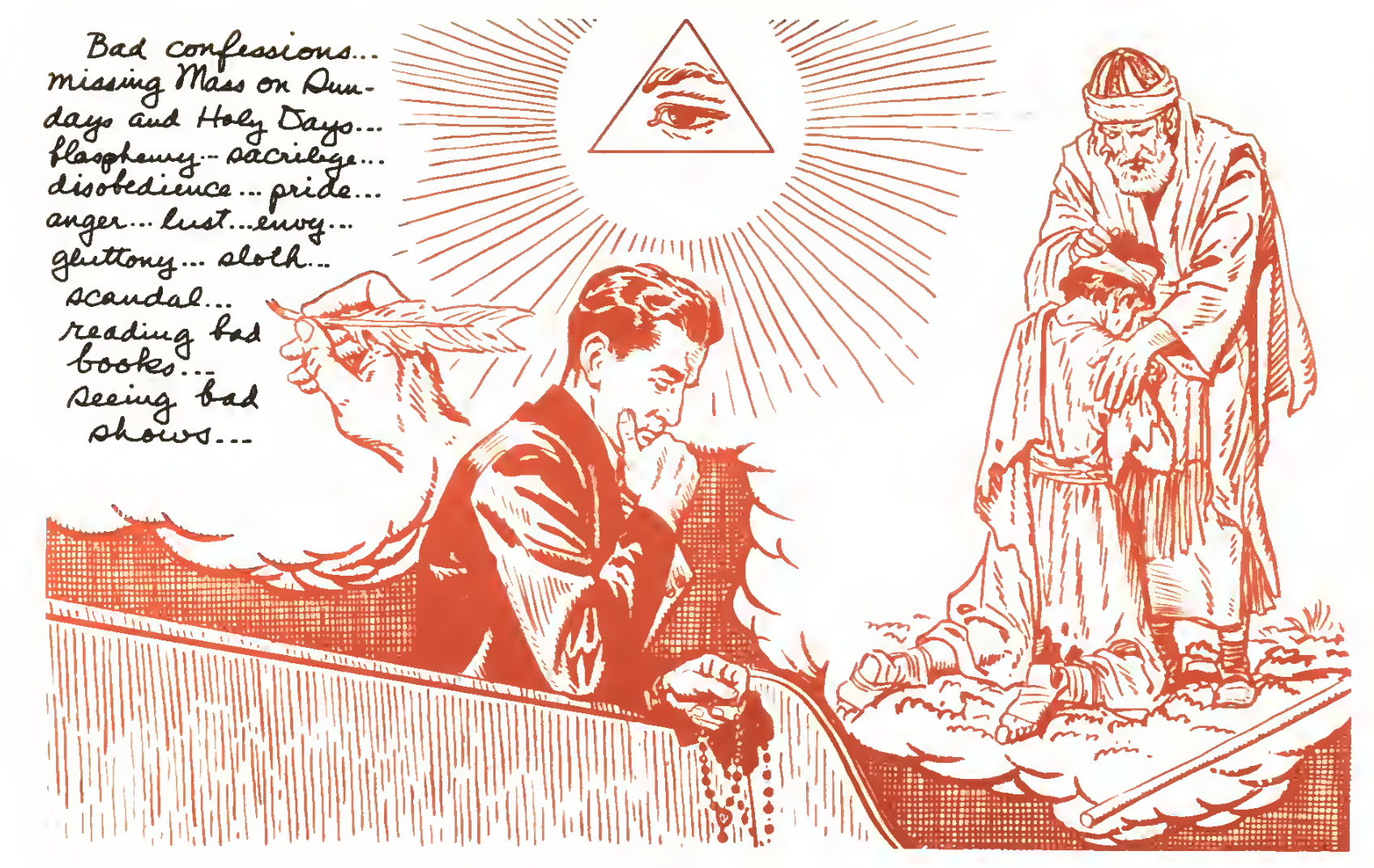
A man making an examination of conscience mentally lists his sins.

Examination of conscience is a review of one's past thoughts, words, actions, and omissions for the purpose of ascertaining their conformity with, or deviation from, the moral law. Among Christians, this is generally a private review; secular intellectuals have, on occasion, published autocritiques for public consumption. In the Catholic Church, penitents who wish to receive the sacrament of penance are encouraged to examine their conscience using the Ten Commandments as a guide, or the Beatitudes, or the virtues and vices. The doctrine of examination of conscience is taught in Lutheran Churches, where penitents who wish to receive Holy Absolution are asked to use the Ten Commandments as a guide before confessing their sins to the priest (pastor).

"The excellence of this practice and its fruitfulness for Christian virtue," preached Pope Pius X, "are clearly established by the teaching of the great masters of the spiritual life." St. Ignatius of Loyola considered the examination of conscience as the single most important spiritual exercise. In his Spiritual Exercises he presents different forms of it in the particular and general examination (24-43). Of the general examination he writes; "The first point is to give thanks to God our Lord for the favors received" (43). This point has become a highly developed part of Ignatian spirituality in modern times, and has led to many more positive practices, generally called examen of consciousness. In twice-daily "examens" one might review the ways God has been present through one to others, and to oneself through others, and how one has responded, and to proceed with one's day with gratitude, more aware of the presence of God in one's life.

In general, there is a distinction between the particular examen, which aims to change one particular feature or defect in one's behavior, the examen of consciousness, which is a more nuanced reflection, and the general examination of conscience as used before the sacrament of penance.” This last method is called examination of conscience because it is a review of one’s actions from a moral point of view, reflecting upon one’s responsibility and looking at one’s sins and weaknesses in preparation for repentance, in contrast with the examen of consciousness which does not focus on morality even if sins will emerge during the review of the day.

== Christianity ==
Examination of conscience was commanded by the Apostle St. Paul to be performed by the faithful each time they received Holy Communion: "But let a man examine himself, and so let him eat of that bread, and drink of that cup. For he that eateth and drinketh unworthily, eateth and drinketh damnation to himself.... For if we would judge ourselves, we should not be judged." (1 Corinthians 11:28–31, KJV). And, as the early Christians received Holy Communion very frequently, examination of conscience became a familiar exercise of their spiritual lives. In many cases, this became a daily practice of the lives of early members of the clergy and those living a monastic life, such as the hermit St. Anthony, who was said to have examined his conscience every night, while St. Basil of Caesarea, St. Augustine of Hippo, St. Bernard of Clairvaux, and founders of religious orders generally made the examination of conscience a regular daily exercise of their followers. Lay members of congregations were encouraged to take up the practice as a salutary measure to advance in virtue. St. Bernard had taught: "As a searching investigator of the integrity of your own conduct, submit your life to a daily examination. Consider carefully what progress you have made or what ground you have lost. Strive to know yourself. Place all your faults before your eyes. Come face to face with yourself, as though you were another person, and then weep for your faults."

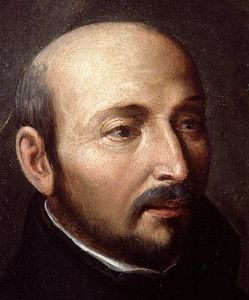
Ignatius Loyola described a five-point system of examining conscience

St. Ignatius of Loyola described a five-point devotional examination method in his 1524 work Spiritual Exercises. In the first point, followers thank God for the benefits received; in the second, they ask grace to know and correct their faults; in the third, they pass in review the successive hours of the day, noting what faults they have committed in deed, word, thought, or omission; in the fourth, they ask God's pardon; in the fifth, they consider amendment.

The devotional examination of conscience is distinct from that required as a proximate preparation for the Sacrament of Reconciliation which is intended specifically to identify all sins requiring repentance. Various more elaborate methods might be used in the examination for confession, using the Ten Commandments of God, the Commandments of the Church, the Seven Capital Sins, the duties of one's state of life, the nine ways of partaking in the sin of others.

The Lutheran Small Catechism, on the examination of conscience, implores penitents to reflect on the following prior to receiving the sacrament of confession and absolution:

Consider your place in life according to the Ten Commandments: Are you a father, mother, son, daughter, husband, wife, or worker? Have you been disobedient, unfaithful, or lazy? Have you been hot-tempered, rude, or quarrelsome? Have you hurt someone by your words or deeds? Have you stolen, been negligent, wasted anything, or done any harm?

== Autocritique ==
Among secular intellectuals, particularly Marxists, the term autocritique, borrowed from French, is used. This is particularly applied to a public "methodological attempt to step away from themselves through a process of self-objectification," and was popular in France following the Algerian War. Edgar Morin's questioning of his own motives as a defender of Algeria popularised the term; other well-known examples include Jawaharlal Nehru's anonymous dissection of his own personality and drive in the Modern Review.

== See also ==
- Scrupulosity
