= Dean Ireland's Professor of the Exegesis of Holy Scripture =

Professorship at the University of Oxford

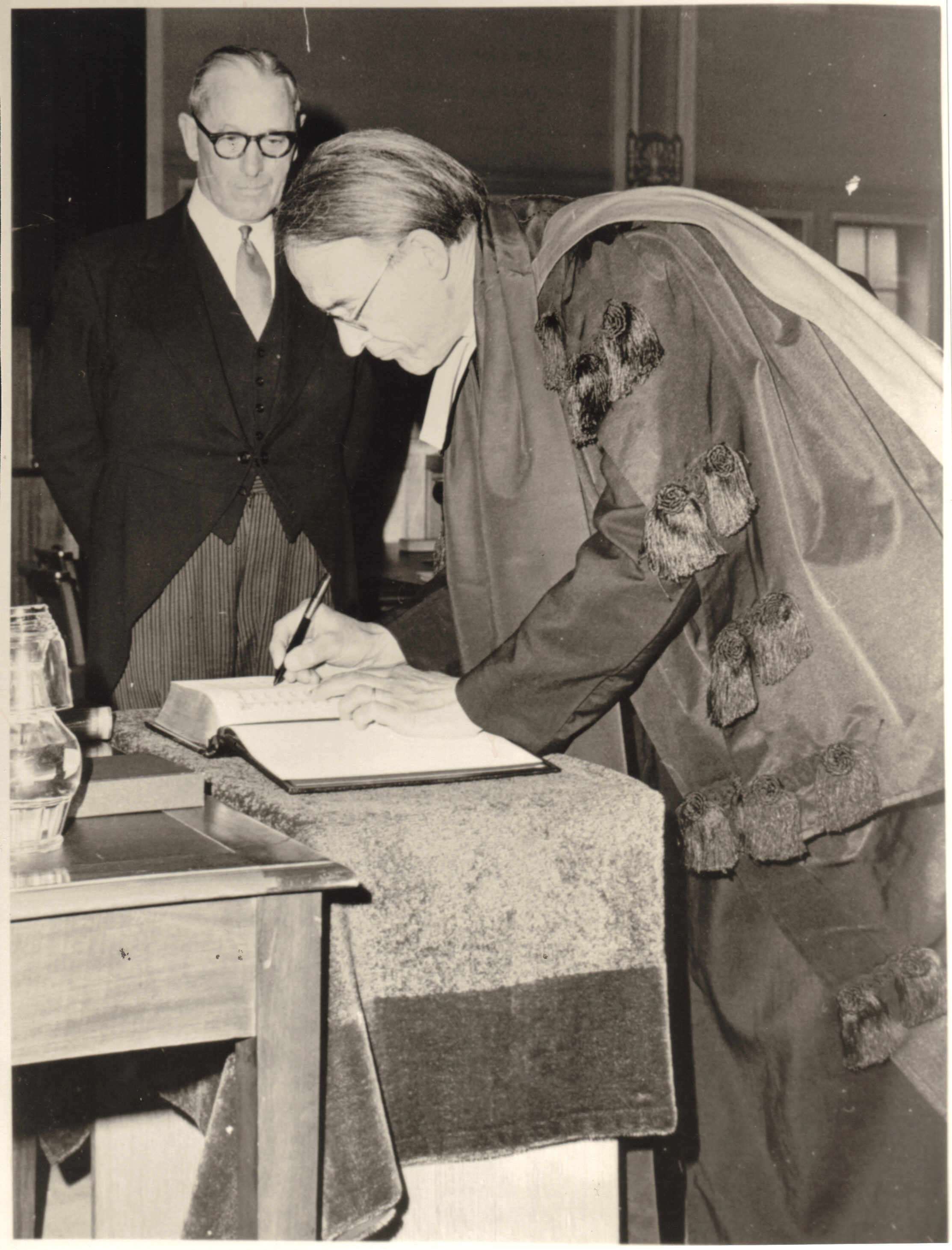
G. B. Caird, who held the position from 1977 to 1984

The position of Dean Ireland's Professor of the Exegesis of Holy Scripture was established at the University of Oxford in 1847. This professorship in the critical interpretation or explanation of biblical texts, a field known as exegesis, was instituted by John Ireland, who was Dean of Westminster from 1816 until his death in 1842. He founded scholarships in his lifetime at the University of Oxford, which are still awarded after an examination to undergraduates "for the promotion of classical learning and taste". In his will, he left £10,000 to the university (equivalent to £1,400,000 in 2024), with the interest arising to be applied to the professorship. The first professor, Edward Hawkins, was appointed in 1847. The second Dean Ireland's Professor, Robert Scott, had won an Ireland scholarship in 1833 while studying at Christ Church.

As of 2017, 13 men have held the position of Dean Ireland's Professor, with differing interests in scriptural exegesis (critical interpretation or explanation of biblical texts). Hawkins was elected on the strength of his reputation gained opposing the Oxford Movement (a group within the Church of England, sometimes called "Tractarians", who aimed to reform the church by reasserting its links with the early Catholic church). In contrast, the third professor, Henry Liddon (elected nine years after Hawkins resigned), was a prominent member of the Oxford Movement.

Between 1932 and 2014, the holder of the chair held a fellowship at The Queen's College. As of 2017, Markus Bockmuehl is the current professor, having been appointed in 2014; he is a professorial fellow of Keble College.

== Professors ==
Details about the professors
Name	Years	Education (Note: At the University of Oxford, unless otherwise indicated)	College as Professor	Notes
Edward Hawkins	1847–61	St John's College	Oriel College	Hawkins, a Fellow of Oriel since 1813, was ordained in 1816 and quickly became a prominent theologian. Appointed Provost of Oriel in 1828, he was a leading opponent of the Oxford Movement; his theologian reputation led to his election as the first Dean Ireland Professor. One biographer said of Hawkins that he "threw himself into the office with conscientious earnestness, and discharged its duties with exemplary fidelity".
Robert Scott	1861–70	Christ Church	Balliol College	Scott was awarded an Ireland Scholarship in 1833 and became a Fellow of Balliol in 1835, the year he was ordained. He was Dean Ireland Professor in addition to being Master of Balliol (elected 1854), leaving Oxford in 1870 to become Dean of Rochester.
Henry Liddon	1870–82	Christ Church	Christ Church	Liddon, a supporter of the Oxford Movement from his student days, was vice-principal of Cuddesdon theological college, and then vice-principal of St Edmund Hall, where his New Testament lectures were well-attended. His 1866 Bampton Lectures were highly regarded for their theological content and scholarship. He was appointed Dean Ireland Professor in the same year as he became a canon of St Paul's Cathedral, London, where his preaching was popular; he published fourteen volumes of sermons, and became the most prominent member of the Oxford Movement as his friend and mentor Edward Bouverie Pusey became less active in his old age.
William Sanday	1882–95	Balliol College and Corpus Christi College	Exeter College	After his ordination, Sanday became a parish priest and then spent six years as principal of Bishop Hatfield Hall at the University of Durham before returning to Oxford. He was Lady Margaret Professor of Divinity from 1895 to 1919. His theological focus was on the study of the New Testament, particularly the four gospels, using close textual analysis.
Walter Lock	1895–1919	Corpus Christi College	Keble College	Lock, another follower of the Oxford Movement, was one of the first Tutors at Keble College on its foundation in 1870, becoming Sub-Warden in 1881 and Warden in 1897; he wrote a biography of John Keble in 1893. He resigned the professorship in 1919 on his appointment as Lady Margaret Professor of Divinity. He was an advocate for university education for women, and pressed (successfully) for Oxford's Bachelor of Divinity and Doctor of Divinity degrees to be available to students who were not members of the Church of England. He was a respected preacher and teacher, and had friends from a great variety of theological backgrounds. His "sometimes over-cautious" scholarship has been said to have been best demonstrated in Critical and Exegetical Commentary on the Pastoral Epistles (1924).
Cuthbert Turner	1920–30	New College	Magdalen College	Turner's main research interest was textual criticism, particularly material and manuscripts relating to the canon law of the early church. His work broadened his interest into New Testament studies (particularly the Gospel of Mark) and he never wrote a large-scale church history as he had planned. His inaugural lecture, published as The Study of the New Testament, 1883 and 1920, discussed the position of an earlier Dean Ireland Professor, William Sanday, in the history of biblical scholarship.
B. H. Streeter	1932–33	The Queen's College	The Queen's College	Streeter has been described as "one of the most distinguished New Testament scholars of his day", although another view is that his work was "of immense biblical and patristic learning but of rather little sustained theological skill". He had a sustained interest in the philosophy of religion, writing and speaking on the topic. His tenure of the chair was brief, as he became Provost of The Queen's College in 1933.
Robert Lightfoot	1934–49	Worcester College	The Queen's College	Lightfoot served as principal of Wells Theological College before returning to Oxford, first as chaplain of Lincoln College and then as a tutor in theology at New College. He concentrated his work on the four gospels, particularly the Gospel of Mark. After becoming Dean Ireland Professor, he was described as "zealous in promoting Biblical research" at Oxford, but published little as he was "a hesitant writer with an unfeigned horror of inaccuracy".
George Kilpatrick	1949–77	University College, London and Oriel College, Oxford	The Queen's College	Kilpatrick lectured at theological colleges and at University College Nottingham before his appointment to the chair. He has been described as "one of the outstanding textual critics of the twentieth century." According to one commentator, he "pioneered the eclectic method in New Testament textual criticism", and his "special emphasis on the style of the New Testament writers ... and his study of the influence of Atticism on the early transmission of the New Testament have made a vital contribution to our understanding of the text."
George Caird	1977–84	University of Cambridge (Peterhouse); Mansfield College, Oxford	The Queen's College	Caird trained as a Congregationalist minister at Mansfield College before teaching in Canada, where he was the first professor of New Testament at McGill University, Montreal. He returned to Mansfield College as tutor in theology in 1959, becoming principal in 1970. He was an influential and respected scholar and lecturer, with a "somewhat conservative theological position" and an appreciation of the use of language and literary styles in biblical texts.
E. P. Sanders	1984–89	Texas Wesleyan University, Southern Methodist University, and Union Theological Seminary, New York	The Queen's College	Sanders taught at McMaster University in Ontario, Canada, from 1966 until 1984. After leaving Oxford, he was Arts and Sciences Professor of Religion at Duke University in North Carolina, USA, from 1990 to 2005. Interested particularly in Christianity and Judaism in the Greek and Roman world, he has been a visiting professor at the Jewish Theological Seminary of America and a professor of Judeo-Christian Studies at Tulane University in Louisiana, USA. His works include Paul and Palestinian Judaism and Jesus and Judaism, both of which won book awards.
Christopher Rowland	1991–2014	University of Cambridge (Christ's College) and Ridley Hall, Cambridge	The Queen's College	Rowland lectured at Newcastle University for five years and was a curate at churches in the Newcastle area. He returned to Cambridge in 1979 as a lecturer in divinity and a Fellow of Jesus College, Cambridge. He has been Canon Theologian of Liverpool Cathedral since 2005. His academic works include consideration of biblical interpretation in liberation theology in Latin America, the biblical interpretation of William Blake, and the Book of Revelation.
Markus Bockmuehl	2014 onwards	University of British Columbia, Regent College, and the University of Cambridge	Keble College	Bockmuehl was previously Professor of Biblical and Early Christian Studies at Oxford, after professorial positions at Cambridge and at the University of St Andrews.

== See also ==
Other professorships in Oxford University's Faculty of Theology:

- Lady Margaret Professor of Divinity
- Oriel Professor of the Interpretation of Holy Scripture
- Regius Professor of Divinity
- Regius Professor of Ecclesiastical History
- Regius Professor of Moral and Pastoral Theology
