= Precepts of the Church =

Laws considered binding on the Catholic faithful

In the Catholic Church, the Precepts of the Church, sometimes called the Commandments of the Church, are certain laws considered binding on the faithful. As usually understood, they are moral and ecclesiastical, broad in character and limited in number. In modern times there are five.

== Modern period ==
=== Catechism of the Catholic Church ===
The Catechism of the Catholic Church promulgates the following:

1. You shall attend Mass on Sundays and on holy days of obligation and rest from servile labor
2. You shall confess your sins at least once a year
3. You shall receive the sacrament of the Eucharist at least during the Easter season
4. You shall observe the days of fasting and abstinence established by the Church
5. You shall help to provide for the needs of the Church

=== Compendium of the Catechism of the Catholic Church ===
The Compendium of the Catechism of the Catholic Church, §. 432, enumerates the same five:

1. to attend Mass on Sundays and other holy days of obligation and to refrain from work and activities which could impede the sanctification of those days;
2. to confess one's sins, receiving the sacrament of Reconciliation at least once each year;
3. to receive the sacrament of the Eucharist at least during the Easter season;
4. to abstain from eating meat and to observe the days of fasting established by the Church.
5. to help to provide for the material needs of the Church, each according to his own ability.

Previously, there was a sixth: "Not to marry persons within the forbidden degrees of kindred or otherwise prohibited by the Church; nor to solemnize marriage at the forbidden times".

== Nature of these commandments ==
The authority to enact laws obligatory on all the faithful belongs to the Catholic Church by the very nature of her constitution, says the Catholic Encyclopedia. The Church considers itself the appointed public organ and interpreter of God's revelation for all time, and that to effectively discharge this office, it must be empowered to give its laws the gravest sanction. These laws, when universally binding, have for their object:

- the definition or explanation of some doctrine, either by way of positive pronouncement or by the condemnation of opposing error;
- the prescription of the time and manner in which a divine law, more or less general and indeterminate, is to be observed, e.g. the precept obliging the faithful to receive the Holy Eucharist during the paschal season and to confess their sins annually;
- the defining of the sense of the moral law in its application to difficult cases of conscience, e.g. many of the decisions of the Roman Congregations;
- some matter of mere discipline serving to safeguard the observance of the higher law, e.g. the Commandments to contribute to the support of one's pastors.

All these laws when binding on the faithful universally are truly commandments of the Catholic Church. In the technical sense, however, the table of these Commandments does not contain doctrinal pronouncements. Such an inclusion would render it too complex. The Commandments of the Church (in this restricted sense) are moral and ecclesiastical, and as a particular code of precepts are necessarily broad in character and limited in number.

== History ==
As early as the time of Constantine I, especial insistence was put upon the obligation to hear Mass on Sundays and Holy Days, to receive the sacraments and to abstain from contracting marriage at certain seasons. In the seventh-century Penitentiary of Theodore of Canterbury we find penalties imposed on those who contemn the Sunday.

According to a work written by Regino, the abbot of Prüm (d. 915), entitled Libri duo de synodalibus causis et disciplinis, the bishop should ask in his visitation:

"if anyone has not kept the fast of Lent, or of the ember-days, or of the rogations, or that which may have been appointed by the bishop for the staying of any plague; if there be any one who has not gone to Holy Communion three time in the year, that is at Easter, Pentecost and Christmas; if there be any one who has withheld tithes from God and His saints; if there be anyone so perverse and so alienated from God as not to come to Church at least on Sundays; if there be anyone who has not gone to confession once in the year, that is at the beginning of Lent, and has not done penance for his sins."

The precepts here implied came to be regarded as special Commandments of the Church. Thus, in a book of tracts of the thirteenth century attributed to Pope Celestine V (though the authenticity of this work has been denied) a separate tractate is given to the precepts of the Church and is divided into four chapters, the first of which treats of fasting, the second of confession and paschal Communion, the third of interdicts on marriage, and the fourth of tithes.

In the fourteenth century Ernest von Parduvitz, Archbishop of Prague, instructed his priests to explain in popular sermons the principal points of the catechism, the Our Father, the Creed, the Commandments of God and of the Church (Hafner, loc. cit., 115). A century later (1470) the catechism of Dietrick Coelde, the first, it is said, to be written in German, explicitly set forth that there were five Commandments of the Church.

In his Summa Theologica (part I, tit. xvii, p. 12) Antoninus of Florence (1439) enumerates ten precepts of the Church universally binding on the faithful. These are:

- to observe certain feasts
- to keep the prescribed fasts
- to attend Mass on Sundays and Holy Days
- to confess once a year
- to receive Holy Communion during paschal time
- to pay tithes
- to abstain from any act upon which an interdict has been placed entailing excommunication
- to refrain also from any act interdicted under pain of excommunication latæ sententiæ
- to avoid association with the excommunicated
- finally, not to attend Mass or other religious functions celebrated by a priest living in open concubinage.

In the sixteenth century, Martin Aspilcueta (1586), gives a list of four principal precepts of obligation:

- to fast at certain prescribed times
- to pay tithes
- to go to confession once a year
- and to receive Holy Communion at Easter.

At this time there began to appear many popular works in defence of the authority of the Church and setting forth her precepts. Such among others were the Summa Doctrinæ Christianæ (1555) of Peter Canisius, and the Doctrina Christiana of Bellarmine (1589).

== See also ==
- Ten Commandments in Catholic theology
