= Michael J. Gorman =

American New Testament scholar (born 1955)

- Born: November 3, 1955 (age 71)

Academic background
- Education: Gordon College; Princeton Theological Seminary
- Thesis: The Self, the Lord, and the Other (1989)
- Academic advisor: Bruce M. Metzger

Academic work
- Discipline: Biblical studies; theology
- Sub-discipline: Biblical theology; New Testament studies
- Institutions: St. Mary's Seminary and University

Michael J. Gorman (born 1955) is an American New Testament scholar. He is the Raymond E. Brown Professor of Biblical Studies and Theology at St. Mary's Seminary and University, where he has taught since 1991. From 1995 to 2012 he was dean of St. Mary's Ecumenical Institute.

Gorman specializes in the letters, theology, and spirituality of the Apostle Paul. He is associated with the "participationist perspective" on Paul's theology. His additional specialties are the book of Revelation, theological and missional interpretation of Scripture, the gospel of John, and early Christian ethics. Gorman was born and raised in Anne Arundel County, Maryland, graduating from Glen Burnie High School in Glen Burnie, Maryland. He earned his Bachelor of Arts degree summa cum laude in French from Gordon College in Wenham, Massachusetts. He received the Master of Divinity and Doctor of Philosophy cum laude in New Testament from Princeton Theological Seminary, where he was also a teaching fellow in New Testament and an instructor in New Testament Greek. He has also been a visiting professor at Duke Divinity School, Regent College, Carey Baptist College (New Zealand), Wesley Theological Seminary, and two theological schools in Africa. Gorman has led several study trips to Greece/Turkey/Rome and to France/Switzerland. A United Methodist, Gorman is an active layperson and a popular teacher at colleges, seminaries, churches, and conferences representing many traditions. His older son, Rev. Dr. Mark Gorman, is a pastor and theologian who is also on the faculty of St. Mary's Ecumenical Institute.

Gorman is the author of twenty books and numerous articles on Biblical interpretation and on ethics.

== Selected works ==
=== Thesis ===
- Gorman, Michael J. (1989). The Self, the Lord, and the Other: the significance of reflexive pronoun constructions in the letters of Paul, with a comparison to the Discourses of Epictetus (Ph.D.). Princeton, NJ: Princeton Theological Seminary. OCLC 21186442.

=== Books ===
==== On Paul ====
- ——— (2001). Cruciformity: Paul's narrative spirituality of the cross. Grand Rapids, MI: Eerdmans. ISBN 9780802847959. OCLC 46503747.
- ——— (2004). Apostle of the Crucified Lord: a theological introduction to Paul and his letters. Grand Rapids, MI: Eerdmans. ISBN 9780802839343. OCLC 708565847.
- ——— (2008). Reading Paul. Cascade companions. Eugene, OR: Cascade Books. ISBN 9781556351952. OCLC 181087025.
- ——— (2009). Inhabiting the cruciform God : kenosis, justification, and theosis in Paul's narrative soteriology. Grand Rapids, MI: Eerdmans. ISBN 9780802862655. OCLC 262878951.
- ——— (2015). Peace in Paul and Luke. Grove Biblical series. Vol. B 76. Cambridge, UK: Grove Books Limited. ISBN 9781851749393. OCLC 922784054.
- ——— (2015). Becoming the Gospel: Paul, participation, and mission. The Gospel and Our Culture Series. Grand Rapids, MI: Eerdmans. ISBN 9780802868848. OCLC 971422877.
- ——— (2017). Apostle of the Crucified Lord: a theological introduction to Paul and his letters (2nd ed.). Grand Rapids, MI: Eerdmans. ISBN 9781467446945. OCLC 988869776.
- ——— (2018). Participation: Paul's vision of life in Christ. Grove Biblical series. Vol. 88. Cambridge, UK: Grove Books Limited. ISBN 9781788270502. OCLC 1046077371.
- ——— (2019). Participating in Christ: explorations in Paul's theology and spirituality. Grand Rapids, MI: Baker Academic. ISBN 9781540960368. OCLC 1039458688.
- ——— (2021). Cruciformity: Paul's Narrative Spirituality of the Cross (20th Anniversary ed.). Grand Rapids, MI: Eerdmans. ISBN 9780802879127. OCLC 1237694199.
- ——— (2022). Romans: A Theological and Pastoral Commentary. Grand Rapids, MI: Eerdmans. ISBN 9780802877628. OCLC 1256803242.
- ——— (2023). The Self, the Lord, and the Other according to Paul and Epictetus: The Theological Significance of Reflective Language. Eugene, OR: Cascade. ISBN 9781666795318. OCLC 1374880628.
- ——— (2025). 1 Corinthians: A Theological, Pastoral, and Missional Commentary. Grand Rapids, MI: Eerdmans. ISBN 978-0802882660. OCLC 1497262396.
- ——— (2026). Paul and John in Harmony: A Theological and Historical Exploration (Theological Explorations for the Church Catholic). Grand Rapids, MI: Baker Academic. ISBN 978-1540969897. OCLC 1523839225.
- ——— (2026). Life Transfigured: A Contemporary Pauline Theology. Grand Rapids, MI: Eerdmans. ISBN 978-0802885821. OCLC 1538592994.
- ——— (2027). Philippians: A Theological, Pastoral, and Missional Commentary. Grand Rapids, MI: Eerdmans. ISBN 978-0802885432.

==== Other Biblical and Theological Subjects ====
- ——— (1982). Abortion & the Early Church: Christian, Jewish & pagan attitudes in the Greco-Roman world. Downers Grove, IL: InterVarsity Press (reprinted by Wipf & Stock, 1998). ISBN 9780877843979. OCLC 8668589.
- ——— (2001). Elements of Biblical Exegesis: a basic guide for students and ministers. Peabody, MA: Hendrickson. ISBN 9781565634855. OCLC 809612129.
- ———; Brooks, Ann Loar (2003). Holy Abortion?: a theological critique of the Religious Coalition for Reproductive Choice: why Christians and Christian churches should reconsider the issue of abortion. Eugene, OR: Wipf and Stock. ISBN 9781592441853. OCLC 53188437.
- ——— (2005). Scripture: an ecumenical introduction to the Bible and its interpretation. Grand Rapids, MI: Baker Academic. ISBN 9781493403929. OCLC 912321059.
- ——— (2009). Elements of Biblical Exegesis: a basic guide for students and ministers (rev. & exp. ed.). Grand Rapids, MI: Baker Academic. ISBN 9780801046407. OCLC 942179305.
- ——— (2011). Reading Revelation Responsibly: uncivil worship and witness: following the Lamb into the new creation. Eugene, OR: Cascade Books. ISBN 9781606085608. OCLC 688509225.
- ——— (2014). The Death of the Messiah and the Birth of the New Covenant: the (not-so) new model of the atonement. Cambridge, UK: James Clarke. ISBN 9780227174913. OCLC 887856359.
- ——— (2017). Scripture and its Interpretation: a global, ecumenical introduction to the Bible. Grand Rapids, MI: Baker Academic. ISBN 9780801098390. OCLC 951762504.
- ——— (2018). Abide and Go: missional theosis in the Gospel of John. Didsbury lectures, 2016. Eugene, OR: Cascade Books. ISBN 9781532615450. OCLC 1037043088.

=== Chapters ===
- ——— (2011). "Abortion". In Green, Joel B.; Lapsley, Jacqueline E.; Miles, Rebekah; Verhey, Allen (eds.). The Dictionary of Scripture and Ethics. Grand Rapids, MI: Baker Academic. pp. 35–37. ISBN 9781784028015. OCLC 889717913.
- ——— (2011). "Cruciformity". In Green, Joel B.; Lapsley, Jacqueline E.; Miles, Rebekah; Verhey, Allen (eds.). The Dictionary of Scripture and Ethics. Grand Rapids, MI: Baker Academic. pp. 197–98. ISBN 9781784028015. OCLC 889717913.
- ——— (2014). "Shalom in the Book of Revelation: God, Church, Judgment, New Creation". In Brenneman, Laura L.; Schantz, Brad D. (eds.). Struggles for Shalom: Peace and Violence across the Testaments. Eugene, OR: Wipf and Stock. pp. 279–90. ISBN 9781498275255. OCLC 1088341375.
- ——— (2015). "The Work of Christ in the New Testament". In Murphy, Francesca Aran; Stefano, Troy A.; Anatolios, Khaled (eds.). The Oxford Handbook of Christology. Oxford: Oxford University Press. pp. 72–86. ISBN 9780198800644. OCLC 1005111746.
- ——— (2017). "John's Implicit Ethic of Enemy-Love". In Brown, Sherri; Skinner, Christopher W. (eds.). Johannine Ethics. Minneapolis: Fortress. pp. 171–94. ISBN 9781451496468. OCLC 1000582442.
- ——— (2018). "First Corinthians and the Marks of God's Ekklēsia: One, Holy, Catholic, and Apostolic". In Dunne, John Anthony; Lewellen, Eric (eds.). One God, One People, One Future: Essays In Honor of N. T. Wright. Minneapolis: Fortress. pp. 167–90. ISBN 9781506448763. OCLC 1080085096.
- ——— (2019). "Romans from the Participationist Perspective". In McKnight, Scot; Modica, Joseph B. (eds.). Preaching Romans. Grand Rapids, MI: Eerdmans. pp. 59–79. ISBN 9780802875457. OCLC 1086375897.
- ——— (2020). "What Did Paul Think God is Doing about What's Wrong?". In Longenecker, Bruce (ed.). The New Cambridge Companion to St. Paul. Cambridge: Cambridge University Press. pp. 187–209. ISBN 9781108423700. OCLC 1123183579.
- ——— (2021). "New Testament Theology and Spiritual Formation". Spiritual Formation for the Global Church: A Multi-Denominational, Multi-Ethnic Approach. Downers Grove, IL: InterVarsity. pp. 17–35. ISBN 9780830855186. OCLC 1253442345.
- ——— (2023). "The Discipline of Cruciformity: Civil Religion and the Missional Power of the Cross". In Warren, Janet (ed.). Singing into a Vacuum: The Missional Shape of Spiritual Disciplines. Eugene, OR: Cascade.

=== Articles ===
- ——— (2011). "Romans: The First Christian Treatise on Theosis". Journal of Theological Interpretation. 5 (1): 13–34 – via Scholarly Publishing Collective.
- ——— (2013). "The Lord of Peace: Christ our Peace in Pauline Theology". Journal for the Study of Paul and His Letters. 3 (2): 219–53 – via Scholarly Publishing Collective.
- ——— (2017). "Cruciform or Resurrectiform? Paul's Paradoxical Practice of Participation". Ex Auditu. 33: 60–83.
- ——— (2018). "John: The Nonsectarian, Missional Gospel". The Canadian-American Theological Review. 7: 138–62.
- ——— (2021). "Traces of the Trinity in 1 Corinthians". Journal of Theological Interpretation. 15 (2): 291–304 – via Scholarly Publishing Collective.
- ——— (2022). "The Cross as God's Self-Exegesis: Some Contributions from Paul and John". Interpretation. 76 (1): 15–26.
- ———; Maillet, Paul; Hancock, Rebecca (2023). "Teaching Scripture in a Catholic Seminary". Seminary Journal. 21 (1): 49–67.
