= Markus Bockmuehl =

Canadian religious studies scholar

- Born: 1961 (age 64–65)
- Parent: Klaus Bockmuehl

Academic background
- Education: University of British Columbia; Regent College; University of Cambridge
- Thesis: Revelation and Mystery in Ancient Judaism and Pauline Christianity (1987)

Academic work
- Discipline: Biblical studies
- Sub-discipline: New Testament studies
- Institutions: Regent College; Fitzwilliam College, Cambridge; University of St Andrews; Keble College, Oxford

Markus Bockmuehl (born 1961) is a Canadian biblical scholar. He has been the Dean Ireland's Professor of the Exegesis of Holy Scripture at the University of Oxford since 2014, and a Fellow of Keble College, Oxford, since 2007.

== Biography ==
Bockmuehl previously taught at Regent College, University of British Columbia, at the University of Cambridge, and at the University of St Andrews.

Bockmuehl's father, Klaus, was Professor of Theology and Ethics at Regent College in Vancouver, Canada.

== Works ==
=== Thesis ===
- Bockmuehl, Markus (1987). Revelation and Mystery in Ancient Judaism and Pauline Christianity (PhD thesis). Cambridge: University of Cambridge.

=== Books ===
- Bockmuehl, Markus (1990). Revelation and Mystery in Ancient Judaism and Pauline Christianity. Wissenschaftliche Untersuchungen zum Neuen Testament, 2. Reihe. Vol. 36. Tübingen: J. C. B. Mohr. ISBN 978-3-161-45339-7. OCLC 21459095. - based on revised PhD thesis
- ——— (1994). This Jesus: Martyr, Lord, Messiah. Edinburgh: T & T Clark. ISBN 978-0-567-29250-6. OCLC 31457178.
- ——— (1997). A Commentary on the Epistle to the Philippians. Black's New Testament Commentaries. London: A & C Black. ISBN 978-0-713-64010-6. OCLC 38843361.
- ———; Thompson, Michael B., eds. (1997). A Vision for the Church: studies in early Christian ecclesiology in honour of J. P. M. Sweet. Edinburgh: T & T Clark. ISBN 978-0-567-08573-3. OCLC 60140180.
- ——— (1998). The Epistle to the Philippians. Black's New Testament Commentaries. Vol. 11. Peabody, MA: Hendrickson Publishers. ISBN 978-1-565-63350-6. OCLC 38732109. - republication by new publisher
- ——— (2000). Jewish Law in Gentile Churches: Halakhah and the beginning of Christian public ethics. Edinburgh: T & T Clark. ISBN 978-0-567-08734-8. OCLC 45304172.
- ———, ed. (2001). The Cambridge Companion to Jesus. Cambridge Companions to Religion. Cambridge; New York: Cambridge University Press. ISBN 978-0-521-79261-5. OCLC 46576117.
- ———; Hagner, Donald Alfred, eds. (2005). The Written Gospel. Cambridge, UK; New York: Cambridge University Press. ISBN 978-0-521-83285-4. OCLC 60371178.
- ——— (2006). Seeing the Word: Refocusing New Testament Study. Studies in theological interpretation. Grand Rapids, MI: Baker Academic. ISBN 978-0-801-02761-1. OCLC 67240274.
- ———; Paget, James Carleton, eds. (2007). Redemption and Resistance: the messianic hopes of Jews and Christians in antiquity. London; New York: T & T Clark. ISBN 978-0-567-03043-6. OCLC 144226306.
- ———; Torrance, Alan J., eds. (2008). Scripture's Doctrine and Theology's Bible: how the New Testament shapes Christian dogmatics. Grand Rapids, MI: Baker Academic. ISBN 978-0-801-03601-9. OCLC 233591855.
- ——— (2010). The Remembered Peter: in Ancient Reception & Modern Debate. Wissenschaftliche Untersuchungen zum Neuen Testament. Vol. 262. Tübingen: Mohr Siebeck. ISBN 978-3-161-50580-5. OCLC 679933175.
- ———; Stroumsa, Guy G., eds. (2010). Paradise in Antiquity: Jewish and Christian views. Cambridge; New York: Cambridge University Press. ISBN 978-0-521-11786-9. OCLC 496958923.
- ——— (2012). Simon Peter in Scripture and Memory: the New Testament apostle in the early church. Grand Rapids, MI: Baker Academic. ISBN 978-0-801-04864-7. OCLC 775419986.
- ———; Stanton, Graham; Lincicum, David (2013). Studies in Matthew and Early Christianity. Wissenschaftliche Untersuchungen zum Neuen Testament. Vol. 309. Tübingen: Mohr Siebeck. ISBN 978-3-161-52543-8. OCLC 854521479.
- ———; Eubank, Nathan, eds. (2024). The Creed and the Scriptures. Mohr Siebeck. ISBN 9783161639302.
- ———, ed. (2025). The New Cambridge Companion to Jesus. Cambridge Companions to Religion. Cambridge; New York: Cambridge University Press. ISBN 9781009233002.

=== Chapters ===
- ——— (2012). "Aquinas on Abraham in Romans 4". In Levering, Matthew; Dauphinais, M. (eds.). Reading Romans With St Thomas Aquinas. Catholic University of America Press. ISBN 978-0-813-21963-9.
- ——— (2013). "The Son of David and the Gospel". In Rudolph, David J.; Willitts, Joel (eds.). Introduction to Messianic Judaism. Grand Rapids, MI: Zondervan. ISBN 978-0-310-33063-9.

=== Articles ===
- ——— (2012). "'Creatio ex Nihilo' in Palestinian Judaism and Early Christianity". Scottish Journal of Theology. 65 (3): 253–70. doi:10.1017/S0036930612000105. S2CID 170140995.
- ——— (2012). "The Transformation of Simon Peter". Crux. 48 (3): 13–22.
- ——— (2012). "Hope and optimism in straitened times". Pro Ecclesia. 21: 7–24. doi:10.1177/106385121202100101. S2CID 151180128.
- ——— (2012). "The Baptism of Jesus as Super-Sacrament of Redemption". Theology. 115 (2): 83–91. doi:10.1177/0040571X11430891. S2CID 170936686.
- ——— (2014). "Wright's Paul in a Cloud of (Other) Witnesses". Journal for the Study of Paul and His Letters. 4: 59–70. doi:10.2307/26371725. JSTOR 26371725.
- ——— (2014). "Review Article: Francis Watson, Gospel Writing (Grand Rapids: Eerdmans, 2013)". Journal of Theological Studies. 65: 195–211.
