= Klaus Bockmuehl =

Klaus Erich Bockmuehl (May 6, 1931 — June 10, 1989) was a Professor of Systematic Theology and Ethics at Regent College, Vancouver.

== Biography ==
Bockmuehl was shaped by the teaching of Wilhelm Busch (not to be confused with Wilhelm Busch, a German humorist), the German pietist pastor of Weigle House, and was inspired about the importance of Christian mission through an encounter with Toyohiko Kagawa, when Kagawa was visiting Weigle House in 1950. He later pursued theological and philosophical studies, completing a DTheol at the University of Basel in 1959. During this time he studied with Karl Barth and briefly worked as the teaching assistant of Jürgen Moltmann.

After receiving his doctorate, Bockmuehl was ordained in 1961 and served as a pastor in a Reformed Church in Düren. He held various posts in Heidelberg and Schmieheim, and from 1965 to 1971 worked part-time as a lecturer at St. Chrischona seminary in Bettingen near Basel. From 1977 until his death in 1989, Bockmuehl was Professor of Theology and Ethics at Regent College in Vancouver, Canada.

He died on June 10, 1989, due to stomach cancer.

His son, Markus, is a biblical scholar at the University of Oxford.

== Works ==
- Bockmuehl, Klaus (1990). Listening to the God Who Speaks: Reflections on God's Guidance from Scripture and the Lives of God's People. Helmers & Howard. ISBN 978-0-939443-18-5.
- Bockmuehl, Klaus (1994). The Christian Way of Living. Regent College Publishing. ISBN 978-1-57383-023-2.
- Bockmuehl, Klaus (2007). The Story of Modern Protestant Theology. Regent College Publishing. ISBN 978-1-57383-337-0.
