= Nigel Biggar =

British Anglican priest and theologian (born 1955)

The Reverend Canon and Right Honourable The Lord Biggar CBE
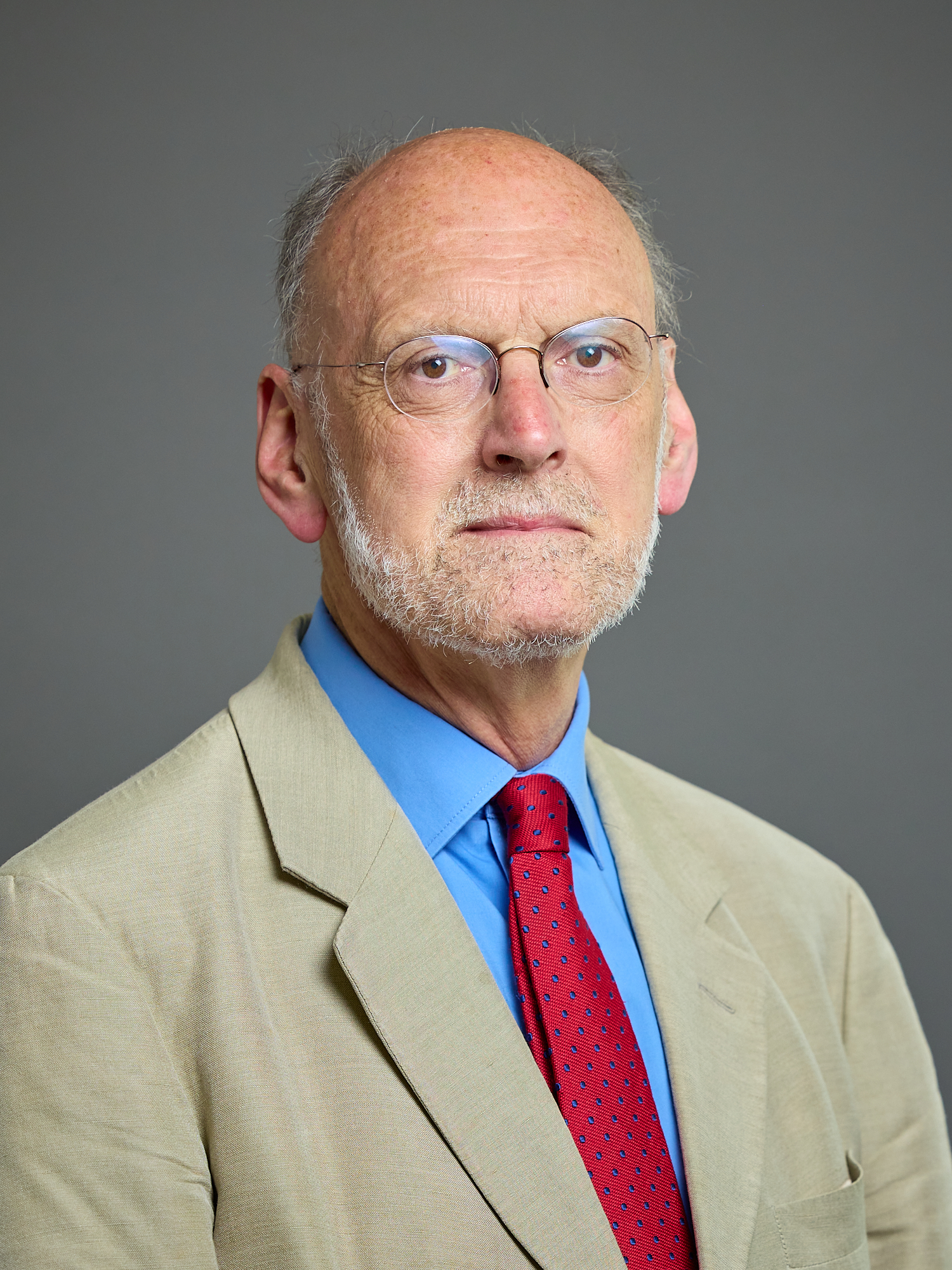
- Biggar in 2025

Regius Professor of Moral and Pastoral Theology
- In office 1 October 2007 – September 2022
- Preceded by: Oliver O'Donovan
- Succeeded by: Luke Bretherton

Member of the House of Lords
- Lord Temporal
- Life peerage 21 January 2025

Personal details
- Born: Nigel John Biggar; 14 March 1955 (age 71) Castle Douglas, Scotland
- Party: Conservative
- Website: nigelbiggar.uk

Ecclesiastical career
- Religion: Christianity
- Church: Church of England
- Ordained: 1990 (deacon); 1991 (priest)

Academic background
- Education: Worcester College, Oxford (MA); Regent College (MA); University of Chicago (MA, PhD)
- Doctoral advisor: James Gustafson
- Influences: Karl Barth; John Rawls

Academic work
- Discipline: Theology
- Institutions: Oriel College, Oxford; University of Leeds; Trinity College Dublin; Christ Church, Oxford

Nigel John Biggar, Baron Biggar (born 14 March 1955) is a British Anglican priest, theologian, ethicist, and life peer. From 2007 to 2022, he was Regius Professor of Moral and Pastoral Theology at the University of Oxford. He has been a member of the House of Lords since 2025, taking the Conservative Party whip.

== Early life and education ==
Nigel John Biggar was born on 14 March 1955 in Castle Douglas, Scotland.

He was educated at Monkton Combe School, a private school near Bath, Somerset. He studied modern history at Worcester College, Oxford, graduating with a Bachelor of Arts degree in 1976. As per tradition, his BA was promoted to a Master of Arts degree in 1988.

Biggar attended the University of Chicago, graduating with a Master of Arts degree in religious studies in 1980; and the evangelical Regent College in Vancouver, graduating with a Master of Christian Studies in 1981. He returned to the University of Chicago to study for his doctorate in Christian theology and completed a Doctor of Philosophy degree in 1986.

== Career ==
On his return to Oxford in 1985, Biggar became librarian and research fellow at Latimer House, Oxford. He additionally taught Christian ethics at Wycliffe Hall, Oxford, from 1987 to 1994.

He was ordained in the Church of England as a deacon in 1990 and as a priest in 1991, though he has never held a post in a parish church. For most of the 1990s, he was chaplain and fellow of Oriel College, Oxford. In 1999, he took the Chair of Theology at the University of Leeds, and in 2004, he moved to the Chair of Theology and Ethics at Trinity College Dublin, where he became a fellow in 2005.

In 2007, he became Regius Professor of Moral and Pastoral Theology at the University of Oxford. He also became a canon of Christ Church Cathedral, Oxford. He retired in September 2022.

=== Ethics and Empire project ===
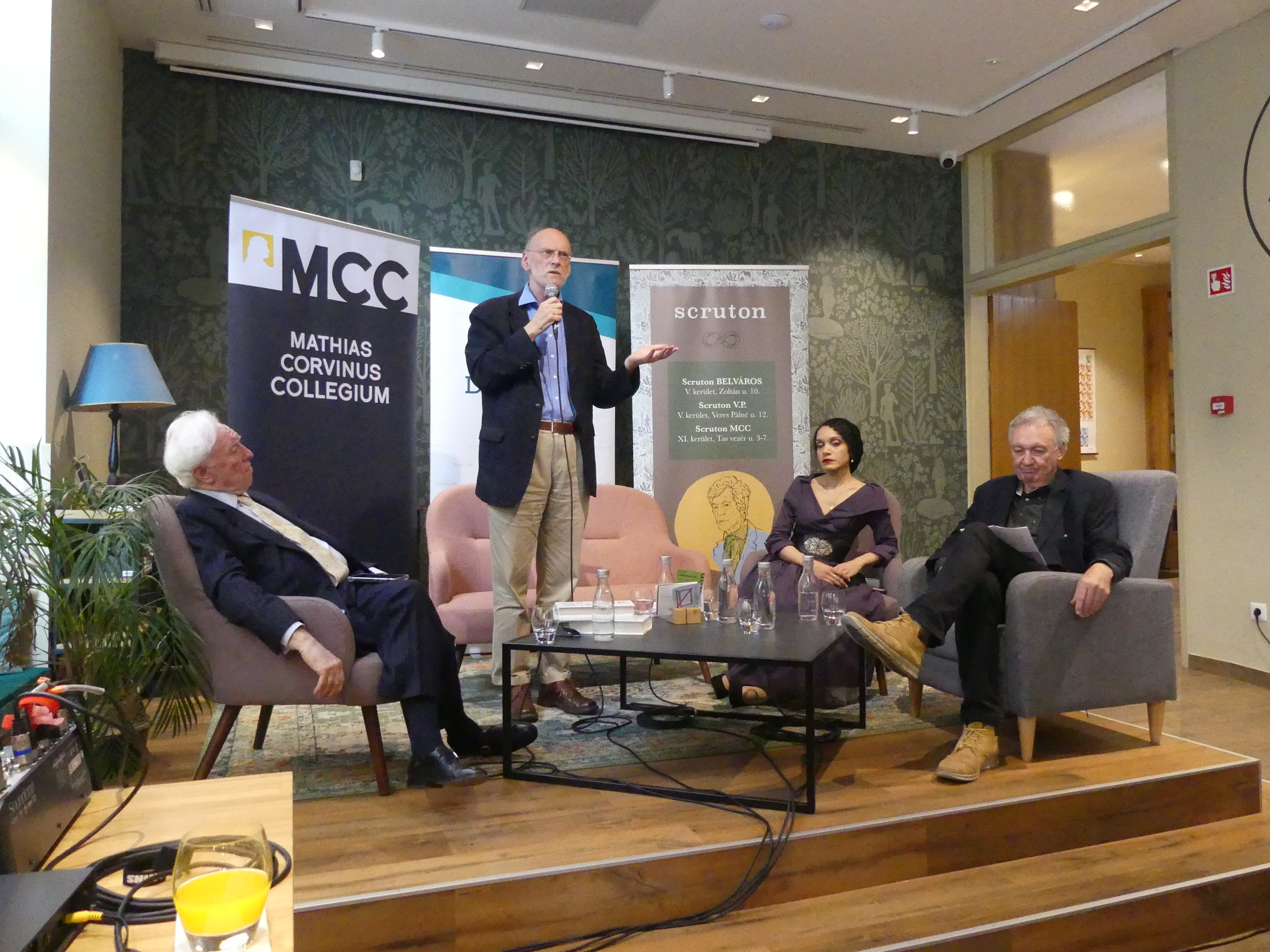
At Scruton Veres Pálné, Budapest, Hungary

In 2017, Biggar initiated a five-year project at Oxford University, entitled "Ethics and Empire". Its stated aim was to scrutinise critiques against the historical facts of Empire. Historians and academics widely criticised the project, claiming that it was "attempting to balance out the violence committed in the name of empire with its supposed benefits". The project also received criticism for failing to engage with the wider scholarship on empire and not submitting itself to peer scrutiny and rigorous academic debate.

Biggar addressed the ethics of colonialism in an op-ed for The Times, arguing that the history of the British Empire was morally mixed and that guilt around Britain's colonial legacy may have gone too far. He also defended an article by Bruce Gilley, titled "The Case for Colonialism", asserting that Gilley's appeal for a balanced reappraisal of the colonial past was both courageous and a call for Britain to moderate its post-imperial guilt.

=== Colonialism: A Moral Reckoning ===
Biggar's 2023 book, Colonialism: A Moral Reckoning, which examines the morality of colonialism, was initially accepted by Bloomsbury, but it chose not to publish it, with the suggestion that "public feeling on the subject does not currently support the publication of the book". It was eventually published by HarperCollins, in 2023.

The book has received both praise and criticism. Kenan Malik of The Guardian said that while Colonialism "claims to be a 'moral reckoning', moral questions are rarely taken seriously", and "in seeking to challenge what he regards as cartoonish views of imperial history, Biggar has produced something equally cartoonish, a politicised history that ill-serves his aim of defending 'western values'." Rudrangshu Mukherjee wrote in The Wire that Colonialism is an "immoral book" that ignores "the structural logic of empire" linking "the development of capitalism and prosperity in Britain with the political control, the economic exploitation and the impoverishment of the colonies", and that it fails "the most elementary test of scholarship".

In contrast, Trevor Phillips in The Sunday Times said that it "carries the intellectual force of a Javelin antitank missile", stating that he "find[s] it hard to disagree" with Biggar's thesis. Jonathan Sumption in the Literary Review described it as "an important book as well as a courageous one" and said that "in general, [Biggar's] approach is objective and he fairly addresses the contrary arguments". In The Daily Telegraph, Tim Stanley considered the book "thoughtful" and "compelling", one that introduced facts, some of which he was unaware of, indicating that "much that is benign about our civilisation has been forgotten", but concluded that Biggar "is spoiling for a fight, and I fear he's going to get one".

In a review for The Journal of Imperial and Commonwealth History, historian Alan Lester criticised Biggar for giving a favourable image of colonialism, describing Biggar's argument that anti-slavery dominated British policy during the second half of the empire's existence as "absurd", and sees a "persistent double standard" in how Biggar judges British versus non-British actions that "are hard to justify morally". Biggar replied in the same journal, accusing Lester of "political bias, smearing by association, the erection of strawmen, careless reading, misrepresentation, misunderstanding, unsupported assertions, a disappointing absence of open thoughtfulness, and a striking lack of critical self-awareness".

He was a speaker at the right-wing Alliance for Responsible Citizenship (ARC) conference in 2026. He was also a speaker at NatCon UK's 2023 conference in London. He serves on the editorial board of the Journal of Controversial Ideas.

== Honours ==
Biggar was appointed Commander of the Order of the British Empire in the 2021 Birthday Honours, for services to higher education.

In late 2024, Biggar was nominated for a life peerage by Kemi Badenoch, the leader of the Conservative Party. On 21 January 2025, he was made Baron Biggar of Castle Douglas in the Stewartry of Kirkcudbright. He was introduced to the House of Lords on 28 January, where he sits as a Conservative peer.

== Selected publications ==
- The Hastening that Waits: Karl Barth's Ethics (1993) ISBN 978-0-19-826390-6
- Good Life: Reflections on What We Value Today (1997) ISBN 978-0-281-05023-9
- The Revival of Natural Law: Philosophical, Theological and Ethical Responses to the Finnes-Grisez School, with Rufus Black (2000) ISBN 978-1-138-25671-2
- Burying the Past: Making Peace and Doing Justice After Civil Conflict (2001) ISBN 978-0-87840-394-3
- Aiming to Kill: The Ethics of Euthanasia and Assisted Suicide (2003) ISBN 978-0-232-52406-2
- with Hogan, Linda, eds. (2009). Religious Voices in Public Places. Oxford: Oxford University Press. ISBN 978-0-19-956662-4.
- Behaving in Public: How to Do Christian Ethics (2011) ISBN 978-0-8028-6400-0
- In Defence of War (2013) ISBN 978-0-19-872583-1
- Between Kin and Cosmopolis: An Ethic of the Nation (2014) ISBN 978-1-62032-513-1
- What's Wrong with Rights? (2020) ISBN 978-0-19-286727-8
- Colonialism: A Moral Reckoning (2023) ISBN 978-0-00-851163-0
- Reparations: The Tyranny of Imaginary Guilt (2025) ISBN 978-1-80075-651-9
- The New Dark Age: Why Liberals Must Win the Culture Wars (2026) ISBN 978-1-5095-6833-8

Academic offices
Preceded by Oliver O'Donovan	Regius Professor of Moral and Pastoral Theology; University of Oxford; 2007–2022	Succeeded by Luke Bretherton
