= McDonald Centre =

Research institute at the University of Oxford

The McDonald Centre for Theology, Ethics & Public Life is a research institute in the University of Oxford, which is based within the Faculty of Theology and Religion. It seeks to connect theological insight, interdisciplinary inquiry, and civic imagination to address the ethical & existential challenges facing humanity. The director of the McDonald Centre is Luke Bretherton, Regius Professor of Moral and Pastoral Theology, who took up the post in 2025, and the McDonald Postdoctoral Fellow is Samuel Tranter.

The institute is named for Al McDonald, the former worldwide CEO of McKinsey, who funded its establishment.
