= Rufus Black =

Australian academic

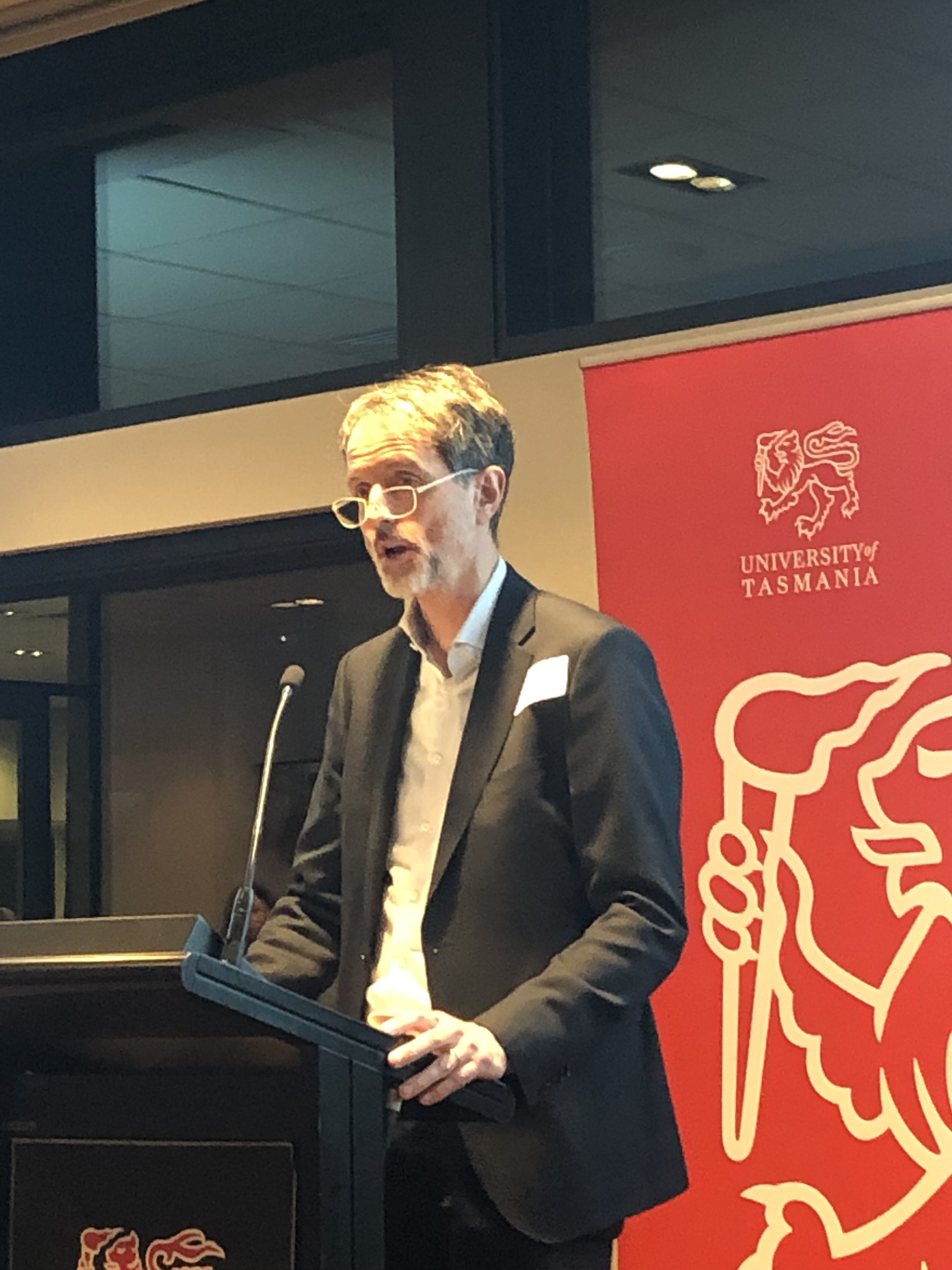
- Black in 2019

20th Vice Chancellor of the University of Tasmania
- Incumbent
- Assumed office 1 March 2018
- Chancellor: Michael Field; Alison Watkins
- Preceded by: Peter Rathjen

Personal details
- Born: Rufus Edward Ries Black; May 20, 1969 (age 57)
- Education: University of Melbourne (BA, LLB); Keble College, Oxford (MPhil); Magdalen College, Oxford (PhD)

Academic background
- Thesis: Towards an Ecumenical Ethic: Reconciling the Work of Stanley Hauerwas, Germain Grisez, and Oliver O'Donovan (1996)
- Doctoral advisor: Oliver O'Donovan

Academic work
- Discipline: Theology
- Institutions: Ormond College; Victoria University; University of Tasmania

Rufus Edward Ries Black (born 20 May 1969) is the 20th vice-chancellor of the University of Tasmania.

== Early life and education ==
Black, the son of former Federal Court of Australia Chief Justice, was educated at Wesley College and the University of Melbourne, where he resided at Ormond College and graduated with a Bachelor of Arts in politics and economics and a Bachelor of Laws with honours in 1994. He won a Rhodes Scholarship in 1992, and obtained a Diploma of Theology and Master of Philosophy in Ethics and Theology in 1994 from Keble College, Oxford. He was awarded a Doctor of Philosophy in Ethics and Theology from Magdalen College, Oxford in 1996. His DPhil thesis was entitled "Towards an Ecumenical Ethic: Reconciling the Work of Stanley Hauerwas, Germain Grisez and Oliver O'Donovan".

== Career ==
Black has been vice-chancellor and president of the University of Tasmania since March 2018.

Black began his academic career at Oxford University as a tutor from 1994 to 1996. From 1997 to 1999, he served as chaplain of Ormond College and the Sanderson Fellow at the United Faculty of Theology, where he lectured in ethics. He has combined an academic career with experience in public policy and consulting at McKinsey & Company, where he worked for nine years as a consultant from 2000 to 2006 and later as a partner from 2007 to 2008.

Black was involved across the education sector as master of Ormond from 2009 to 2017, deputy chancellor of Victoria University from 2013 to 2017 and the founding chair of the board for Teach for Australia from 2009 to 2017. He was a director of the New York-based Teach for All from 2010 to 2015. He was a director of the law firm Corrs Chambers Westgarth, the Walter and Eliza Hall Institute, Museums Victoria and Innovation Science Australia. Black co-founded the Wade Institute of Entrepreneurship. Before joining the University of Tasmania he was the Professor of Enterprise in the Department of Management and Marketing, principal fellow in the Department of Philosophy and a member of the programs team at the Centre for Ethical Leadership at the University of Melbourne.

== Public policy work ==
Black's public policy work has included leading the budget audit of the Department of Defence in 2009, the accountability and governance review of the Department of Defence ("The Black Review") in 2010 and the prime minister's independent review of the Australian Intelligence Community in 2011. He was the strategic advisor to the secretary for education in Victoria from 2012 to 2014.

== Bibliography ==
- 'The Revival of Natural Law: Philosophical, Theological and Ethical Responses to the Finnis-Grisez School' (2000) (written with Nigel Bigger CBE) ISBN 978-1-138-25671-2
- `Christian Moral Realism: Natural Law, Narrative Virtue and the Gospel' (2001) ISBN 978-0-19-827020-1.
- 'Ethics at War: How Should Military Personnel make Ethical Decisions?' (2023) (written with Dean-Peter Baker, Roger Herbert, and Iain King CBE) ISBN 978-1-032-32121-9.

Academic offices
Preceded by Peter Rathjen	20th Vice-Chancellor of the University of Tasmania; 2018–present	Incumbent
