= The Clerks of Christ Church =

Religious music group

The Clerks of Christ Church are a religious music group from Christ Church, Oxford. It was founded in 2001 in response to a popular demand for a group providing flexible programming for a variety of occasions. Its intention was to perform a total spectrum of vocal music; Sacred music from all eras (particularly Renaissance), and secular music from mediaeval rounds, through to madrigals, folk song arrangements, romantic part songs, spirituals, comic songs and close harmony arrangements of pop songs and the American songbook. The Clerks of Christ Church serves as a welcome opportunity to explore alternative and often neglected areas of the choral repertoire. All members of the group are (or have at some time been) members of Christ Church Cathedral Choir, but have performed with other consorts including The Sixteen, Tenebrae, Huelgas Ensemble, European Voices, The Clerks Group, Cardinall's Musick and The Gabrielli Consort.

The Clerks of Christ Church have performed in venues as far apart as Christ Church, Oxford, and Christchurch, New Zealand (where they toured in 2002, 2003 and 2004); as various as Le Manoir aux Quat' Saisons (Raymond Blanc's restaurant and hotel) and Dorchester and Douai Abbeys; as well as performing for the memorial service of Lord Jenkins, the Chancellor of the University of Oxford, and in the presence of The Rt. Hon. Tony Blair M.P. In July 2004 The Clerks of Christ Church made their film debut in Sir Richard Eyre's Stage Beauty, starring Billy Crudup and Claire Danes.

The group's debut disc, In Pace, was released in 2004. The Clerks of Christ Church have now signed exclusively for SOMM Records. A Garland of the Elizabethan is their first disc since signing, and will be followed by a disc celebrating the quincentenary of Thomas Tallis' birth, the music being Tallis' contribution to the 1575 publication Cantiones Sacrae.
