= Oliver O'Donovan =

British Anglican priest and academic

The Reverend Oliver O'Donovan FRSE FBA
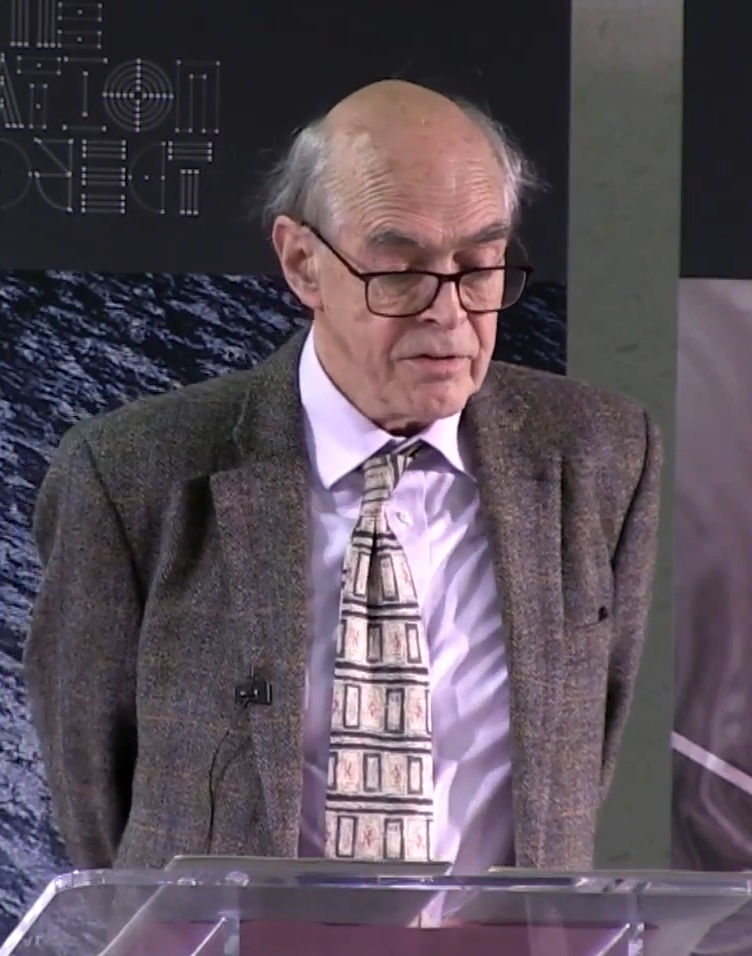
- O'Donovan giving a talk in 2023
- Born: Oliver Michael Timothy O'Donovan; 28 June 1945 (age 81); London, England
- Spouse: Joan Lockwood O'Donovan (m. 1978)
- Parents: Joan Knape; Frank O'Connor

Ecclesiastical career
- Religion: Christianity (Anglican)
- Church: Church of England
- Ordained: 1972 (deacon); 1973 (priest)

Academic background
- Education: Wycliffe Hall, Oxford
- Thesis: The Problem of Self-Love in St. Augustine (1975)
- Doctoral advisor: Henry Chadwick; Paul Ramsey
- Influences: Augustine of Hippo

Academic work
- Discipline: Theology
- Sub-discipline: Christian ethics; political theology
- School or tradition: Postliberalism
- Institutions: Wycliffe Hall, Oxford; Wycliffe College, Toronto; Christ Church, Oxford; University of Edinburgh
- Notable students: John Hughes
- Influenced: James K. A. Smith

Oliver Michael Timothy O'Donovan FRSE FBA (born 28 June 1945) is a British Anglican priest and academic, known for his work in the field of Christian ethics. He has also made contributions to political theology, both contemporary and historical. He was Regius Professor of Moral and Pastoral Theology at the University of Oxford from 1982 to 2006, and Professor of Christian Ethics and Practical Theology at the University of Edinburgh from 2006 to 2013.

== Early life and education ==
O'Donovan was born on 28 June 1945. He is the son of Joan Knape and Michael Francis O'Donovan (1906–1966), better known as Frank O'Connor, eminent Irish writer of short stories and memoirs.

His doctoral thesis on the problem of self-love in Augustine of Hippo was completed under both Henry Chadwick at Oxford and Paul Ramsey at Princeton.

== Career ==
=== Ordained ministry ===
O'Donovan was ordained in the Church of England as a deacon in 1972 and as a priest in 1973. A scholar-priest, he has never undertaken parish ministry. He was a Canon Residentiary of Christ Church Cathedral, Oxford, from 1982 to 2006. He served on the General Synod of the Church of England from 2005 to 2006. Since November 2015, he has been a Canon Provincial (of the Province of York) and the Provincial Theologian at York Minster. He has also held permission to officiate in the Diocese of York since 2015.

O'Donovan has been active in ecumenical dialogue. He was part of the Anglican–Orthodox Joint Doctrinal Discussions from 1982 to 1984, and a member of the Anglican–Roman Catholic International Commission (ARCIC) from 1985 to 1990.

=== Academic career ===
O'Donovan taught at Wycliffe Hall, Oxford (1972–1977), and at Wycliffe College, Toronto (1977–1982). He was Regius Professor of Moral and Pastoral Theology and Canon of Christ Church at the University of Oxford (1982–2006). He then held the post of Professor of Christian Ethics and Practical Theology at the School of Divinity, New College, Edinburgh (2006–2013), and was an associate director of the Centre for Theology and Public Issues. He is a past President of the Society for the Study of Christian Ethics.

In 2001 he delivered the Stob Lectures at Calvin Theological Seminary. In 2007 he delivered the New College Lectures at New College, University of New South Wales. O'Donovan cites these New College Lectures as his first opportunity to explore the ideas that would become his "Ethics as Theology" trilogy of books. In 2008 he delivered a lecture at Princeton Theological Seminary upon receiving the Abraham Kuyper Prize for Excellence in Reformed Theology and Public Life.

In 2021, he delivered the Gifford Lectures on The Disappearance of Ethics at the University of St Andrews. O'Donovan has held distinguished visiting lectureships in the universities of Durham and Cambridge, the Gregorian University in Rome, McMaster University in Hamilton, Ontario, St. Patrick's College, Maynooth, the University of Hong Kong, and Fuller Theological Seminary, Pasadena, California.

== Personal life ==
In 1978 he married Joan Lockwood O'Donovan. They have jointly authored two books on the history of Christian political thought, and have two sons, Matthew and Paul.

== Public lectures ==
In 1998, O’Donovan delivered the twelfth Erasmus Lecture, titled Government as Judgment, sponsored by First Things magazine and the Institute on Religion and Public Life. In his lecture, O’Donovan explored the theological foundations of political authority, arguing that the act of governance reflects divine judgment when ordered toward justice and the common good. The lecture exemplified his broader interest in Christian ethics, political theology, and moral reasoning.

== Honours ==
He has been a Fellow of the British Academy since 2000 and a Fellow of the Royal Society of Edinburgh since 2009. In 2023, he received an honorary doctorate from the Swiss private university STH Basel.

== Publications ==
Books

- Entering into Rest: Volume 3: Ethics as Theology (Eerdmans 2017) ISBN 978-0-8028-7359-0
- Finding and Seeking: Volume 2: Ethics as Theology (Eerdmans 2014) ISBN 0-8028-7187-9
- Self, World, and Time: Volume 1: Ethics as Theology: An Induction (Eerdmans 2013) ISBN 0-8028-6921-1
- The Word in Small Boats: Sermons from Oxford (Eerdmans 2010) ISBN 0-8028-6453-8
- A Conversation Waiting to Begin: The Churches and the Gay Controversy (SCM 2009) ISBN 0-334-04210-0
- Church in crisis: The gay controversy and the Anglican Communion. (Eugene, Or: Cascade Books. 2008) ISBN 1556358970
- The Ways of Judgment (Eerdmans 2005) ISBN 0-8028-2920-1
- The Just War Revisited (CUP 2003) ISBN 0-5215-3899-8
- Common Objects of Love (Eerdmans 2002) ISBN 0-8028-6349-3
- The Desire of the Nations (CUP 1996) ISBN 0-521-66516-7
- New Dictionary of Christian Ethics & Pastoral Theology (co-edited) (IVP Academic, 1995) ISBN 0-8308-1408-6
- Peace and Certainty (Eerdmans 1989) ISBN 0-8028-0414-4
- Resurrection and Moral Order (IVP 1986, 2nd ed IVP/Eerdmans 1994) ISBN 0-8028-0692-9
- On the Thirty-Nine Articles (Paternoster 1986 and SCM 2011) ISBN 0-3340-4398-0
- Begotten or Made? (OUP 1984) ISBN 0-1982-6678-2
- Principles in the Public Realm: The Dilemma of Christian Moral Witness. (Oxford 1984) [Oxfordshire: Clarendon Press.] ISBN 0-19-951539-5
- The Problem of Self-Love in Saint Augustine (Yale 1979) ISBN 0-300-02468-1

Academic offices
| Preceded by Peter Baelz | Regius Professor of Moral and Pastoral Theology; 1982–2006 | Succeeded by Nigel Biggar |
