= Thomas Strong (bishop) =

Bishop of Oxford (1861–1944)

The Right Reverend Thomas Strong GBE
- Bishop of Oxford
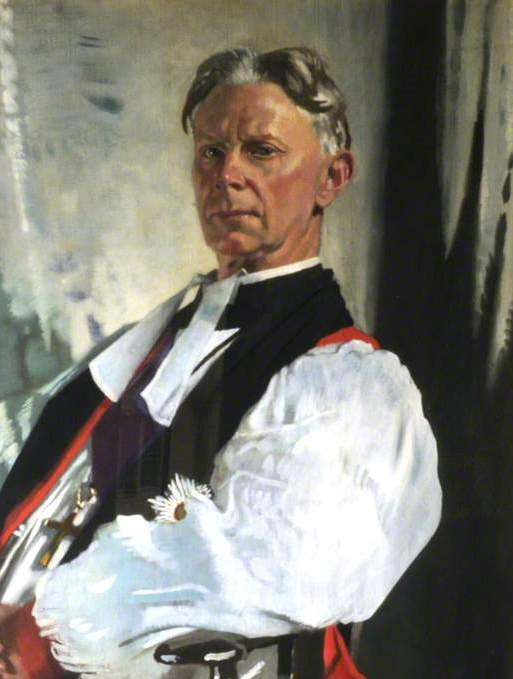
- Portrait c. 1923
- Church: Church of England
- Province: Canterbury
- Diocese: Oxford
- Elected: 1925
- In office: 1925–1937
- Predecessor: Hubert Burge
- Successor: Kenneth Kirk
- Other posts: Vice-Chancellor of the University of Oxford (1913–1917); Dean of Christ Church (1901–1920); Bishop of Ripon (1920–1925)

Orders
- Ordination: 1885 (deacon); 1886 (priest)

Personal details
- Born: 24 October 1861
- Died: 8 July 1944 (aged 82)
- Buried: Christ Church Cathedral, Oxford
- Denomination: Anglican
- Occupation: Priest, theologian
- Education: Christ Church, Oxford

Thomas Banks Strong (24 October 1861 – 8 July 1944) was an English Anglican bishop and theologian. He served as Bishop of Ripon and Oxford. He was also Dean of Christ Church, Oxford and served as vice-chancellor of Oxford University during the First World War.

Thomas Strong was educated at Westminster School and Christ Church, Oxford, where he received a second-class degree in Literae Humaniores in 1883. He became a deacon in 1885 and a priest in 1886. At Christ Church, Strong was successively Lecturer (1884), Student (1888), Censor (1892), and then Dean (1901–1920). He received the degree Doctor of Divinity (DD) from the University of Oxford in January 1902.

In 1920 he was appointed Bishop of Ripon, and in 1925 was translated as Bishop of Oxford, serving as such, and as Clerk of the Closet and Chancellor of the Order of the Garter until 1937.

Strong produced a number of theological publications.

He became a Knight Grand Cross of the Order of the British Empire (GBE) in 1918. He was buried at Christ Church Cathedral, Oxford.

== Selected books ==
- Christian Ethics: Eight Lectures (Longmans, Green and Co., 1896)
- Manual of Theology (1st 1892, 2nd 1903)
- God and the Individual (1903; Kessinger Publishing Company, 2008, ISBN 978-1436859868)
- Lectures on the Method of Science (Oxford: Clarendon Press, 1906)
- The Place of Scripture in the Church in Ancient and Modern Times (1917)
- The Educational Function of Choir Schools (1931)
- Visitation Charge of the Bishop of Oxford at the Diocesan Visitation 1931 (Oxford University Press, 1931)

Church of England titles
Preceded by Thomas Drury	Bishop of Ripon; 1920–1925	Succeeded by Edward Burroughs
Preceded by Hubert Burge	Bishop of Oxford; 1925–1937	Succeeded by Kenneth Kirk
Academic offices
Preceded by Francis Paget	Dean of Christ Church, Oxford; 1901–1920	Succeeded by Henry Julian White
Preceded by Charles Buller Heberden	Vice-Chancellor of Oxford University; 1913–1917	Succeeded by Herbert Edward Douglas Blakiston
