= Kenneth Kirk =

English Anglican bishop

The Right Reverend Kenneth Kirk
- Bishop of Oxford
- Church: Church of England
- Diocese: Oxford
- In office: 9 December 1937 – 8 June 1954
- Predecessor: Thomas Strong
- Successor: Harry Carpenter
- Other posts: Regius Professor of Moral and Pastoral Theology, University of Oxford (1933–1938)

Orders
- Ordination: 21 December 1912 (deacon); 1913 (priest)
- Consecration: c. 1937

Personal details
- Born: Kenneth Escott Kirk; 21 February 1886 Sheffield, Yorkshire, England
- Died: 8 June 1954 (aged 68)
- Denomination: Anglicanism
- Education: St John's College, Oxford

Kenneth Escott Kirk (21 February 1886 – 8 June 1954), also known as K. E. Kirk, was an English Anglican bishop. An influential moral theologian, he served as Regius Professor of Moral and Pastoral Theology at the University of Oxford from 1933 to 1938, and then as the Bishop of Oxford in the Church of England from 1937 to 1954.

== Early life and education ==
Kirk was born in Sheffield on 21 February 1886 and was the son of Frank Herbert Kirk who, in turn, was the son of John Kirk (died 1875), a Methodist minister. He was educated at Sheffield Royal Grammar School and St John's College, Oxford, obtaining a double first in classics. He was accepted for graduate study at Keble College, but moved to London instead to work with the Student Christian Movement (SCM). The group was beginning a ministry to the large numbers of Indian students that were coming to England to study. During his time in London he also opened a residential hall for students of University College, London known as Ealing Hall, served as an assistant to the Department of Philosophy there and held a number of executive positions with SCM. He was also active with the university's Officers Training Corps, and was commissioned in the Territorial Force as a second lieutenant on 22 July 1909. He began the process to become ordained as an Anglican priest and was ordained a deacon on 21 December 1912 and moved to a church near Sheffield to begin a curacy, intending to go back to Keble College to finish his graduate study.

When the First World War broke out, however, that proved impossible. Instead, he spent the war with the British Army as a chaplain in France and Flanders. On 16 October 1914, he was commissioned in the Army Chaplains' Department as a temporary Chaplain to the Forces 4th Class (equivalent in rank to captain). He was promoted to temporary Chaplain to the Forces 3rd Class (equivalent to major) on 19 February 1917 while he was senior chaplain to the forces of a division. He reverted back to Chaplain to the Forces 4th Class on 17 October 1917, having been re-posted. He relinquished his commission on 1 September 1921 and was appointed an honorary Chaplain to the Forces 3rd Class.

Kirk was able to return to Oxford in 1919, as a Prize Fellow at Magdalen College and tutor at Keble College. He began working on his first book of moral theology, Some Principles of Moral Theology, published in 1920. He adopted the method of casuistry, where general ethical principles are applied to the practical situations in which moral decisions are made. He revived the study of Christian ethics using casuistry, drawing on the work of Caroline divine Jeremy Taylor (1613–1667). In 1922 he was appointed Fellow and Chaplain of Trinity College and awarded a Bachelor of Divinity degree followed by a Doctor of Divinity degree in 1926. In 1927 he was named Reader in Moral Theology and in 1933 was made the Regius Professor of Moral and Pastoral Theology. His scholarly reputation rests on the books of moral theology that he wrote during the 1920s and 1930s, especially Conscience and Its Problems and The Vision of God: The Christian Doctrine of the Summum Bonum. In many ways he revived the study of moral theology in the Church of England and is considered one of the leading moral theologians of the 20th century.

== Bishop of Oxford ==
Kirk was consecrated a bishop on St Andrew's Day 1937 (30 November), by Cosmo Lang, Archbishop of Canterbury, at St Paul's Cathedral; he was enthroned as Bishop of Oxford at Christ Church Cathedral on 9 December 1937. He began his episcopacy by re-organizing the large, rural diocese and moving the episcopal offices to the city of Oxford. Kirk issued a temporary seal as the function of Chancellor of the Garter was dissociated from the See of Oxford in the wake of the Abdication Crisis. In piety as well as scholarship, Kirk followed in the tradition of the Oxford Movement, emphasizing the sacramental nature of the Catholic Church and apostolic succession. As a result, at the time of the independence of the Anglican Church in India from the Church of England, Kirk was a leader of the Anglo-Catholic party at Lambeth in 1948 that warned the Church from compromising its catholicity by adopting intercommunion too quickly, when not all of the clergy of the United Church of South India would have received episcopal ordination. He worked with the Archbishops of Canterbury, William Temple and his successor Geoffrey Fisher, and with George Bell, Bishop of Chichester, however, in devising a compromise solution, and in May, 1950 a resolution was passed in the English Convocation allowing for limited intercommunion. Kirk died on 8 June 1954, before the resolution was passed in July, 1955, formally inaugurating the communion of the two churches.

The title of his last published work, Beauty and Bands, is that of a sermon he gave at the episcopal consecration of Glyn Simon in Brecon Cathedral.

== Personal life ==
In 1921 Kirk married Beatrice Caynton Yonge Radcliffe; they had three daughters and two sons. Their elder son was Sir Peter Michael Kirk (1928–1977), a Conservative politician. Beatrice died in 1934. One of their daughters, Patricia, married Eric Waldram Kemp, Chaplain of Exeter College, Oxford and later Bishop of Chichester, and author of The Life and Letters of Kenneth Escott Kirk, Bishop of Oxford, 1937–1954 (London: Hodder & Stoughton, 1959).

== Major works ==
- A Study of Silent Minds (1918)
- Some Principles of Moral Theology (1920)
- Ignorance, Faith and Conformity (1925)
- Conscience and Its Problems (1927)
- The Vision of God (The Bampton Lectures of 1928) (1931)
- The Threshold of Ethics (1933)
- Commentary on the Epistle to the Romans (1937)
- The Story of the Woodard Schools (1937)

== Other works ==
- The Church in the Furnace (contributor) (1917)
- Essays Catholic and Critical (contributor) (1926)
- Essays on the Trinity and the Incarnation (contributor) (1928)
- Marriage and Divorce (1933)
- The Fourth River (1935)
- The Study of Theology (editor and contributor) (1939)
- The Apostolic Ministry (editor and contributor) (1946)
- The Church Dedications of the Oxford Diocese (1946)
- Beauty and Bands (collection of articles and sermons) (1955)

Church of England titles
Preceded by Thomas Strong	Bishop of Oxford; 1937–1954	Succeeded by Harry Carpenter
