= Christ Church Cathedral, Oxford =

Cathedral in Oxford, United Kingdom

Christ Church Cathedral
- Cathedral Church of Christ
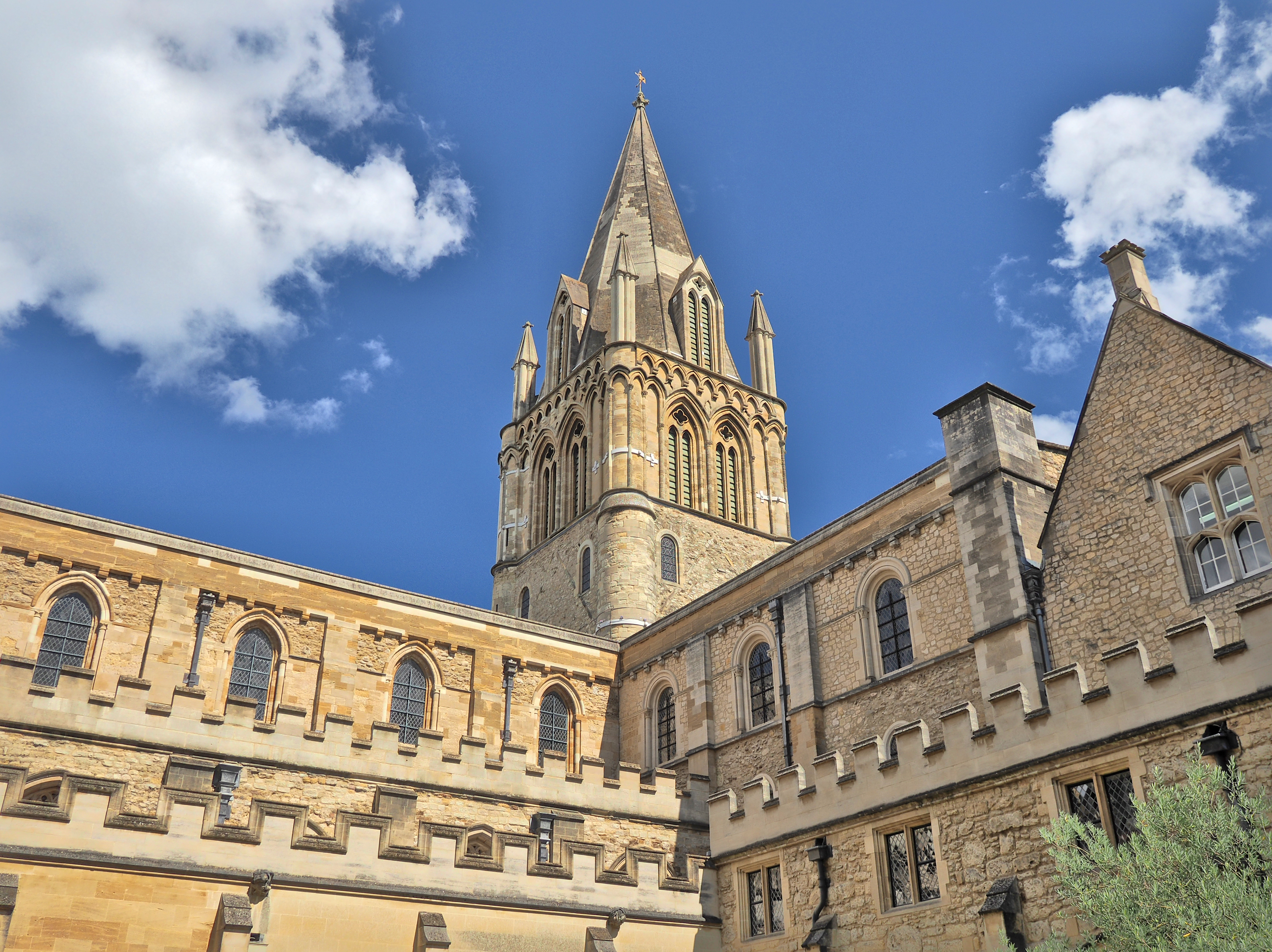
- Crossing tower and spire from the cloisters

- Location within Oxfordshire
- 51°45′0″N 1°15′17″W
- OS grid reference: SP 51547 05977
- Location: Oxford
- Country: England
- Denomination: Church of England
- Previous denomination: Roman Catholic
- Website: chch.ox.ac.uk/cathedral

History
- Status: Active

Architecture
- Functional status: Cathedral
- Heritage designation: Grade I listed
- Designated: 12 January 1954
- Style: Romanesque, Gothic
- Years built: 1160–1200; 826 years ago

Administration
- Province: Canterbury
- Diocese: Oxford

Clergy
- Bishop(s): Steven Croft (diocesan), Gavin Collins (suffragan), David Bull (suffragan), Mary Gregory (suffragan)
- Dean: Sarah Foot

Christ Church Cathedral is an Anglican cathedral in Oxford, England. It is the seat of the bishop of Oxford and the mother church of the Church of England diocese of Oxford. It is also the chapel of Christ Church, a constituent college of the University of Oxford; this dual role is unique in the Church of England. It is administered by the dean of Christ Church, who is also the head of the college, and a governing body.

The first church on the site of the cathedral was a nunnery and parish church which was burnt during the St Brice's Day massacre in 1002; it was re-founded as a priory of Augustinian canons by 1122. The priory was suppressed in 1524 by Cardinal Thomas Wolsey, who intended to demolish the church in order to found a new college on the site. The cardinal fell from favour in 1529 and the project was taken over by Henry VIII, who preserved the church. When the diocese of Oxford was created in 1542 its cathedral was the former Osney Abbey; however, it was supplanted by Christ Church in 1546.

== History ==
The cathedral was originally the church of St Frideswide's Priory. The site was historically presumed to be the location of the nunnery founded by St Frideswide, the patron saint of Oxford, and the shrine is now in the Latin Chapel; originally containing relics translated at the rebuilding in 1180, it was the focus of pilgrimage from at least the 12th until the early 16th century.

In 1522, the priory was surrendered to Cardinal Thomas Wolsey, who had selected it as the site for his proposed college. However, in 1529 the foundation was taken over by Henry VIII. Work stopped, but in June 1532 the college was refounded by the King. In 1546, Henry VIII transferred to it the recently created See of Oxford from Osney. The cathedral has the name Ecclesia Christi Cathedralis Oxoniensis, given to it by Henry VIII's foundation charter.

There has been a choir at the cathedral since 1526, when John Taverner was the organist and also master of the choristers. The statutes of Wolsey's original college, initially called Cardinal College, mentioned 16 choristers and 30 singing priests.

Christ Church Cathedral is one of the smallest cathedrals in the Church of England.

The nave, choir, main tower and transepts are late Norman. There are architectural features ranging from Norman to the Perpendicular style and a large rose window of the ten-part (i.e., botanical) type.

John Wesley and Charles Wesley, leaders of the Methodist revival, were ordained at Christ Church Cathedral when they were Anglicans.

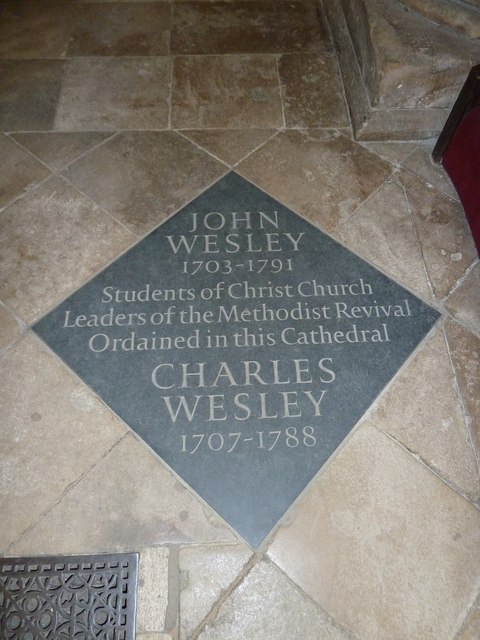
Memorial to John Wesley and Charles Wesley, leaders of the Methodist revival in Christ Church Cathedral, Oxford, where they were ordained while they were Anglicans

== Dean and chapter ==
As of October 2024:

- Dean – The Very Reverend Sarah Foot (since 1 July 2023 collation)
- Archdeacon of Oxford – The Venerable Jonathan Chaffey (since 1 May 2020 collation)
- Sub Dean – The Reverend Canon Peter Moger
- Diocesan Canon – Vacant

The University's four senior theology professors are also ex officio canons residentiary and members of the Cathedral chapter:

- Regius Professor of Divinity – The Reverend Canon Andrew Paul Davison (since 2024)
- Lady Margaret Professor of Divinity – Carol Harrison (lay; since 27 April 2015 installation)
- Regius Professor of Moral and Pastoral Theology – The Revd Canon Luke Bretherton (since 25 January 2025)
- Regius Professor of Ecclesiastical History – chair held concurrently by the dean, the Very Revd Sarah Foot

There are also other full-time clergy of the cathedral and college who are not formal members of the cathedral chapter, including the precentor and school chaplain, the Revd Philippa White; and the college chaplain, the Revd Kirsty Borthwick.

On 19 September 2023, the governing body of Christ Church voted to separate the ecclesiastical role of dean from the position of head of house of the college.

== Music ==
=== Organ ===
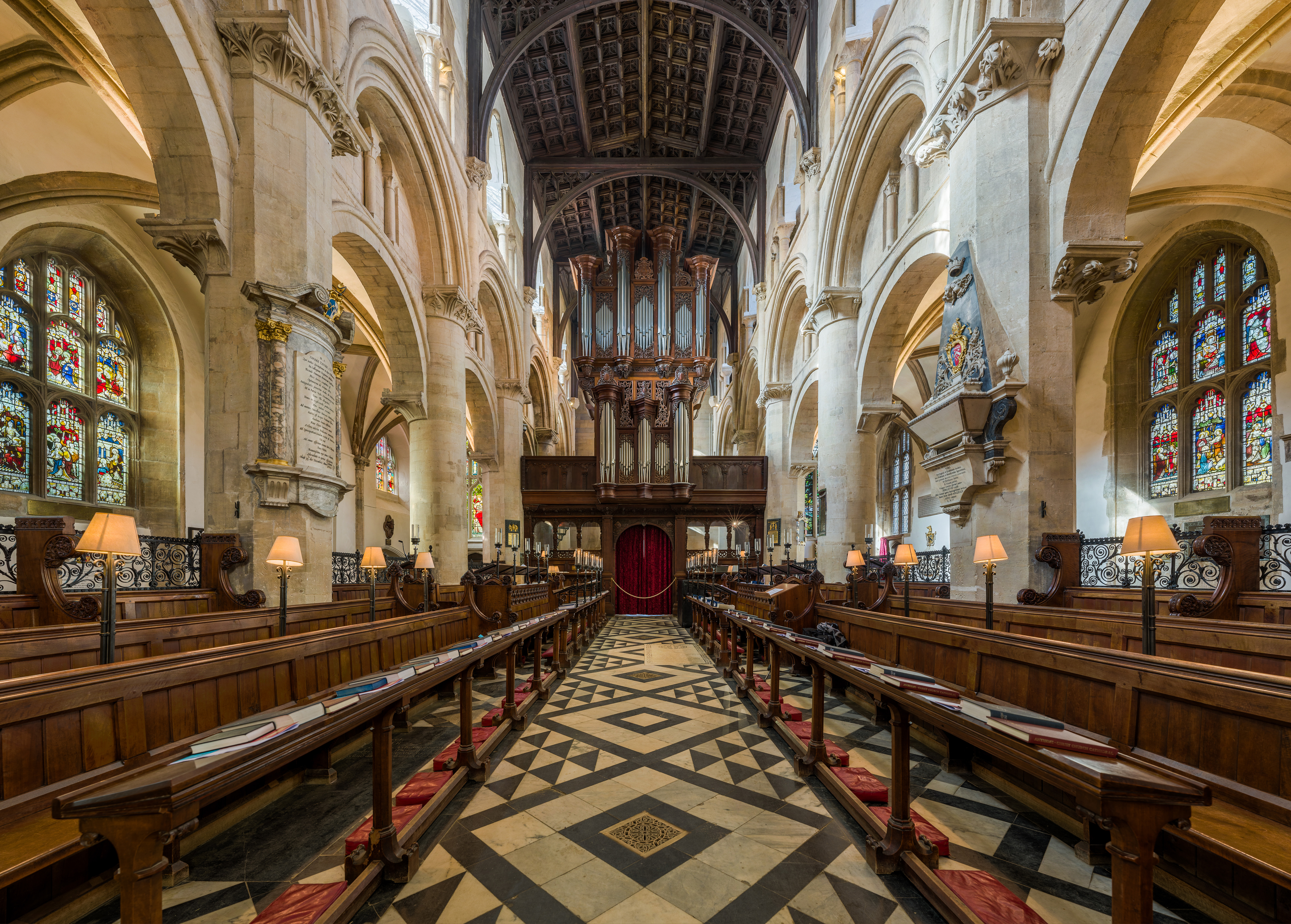
The nave, looking towards the organ and entrance

The organ is a 43-rank, four-manual and pedal instrument built in 1979 by Austrian firm Rieger Orgelbau. It is located in the west end. In April 2024 work began to install a new organ in the east end of the church; the current chancel organ, which is rented from the charity Pipe Up For Pipe Organs, was to be removed to allow floor surveys to be undertaken.

=== Organists ===
First among the notable organists of Christ Church Cathedral is the Renaissance composer John Taverner, who was appointed as the first organist by Wolsey in 1526. Other organists (and directors of the choir) have included Basil Harwood, Thomas Armstrong, W. H. Harris, Simon Preston, Francis Grier, Nicholas Cleobury, Stephen Darlington and Steven Grahl. The post of Organist is currently held by Peter Holder. (As in many English cathedrals, the organist's primary duties are as director of the choir, with most of the organ playing delegated to the sub-organist or organ scholar.)

=== Choirs ===
The main choir, the Christ Church Cathedral Choir, as of 2024 is directed by Peter Holder. It consists of twelve adults (six professional "lay-clerks" and six student "academical clerks") and sixteen choristers (boys aged 7–13 from Christ Church Cathedral School). The choir was all male until 2019, when they welcomed alto Elizabeth Nurse as their first female clerk. They sing in university term time, at Christmas and Easter, and have an extensive touring and recording programme. Former choristers include the composer William Walton.

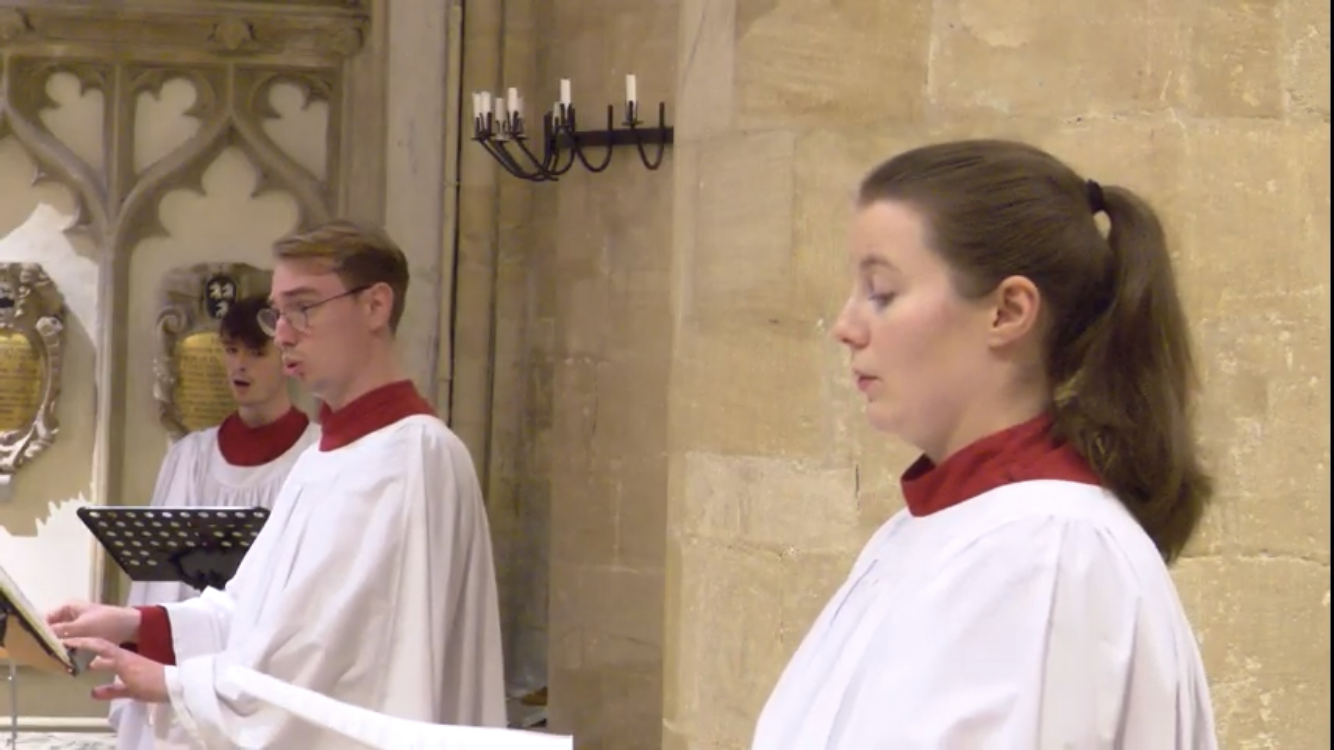
The choir

The Cathedral Singers consists of volunteers and as of 2024 is directed by Hilary Punnett. They are usually in residence outside of term time when the choristers and academical clerks of the main choir are on holiday.

The College Choir sings every 1–2 weeks in term time and is made up of current students and staff from the college.

In May 2019, Frideswide Voices, a local group created to provide opportunities for girls to sing for the liturgy in the chapels of Magdalen College, New College, and Christ Church, were re-founded as a permanently endowed part of the Cathedral's choral foundation. The choristers are aged 7–14 and are drawn from schools around Oxford. They sing Evensong once a week with the clerks of the Cathedral Choir, and perform alongside the boys of the Cathedral choir in certain concerts and services. Helen Smee was appointed director in 2019, taking over from founding director William Dawes.

=== Bells ===
The cathedral has a ring of 12 bells hung for full circle ringing. The tenor weighs 31 long cwt 0 qr 23 lb (3,495 lb or 1,585 kg), diameter 56 inches (1,400 mm) tuned to D. It was cast in 1589 and is historically important according to the Church Buildings Council. Two other bells are also historically important, numbers 10 and 9 (16 long cwt 2 qr (1,850 lb or 840 kg) in F♯ and 12 long cwt (1,300 lb or 600 kg) in G respectively) which were both cast c.1410.

As well as the bells used for ringing there are also two other bells. The litany bell of c.1410 is also historically important. It weighs 1 long cwt 2 qr (170 lb or 80 kg) and sounds the note of G. The Bourdon bell is Great Tom. This dates from 1680, weighs 124 long cwt 2 qr (13,940 lb or 6,320 kg), diameter 85 inches (2,200 mm) sounding A. Great Tom is only swung "on a very small number of occasions", but it is sounded every night.

== Stained glass ==
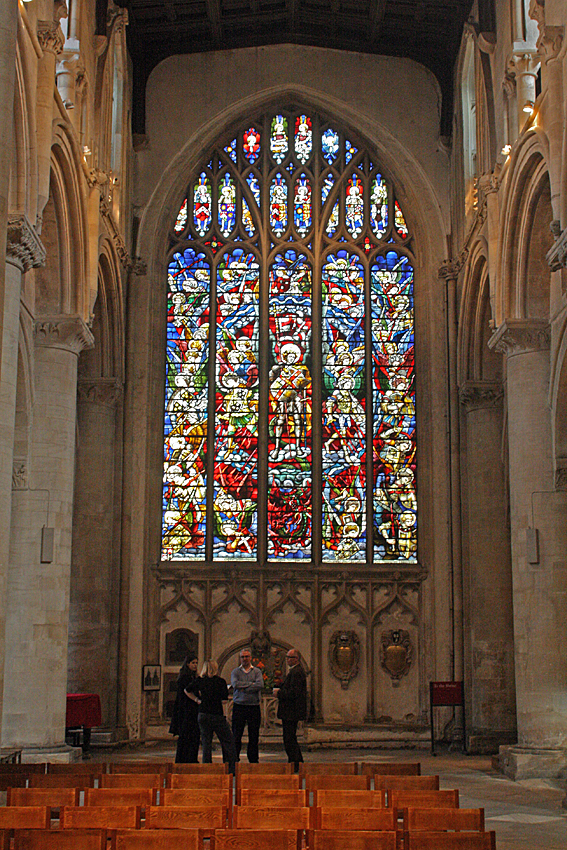
Window in north transept depicting St Michael

The Cathedral possesses a fine collection of stained glass, the oldest being the 14th-century Becket Window in the Lucy Chapel. It is one of very few images of Thomas Becket to survive the Reformation. There are two windows by the 17th-century Dutch artist Abraham van Linge, one depicting Jonah, the other dedicated to Bishop King. The firm of Clayton and Bell created the dramatic St Michael Window in the north transept in 1870, and from the same period are five windows by Morris & Co to designs by Edward Burne-Jones.

In 2023 a memorial window dedicated to E. H. Burn by John Reyntiens, depicting Francis of Assisi, was inaugurated.

In September 2025 a new stained-glass window by the artist Thomas Denny was dedicated at Christ Church, which depicts the Parable of the Prodigal Son. Denny designed his new stained glass to complement the 17th-century window by Dutch artist Abraham van Linge that fills the opening immediately adjacent.

== Notable burials ==
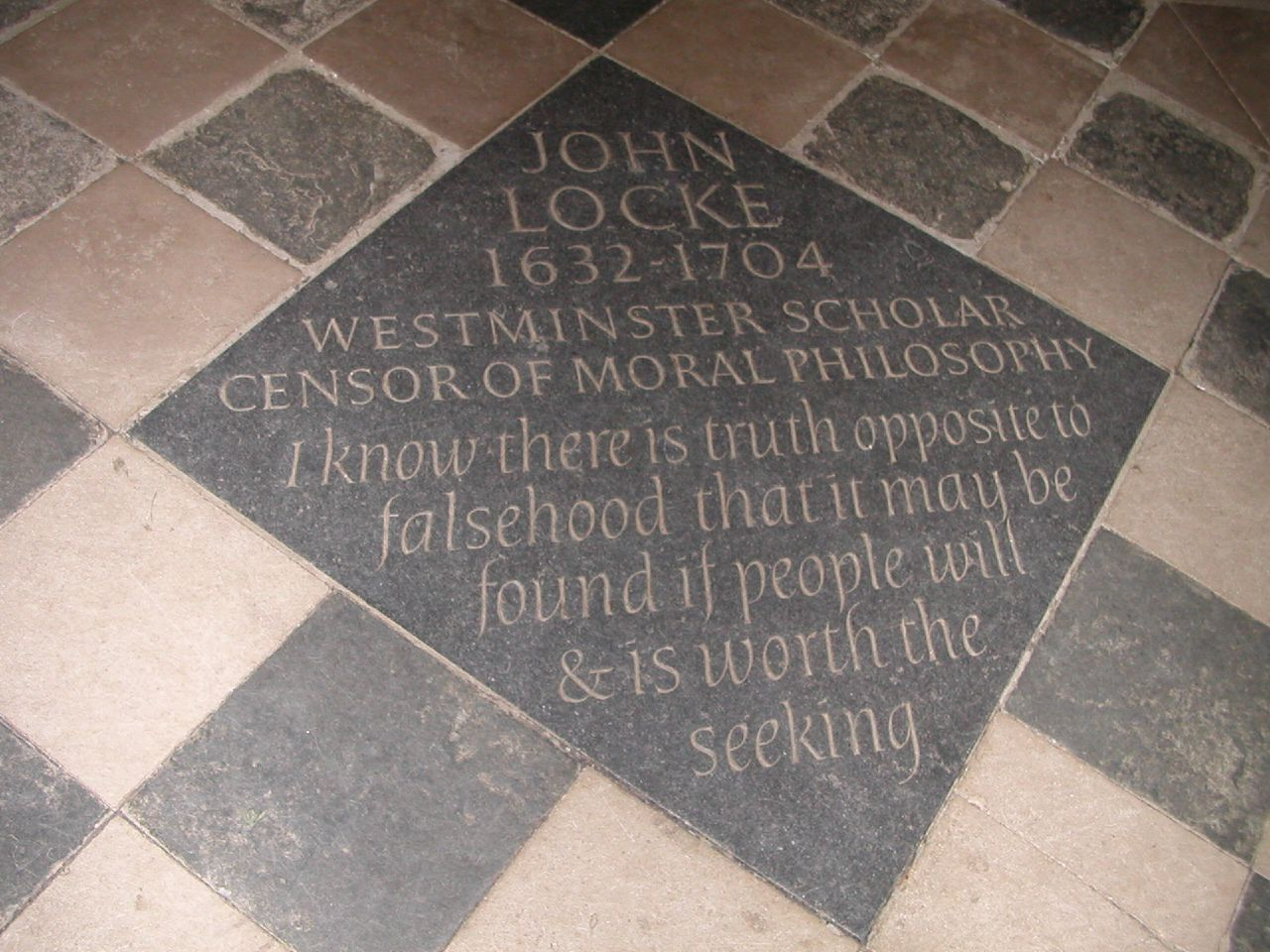
John Locke memorial engraving

- John Bankes (1589–1644), English lawyer and politician
- George Berkeley, philosopher and Bishop of Cloyne (memorial in the nave)
- Robert Burton, author of The Anatomy of Melancholy
- Thomas Byron, Royalist officer in the First English Civil War
- John Fell, Bishop of Oxford
- Henry Gage (1593–1645) (buried in the Lucy Chapel, off the south transept)
- Richard Gardiner (1591–1670)
- Henry Liddell, father of Alice Liddell
- John Locke, buried at High Laver in Essex, has an engraved floor plaque to his memory in the church.
- Elizabeth Montacute (d. August 1354)
- Edward Bouverie Pusey
- George Stewart, 9th Seigneur d'Aubigny, cavalier
- Thomas Strong, Bishop of Oxford
- John Underhill (c.1545–1592), Bishop of Oxford
- John Urry (1666–1715), literary editor
- Peter Wyche (c. 1593–1643), ambassador to the Ottoman Empire and member of the Privy Council

== Gallery ==
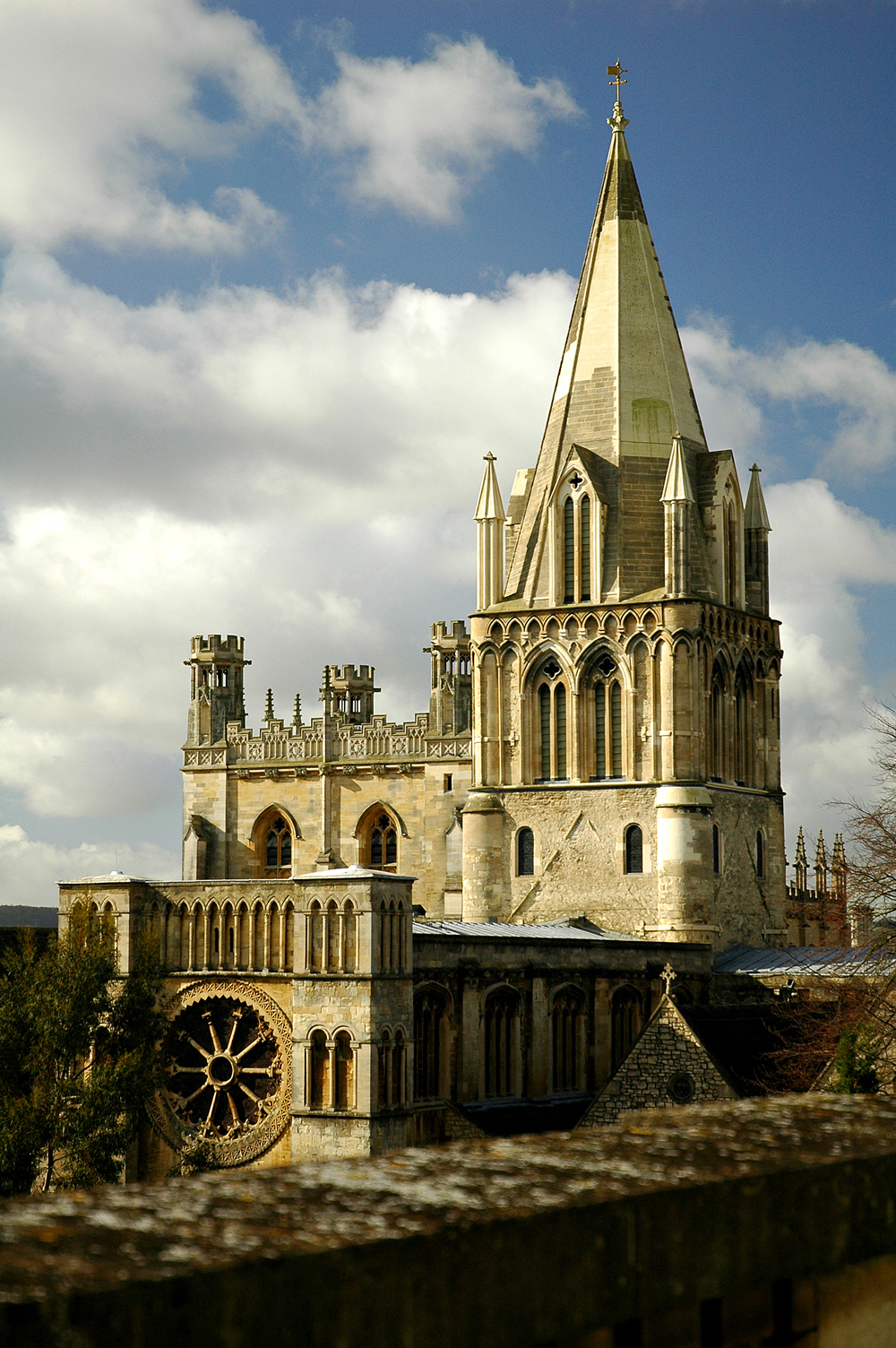
View of the cathedral

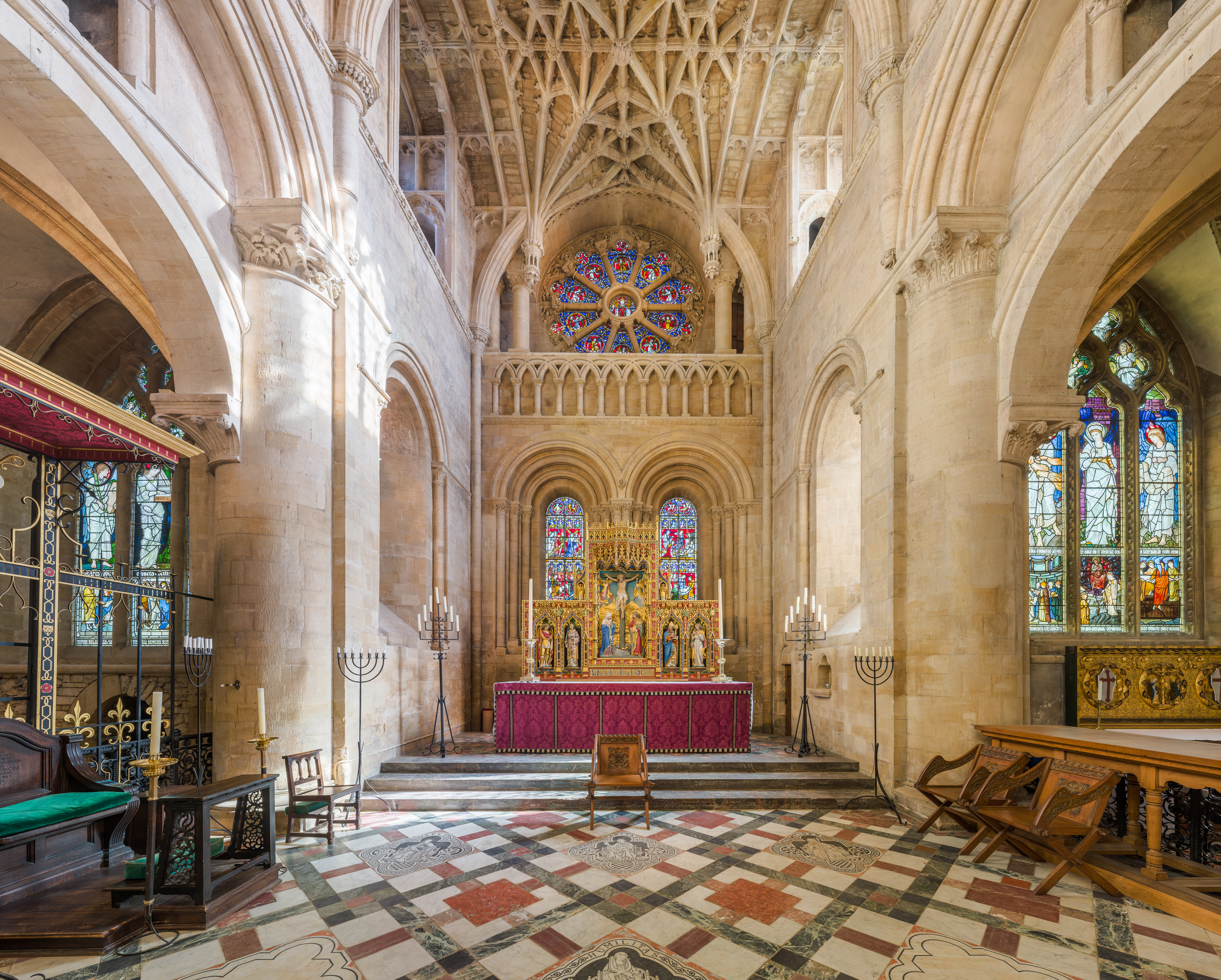
Altar and vault

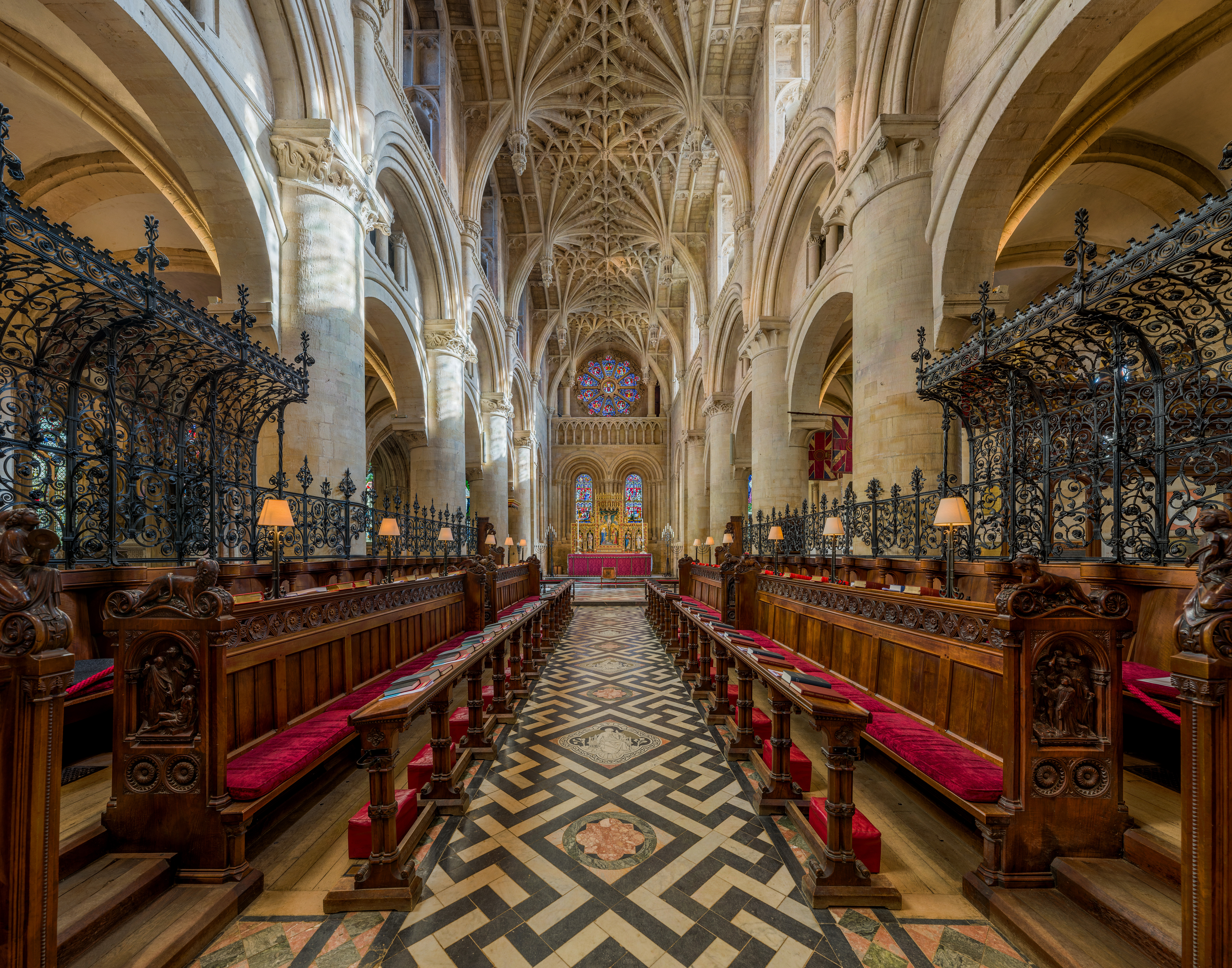
The chancel, looking towards the altar

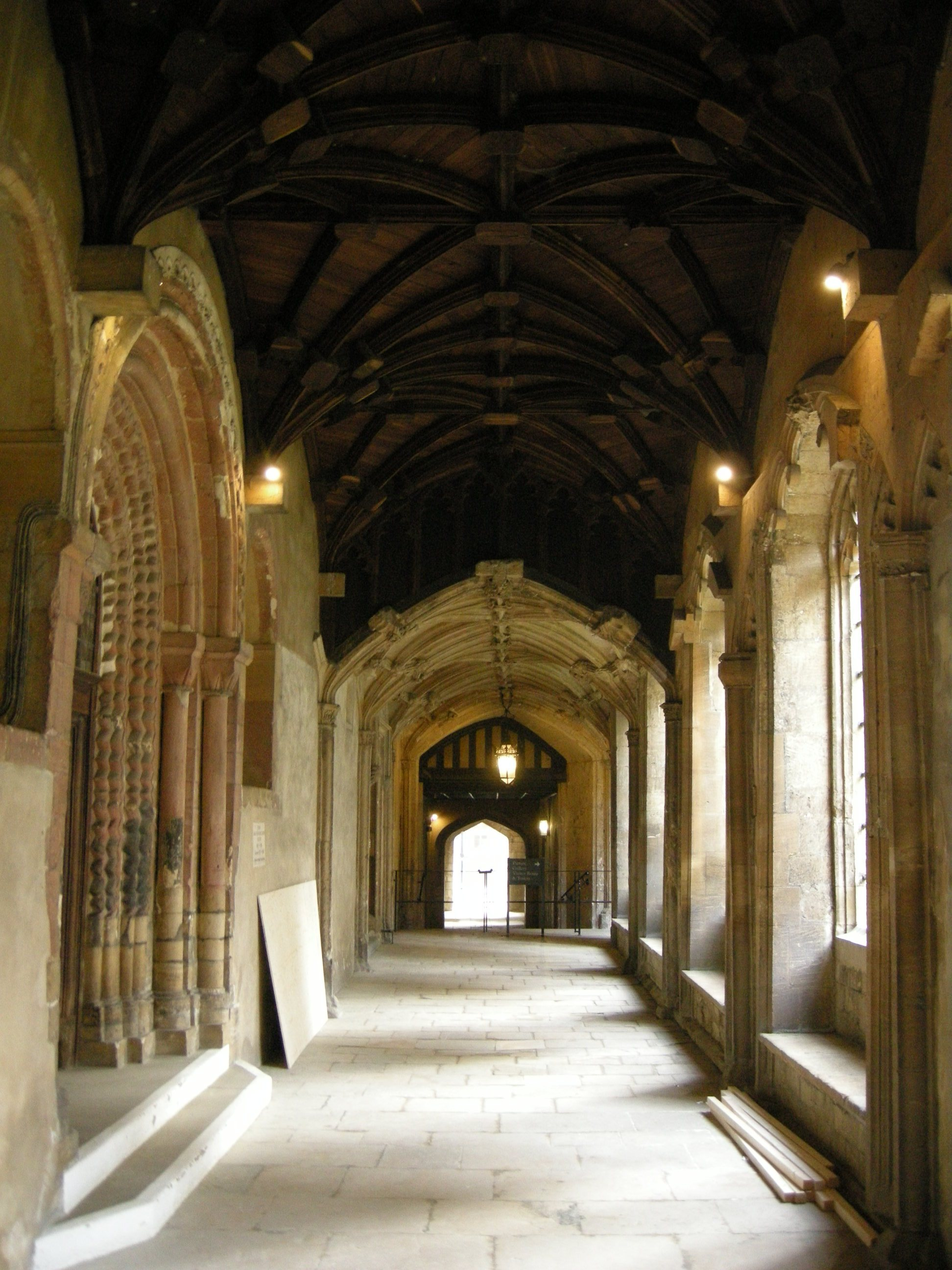
Cloisters

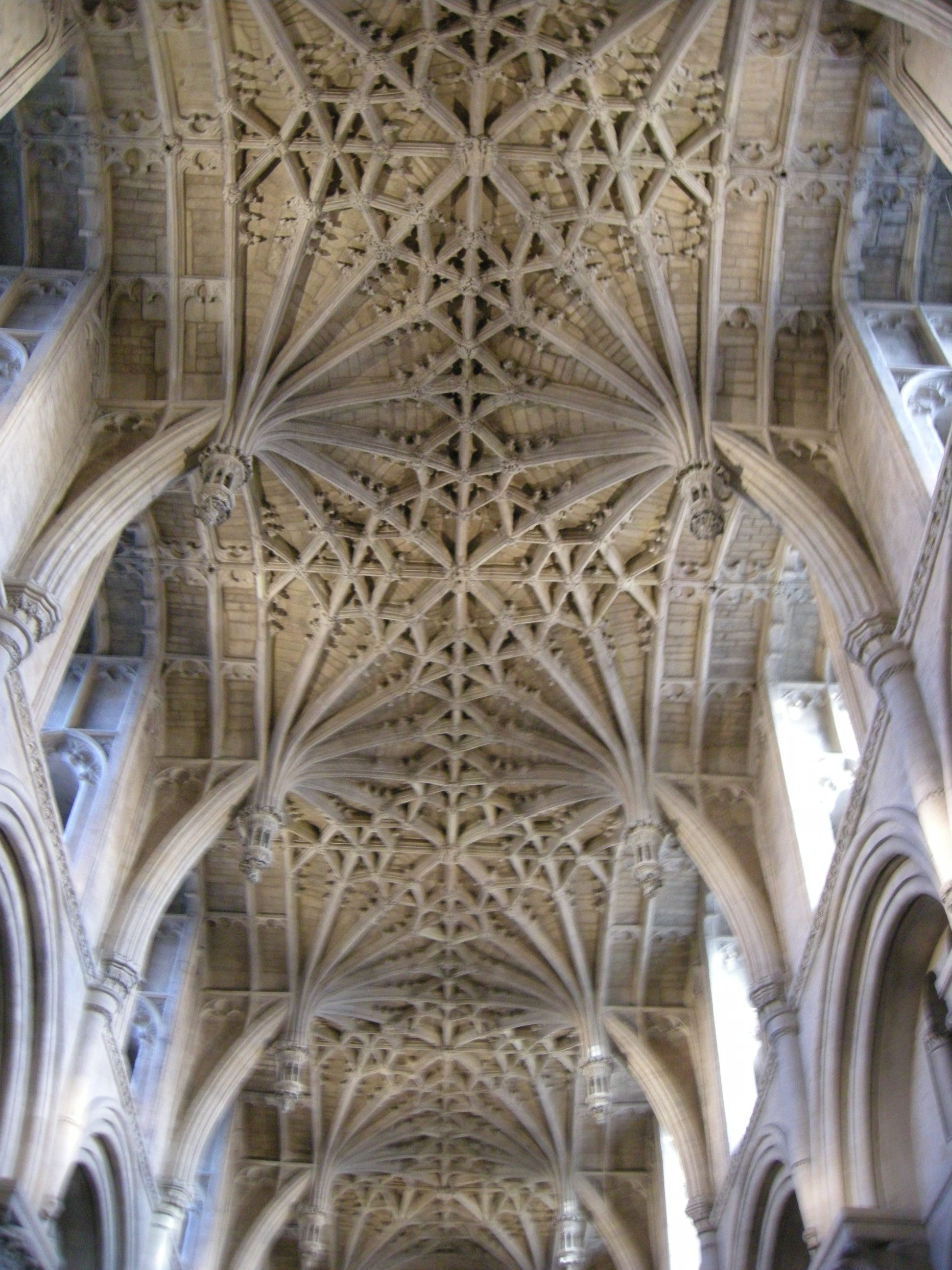
The chancel's pendant lierne vault

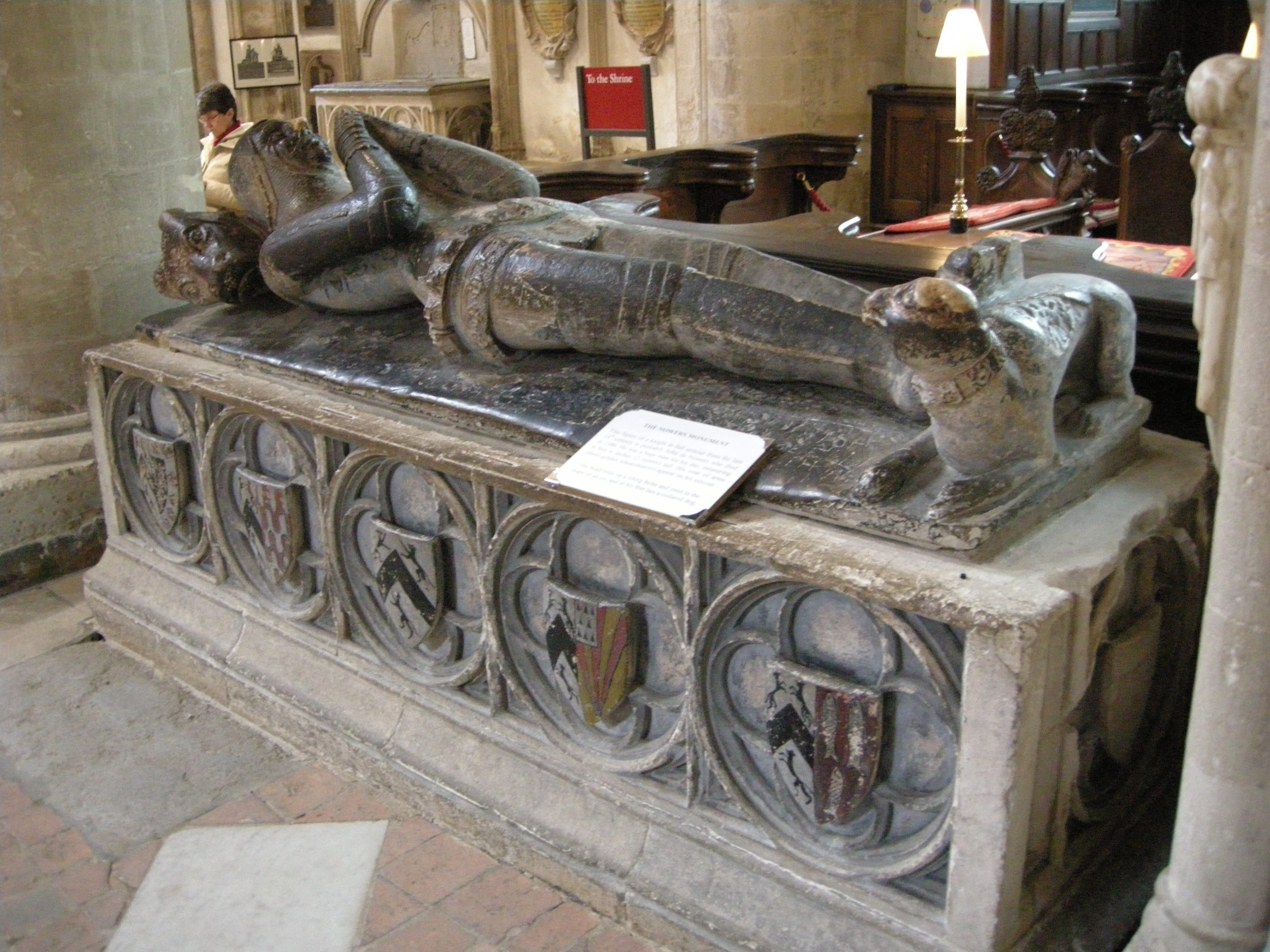
Tomb of John de Nowers

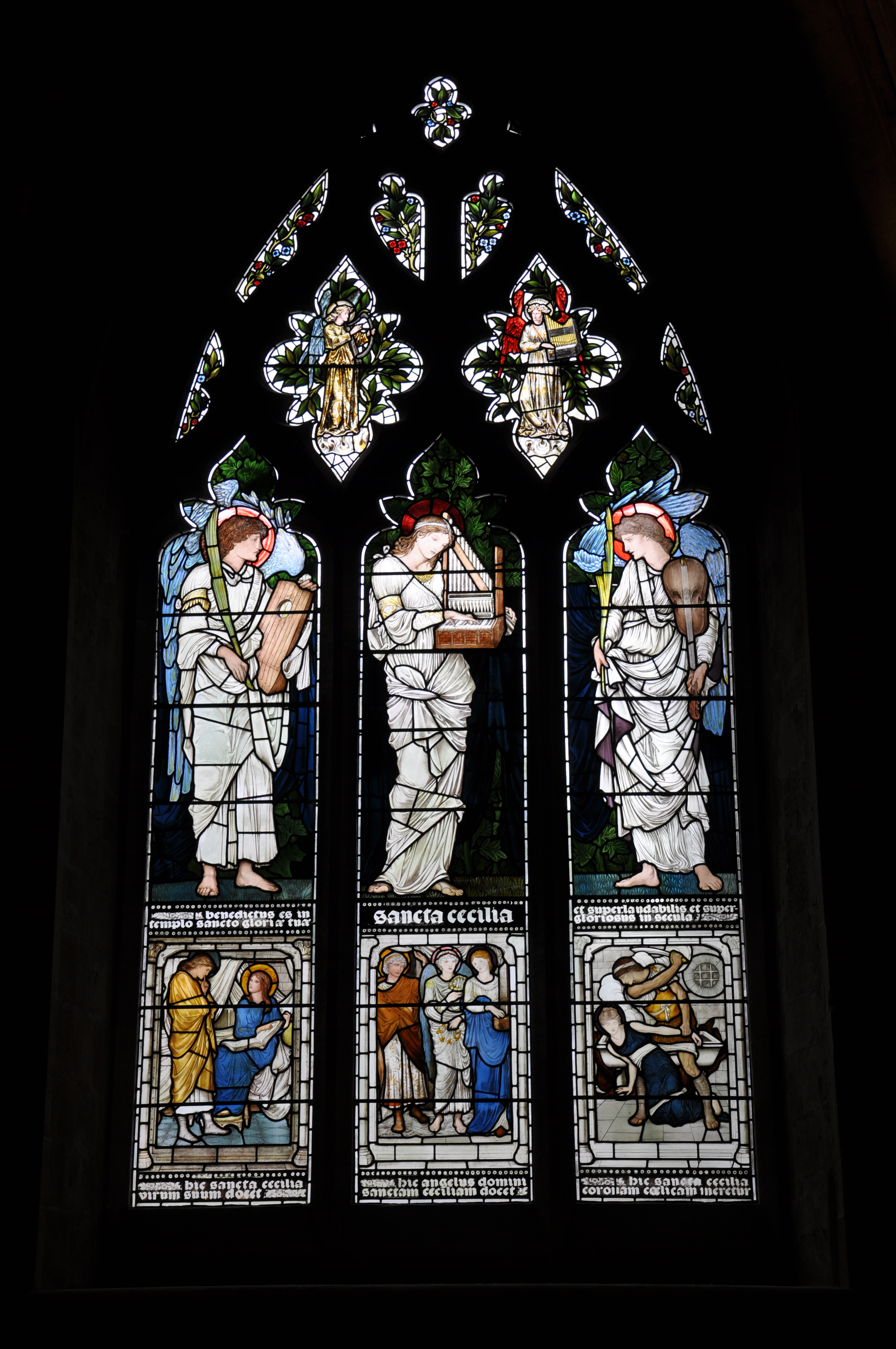
St Cecilia window by E Burne-Jones

== See also ==
- List of cathedrals in the United Kingdom
- Christ Church, Oxford: more information on the college and the cathedral
- Christ Church Cathedral School
- The Clerks of Christ Church
- Bishop of Oxford
- Diocese of Oxford
- Architecture of the medieval cathedrals of England
- List of Gothic Cathedrals in Europe
- English Gothic architecture
- English Gothic stained glass windows
- Romanesque architecture
- Christ Church Cathedral, Christchurch in New Zealand inspired by the Oxford cathedral
