= Regius Professor of Moral and Pastoral Theology =

Faculty chair at the University of Oxford, England

The Regius Professorship of Moral and Pastoral Theology, together with the Regius Professorship of Ecclesiastical History, was founded at the University of Oxford by an act of Parliament in 1840, and first filled in 1842. The act attached the chair to the fourth canonry at Christ Church from the next vacancy, which occurred in 1849: as such, the holder must be an Anglican priest or a priest of a church in communion with the Church of England. The initial title, Regius Professor of Pastoral Theology, was expanded for the appointment of K. E. Kirk in 1933. The professor is a member of the Chapter of Christ Church.

== List of Regius Professors ==
- 1842–1873: Charles Atmore Ogilvie
- 1873–1885: Edward King
- 1885–1892: Francis Paget
- 1892–1903: Robert Campbell Moberly
- 1903–1933: Robert Lawrence Ottley
- 1933–1938: Kenneth Kirk
- 1938–1944: Leonard Hodgson
- 1945–1948: Robert Mortimer
- 1949–1971: V. A. Demant
- 1972–1980: Peter Baelz
- 1982–2006: Oliver O'Donovan
- 2007–2022: Nigel Biggar
- 2025–present: Luke Bretherton
