= Abraham and Bernard van Linge =

Window painter from Emden (1623–1642)

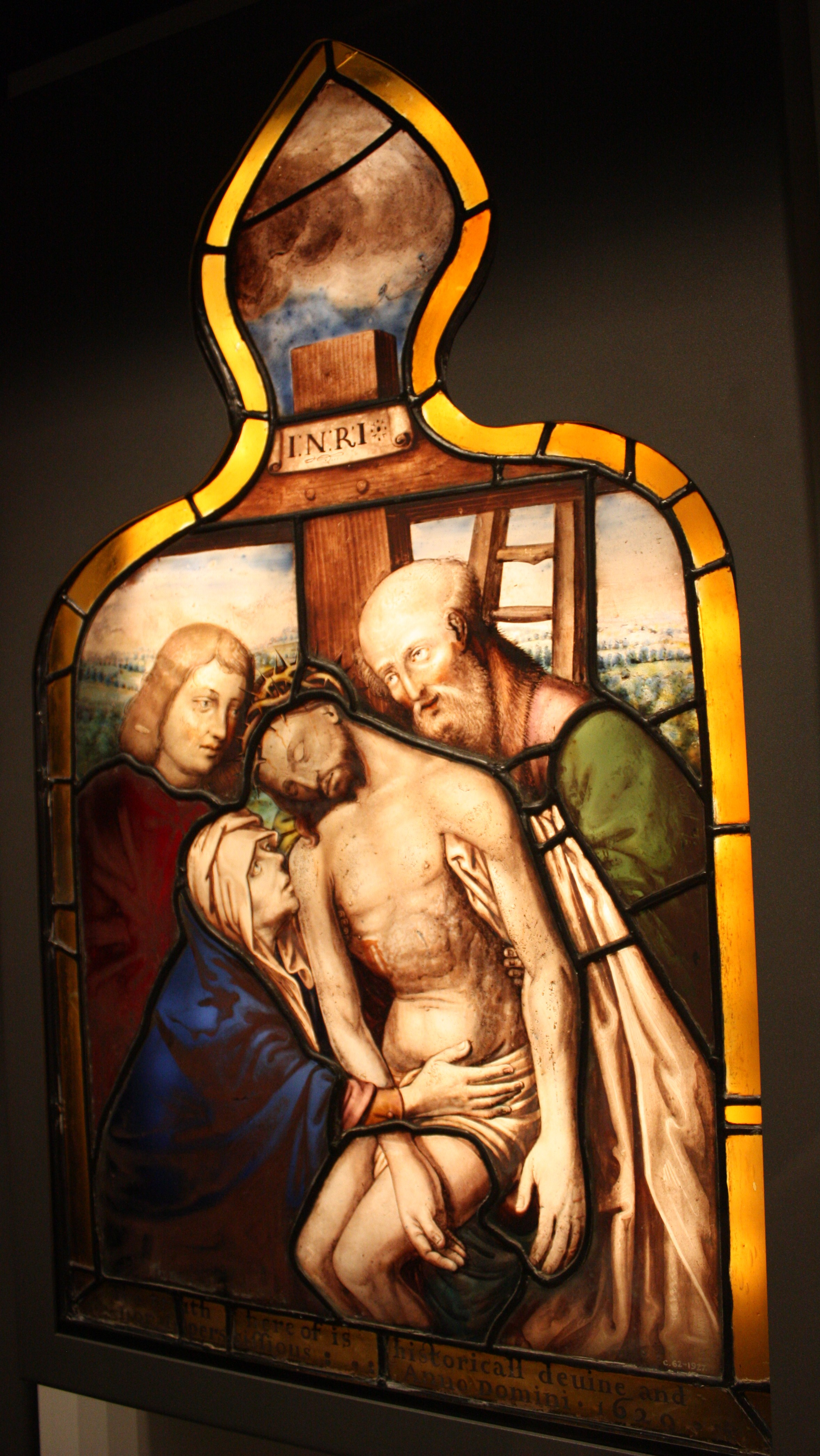
The Deposition from the Cross (1629) by Abraham van Linge in 1629 after a composition by Rogier van der Weyden. Originally at Hampton Court, Herefordshire, but now in the Victoria and Albert Museum

Abraham van Linge (fl. 1625–41) and his eldest brother Bernard van Linge (1598 – c. 1644) were window painters from Emden, East Frisia, where their father and grandfather were glaziers. They completed the bulk of their work in England between the 1620s and the 1640s. They painted at a time when stained glass was losing popularity in favour of their method, the usage of vitreous enamels on glass as a blank canvas and then fired. Lead lining is used to hold together pieces of glass. The duration and intensity of the firing determined the final colour along with the colour and type of enamel.

Bernard van Linge worked in Paris from 1617 to 1621. When religious conflicts broke out in France, he fled to London around 1621, where he quickly found employment in a glazier's studio through connections in the Dutch expatriate community. Abraham joined him around 1623.

Abraham van Linge must have been born in 1604–5, as he was aged 29 when he was matriculated at the University of Oxford as a privileged person on 4 July 1634, with his profession given as "Artis Peritus" (art expert). His work can be seen in the chapels of University College, Oxford, The Queen's College, Oxford, Wadham College, Oxford, Lincoln College, Oxford, and at Christ Church, Oxford, in England, where the lead lining is particularly noticeable. His work is supposedly in the Duke Humfrey reading room of the Bodleian Library, also in Oxford, though it is uncertain whether the painted glass frames are by him or executed in his style.
