= Luke Bretherton =

British philosopher and theologian

Academic background
- Education: Gonville and Caius College, Cambridge; King's College, London

Academic work
- Discipline: Theology
- Sub-discipline: Missiology; moral theology; political theology
- School or tradition: Anglicanism; charismatic movement
- Institutions: King's College, London; Duke University
- Main interests: Community organizing; democracy; consociationalism/confederalism; church–state relations; capitalism; debt; interfaith relations

Luke Bretherton is a British author and theologian. His work addresses contemporary moral and political questions, particularly as these relate to the relationship between religion and democracy. He is Regius Professor of Moral and Pastoral Theology and director of the McDonald Centre for Theology, Ethics, and Public Life at Oxford University and a canon of Christ Church Cathedral. Prior to that he was Robert E. Cushman Distinguished Professor of Moral and Political Theology at Duke University in North Carolina (2012–present). Previously he taught at King's College London (2004–2012) and St Augustine's College (2001–2004). Alongside his scholarly work, he writes in the media (including The Guardian, The Times and The Washington Post) on topics related to religion and politics, has worked with a variety of faith-based NGOs and churches around the world, and is actively involved in forms of grassroots democratic politics, both in the UK and the US. He hosts and writes the Listen, Organize, Act! podcast.

He is best known for his work on how and why religion broadly, and churches in particular, can enable or disable democratic politics. Constructively, his work draws on the intellectual history of covenantal political theologies (as against political philosophies that focus on a social contract) and forms of democratic practice such as broad-based community organizing to set out a contemporary vision for democracy. His understanding of democracy provides a framework for addressing the contested relationship between religion and politics in hyper-diverse, plural societies. The technical term for it is a 'consociational' conception of democracy and it represents an alternative to multiculturalism, communitarianism, and what the philosopher Charles Taylor identifies as a "politics of recognition. Another significant contribution he makes is pioneering the use of ethnographic and interdisciplinary methodologies in political theology.

His approach to theology is dialogical. Truths about God and about what it means to be human can only be discovered through encounter and relationship with others – Christian and non-Christian as well as human and nonhuman. Rather than either a set of abstract dogmas, empirical facts, mathematical formulations, or philosophical axioms, truth on his account is a relational and participatory reality. For Bretherton, coming to know the truth about God and neighbour necessarily entails listening to others, cultivating the quality and character of relations with others that enable both oneself and the other to be heard, and forming a common life with others through democratic politics.

Specific issues addressed in his work include debt, usury, fair trade, environmental justice, racism, humanitarianism, the treatment of refugees, interfaith relations, euthanasia, secularism, nationalism, church-state relations, and the provision of social welfare.

== Early and family life ==
Bretherton grew up on west London in the Notting Hill–Ladbroke Grove neighbourhood. His parents were very involved in church-based community initiatives. This included helping to found and then run Latimer Housing Association (since incorporated into Octavia Hill Housing Association) which was a response to the treatment of migrants from the Caribbean by slum landlords in Notting Hill in the 1960s. Bretherton references this as a formative influence on his understanding of the role of churches in society. Between leaving school and going to university he served in the army, doing a short service limited commission in the 7th Parachute Regiment, Royal Horse Artillery (1987–88). After leaving university he worked as a researcher in Parliament for Peter Archer, a Labour Party MP and former solicitor general. He then worked for a Christian charity from 1992 to 1997 focused on helping churches involved in rebuilding civil society in former Communist countries after the fall of the Berlin Wall in 1989. During this time, he was part of a Christian collective of DJs, artists, and activists called Abundant which ran nightclubs, art events, and "alternative worship" services in London. He is married to the food writer Caroline Bretherton.

== Education ==
Bretherton studied history at Gonville and Caius College, Cambridge, graduating in 1991. He focused on the history of political thought and was influenced by the Cambridge School of intellectual history. After working with churches and faith-based groups in Central and Eastern Europe for a number of years he began doctoral work at King's College London completing his doctorate in moral philosophy and theology, graduating in 2002. During his doctoral studies he worked with the former Bishop of London, Rt Rev & Rt Hon Richard Chartres to help set up the St Ethelburga's Centre for Reconciliation & Peace. He also trained and volunteered as a local community and neighbourhood mediator.

== Community organizing and Blue Labour ==
Bretherton was a leader for more than eight years in the community organizing coalition, London Citizens. London Citizens is part of Citizens UK and affiliated with the Industrial Areas Foundation in the United States. He was involved in leading a number of campaigns and helped organize the 2010 Election Assembly in the leadup to the general election – this was the first and only time the leaders of the three largest parties were directly questioned and called to account in a public assembly by representatives of civil society as part of an election. On the basis of his academic work and involvement in community organizing he served for two years on the advisory panel of the Community First and Community Organising Programme of the Office for Civil Society and Cabinet Office of the UK government.

Through shared involvement in St Ethelburga's Centre for Reconciliation and Peace and community organizing Bretherton formed a close working relationship with the Jewish political theorist Maurice Glasman. They undertook a joint, ethnographically based research project on religious involvement in community organizing. It was from this project that the initial thinking and work that led to Blue Labour was developed. From 2009 onwards, Bretherton worked with Glasman in the early stages of this movement to help initiate it as a force within the Labour Party. Blue Labour called for a politics of the common good that sought to represent the needs and concerns of working-class people, combining culturally conservative values with labour rights and left-wing economic policies, and criticising the prevailing technocratic and progressive approach prevalent in both political parties.

He continued his involvement in community organizing when he moved to the States in 2012, focusing particularly on popular education. As part of this he writes and hosts the Organize, Act! podcast which focuses on the historical and contemporary relationship between religion and radical democratic politics, with a particular focus on community organizing and community development.

== Writing ==
A central focus of Bretherton’s work is the nature of democratic politics and how democracy enshrines core Christian commitments. Bretherton writes that humans cannot survive, let alone thrive without others, noting that some kind of common life must be developed if human life is to go on. He identifies politics as the name for generating this common life. He writes: "Politics is the name for generating this common life and the stark alternative to three other options. When I meet someone I disagree with, dislike, find strange or threatening, I can do one of four things. I can kill them. I can create a structure of domination so I can control them. I can make life so difficult that they run away. Or I can do politics. That is to say, I can form, norm, and sustain some kind of common life––amid asymmetries of power, competing visions of the good, and my own feelings of fear or aversion––without killing, dominating, or causing them to flee. These really are the only options. Human history and the contemporary context are awash with examples of the first three approaches." For Bretherton, democratic politics names a particular, nonviolent way of doing politics and thereby building a common life with others over time in a specific place. On his view, theologically understood, democracy is a way of living out in practice the divine command to love neighbours.

His latest book is A Primer in Christian Ethics: Christ and the Struggle to Life Well (Cambridge University Press, 2023). Connecting the theory and practice of Christian moral thought to contemporary existential concerns, the book integrates classic approaches to the pursuit of moral and political wisdom with contemporary liberationist and critical voices. The relationship between human and nonhuman life provides a central focus to the work, which foregrounds questions of environmental justice. As well as addressing a broad range of ethical questions, the book situates moral formation and the pursuit of human and nonhuman flourishing alongside a concern for spirituality, pastoral care, and political struggles to survive and thrive in the contemporary context.

His previous books include Christ and the Common Life: Political Theology and the Case for Democracy (Eerdmans, 2019) which provides an introduction to the history of and contemporary reflection on the relationship between Christianity and politics. Through addressing questions about poverty and injustice, the formation of a common life with strangers, and the handling of power, it develops an innovative political theology of democracy. His book Resurrecting Democracy (Cambridge University Press, 2015) grew out of a four-year ethnographic study of a multi-faith, broad-based community organizing initiative and assesses the interaction between Christianity, radical democracy, globalization, secularity, responses to poverty, and patterns of interfaith relations. Christianity & Contemporary Politics (Wiley-Blackwell, 2010) won the 2013 Michael Ramsey Prize for Theological Writing. It analyzes the church's involvement in social welfare provision, community organizing, the treatment of refugees, and fair trade in order to develop an inductive account of what faithful forms of social and political engagement entail. His first book, Hospitality as Holiness (Routledge, 2006) explores the theological responses to moral pluralism in critical dialogue with Alasdair MacIntyre's moral philosophy. It develops a constructive response to the issues identified through the motif of "hospitality". The book uses euthanasia and the hospice movement as a case study through which to examine the implications of this response.

== Honours, grants, and lectureships ==
- 2020–23 Selection Committee, Holberg Prize
- 2017–18 Henry Luce III Fellow in Theology
- 2014 Margaret L. Sorensen Lecture, Yale Divinity School
- 2013 Michael Ramsey Prize for Theological Writing]
- 2013 Thomas Langford Lectureship Award, Duke University

== Books ==
- Hospitality as Holiness: Christian Witness Amid Moral Diversity (Routledge, 2006) ISBN 9781409403494
- Christianity and Contemporary Politics: The Conditions and Possibilities of Faithful Witness (Oxford: Wiley-Blackwell, 2010) ISBN 9781405199698 Winner of the 2013 Michael Ramsey Prize for Theological Writing.
- (editor) Living Out Loud: Conversations about Virtue, Ethics and Evangelicalism (Paternoster, 2010) ISBN 9781842277201
- (editor) Remembering Our Future: Explorations in Deep Church (Wipf and Stock, 2013) ISBN 9781620328354
- Resurrecting Democracy: Faith, Citizenship and the Politics of a Common Life (Cambridge: Cambridge University Press, 2015) ISBN 9781107641969
- Christ and the Common Life: Political Theology and the Case for Democracy (Grand Rapids, MI: Eerdmans, 2019) ISBN 9780802881793
- A Primer in Christian Ethics: Christ and the Struggle to Live Well (Cambridge: Cambridge University Press, 2023) ISBN 9781009329026
- (editor) What Is Political Theology? (Columbia University Press, 2025) ISBN 9780231222143
